= 2023 UCI Africa Tour =

- Nineteenth edition of the UCI Africa Tour

Details
- Dates: 3 November 2022 – 9 October 2023
- Location: Africa
- Races: 14

The 2023 UCI Africa Tour was the 19th season of the UCI Africa Tour. The season began on 3 November 2022 with the Les Challenges de la Marche Verte and ended in October 2023.

The points leader, based on the cumulative results of previous races, wore the UCI Africa Tour cycling jersey.

Throughout the season, points were awarded to the top finishers of stages within stage races and the final general classification standings of each of the stages races and one-day events. The quality and complexity of a race also determined how many points were awarded to the top finishers: the higher the UCI rating of a race, the more points were awarded. The UCI ratings from highest to lowest were as follows:

- Multi-day events: 2.1 and 2.2
- One-day events: 1.1 and 1.2

== Events ==
Races in the 2023 UCI Africa Tour
Race	Rating	Date	Winner	Team	Ref
(Morocco) Grand Prix Sakia El Hamra	1.2	3 November 2022	Ahmed Al Mansoori (UAE)	United Arab Emirates (national team)	
(Morocco) Grand Prix Oued Eddahab	1.2	5 November 2022	Heiko Homrighausen (GER)	Team Embrace The World	
(Morocco) Grand Prix Al Massira	1.2	6 November 2022	Jules de Cock (NED)	Global Cycling Team	
(Morocco) Le Trophée Princier	1.2	8 November 2022	Achraf Ed-Doghmy (MAR)	Morocco	
(Morocco) Le Trophée de l'Anniversaire	1.2	10 November 2022	Nasser Eddine Maatougui (MAR)	Sidi Ali–Unlock Sports Team	
(Morocco) Le Trophée de la Maison Royale	1.2	11 November 2022	Adil El Arbaoui (MAR)	Morocco	
(Burkina Faso) Tour du Faso	2.2	11–20 November 2022	The 2022 Tour du Faso was canceled due to the security context in Burkina Faso.		
(Gabon) La Tropicale Amissa Bongo	2.1	23–29 January 2023	Geoffrey Soupe (FRA)	Team TotalEnergies	
(Mauritania) Tour du Sahel	2.2	1–5 February 2023	Adil El Arbaoui (MAR)	Morocco	
Tour du Rwanda	2.1	19–26 February 2023	Henok Mulubrhan (ERI)	Green Project–Bardiani–CSF–Faizanè	
(Algeria) Tour d'Algérie International de Cyclisme	2.2	7–16 March 2023	Paul Hennequin (FRA)	Nice Métropole Côte d'Azur	
(Algeria) Grand Prix International de la ville d'Alger	1.2	17 March 2023	Youcef Reguigui (ALG)	Terengganu Cycling Team	
(Benin) Tour du Bénin	2.2	2–7 May 2023	Achraf Ed-Doghmy (MAR)	Morocco	
(Morocco) Grand Prix du Prince Héritier Moulay el Hassan	1.2	26 May 2023	Lukáš Kubiš (SVK)	Dukla Banská Bystrica	
(Morocco) Grand Prix du Trône	1.2	27 May 2023	Lukáš Kubiš (SVK)	Dukla Banská Bystrica	
(Morocco) Grand Prix de la Famille Royale	1.2	28 May 2023	Youcef Reguigui (ALG)	Terengganu Cycling Team	
(Cameroon) Tour du Cameroun	2.2	3–11 June 2023	Mohcine El Kouraji (MAR)	Morocco	
(Mauritius) Škoda Tour de Maurice	2.2	6–9 June 2023	Archie Cross (GBR)	Velo Schils Interbike Racing Team	
(Mauritius) Cours Marmouth Classique de l'île de Maurice	1.2	11 June 2023	Youcef Reguigui (ALG)	Terengganu Cycling Team	
(Morocco) Grand Prix Boukraa	1.2	8 September 2023	Sergey Rostovtsev	Istanbul Büyükșehir Belediye Spor Türkiye	
(Morocco) Grand Prix Es-Semara	1.2	9 September 2023	Adil El Arbaoui (MAR)	Morocco	
(Morocco) Grand Prix El Marsa	1.2	10 September 2023	Sergey Rostovtsev	Istanbul Büyükșehir Belediye Spor Türkiye	
(Cameroon) Grand Prix Chantal Biya	2.2	3–7 October 2023	Yacine Hamza (ALG)	Dubai Police Cycling Team	
