= 2011–12 UCI Africa Tour =

- Eighth edition of the UCI Africa Tour

Details
- Dates: 29 September 2011–11 June 2012
- Location: Africa
- Races: 27

Champions
- Individual champion: Tarik Chaoufi (MAR)
- Teams' champion: MTN–Qhubeka
- Nations' champion: Morocco

The 2011–12 UCI Africa Tour was the eighth season of the UCI Africa Tour. The season began on 29 September 2011 with the Grand Prix Chantal Biya and ended on 11 June 2012 with the Kwita Izina Cycling Tour.

The points leader, based on the cumulative results of previous races, wears the UCI Africa Tour cycling jersey. Adil Jelloul of Morocco was the defending champion of the 2010–11 UCI Africa Tour. Tarik Chaoufi of Morocco was crowned as the 2011–12 UCI Africa Tour champion.

Throughout the season, points are awarded to the top finishers of stages within stage races and the final general classification standings of each of the stages races and one-day events. The quality and complexity of a race also determines how many points are awarded to the top finishers, the higher the UCI rating of a race, the more points are awarded. The UCI ratings from highest to lowest are as follows:

- Multi-day events: 2.HC, 2.1 and 2.2
- One-day events: 1.HC, 1.1 and 1.2

== Events ==
=== 2011 ===
Date	Race Name	Location	UCI Rating	Winner	Team
29 September–2 October	Grand Prix Chantal Biya	Cameroon	2.2	Yves Ngué Ngock (CMR)	SNH Vélo Club
21–30 October	Tour du Faso	Burkina Faso	2.2	Hamidou Zidweiba (BUR)	Burkina Faso (national team)
9 November	African Continental Championships – Team Time Trial	Eritrea	CC	Daniel Teklehaymanot (ERI); Freqalsi Debesay (ERI); Natnael Berhane (ERI); Jani Tewelde (ERI)	Eritrea (national team)
11 November	African Continental Championships – Time Trial	Eritrea	CC	Daniel Teklehaymanot (ERI)	Eritrea (national team)
13 November	African Continental Championships – Road Race	Eritrea	CC	Natnael Berhane (ERI)	Eritrea (national team)
20–27 November	Tour of Rwanda	Rwanda	2.2	Kiel Reijnen (USA)	Team Type 1–Sanofi

=== 2012 ===
Date	Race Name	Location	UCI Rating	Winner	Team
16 February	GP Sakia El Hamra	Morocco	1.2	Tarik Chaoufi (MAR)	Morocco (national team)
17 February	GP Oued Eddahab	Morocco	1.2	Andris Smirnovs (LAT)	Rietumu-Delfin
18 February	GP Al Massira	Morocco	1.2	Ismail Ayoune (MAR)	Morocco (national team)
8–17 March	Tour du Cameroun	Cameroon	2.2	Yves Ngué Ngock (CMR)	Cameroon (national team)
10–14 March	Tour d'Algérie	Algeria	2.2	Natnael Berhane (ERI)	Eritrea (national team)
16 March	Circuit d'Alger	Algeria	1.2	Ioannis Tamouridis (GRE)	SP Tableware
23 March–1 April	Tour du Maroc	Morocco	2.2	Reinardt Janse van Rensburg (RSA)	MTN–Qhubeka
3 April	Challenge Khouribga	Morocco	1.2	Tarik Chaoufi (MAR)	Morocco (national team)
4 April	Challenge Youssoufia	Morocco	1.2	Mouhssine Lahsaini (MAR)	Morocco (national team)
5 April	Challenge Ben Guerir	Morocco	1.2	Abdellah Ben Youcef (ALG)	Groupement Sportif Petrolier Algérie
24–29 April	La Tropicale Amissa Bongo	Gabon	2.1	Anthony Charteau (FRA)	Team Europcar
7 May	Trophée Princier	Morocco	1.2	Tarik Chaoufi (MAR)	Morocco (national team)
8 May	Trophée de l'Anniversaire	Morocco	1.2	Reda Aadel (MAR)	Morocco (national team)
9 May	Trophée de la Maison Royale	Morocco	1.2	Abdelatif Saadoune (MAR)	Morocco (national team)
30 May–3 June	Tour of Eritrea	Eritrea	2.2	Jacques Janse van Rensburg (RSA)	MTN–Qhubeka
10–11 June	Kwita Izina Cycling Tour	Rwanda	2.2	Abraham Ruhumuriza (RWA)	Rwanda (national team)

== Final standings ==
=== Individual classification ===
Rank	Name	Points
1.	Tarik Chaoufi (MAR)	325
2.	Adil Jelloul (MAR)	243.67
3.	Reinardt Janse van Rensburg (RSA)	206.67
4.	Azzedine Lagab (ALG)	181.33
5.	Abdelatif Saadoune (MAR)	168.67
6.	Natnael Berhane (ERI)	160.67
7.	Mouhssine Lahsaini (MAR)	140.67
8.	Yves Ngue Ngock (CMR)	132
9.	Meron Russom (ERI)	110
10.	Soufiane Haddi (MAR)	108

=== Team classification ===
Rank	Team	Points
1.	MTN–Qhubeka	653.68
2.	Groupement Sportif Petrolier Algérie	438.99
3.	Team Europcar	230
4.	Team Type 1–Sanofi	150
5.	SP Tableware	105
6.	Rietumu-Delfin	80
7.	Continental Team Astana	79
8.	Vélo Club Sovac Algérie	74.33
9.	Dukla Trenčín-Trek	59
10.	Konya–Torku Şekerspor	49

=== Nation classification ===
Rank	Nation	Points
1.	Morocco	1333.68
2.	South Africa	957.01
3.	Eritrea	643.01
4.	Algeria	602.99
5.	Cameroon	207
6.	Tunisia	191
7.	Rwanda	160.68
8.	Burkina Faso	141
9.	Ethiopia	42
10.	Ivory Coast	35.68

=== Nation under-23 classification ===
Rank	Nation under-23	Points
1.	Eritrea	459.34
2.	Morocco	299.67
3.	Algeria	156
4.	Ethiopia	37
5.	South Africa	33.67
6.	Tunisia	24
7.	Ivory Coast	15.67
8.	Cameroon	12
9.	Rwanda	3
10.	Egypt	2
