= Cycling at the 2021 Islamic Solidarity Games – Results =

These are the results of the Cycling at the 2021 Islamic Solidarity Games which took place between 5 and 13 August 2022 in Konya, Turkey.

== Road ==
=== Men ===
==== Road race ====
13 August

Rank	Athlete	Time
1st place, gold medalist(s)	Mohammad Ganjkhanloo (IRI)	2:58:08
2nd place, silver medalist(s)	Youcef Reguigui (ALG)	2:58:08
3rd place, bronze medalist(s)	Yousif Mirza (UAE)	2:58:08
4	Achraf Ed-Doghmy (MAR)	2:58:08
5	Mikel Demiri (ALB)	2:58:08
6	Azzedine Lagab (ALG)	2:58:08
7	Elchin Asadov (AZE)	2:58:08
8	Adil El-Arbaoui (MAR)	2:58:08
9	Anass Aït El-Abdia (MAR)	2:58:08
10	Oğuzhan Tiryaki (TUR)	2:58:08
11	Behnam Arian (IRI)	2:58:13
12	Amir Hossein Jamshidian (IRI)	2:58:13
13	Ali Asghar Mousazadeh (IRI)	2:58:16
14	Mohcine El-Kouraji (MAR)	2:58:16
15	Nasr-Eddine Maatougui (MAR)	2:58:17
16	Mustafa Sayar (TUR)	2:58:17
17	Nassim Saidi (ALG)	2:58:17
18	Muradjan Khalmuratov (UZB)	2:58:20
19	Ali Egin (TUR)	3:01:38
20	Burak Abay (TUR)	3:01:38
21	Akramjon Sunnatov (UZB)	3:03:43
22	Mohamed Amine Nehari (ALG)	3:03:43
23	Dmitriy Bocharov (UZB)	3:03:50
24	Aiman Cahyadi (INA)	3:03:50
25	Batuhan Özgür (TUR)	3:03:50
26	Islam Mansouri (ALG)	3:03:52
27	Musa Mikayilzade (AZE)	3:03:53
28	Elgun Alizada (AZE)	3:03:53
29	Ahmed Madan (BRN)	3:03:53
30	Abdulhadi Al-Ajmi (KUW)	3:03:53
31	Mazin Al-Riyami (OMA)	3:03:53
32	Bekhzodbek Rakhimbaev (UZB)	3:03:53
33	Shahin Eyvazov (AZE)	3:03:53
34	Jaber Al-Mansoori (UAE)	3:03:53
35	Hamza Mansouri (ALG)	3:04:00
36	Mundher Al-Hasani (OMA)	3:04:03
37	Muhammad Abbdurrohman (INA)	3:04:08
38	Aidin Aliyari (IRI)	3:07:39
39	Konstantin Elli (UZB)	3:07:42
40	Ahmed Naser (BRN)	3:07:42
41	Saif Al-Kaabi (UAE)	3:07:42
42	Mounir Makhchoun (MAR)	3:07:42
43	Bilal Al-Saadi (QAT)	3:07:42
44	Khalid Mayouf (UAE)	3:09:28
45	Ali Gurbanov (AZE)	3:09:28
46	Khaled Al-Khalifa (KUW)	3:19:27
47	Ahmed Al-Bardiny (QAT)	3:32:03
48	Said Al-Rahbi (OMA)	3:32:03
49	Waleed Al-Naqbi (UAE)	3:32:03
50	Abdulrahman Al-Yaqoobi (OMA)	3:32:03
51	Mohammed Al-Wahibi (OMA)	3:32:03
52	Hamad Al-Jaaidi (QAT)	3:32:03
53	Mohammad Zaman Hakimi (AFG)	3:34:30
54	Abdulrahman Al-Mansour (KUW)	3:34:30
—	El-Hadj Blal (MTN)	DNF
—	Ahmed Al-Mansoori (UAE)	DNF
—	Qais Haidari (AFG)	DNF
—	Mohammad Islam Jorat (AFG)	DNF
—	Yahiaaldien Khalefa (BRN)	DNF
—	Ahmed Sharief (QAT)	DNF
—	Mohamed Sraba (MTN)	DNF
—	Boilil Salem Emine (MTN)	DNF
—	Brikel Barci (ALB)	DNF
—	Najaf Baghirov (AZE)	DNF
—	Abdullah Al-Jaaidi (QAT)	DNF
—	Saied Jafer Al-Ali (KUW)	DNF
—	Ahmet Örken (TUR)	DNF
—	Edem Eminov (UZB)	DNF
—	Ssekyoba Emmanuel (UGA)	DNS
—	Abdunoor Lubega (UGA)	DNS

==== Individual time trial ====
11 August

Rank	Athlete	Time
1st place, gold medalist(s)	Ahmed Madan (BRN)	30:18.997
2nd place, silver medalist(s)	Saied Jafer Al-Ali (KUW)	30:55.292
3rd place, bronze medalist(s)	Aleksey Fomovskiy (UZB)	31:04.213
4	Azzedine Lagab (ALG)	31:13.101
5	Ahmet Örken (TUR)	31:14.508
6	Burak Abay (TUR)	31:25.353
7	Aidin Aliyari (IRI)	31:41.071
8	Behnam Arian (IRI)	31:45.600
9	Aiman Cahyadi (INA)	31:49.640
10	Ahmed Naser (BRN)	31:54.791
11	Muhammad Abbdurrohman (INA)	32:01.426
12	Elchin Asadov (AZE)	32:06.338
13	Muradjan Khalmuratov (UZB)	32:21.192
14	Hamza Mansouri (ALG)	32:38.002
15	Saif Al-Kaabi (UAE)	34:04.476
16	Ahmed Al-Bardiny (QAT)	34:17.025
17	Abdullah Al-Jaaidi (QAT)	34:24.731
18	Abdunoor Lubega (UGA)	35:57.261
19	Brikel Barci (ALB)	38:12.764
20	Qais Haidari (AFG)	38:28.328
21	Mohammad Zaman Hakimi (AFG)	38:33.760
—	Yousif Mirza (UAE)	DNS

=== Women ===
==== Road race ====
13 August

Rank	Athlete	Time
1st place, gold medalist(s)	Olga Zabelinskaya (UZB)	2:23:10
2nd place, silver medalist(s)	Margarita Misyurina (UZB)	2:32:21
3rd place, bronze medalist(s)	Mandana Dehghan (IRI)	2:32:22
4	Azize Bekar (TUR)	2:36:04
5	Ayustina Delia Priatna (INA)	2:36:04
6	Keziban Koyun (TUR)	2:36:04
7	Rinata Sultanova (KAZ)	2:36:06
8	Somayyeh Yazdani (IRI)	2:36:11
9	Shakhnoza Abdullaeva (UZB)	2:40:37
10	Svetlana Pachshenko (KAZ)	2:40:40
11	Faina Potapova (KAZ)	2:41:37
12	Marina Kuzmina (KAZ)	2:44:43
13	Viktoriya Sidorenko (AZE)	2:44:43
14	Anzhela Solovyeva (KAZ)	2:44:43
15	Forouzan Abdollahi (IRI)	2:44:43
16	Nafosat Kozieva (UZB)	2:47:55
17	Lala Abdurahmanova (AZE)	2:49:14
18	Mehlika Elmalı (TUR)	2:49:39
—	Fatma Sezer (TUR)	DNF
—	Dewika Mulya Sova (INA)	DNF
—	Sevim Gerçek (TUR)	DNF
—	Safia Al-Sayegh (UAE)	DNF
—	Zahra Hussain (UAE)	DNF
—	Shaikha Rashed (UAE)	DNF
—	Yanina Kuskova (UZB)	DNF
—	Madina Kakhkhorova (UZB)	DNF
—	Farishta Hafizi (AFG)	DNF

==== Individual time trial ====
11 August

Rank	Athlete	Time
1st place, gold medalist(s)	Olga Zabelinskaya (UZB)	21:20.531
2nd place, silver medalist(s)	Yanina Kuskova (UZB)	22:14.724
3rd place, bronze medalist(s)	Rinata Sultanova (KAZ)	22:44.257
4	Ayustina Delia Priatna (INA)	22:51.733
5	Mandana Dehghan (IRI)	23:56.553
6	Safia Al-Sayegh (UAE)	24:21.507
7	Keziban Koyun (TUR)	24:38.200
8	Marina Kuzmina (KAZ)	24:57.143
9	Viktoriya Sidorenko (AZE)	25:02.882
10	Zahra Hussain (UAE)	26:05.414
11	Lala Abdurahmanova (AZE)	26:38.380
12	Sevim Gerçek (TUR)	27:01.620
13	Farishta Hafizi (AFG)	30:59.840
—	Somayyeh Yazdani (IRI)	DNS

== Track ==
=== Men ===
==== Individual pursuit ====
6 August

Rank	Athlete	Qual.	3rd place	Final
1st place, gold medalist(s)	Alisher Zhumakan (KAZ)	4:22.023		4:22.607
2nd place, silver medalist(s)	Dmitriy Moskov (KAZ)	4:22.394		4:29.580
3rd place, bronze medalist(s)	Aleksey Fomovskiy (UZB)	4:27.149	4:25.234	
4	Aidin Aliyari (IRI)	4:25.369	4:26.839	
5	Abdul Azim Aliyas (MAS)	4:27.931		
6	Amir Hossein Jamshidian (IRI)	4:29.391		
7	Dmitriy Bocharov (UZB)	4:30.841		
8	Salah-Eddine Cherki (ALG)	4:32.411		
9	Aiman Cahyadi (INA)	4:32.623		
10	Ahmet Örken (TUR)	4:35.240		
11	Mohcine El-Kouraji (MAR)	4:36.130		
12	Achraf Ed-Doghmy (MAR)	4:36.867		
13	El-Khacib Sassane (ALG)	4:37.720		
14	Doğukan Arıkan (TUR)	4:38.408		
15	Lotfi Tchambaz (ALG)	4:38.784		
16	Zulhelmi Zainal (MAS)	4:39.957		
17	Elchin Asadov (AZE)	4:40.822		
18	Saif Al-Kaabi (UAE)	4:41.913		
19	Nasr-Eddine Maatougui (MAR)	4:42.911		
20	Feritcan Şamlı (TUR)	4:46.526		
21	Waleed Al-Naqbi (UAE)	4:46.842		
22	Amir Farhan Haizeman (MAS)	4:48.861		
23	Elgun Alizada (AZE)	4:49.107		
—	Musa Mikayilzade (AZE)	DNS		

==== Points race ====
7 August

Rank	Athlete	Score
1st place, gold medalist(s)	Yousif Mirza (UAE)	39
2nd place, silver medalist(s)	Behnam Arian (IRI)	17
3rd place, bronze medalist(s)	Ahmed Al-Mansoori (UAE)	17
4	Abdul Azim Aliyas (MAS)	14
5	Amir Hossein Jamshidian (IRI)	11
6	Musa Mikayilzade (AZE)	8
7	Salah-Eddine Cherki (ALG)	8
8	Oğuzhan Tiryaki (TUR)	6
9	Dmitriy Bocharov (UZB)	5
10	Gabiden Azen (KAZ)	−8
—	Edem Eminov (UZB)	DNF
—	Dmitriy Moskov (KAZ)	DNF
—	Mohcine El-Kouraji (MAR)	DNF
—	Achraf Ed-Doghmy (MAR)	DNF
—	Najaf Baghirov (AZE)	DNF
—	Batuhan Özgür (TUR)	DNF
—	Zulhelmi Zainal (MAS)	DNF
—	Mohamed Nadjib Assal (ALG)	DNF

==== Scratch ====
5 August

Rank	Athlete	Laps down
1st place, gold medalist(s)	Ahmed Al-Mansoori (UAE)	
2nd place, silver medalist(s)	Behnam Arian (IRI)	
3rd place, bronze medalist(s)	Alisher Zhumakan (KAZ)	
4	Botirjon Ismatov (UZB)	
5	Yacine Chalel (ALG)	−1
6	Oğuzhan Tiryaki (TUR)	−1
7	Artyom Zakharov (KAZ)	−1
8	Zulhelmi Zainal (MAS)	−1
9	El-Khacib Sassane (ALG)	−1
10	Mohammad Ganjkhanloo (IRI)	−1
11	Aiman Cahyadi (INA)	−1
12	Yousif Mirza (UAE)	−1
13	Mohcine El-Kouraji (MAR)	−1
14	Musa Mikayilzade (AZE)	−1
15	Achraf Ed-Doghmy (MAR)	−1
16	Amir Farhan Haizeman (MAS)	−2
—	Ahmet Örken (TUR)	DNF
—	Danil Evdokimov (UZB)	DNF
—	Najaf Baghirov (AZE)	DNF

==== Omnium ====
8 August

Rank	Athlete	Score
1st place, gold medalist(s)	Artyom Zakharov (KAZ)	156
2nd place, silver medalist(s)	Ahmed Al-Mansoori (UAE)	124
3rd place, bronze medalist(s)	Aleksey Fomovskiy (UZB)	123
4	Yousif Mirza (UAE)	112
5	Mohammad Ganjkhanloo (IRI)	110
6	Zulhelmi Zainal (MAS)	107
7	Abdul Azim Aliyas (MAS)	91
8	Ramis Dinmukhametov (KAZ)	91
9	Doğukan Arıkan (TUR)	80
10	Yacine Chalel (ALG)	78
11	Botirjon Ismatov (UZB)	64
12	Oğuzhan Tiryaki (TUR)	63
13	Aiman Cahyadi (INA)	56
14	Lotfi Tchambaz (ALG)	40
15	Behnam Arian (IRI)	34
—	Elgun Alizada (AZE)	DNF
—	Amral Abdulazizli (AZE)	DNF
—	Nasr-Eddine Maatougui (MAR)	DNF
—	Mounir Makhchoun (MAR)	DNF

=== Women ===
==== Individual pursuit ====
6 August

Rank	Athlete	Qual.	3rd place	Final
1st place, gold medalist(s)	Rinata Sultanova (KAZ)	3:37.973		3:36.662
2nd place, silver medalist(s)	Yanina Kuskova (UZB)	3:38.479		3:41.316
3rd place, bronze medalist(s)	Marina Kuzmina (KAZ)	3:48.020	3:45.596	
4	Nur Aisyah Zubir (MAS)	3:49.295	3:47.641	
5	Anna Kuskova (UZB)	3:50.784		
6	Nyo Ci Hui (MAS)	3:51.438		
7	Somayyeh Yazdani (IRI)	3:54.529		
8	Nor Aisyah Munirah Chek Ramli (MAS)	3:54.815		
9	Keziban Koyun (TUR)	3:55.163		
10	Margarita Misyurina (UZB)	3:55.720		
11	Azize Bekar (TUR)	4:00.968		
12	Zahra Hussain (UAE)	4:06.496		
13	Mandana Dehghan (IRI)	4:11.000		
14	Lala Abdurahmanova (AZE)	4:16.727		
—	Viktoriya Sidorenko (AZE)	DNS		

==== Points race ====
7 August

Rank	Athlete	Score
1st place, gold medalist(s)	Olga Zabelinskaya (UZB)	58
2nd place, silver medalist(s)	Yanina Kuskova (UZB)	53
3rd place, bronze medalist(s)	Svetlana Pachshenko (KAZ)	14
4	Ayan Khankishiyeva (AZE)	13
5	Somayyeh Yazdani (IRI)	12
6	Nur Aisyah Zubir (MAS)	11
7	Faina Potapova (KAZ)	9
8	Keziban Koyun (TUR)	6
9	Azize Bekar (TUR)	0
10	Nor Aisyah Munirah Chek Ramli (MAS)	−37
11	Forouzan Abdollahi (IRI)	−40
12	Shaikha Rashed (UAE)	−40
—	Viktoriya Sidorenko (AZE)	DNF

==== Scratch ====
5 August

Rank	Athlete	Laps down
1st place, gold medalist(s)	Rinata Sultanova (KAZ)	
2nd place, silver medalist(s)	Nur Aisyah Zubir (MAS)	
3rd place, bronze medalist(s)	Sofiya Karimova (UZB)	
4	Ayan Khankishiyeva (AZE)	
5	Anzhela Solovyeva (KAZ)	
6	Ayustina Delia Priatna (INA)	
7	Somayyeh Yazdani (IRI)	
8	Azize Bekar (TUR)	
9	Keziban Koyun (TUR)	
10	Nafosat Kozieva (UZB)	
11	Forouzan Abdollahi (IRI)	
12	Nyo Ci Hui (MAS)	
13	Viktoriya Sidorenko (AZE)	
14	Shaikha Rashed (UAE)	−2

==== Omnium ====
8 August

Rank	Athlete	Score
1st place, gold medalist(s)	Rinata Sultanova (KAZ)	120
2nd place, silver medalist(s)	Ayustina Delia Priatna (INA)	115
3rd place, bronze medalist(s)	Nur Aisyah Zubir (MAS)	107
4	Olga Zabelinskaya (UZB)	107
5	Marina Kuzmina (KAZ)	97
6	Nyo Ci Hui (MAS)	96
7	Margarita Misyurina (UZB)	92
8	Somayyeh Yazdani (IRI)	90
9	Ayan Khankishiyeva (AZE)	86
10	Keziban Koyun (TUR)	79
11	Azize Bekar (TUR)	34
12	Viktoriya Sidorenko (AZE)	29
13	Forouzan Abdollahi (IRI)	11
14	Shaikha Rashed (UAE)	−10
