= 2011 UCI Road World Championships – Men's road race =

Men's Individual Road Race
2011 UCI Road World Championships
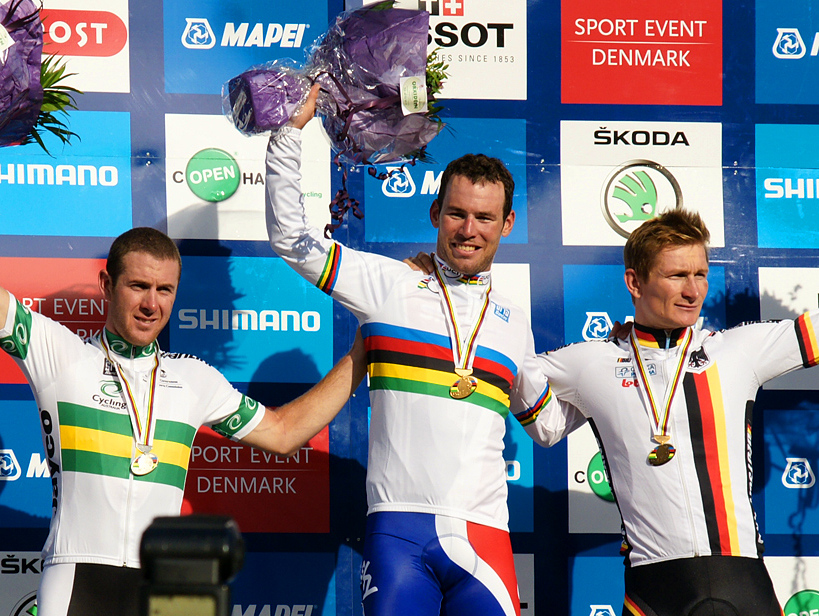
- Matthew Goss, Mark Cavendish and André Greipel on the podium

Race details
- Dates: 25 September 2011
- Stages: 1
- Distance: 260 km (161.6 mi)
- Winning time: 5h 40' 27"

Medalists
	Gold	Mark Cavendish (Great Britain)
	Silver	Matthew Goss (Australia)
	Bronze	André Greipel (Germany)

The Men's Road Race of the 2011 UCI Road World Championships cycling event took place on 25 September 2011 in Copenhagen, Denmark.

In a sprint to the finish line, Great Britain's Mark Cavendish became world champion after making his move down the right-hand side of the course, and just managed to hold off the rest of the field, to become his country's first road race world champion since Tom Simpson won the event in San Sebastián in 1965. The silver medal went to Australia's Matthew Goss – a team-mate of Cavendish on the HTC–Highroad team – with the bronze medal going to Germany's André Greipel.

== Route ==
The race started in the square at Copenhagen City Hall. For the second consecutive time, the World Championship route started and finished in different locations, with the riders completing 28 km (17.4 mi) – including a 6 km (3.7 mi) neutralised section – before reaching the finishing circuit in Rudersdal. Having reached Rudersdal, the riders then completed seventeen laps of the 14 km (8.7 mi) circuit around the suburbs of Søllerød and Nærum, to make up the racing distance of 260 km (161.6 mi).

== Race report ==
The field started quickly, with an average speed close to 50 km/h (31 mph) for the first half-hour of racing, as breaks went and were brought back. Finally a breakaway formed, which consisted of seven riders: in the break were Oleg Chuzhda, Maxim Iglinsky, Tanel Kangert, Robert Kišerlovski, Pablo Lastras, Christian Poos and Anthony Roux. As the lead rose up to eight minutes, the Great Britain team began to increase the pace of the peloton to start chasing the group and lower their lead. The lead was brought back to about four minutes, mainly due to the work of Steve Cummings and David Millar.

At that point, a first attack came from the main group at the end of the eleventh lap. Johan Vansummeren accelerated and took Yoann Offredo and Luca Paolini with him. Soon after they were joined by Olivier Kaisen and Simon Clarke. These five riders began to eat into the lead break's advantage, with Offredo staying mostly at the back of the line with his teammate Roux up ahead.

Both groups ahead merged, creating a group of eleven riders at the front, as Christian Poos had dropped out and fell back into the peloton. The peloton itself, still being led by the British, had split as result of a fall in the thirteenth lap, causing some big names to fall back and never catch up with the main pack, including amongst others the defending champion Thor Hushovd, 2011 time trial world champion Tony Martin and quick finisher Greg Van Avermaet.

The pack closed the gap to about one minute, with several riders trying to bridge the gap between the peloton and the leading bunch in small groups. Eventually all riders were brought back, with Anthony Roux surviving the longest, only to be caught by his countryman Thomas Voeckler as he stormed past to form a new leading group in the penultimate lap together with Nicki Sørensen and Klaas Lodewyck. These three never got more than 25 seconds and were held very close by the peloton. Johnny Hoogerland managed to bridge the gap to the leaders, but was caught together with the three a few kilometres later. No riders managed to get away from the bunch after that, allowing Mark Cavendish to finish the work of his teammates in the sprint. Matthew Goss was a close second, while André Greipel needed a photo finish to hold off Fabian Cancellara for bronze. Jürgen Roelandts completed the top five.

== National qualification ==
After a meeting of the UCI Management Committee on 28 January 2011, the qualification system for the 2011 road race remained unchanged from 2010. Results from January to the middle of August would count towards the qualification criteria on both the UCI World Tour and the UCI Continental Circuits across the world, with the rankings being determined upon the release of the numerous tour rankings on 15 August 2011.

=== UCI World Tour ===
The top ten nations in the UCI World Tour rankings by individual nations, may register up to fourteen different riders, of which nine could compete in the event. A nation with less than nine riders in the individual classification of the UCI World Tour rankings would only be allowed to start the race with the number of riders that were classified. If this number is less than six, the country would still allocate six riders for the competition; but could still reach the original allocation via the Continental Circuits. Prior to that re-allocation, any unused allocations within the top ten placings are re-allocated to countries that were ranked eleventh downwards on 15 August 2011, until the places were filled. Other countries could also enter teams into the race through individual riders in the World Tour rankings, if they had at least one rider in the top 100 placings overall, or had one rider listed outside the top 100, but still ranked.

=== UCI Continental Circuits ===
In each of the five continental tours held beneath the UCI World Tour, places could be earned through the rankings by nation. As many as sixteen places were offered through one of these continental tours – through the UCI Europe Tour – to as few as the overall winner of the UCI Oceania Tour. Similar to the UCI World Tour, other countries could also enter teams into the race through individual riders in their continental rankings, if they had at least one rider ranked overall.

=== Entrants by country ===
14 to be enrolled, 9 to start
Spain
Italy
Australia
Belgium
Germany
United States
Netherlands
France
12 to be enrolled, 8 to start
Great Britain
9 to be enrolled, 6 to start
Luxembourg
Morocco
Colombia
Venezuela
Iran
Slovenia
Russia
Portugal
Poland
Ukraine
Croatia
Denmark
6 to be enrolled, 4 to start
Kazakhstan
Norway
Switzerland
5 to be enrolled, 3 to start
Eritrea
Brazil
Argentina
Chile
Japan
Turkey
Lithuania
Austria
Czech Republic
Estonia
Belarus
Bulgaria
Sweden
New Zealand
Canada
Ireland
Slovakia
2 to be enrolled, 1 to start
Costa Rica
Latvia
Algeria
Cuba
Uruguay
Ecuador
Hungary
Greece
Romania
Serbia

== Final classification ==
Of the race's 210 entrants, 177 completed the full distance of 260 km (161.6 mi). 32 riders failed to finish the race and Roman Kreuziger pulled out due to a wrist injury prior to the race.

Rank	Rider	Country	Time
1	Mark Cavendish	Great Britain	5h 40' 27"
1	Matthew Goss	Australia	s.t.
1	André Greipel	Germany	s.t.
4	Fabian Cancellara	Switzerland	s.t.
5	Jürgen Roelandts	Belgium	s.t.
6	Romain Feillu	France	s.t.
7	Borut Božič	Slovenia	s.t.
8	Edvald Boasson Hagen	Norway	s.t.
9	Óscar Freire	Spain	s.t.
10	Tyler Farrar	United States	s.t.
11	Denis Galimzyanov	Russia	s.t.
12	Peter Sagan	Slovakia	s.t.
13	Anthony Ravard	France	s.t.
14	Daniele Bennati	Italy	s.t.
15	Rui Costa	Portugal	s.t.
16	Manuel Antonio Cardoso	Portugal	s.t.
17	Philippe Gilbert	Belgium	s.t.
18	Michael Mørkøv	Denmark	s.t.
19	David Veilleux	Canada	s.t.
20	Grega Bole	Slovenia	s.t.
21	Pim Ligthart	Netherlands	s.t.
22	Aleksejs Saramotins	Latvia	s.t.
23	Denys Kostyuk	Ukraine	s.t.
24	Taylor Phinney	United States	s.t.
25	Gediminas Bagdonas	Lithuania	s.t.
26	Jakob Fuglsang	Denmark	s.t.
27	Yauheni Hutarovich	Belarus	s.t.
28	Marek Rutkiewicz	Poland	s.t.
29	Lars Boom	Netherlands	s.t.
30	Takashi Miyazawa	Japan	s.t.
31	Michał Kwiatkowski	Poland	s.t.
32	Lars Bak	Denmark	s.t.
33	Aleksandr Kuschynski	Belarus	s.t.
34	Matija Kvasina	Croatia	s.t.
35	Johnny Hoogerland	Netherlands	s.t.
36	Matt Brammeier	Ireland	s.t.
37	Yoann Offredo	France	s.t.
38	Maciej Paterski	Poland	s.t.
39	Thomas Löfkvist	Sweden	s.t.
40	Sacha Modolo	Italy	s.t.
41	André Cardoso	Portugal	s.t.
42	Heinrich Haussler	Australia	s.t.
43	Nicki Sørensen	Denmark	s.t.
44	Maarten Tjallingii	Netherlands	s.t.
45	Gorazd Štangelj	Slovenia	s.t.
46	Thomas Rohregger	Austria	s.t.
47	Gabriel Rasch	Norway	s.t.
48	Nick Nuyens	Belgium	s.t.
49	Juan José Haedo	Argentina	s.t.
50	Janez Brajkovič	Slovenia	s.t.
51	Nicolas Roche	Ireland	s.t.
52	Björn Leukemans	Belgium	s.t.
53	Tony Gallopin	France	s.t.
54	Fredrik Kessiakoff	Sweden	s.t.
55	Rene Mandri	Estonia	s.t.
56	Oleg Chuzhda	Ukraine	s.t.
57	Anders Lund	Denmark	s.t.
58	Filipe Cardoso	Portugal	s.t.
59	Ricardo Mestre	Portugal	s.t.
60	Pieter Weening	Netherlands	s.t.
61	José Joaquín Rojas	Spain	s.t.
62	Bauke Mollema	Netherlands	s.t.
63	Klaas Lodewyck	Belgium	s.t.
64	Pavel Brutt	Russia	s.t.
65	Brent Bookwalter	United States	s.t.
66	Jure Kocjan	Slovenia	s.t.
67	Ignatas Konovalovas	Lithuania	s.t.
68	Peter Velits	Slovakia	s.t.
69	Martin Velits	Slovakia	s.t.
70	Sylvain Chavanel	France	s.t.
71	Aidis Kruopis	Lithuania	s.t.
72	Christopher Sutton	Australia	s.t.
73	Grégory Rast	Switzerland	s.t.
74	Baden Cooke	Australia	s.t.
75	Danilo Hondo	Germany	s.t.
76	Robert Kišerlovski	Croatia	s.t.
77	Francesco Gavazzi	Italy	s.t.
78	Carlos Barredo	Spain	s.t.
79	Simon Gerrans	Australia	s.t.
80	Elia Viviani	Italy	s.t.
81	Geraint Thomas	Great Britain	s.t.
82	Daniel Oss	Italy	s.t.
83	Juan Manuel Gárate	Spain	+ 16"
84	Kurt Asle Arvesen	Norway	+ 16"
85	Vladimir Isaichev	Russia	+ 16"
86	Michael Albasini	Switzerland	+ 19"
87	Martin Kohler	Switzerland	+ 19"
88	Wout Poels	Netherlands	+ 19"
89	Steven Kruijswijk	Netherlands	+ 19"
90	Dan Martin	Ireland	+ 19"
91	Stuart O'Grady	Australia	+ 19"
92	Imanol Erviti	Spain	+ 19"
93	Kevin De Weert	Belgium	+ 19"
94	Ben King	United States	+ 19"
95	Juan Antonio Flecha	Spain	+ 19"
96	Marcel Sieberg	Germany	+ 26"
97	Pablo Lastras	Spain	+ 29"
98	Thomas Voeckler	France	+ 31"
99	Ian Stannard	Great Britain	+ 34"
100	Mathew Hayman	Australia	+ 34"
101	Michael Rogers	Australia	+ 38"
102	Simon Clarke	Australia	+ 38"
103	Manuel Quinziato	Italy	+ 42"
104	Matteo Tosatto	Italy	+ 49"
105	Kristijan Koren	Slovenia	+ 49"

Rank	Rider	Country	Time
106	Luca Paolini	Italy	+ 52"
107	Giovanni Visconti	Italy	+ 1' 02"
108	Bradley Wiggins	Great Britain	+ 3' 14"
109	Olivier Kaisen	Belgium	+ 4' 00"
110	Mart Ojavee	Estonia	+ 4' 00"
111	John Degenkolb	Germany	+ 4' 00"
112	Maxim Iglinsky	Kazakhstan	+ 4' 00"
113	Anthony Roux	France	+ 6' 34"
114	David Millar	Great Britain	+ 8' 22"
115	Jeremy Hunt	Great Britain	+ 8' 22"
116	Miguel Ubeto	Venezuela	+ 8' 54"
117	Jonas Ljungblad	Sweden	+ 8' 54"
118	Greg Henderson	New Zealand	+ 8' 54"
119	Rafael Andriato	Brazil	+ 8' 54"
120	Fumiyuki Beppu	Japan	+ 8' 54"
121	Jack Bauer	New Zealand	+ 8' 54"
122	Nelson Oliveira	Portugal	+ 8' 54"
123	Mehdi Sohrabi	Iran	+ 8' 54"
124	José Serpa	Colombia	+ 8' 54"
125	Ioannis Tamouridis	Greece	+ 8' 54"
126	Hossein Askari	Iran	+ 8' 54"
127	Carlos José Ochoa	Venezuela	+ 8' 54"
128	Miguel Ángel Rubiano	Colombia	+ 8' 54"
129	Chris Anker Sørensen	Denmark	+ 8' 54"
130	Tomás Gil	Venezuela	+ 8' 54"
131	Christian Knees	Germany	+ 8' 54"
132	Lucas Sebastián Haedo	Argentina	+ 8' 54"
133	Yukiya Arashiro	Japan	+ 8' 54"
134	Andrei Nechita	Romania	+ 8' 54"
135	Rigoberto Urán	Colombia	+ 8' 54"
136	Maximiliano Richeze	Argentina	+ 8' 54"
137	Hrvoje Miholjević	Croatia	+ 8' 54"
138	Winner Anacona	Colombia	+ 8' 54"
139	Svein Tuft	Canada	+ 8' 54"
140	Radoslav Rogina	Croatia	+ 8' 54"
141	Iván Casas	Colombia	+ 8' 54"
142	Kristijan Đurasek	Croatia	+ 8' 54"
143	Daniel Teklehaymanot	Eritrea	+ 8' 54"
144	Yuriy Metlushenko	Ukraine	+ 8' 54"
145	Oleksandr Sheydyk	Ukraine	+ 8' 54"
146	Carlos Oyarzun	Chile	+ 8' 54"
147	Anatoliy Pakhtusov	Ukraine	+ 8' 54"
148	Gonzalo Garrido	Chile	+ 8' 54"
149	Gregolry Panizo	Brazil	+ 8' 54"
150	Laurent Didier	Luxembourg	+ 8' 54"
151	Michał Gołaś	Poland	+ 8' 54"
152	Julian Dean	New Zealand	+ 8' 54"
153	Oleksandr Kvachuk	Ukraine	+ 8' 54"
154	Ben Gastauer	Luxembourg	+ 8' 54"
155	Maciej Bodnar	Poland	+ 8' 54"
156	Bartosz Huzarski	Poland	+ 8' 54"
157	Matthew Busche	United States	+ 8' 54"
158	Bernhard Eisel	Austria	+ 8' 54"
159	Mikhail Ignatiev	Russia	+ 8' 54"
160	Alexander Porsev	Russia	+ 8' 54"
161	Timofey Kritskiy	Russia	+ 8' 54"
162	Yevgeniy Nepomnyachshiy	Kazakhstan	+ 8' 54"
163	Sergey Renev	Kazakhstan	+ 8' 54"
164	Luis León Sánchez	Spain	+ 8' 54"
165	Niki Terpstra	Netherlands	+ 8' 54"
166	Tony Martin	Germany	+ 8' 54"
167	John Murphy	United States	+ 8' 54"
168	Kanstantsin Sivtsov	Belarus	+ 8' 54"
169	Dmitry Fofonov	Kazakhstan	+ 8' 54"
170	Thor Hushovd	Norway	+ 8' 54"
171	Andreas Klier	Germany	+ 8' 54"
172	Samuel Dumoulin	France	+ 8' 54"
173	Jeff Louder	United States	+ 8' 54"
174	Timmy Duggan	United States	+ 8' 54"
175	Greg Van Avermaet	Belgium	+ 9' 10"
176	Marcel Kittel	Germany	+ 9' 16"
177	Johan Vansummeren	Belgium	+ 9' 16"
	Steve Cummings	Great Britain	DNF
	Tanel Kangert	Estonia	DNF
	Chris Froome	Great Britain	DNF
	Abdelati Saâdoune	Morocco	DNF
	Honorio Machado	Venezuela	DNF
	Amir Zargari	Iran	DNF
	Ferekalsi Debesay	Eritrea	DNF
	Jan Bárta	Czech Republic	DNF
	Andrei Sartassov	Chile	DNF
	Krisztián Lovassy	Hungary	DNF
	Semere Mengis	Eritrea	DNF
	Adil Jelloul	Morocco	DNF
	Bert Grabsch	Germany	DNF
	Jempy Drucker	Luxembourg	DNF
	Fränk Schleck	Luxembourg	DNF
	Ivan Stević	Serbia	DNF
	Michael Barry	Canada	DNF
	Stefan Denifl	Austria	DNF
	Tomislav Dančulović	Croatia	DNF
	Mert Mutlu	Turkey	DNF
	Leonardo Duque	Colombia	DNF
	Blel Kadri	France	DNF
	Petr Benčík	Czech Republic	DNF
	Artur García	Venezuela	DNF
	Andrew Talansky	United States	DNF
	Vicente Reynés	Spain	DNF
	Christian Poos	Luxembourg	DNF
	Adnane Aarbia	Morocco	DNF
	Mouhssine Lahsaini	Morocco	DNF
	Ismail Ayoune	Morocco	DNF
	Mohammed Said El Ammoury	Morocco	DNF
	Otávio Bulgarelli	Brazil	DNF
	Roman Kreuziger	Czech Republic	DNS
