= 2018 La Tropicale Amissa Bongo =

2018 UCI Africa Tour

Race details
- Dates: January 15–21, 2018
- Stages: 7
- Distance: 1,011.1 km (628.3 mi)
- Winning time: 23h 52' 24"

Results
Jersey awarded to the overall winner	Winner	Joseph Areruya (RWA)	(Rwanda national Team)
	Second	Nikodemus Holler (GER)	(Bike Aid)
	Third	Damien Gaudin (FRA)	(Direct Énergie)
Jersey awarded to the points classification winner	Points	Brenton Jones (AUS)	(Delko–Marseille Provence KTM)
Jersey awarded to the mountains classification winner	Mountains	Tesfom Okubamariam (ERI)	(Eritrea national Team)
Jersey awarded to the young rider classification winner	Young rider	Joseph Areruya (RWA)	(Rwanda national Team)
Jersey awarded to the sprints classification winner	Sprints	Tesfom Okubamariam (ERI)	(Rwanda national Team)
	Team	Bike Aid	

The 2018 La Tropicale Amissa Bongo was a road cycling stage race that took place in Gabon with an incursion into neighboring Cameroon between 15 and 21 January 2018. The race was rated as a 2.1 event as part of the 2018 UCI Africa Tour, and was the 13th edition of the Tropicale Amissa Bongo.

== Teams ==
The 16 teams invited to the race were:

UCI Professional Continental teams

- Direct Énergie
- Wilier Triestina–Selle Italia
- Delko–Marseille Provence KTM

UCI Continental teams

- Bike Aid
- Sporting / Tavira
- Sovac–Natura4Ever

National teams

- Eritrea
- Morocco
- Rwanda
- Gabon
- Ethiopia
- Ivory Coast
- Burkina Faso
- Tunisia
- Cameroon

== Stages ==
Stage characteristics and winners
Stage	Date	Course	Distance	Type	Winner
1	15 January	Kango to Lambaréné	146.6 km (91 mi)	Hilly stage	Lucas Carstensen
2	16 January	Ndendé to Fougamou	173 km (107 mi)	Flat stage	Brenton Jones
3	17 January	Fougamou to Lambaréné	114 km (71 mi)	Hilly stage	Rinaldo Nocentini
4	18 January	Ndjolé to Mitzic	182.5 km (113 mi)	Mountain stage	Joseph Areruya
5	19 January	Oyem to Ambam (Cameroon)	141.4 km (88 mi)	Hilly stage	Brenton Jones
6	20 January	Bitam to Oyem	107 km (66 mi)	Hilly stage	Rinaldo Nocentini
7	21 January	Bikelé to Libreville	139.5 km (87 mi)	Flat stage	Luca Pacioni
	Total		1,011.1 km (628 mi)		

== Classification leadership ==
Classification leadership by stage
Stage	Winner	General classification	Mountains classification	Points classification	Sprints classification	Young rider classification	Best African rider classification	Team classification
1	Lucas Carstensen	Lucas Carstensen	Soufiane Haddi	Lucas Carstensen	Soufiane Haddi	Henok Mulubrhan	Soufiane Haddi	Bike Aid
2	Brenton Jones	Lucas Carstensen	Henok Mulubrhan	Lucas Carstensen	Joseph Areruya	Henok Mulubrhan	Henok Mulubrhan	Bike Aid
3	Rinaldo Nocentini	Brenton Jones	Salah Eddine Mraouni	Luca Pacioni	Mikiel Habtom	Henok Mulubrhan	Salah Eddine Mraouni	Direct Énergie
4	Joseph Areruya	Joseph Areruya	Sirak Tesfom	Brenton Jones	Mikiel Habtom	Joseph Areruya	Joseph Areruya	Bike Aid
5	Brenton Jones	Joseph Areruya	Sirak Tesfom	Brenton Jones	Damien Gaudin	Joseph Areruya	Joseph Areruya	Bike Aid
6	Rinaldo Nocentini	Joseph Areruya	Sirak Tesfom	Brenton Jones	Tesfom Okubamariam	Joseph Areruya	Joseph Areruya	Bike Aid
7	Luca Pacioni	Joseph Areruya	Tesfom Okubamariam	Brenton Jones	Tesfom Okubamariam	Joseph Areruya	Joseph Areruya	Bike Aid
Final		Joseph Areruya	Tesfom Okubamariam	Brenton Jones	Tesfom Okubamariam	Joseph Areruya	Joseph Areruya	Bike Aid

== Final standings ==
Legend
General classification	Denotes the winner of the general classification	Mountains classification	Denotes the leader of the mountains classification
Points classification	Denotes the leader of the points classification	Sprints classification	Denotes the leader of the sprints classification
Young rider classification	Denotes the winner of the young rider classification	Best African rider classification	Denotes the leader of the best African rider classification

=== General classification ===
Final general classification (1–10)
Rank	Rider	Team	Time
1	Joseph Areruya (RWA)	Rwanda national Team	23h 52' 24"
2	Nikodemus Holler (GER)	Bike Aid	+ 18"
3	Damien Gaudin (FRA)	Direct Énergie	+ 50"
4	Ilia Koshevoy (BLR)	Wilier Triestina–Selle Italia	+ 1' 51"
5	Brenton Jones (AUS)	Delko–Marseille Provence KTM	+ 7' 27"
6	Rinaldo Nocentini (ITA)	Sporting / Tavira	+ s.t."
7	Youcef Reguigui (ALG)	Sovac–Natura4Ever	+ 7' 43"
8	Adrien Petit (FRA)	Direct Énergie	+ 7' 51"
9	Salah Eddine Mraouni (MAR)	Morocco national Team	+ 7' 55"
10	Salim Kipkemboi (KEN)	Bike Aid	+ 8' 01"

=== Mountains classification ===
Final mountains classification (1–10)
Rank	Rider	Team	Points
1	Tesfom Okubamariam (ERI)	Eritrea national team	22
2	Sirak Tesfom (ERI)	Eritrea national team	19
3	Salah Eddine Mraouni (MAR)	Morocco national team	18
4	Mohcine El Kouraji (MAR)	Morocco national team	17
5	Joseph Areruya (RWA)	Rwanda national team	9
6	Henok Mulubrhan (ERI)	Eritrea national team	9
7	Alejandro Marque (ESP)	Sporting / Tavira	8
8	Damien Gaudin (FRA)	Direct Énergie	8
9	Mikiel Habtom (ERI)	Eritrea national team	6
10	Rinaldo Nocentini (ITA)	Sporting / Tavira	5

=== Points classification ===
Final points classification (1–10)
Rank	Rider	Team	Points
1	Brenton Jones (AUS)	Delko–Marseille Provence KTM	165
2	Youcef Reguigui (ALG)	Sovac–Natura4Ever	148
3	Luca Pacioni (ITA)	Wilier Triestina–Selle Italia	139
4	Rinaldo Nocentini (ITA)	Sporting / Tavira	106
5	Adrien Petit (FRA)	Direct Énergie	96
6	Lucas Carstensen (GER)	Bike Aid	93
7	Nikodemus Holler (GER)	Bike Aid	90
8	Salah Eddine Mraouni (MAR)	Morocco national team	81
9	Henok Mulubrhan (ERI)	Eritrea national team	71
10	Joseph Areruya (RWA)	Rwanda national team	70

=== Sprints classification ===
Final sprints classification (1–10)
Rank	Rider	Team	Points
1	Tesfom Okubamariam (ERI)	Eritrea national team	16
2	Mohcine El Kouraji (MAR)	Morocco national team	15
3	Damien Gaudin (FRA)	Direct Énergie	11
4	Mikiel Habtom (ERI)	Eritrea national team	11
5	Joseph Areruya (RWA)	Rwanda national Team	9
6	Nicola Toffali (ITA)	Sporting / Tavira	7
7	Temesgen Buru (ETH)	Ethiopia national team	7
8	Nikodemus Holler (GER)	Bike Aid	6
9	Salah Eddine Mraouni (MAR)	Morocco national Team	6
10	Henok Mulubrhan (ERI)	Eritrea national team	5

=== Young rider classification ===
Final young rider classification (1–10)
Rank	Rider	Team	Time
1	Joseph Areruya (RWA)	Rwanda national Team	23h 52' 24"
2	Salim Kipkemboi (KEN)	Bike Aid	+ 8' 01"
3	Fiseha Gebremariam (ETH)	Ethiopia national team	+ 8' 09"
4	Henok Mulubrhan (ERI)	Eritrea national team	+ 8' 20"
5	Saymon Musie Mehari (ERI)	Eritrea national team	+ 10' 59"
6	Meron Abraham (ERI)	Bike Aid	+ 11' 35"
7	Mohcine El Kouraji (MAR)	Morocco national team	+ 13' 18"
8	Luca Raggio (ITA)	Wilier Triestina–Selle Italia	+ 14' 46"
9	Simone Bevilacqua (ITA)	Wilier Triestina–Selle Italia	+ 17' 26"
10	Massimo Rosa (ITA)	Wilier Triestina–Selle Italia	+ 17' 52"

=== Best African rider classification ===
Final best African rider classification (1–10)
Rank	Rider	Team	Points
1	Joseph Areruya (RWA)	Rwanda national Team	23h 52' 24"
2	Salah Eddine Mraouni (MAR)	Morocco national team	+ 7' 55"
3	Hailemelekot Hailu (ETH)	Ethiopia national team	+ 8' 01"
4	Lahcen Saber (MAR)	Morocco national team	+ 8' 08"
5	Fiseha Gebremariam (ETH)	Ethiopia national team	+ 8' 09"
6	Henok Mulubrhan (ERI)	Eritrea national team	+ 8' 20"
7	Tesfom Okubamariam (ERI)	Eritrea national team	+ 8' 36"
8	Damien Tekou (CMR)	Cameroon national team	+ 8' 43"
9	Sirak Tesfom (ERI)	Eritrea national team	+ 10' 11"
10	Saymon Musie Mehari (ERI)	Eritrea national team	+ 10' 59"

=== Team classification ===
Final team classification (1–10)
Rank	Team	Time
1	Bike Aid	71h 53' 42"
2	Direct Énergie	+ 1' 02"
3	Wilier Triestina–Selle Italia	+ 1' 52"
4	Eritrea national team	+ 7' 34"
5	Sporting / Tavira	+ 8' 30"
6	Morocco national team	+ 9' 05"
7	Delko–Marseille Provence KTM	+ 11' 10"
8	Ethiopia national team	+ 11' 19"
9	Rwanda national team	+ 23' 47"
10	Tunisia national team	+ 24' 24"
