= 2010–11 UCI Africa Tour =

- Seventh edition of the UCI Africa Tour

Details
- Dates: 6 October 2010–24 July 2011
- Location: Africa
- Races: 23

Champions
- Individual champion: Adil Jelloul (MAR)
- Teams' champion: Groupement Sportif Petrolier Algérie
- Nations' champion: Morocco

The 2010–11 UCI Africa Tour was the seventh season of the UCI Africa Tour. The season began on 6 October 2010 with the Grand Prix Chantal Biya and ended on 24 July 2011 with the Tour of Eritrea.

The points leader, based on the cumulative results of previous races, wears the UCI Africa Tour cycling jersey. Abdelatif Saadoune of Morocco was the defending champion of the 2009–10 UCI Africa Tour. Adil Jelloul of Morocco was crowned as the 2010–11 UCI Africa Tour champion.

Throughout the season, points are awarded to the top finishers of stages within stage races and the final general classification standings of each of the stages races and one-day events. The quality and complexity of a race also determines how many points are awarded to the top finishers, the higher the UCI rating of a race, the more points are awarded. The UCI ratings from highest to lowest are as follows:

- Multi-day events: 2.HC, 2.1 and 2.2
- One-day events: 1.HC, 1.1 and 1.2

== Events ==
=== 2010 ===
Date	Race Name	Location	UCI Rating	Winner	Team
6–9 October	Grand Prix Chantal Biya	Cameroon	2.2	Martinien Tega (CMR)	SNH Vélo Club
22–31 October	Tour du Faso	Burkina Faso	2.2	Julien Schick (FRA)	Team Reine Blanche
4 November	GP Sakia El Hamra	Morocco	1.2	Mouhssine Lahsaini (MAR)	Morocco (national team A)
5 November	GP Oued Eddahab	Morocco	1.2	Abdelatif Saadoune (MAR)	Morocco (national team B)
6 November	GP Al Massira	Morocco	1.2	Tarik Chaoufi (MAR)	Morocco (national team A)
10 November	African Continental Championships – Team Time Trial	Rwanda	CC	Daniel Teklehaymanot (ERI); Meron Russom (ERI); Tesfai Teklit (ERI); Freqalsi Debesay (ERI)	Eritrea (national team)
12 November	African Continental Championships – Time Trial	Rwanda	CC	Daniel Teklehaymanot (ERI)	Eritrea (national team)
14 November	African Continental Championships – Road Race	Rwanda	CC	Daniel Teklehaymanot (ERI)	Eritrea (national team)
17–25 Nov	Tour of Rwanda	Rwanda	2.2	Daniel Teklehaymanot (ERI)	Eritrea (national team)

=== 2011 ===
Date	Race Name	Location	UCI Rating	Winner	Team
25–30 January	La Tropicale Amissa Bongo	Gabon	2.1	Anthony Charteau (FRA)	Team Europcar
19–26 February	Tour of South Africa	South Africa	2.2	Kristian House (GBR)	Rapha Condor-Sharp
27 February – 7 March	Tour du Cameroun	Cameroon	2.2	Oumarou Minoungou (BUR)	Burkina Faso (national team)
25 March – 3 April	Tour du Maroc	Morocco	2.2	Mouhssine Lahsaini (MAR)	Morocco (national team A)
7 April	Challenge Khouribga	Morocco	1.2	Maroš Kováč (SVK)	Dukla Trencin-Merida
8 April	Challenge Youssoufia	Morocco	1.2	Adil Jelloul (MAR)	Morocco (national team)
9 April	Challenge Ben Guerir	Morocco	1.2	Hassan Zahboune (MAR)	Morocco (national team)
6 May	Trophée Princier	Morocco	1.2	Azzedine Lagab (ALG)	Groupement Sportif Petrolier Algérie
7 May	Trophée de l'Anniversaire	Morocco	1.2	Volodymyr Bileka (UKR)	Amore & Vita
8 May	Trophée de la Maison Royale	Morocco	1.2	Vladislav Borisov (RUS)	Amore & Vita
11–12 June	Kwita Izina Cycling Tour	Rwanda	2.2	Daniel Teklehaymanot (ERI)	Eritrea (national team)
27 June – 1 July	Tour d'Algérie	Algeria	2.2	Azzedine Lagab (ALG)	Groupement Sportif Petrolier Algérie
2 July	Circuit d'Alger	Algeria	1.2	Azzedine Lagab (ALG)	Groupement Sportif Petrolier Algérie
20–24 July	Tour of Eritrea	Eritrea	2.2	Meron Russom (ERI)	Eritrea (national team)

== Final standings ==
=== Individual classification ===
Rank	Name	Points
1.	Adil Jelloul (MAR)	446
2.	Daniel Teklehaimanot (ERI)	325.67
3.	Azzeddine Lagab (ALG)	248.33
4.	Tarik Chaoufi (MAR)	203
5.	Mouhssine Lahsaini (MAR)	184
6.	Abdelatif Saadoune (MAR)	124
7.	Ferekalsi Debessay (ERI)	120.67
8.	Anthony Charteau (FRA)	112
9.	Johann Rabie (RSA)	109
10.	Natnael Berhane (ERI)	106

=== Team classification ===
Rank	Team	Points
1.	Groupement Sportif Petrolier Algérie	463.66
2.	Team Europcar	197
3.	Team Bonitas	188.34
4.	MTN–Qhubeka	175.67
5.	Rapha Condor-Sharp	150
6.	Amore & Vita	129
7.	FDJ	94
8.	Team NetApp	75
9.	Miche-Guerciotti	70
10.	Dukla Trenčín Merida	58

=== Nation classification ===
Rank	Nation	Points
1.	Morocco	1212
2.	Eritrea	806.68
3.	South Africa	581.67
4.	Algeria	548.99
5.	Burkina Faso	300
6.	Cameroon	202
7.	Namibia	149.67
8.	Angola	140
9.	Lesotho	140
10.	Zimbabwe	140

=== Nation under-23 classification ===
Rank	Nation under-23	Points
1.	South Africa	193.34
2.	Algeria	146
3.	Eritrea	141
4.	Morocco	32
5.	Burkina Faso	30
6.	Ethiopia	27
7.	Morocco	22
8.	Lesotho	21
9.	Tunisia	18
10.	Angola	14
