= 2010 UCI Road World Championships – Men's road race =

Men's Individual Road Race
2010 UCI Road World Championships
- Rainbow jersey

Race details
- Dates: 3 October 2010
- Stages: 1
- Distance: 259.9 km (161.5 mi)
- Winning time: 6h 21' 49"

Medalists
	Gold	Thor Hushovd (Norway)
	Silver	Matti Breschel (Denmark)
	Bronze	Allan Davis (Australia)

The Men's Individual Road Race of the 2010 UCI Road World Championships cycling event took place on 3 October in Melbourne and concluded in Geelong, Australia. Thor Hushovd claimed the World Championship in a sprint finish, to become the first Norwegian to win the World Championship road race.

== Route ==
The race started at Federation Square at Melbourne. For the first time, the World Championship route started and finished in different locations, with the riders traveling to Geelong before entering the finishing circuit. The route followed the West Gate Freeway and Princes Freeway, passing the Werribee River. Exiting at Bulban Road, the riders passed the You Yangs Regional Park, continued via Bacchus Marsh Road, then entered the Geelong circuit at Bell Parade. There were eleven laps around a 15.9 kilometre course through the Geelong suburbs, including South Geelong, Belmont, Highton, Queens Park, Newtown and Geelong West. The profile included two steep climbs, the first between 5 and 7 kilometres, the second between 9 and 11. The finish had a moderate uphill gradient.

Circuit practice, training and racing took place in Geelong from Thursday 23 September to Sunday 3 October.

== Race Report ==
The early breakaway consisted of 5 riders and was given a lead of up to 23 minutes by the peloton. In the break were Oleksandr Kvachuk, Mohammed Said Elammoury, Jackson Rodríguez, Diego Tamayo and Matt Brammeier. In between the break and the peloton rode Esad Hasanovic, who was chasing the lead group for several kilometres. He rode around 5 to 6 minutes behind them for some time. The breakaway almost lapped the peloton on the closing circuits, but the American and Belgian teams would increase the pace of the peloton and the gap began to fall. Elammoury was dropped by the other four with about 10 laps to go.

Kvachuk dropped Brammeier, Tamayo, and Rodriguez but by the end of the seventh lap the gap had fallen to about 5 minutes. Somewhat like the previous year's race, a large escape group went away, this time with 5 laps to go. The group contained 31 riders, including the previous year's champion Cadel Evans, his teammates Stuart O'Grady and Simon Gerrans, Edvald Boasson Hagen of Norway, Belgian Philippe Gilbert, Dane Matti Breschel and 5 Italians including Vincenzo Nibali and Filippo Pozzato. The group survived until lap nine although the peloton, led on by Spain, never let them get much of a gap. On the ninth lap Nibali attacked which decimated the breakaway and the peloton behind. Evans, Gilbert, and Pozzato were chasing behind at the end of the 9th lap, with the peloton 49 seconds behind Nibali. However, the peloton kept the pressure high and had pulled back all the attackers, including the early breakaway at the beginning of the last lap.

On the final ascent of the Montpelier climb, Gilbert made an attack and Evans immediately tried to jump into his slipstream. However, Gilbert got away from Evans, who was absorbed by a chase group containing Paul Martens of Germany, Alexander Kolobnev of Russia, Koos Moerenhout of The Netherlands, and Fränk Schleck of Luxembourg. The group was not well organized and was brought back by the remnants of the peloton and Gilbert was also caught with 2 kilometers to go.

Russian Vladimir Gusev and Slovenian Janez Brajkovič attacked just before the 1 kilometer to go banner and were joined by Dutchman Niki Terpstra. Terpstra attacked with about 800 meters to go as the Danes tried to set up a sprint for Breschel. However, as soon as Terpstra was caught Belgian Greg Van Avermaet launched the sprint. Breschel passed Van Avermaet on the left-hand side but Thor Hushovd of Norway passed Breschel and held on to the finish line for the victory. Breschel would settle for 2nd while Allan Davis of Australia passed Van Avermaet for the bronze medal.

== National qualification ==
Nations in the top ten places of the UCI World Ranking on 15 August were permitted up to nine riders, although they were not permitted more than six unless they had at least seven riders in the rankings on that date. This happened to Kazakhstan, and as a result, one additional spot was awarded to Luxembourg, Slovenia and France (10th to 12 respectively in the rankings), although this concession had not been in the original documentation describing the allocation of places.

27 other qualifying nations were permitted no more than six riders. After allowing for the top ten in the world rankings, the continental rankings are to be used to identify sixteen further European nations, two countries from the UCI Africa Tour, five from the Americas, three Asian countries, and one representative of the Oceania tour.

Riders on teams that are members of a UCI ProTeam, but whose nation did not qualify, were eligible for additional places.

== Nation qualification ==
14 to be enrolled, 9 to start
Spain
Italy
Belgium
Australia
United States
Russia
Switzerland
Germany
Netherlands
9 to be enrolled, 7 to start
France
Slovenia
14 to be enrolled, 6 to start
Kazakhstan
9 to be enrolled, 6 to start
Morocco
Colombia
Venezuela
Iran
Poland
Portugal
Ukraine
Denmark
5 to be enrolled, 4 to start
Luxembourg
5 to be enrolled, 3 to start
South Africa
Canada
Brazil
Argentina
Japan
South Korea
Bulgaria
Croatia
Czech Republic
Lithuania
Estonia
Ireland
Norway
Great Britain
Austria
Serbia
New Zealand
Slovakia
3 to be enrolled, 2 to start
Belarus
Sweden
2 to be enrolled, 1 to start
Uzbekistan
Cuba
Bolivia
Uruguay
Chile
Guatemala
Costa Rica
Latvia
Greece
Romania

== Final classification ==
Rank	Bib Number	Name	Country	Time
1st place, gold medalist(s)	77	Thor Hushovd	Norway	6:21:49
2nd place, silver medalist(s)	144	Matti Breschel	Denmark	s.t.
3rd place, bronze medalist(s)	3	Allan Davis	Australia	s.t.
4	24	Filippo Pozzato	Italy	s.t.
5	35	Greg Van Avermaet	Belgium	s.t.
6	12	Óscar Freire	Spain	s.t.
7	70	Alexander Kolobnev	Russia	s.t.
8	86	Assan Bazayev	Kazakhstan	s.t.
9	127	Yukiya Arashiro	Japan	s.t.
10	100	Romain Feillu	France	s.t.
11	91	Grega Bole	Slovenia	s.t.
12	88	Dmitriy Fofonov	Kazakhstan	s.t.
13	51	Koos Moerenhout	Netherlands	s.t.
14	63	Fabian Wegmann	Germany	s.t.
15	135	André Cardoso	Portugal	s.t.
16	66	Fränk Schleck	Luxembourg	s.t.
17	1	Cadel Evans	Australia	s.t.
18	31	Philippe Gilbert	Belgium	s.t.
19	53	Niki Terpstra	Netherlands	+0:07
20	33	Björn Leukemans	Belgium	s.t.
21	68	Vladimir Gusev	Russia	+0:13
22	93	Janez Brajkovič	Slovenia	s.t.
23	148	Chris Sørensen	Denmark	s.t.
24	145	Anders Lund	Denmark	+0:15
25	60	Paul Martens	Germany	s.t.
26	104	Yoann Offredo	France	+2:07
27	168	Jonas Ljungblad	Sweden	+2:09
28	155	Matija Kvasina	Croatia	+2:11
29	59	Christian Knees	Germany	s.t.
30	128	Fumiyuki Beppu	Japan	s.t.
31	96	Simon Špilak	Slovenia	+2:13
32	101	Cyril Gautier	France	s.t.
33	178	Kanstantsin Sivtsov	Belarus	s.t.
34	111	José Serpa	Colombia	s.t.
35	161	Juan José Haedo	Argentina	s.t.
36	27	Giovanni Visconti	Italy	s.t.
37	19	Marzio Bruseghin	Italy	+5:11
38	23	Luca Paolini	Italy	s.t.
39	18	Haimar Zubeldia	Spain	s.t.
40	21	Vincenzo Nibali	Italy	+7:10
41	46	Lars Boom	Netherlands	+7:22
42	52	Wout Poels	Netherlands	s.t.
43	56	André Greipel	Germany	s.t.
44	97	Gorazd Štangelj	Slovenia	s.t.
45	7	Stuart O'Grady	Australia	s.t.
46	157	Radoslav Rogina	Croatia	s.t.
47	48	Karsten Kroon	Netherlands	s.t.
48	94	Jure Kocjan	Slovenia	s.t.
49	67	Pavel Brutt	Russia	s.t.
50	80	Fabian Cancellara	Switzerland	s.t.
51	177	Yauheni Hutarovich	Belarus	+13:53
52	139	Denys Kostyuk	Ukraine	s.t.
53	174	Martin Velits	Slovakia	s.t.
54	150	Petr Benčik	Czech Republic	s.t.
55	81	Martin Elmiger	Switzerland	s.t.
56	133	Hernani Broco	Portugal	s.t.
57	73	Egor Silin	Russia	s.t.
58	62	Marcel Sieberg	Germany	s.t.
59	83	Steve Morabito	Switzerland	s.t.
60	115	Bartosz Huzarski	Poland	s.t.
61	75	Eduard Vorganov	Russia	s.t.
62	47	Koen de Kort	Netherlands	s.t.
63	99	Sylvain Chavanel	France	s.t.
64	114	Michał Gołaś	Poland	s.t.
65	169	Bernhard Eisel	Austria	s.t.
66	170	Peter Wrolich	Austria	s.t.
67	142	Oleksandr Sheydyk	Ukraine	s.t.
68	165	David McCann	Ireland	s.t.
69	78	Alexander Kristoff	Norway	s.t.
70	103	Sébastien Hinault	France	s.t.
71	55	Bert Grabsch	Germany	s.t.
72	129	Yukihiro Doi	Japan	s.t.
73	38	Ted King	United States	s.t.
74	175	Peter Velits	Slovakia	s.t.
75	167	Gustav Larsson	Sweden	s.t.
76	143	Lars Bak	Denmark	s.t.
77	152	Julian Dean	New Zealand	s.t.
78	117	Przemysław Niemiec	Poland	s.t.
79	44	Christian Vande Velde	United States	s.t.
80	41	Danny Pate	United States	s.t.
81	37	Tyler Farrar	United States	s.t.
82	57	Danilo Hondo	Germany	s.t.
83	102	Anthony Geslin	France	s.t.
84	159	Tanel Kangert	Estonia	s.t.
85	107	Svein Tuft	Canada	s.t.
86	98	William Bonnet	France	s.t.
87	151	Leopold König	Czech Republic	s.t.
88	87	Alexsandr Dyachenko	Kazakhstan	s.t.
89	149	Ignatas Konovalovas	Lithuania	s.t.
90	137	José João Mendes	Portugal	s.t.
91	49	Steven Kruijswijk	Netherlands	s.t.
92	50	Sebastian Langeveld	Netherlands	s.t.
93	140	Oleksandr Kvachuk	Ukraine	s.t.
94	6	Mathew Hayman	Australia	s.t.
95	9	Wesley Sulzberger	Australia	s.t.
96	8	Michael Rogers	Australia	s.t.
97	166	Nicolas Roche	Ireland	s.t.
98	64	Laurent Didier	Luxembourg	+21:51
99	171	Zsolt Dér	Serbia	+22:50

=== Riders who did not finish ===
79 riders failed to finish the race.

Rider	Country
Lucas Sebastián Haedo	Argentina
Matías Médici	Argentina
Baden Cooke	Australia
Matthew Goss	Australia
Simon Gerrans	Australia
Frederik Willems	Belgium
Jan Bakelants	Belgium
Jürgen Roelandts	Belgium
Kevin De Weert	Belgium
Leif Hoste	Belgium
Mario Aerts	Belgium
Murilo Fischer	Brazil
Christian Meier	Canada
Dominique Rollin	Canada
Carlos Oyarzún	Chile
Diego Alejandro Tamayo	Colombia
Hrvoje Miholjević	Croatia
Alex Rasmussen	Denmark
Michael Mørkøv	Denmark
Kalle Kriit	Estonia
Dominic Klemme	Germany
Tony Martin	Germany
David Millar	Great Britain
Jeremy Hunt	Great Britain
Mark Cavendish	Great Britain
Matthew Brammeier	Ireland

Rider	Country
Andrea Tonti	Italy
Daniel Oss	Italy
Francesco Gavazzi	Italy
Matteo Tosatto	Italy
Sergey Renev	Kazakhstan
Valentin Iglinskiy	Kazakhstan
Ben Gastauer	Luxembourg
Abdelati Saadoune	Morocco
Adil Jelloul	Morocco
Adnane Aarbia	Morocco
Mohamed Elammoury	Morocco
Mouhssine Lahsaini	Morocco
Tarik Chaoufi	Morocco
Jos van Emden	Netherlands
Gregory Henderson	New Zealand
Hayden Roulston	New Zealand
Edvald Boasson Hagen	Norway
Jarosław Marycz	Poland
Maciej Bodnar	Poland
Marcin Sapa	Poland
Manuel Antonio Cardoso	Portugal
Samuel Caldeira	Portugal
Alexander Porsev	Russia
Artem Ovechkin	Russia
Vladimir Karpets	Russia
Yury Trofimov	Russia
Esad Hasanovic	Serbia

Rider	Country
Peter Sagan	Slovakia
Borut Božič	Slovenia
Kristjan Koren	Slovenia
Darren Lill	South Africa
Daryl Impey	South Africa
Jay Robert Thomson	South Africa
Carlos Barredo	Spain
Francisco Ventoso	Spain
Imanol Erviti	Spain
Juan Manuel Gárate	Spain
Luis León Sánchez	Spain
Rubén Plaza	Spain
Samuel Sánchez	Spain
Danilo Wyss	Switzerland
Grégory Rast	Switzerland
Martin Kohler	Switzerland
Michael Albasini	Switzerland
Andriy Hrivko	Ukraine
Yuriy Metlushenko	Ukraine
Craig Lewis	United States
David Zabriskie	United States
Jason McCartney	United States
Tejay van Garderen	United States
Thomas Peterson	United States
Carlos José Ochoa	Venezuela
Jackson Rodríguez	Venezuela
