= Lahcen Saber =

Moroccan cyclist

Personal information
- Full name: Lahcen Saber
- Born: 1 January 1990 (age 36)

Cycling career
- Sport: Cycling
- Current team: Velo Vert Casablanca
- Discipline: Road
- Role: Rider

Amateur teams
- 2018: Club Omnisports Meknes
- 2020–: Velo Vert Casablanca

Lahcen Saber (born 1 January 1990) is a Moroccan cyclist.

== Major results ==
2010
8th GP Oued Eddahab, Les Challenges de la Marche Verte
2011
2nd Under-23 time trial, National Road Championships
9th Trophée de la Maison Royale, Challenge du Prince
9th Grand Prix Khouribga, Challenge des phosphates
2013
7th Overall Tour de Tipaza
Les Challenges de la Marche Verte

7th GP Oued Eddahab
8th GP Sakia El Hamra

8th Trophée de la Maison Royale, Challenge du Prince
2014
10th Overall Tour of Rwanda
10th Overall Tour du Maroc
2015
1st Stage 6 (TTT) La Tropicale Amissa Bongo
Challenge des phosphates

1st Grand Prix de Ben Guerir
2nd Grand Prix Fkih Ben Saleh

National Road Championships

5th Road race
6th Time trial

Challenge du Prince

5th Trophée de l'Anniversaire
6th Trophée de la Maison Royale
9th Trophée Princier

Les Challenges de la Marche Verte

5th GP Oued Eddahab
6th GP Sakia El Hamra

8th Overall Sharjah International Cycling Tour
9th Overall Tour du Faso
2016
3rd Team time trial, African Road Championships
6th Time trial, National Road Championships
2017
7th Overall Tour du Cameroun
2022
3rd Trophée Princier, Challenge du Prince
4th Road race, National Road Championships
2023
1st Stage 3 Tour du Sahel
