= Adnane Aarbia =

Moroccan cyclist (born 1983)

Personal information
- Born: 14 July 1983 (age 43) Marrakesh, Morocco

Cycling career
- Sport: Cycling
- Current team: Retired
- Discipline: Road
- Role: Rider

Adnane Aarbia (born 14 July 1983) is a Moroccan former road cyclist. He competed in the road race at the 2010 and 2011 UCI Road World Championships, but did not finish either year.

== Major results ==
2007
6th Grand Prix of Sharm el-Sheikh
2008
4th Road race, National Road Championships
2009
5th Road race, National Road Championships
2010
6th Overall Tour of Libya
6th GP Oued Eddahab, Les Challenges de la Marche Verte
8th Trophée Princier, Challenge du Prince
9th Grand Prix of Al Fatah
2012
3rd Road race, National Road Championships
Challenge des phosphates

5th Challenge Ben Guerir
7th Challenge Khouribga
8th Challenge Youssoufia

10th Trophée Princier, Challenge du Prince
2013
5th Road race, National Road Championships
2014
Challenge du Prince

3rd Trophée Princier
7th Trophée de l'Anniversaire

3rd GP Sakia El Hamra, Les Challenges de la Marche Verte
5th Road race, National Road Championships
2015
4th GP Oued Eddahab, Les Challenges de la Marche Verte
2016
7th Trophée Princier, Challenge du Prince
