= Mounir Makhchoun =

Moroccan cyclist

Personal information
- Full name: Mounir Makhchoun
- Born: 7 September 1994 (age 32)

Cycling career
- Sport: Cycling
- Discipline: Road
- Role: Rider

Amateur team
- 2015–2016: Maroc Régional Centre

Professional team
- 2017–2018: VIB Bikes

Mounir Makhchoun (born 7 September 1994) is a Moroccan cyclist, who last rode for UCI Continental team VIB Sports.

== Major results ==
2014
9th Trophée de la Maison Royale, Challenge du Prince
2015
Challenge du Prince

5th Trophée Princier
10th Trophée de la Maison Royale

7th Grand prix de Khouribga, Challenge des phosphates
2016
1st Overall Tour d'Egypte

1st Young rider classification

1st Stage 4 Tour du Cameroun
2nd Trophée de l'Anniversaire, Challenge du Prince
2017
2nd GP Al Massira, Les Challenges de la Marche Verte
Challenge du Prince

8th Trophée de la Maison Royale
9th Trophée Princier

2018
2nd Overall Grand Prix International de la ville d'Alger
2022
1st Stage 5 Tour du Cameroun
