= Soufiane Haddi =

Moroccan racing cyclist

Personal information
- Full name: Soufiane Haddi
- Born: 2 February 1991 (age 35) Khenifra, Morocco
- Height: 1.70 m (5 ft 7 in)
- Weight: 63 kg (139 lb)

Cycling career
- Sport: Cycling
- Current team: Abu Dhabi Cycling Club
- Discipline: Road
- Role: Rider

Amateur team
- 2022–: Abu Dhabi Cycling Club

Professional teams
- 2014–2016: Skydive Dubai Pro Cycling
- 2018: Vito–Feirense–BlackJack
- 2019: VIB Sports

Major wins
- One day races National Time Trial Championships (2013–2016); National Road Race Championships (2015)

Soufiane Haddi (born 2 February 1991) is a Moroccan road bicycle racer, who rides for Emirati amateur team Abu Dhabi Cycling Club. He competed at the 2012 and 2016 Summer Olympics in the Men's road race, but failed to finish either event.

== Major results ==
2010
8th Grand Prix of Al Fatah
2011
9th Overall Kwita Izina Cycling Tour
2012
2nd Challenge Khouribga, Challenge des phosphates
Les Challenges de la Marche Verte

3rd GP Oued Eddahab
4th GP Sakia El Hamra
5th GP Al Massira

4th Overall Tour du Maroc

1st Young rider classification

6th Trophée de l'Anniversaire, Challenge du Prince
10th Overall Course de la Solidarité Olympique

1st Young rider classification

2013
1st Time trial, National Road Championships
1st Stage 10 Tour du Maroc
2nd Overall La Tropicale Amissa Bongo

1st Young rider classification
1st Sprints classification

3rd Trophée de la Maison Royale, Challenge du Prince
Mediterranean Games

8th Road race
10th Time trial

2014
1st Time trial, National Road Championships
1st Stage 8 Tour de Singkarak
3rd Overall Sharjah International Cycling Tour

1st Mountains classification
1st Stage 2

7th Overall Jelajah Malaysia
2015
National Road Championships

1st Road race
1st Time trial

1st Overall Sharjah International Cycling Tour

1st Stages 1, 2 & 3

2nd Overall Tour d'Egypte

1st Stage 3

4th Overall Tour du Maroc

1st Sprints classification
1st Stage 6

5th Overall Jelajah Malaysia

1st Stage 2 (TTT)

2016
National Road Championships

1st Time trial
3rd Road race

1st Stage 1 (TTT) Sharjah International Cycling Tour
African Road Championships

4th Road race
4th Time trial

4th Overall Tour de Côte d'Ivoire

1st Stage 2

9th Overall La Tropicale Amissa Bongo
10th Overall Dubai Tour

1st Young rider classification

2017
4th Time trial, National Road Championships
2019
10th Overall Tour of Mersin
