= Cycling at the 2014 African Youth Games =

Cycling at the 2014 African Youth Games took place from 22 to 27 May 2014 in Kgale Hill (MTB) & Road of Gaborone, Gaborone, Botswana. There were 8 events contested in this sport.

== Medal summary ==
=== Women Junior Team Time Trial ===
Distance	Gold		Silver		Bronze	
20.8 Kilometres	Michelle Benson (RSA); Frances Du Toit (RSA); Catherine Colyn (RSA)	00:30:27.7	Ebtissam Zayed (EGY); Menatalla Essam (EGY); Toka Khaled (EGY)	00:33:20.0	Mercy Ajoka (NGA); Sylvia Odom (NGA)	00:30:27.7

=== Men Junior Team Time Trial ===
Distance	Gold		Silver		Bronze	
31.2 Kilometres	Ivan Venter (RSA); Stefan De Bod (RSA); Carl Bonthuys (RSA); Graeme Ockhuys (RSA)	00:39:21.3	Adberrahim Zahiri (MAR); El Mehdi Chokri (MAR); El Mendi Laanaya (MAR); Mohcine Elkouraji (MAR)	00:40:02.3	Zoheir Benyoub (ALG); Mohamed Amine Belabessi (ALG); Hichem Moktori (ALG); Salim Keddah (ALG)	00:40:53.8

=== Women Junior Individual Time Trial ===
Distance	Gold		Silver		Bronze	
10.4 Kilometres	Michelle Benson (RSA)	00:15:18.65	Ebtissam Zayed (EGY)	00:15:22.80	Sylvia Odom (NGA)	00:16:07.15

=== Men Junior Individual Time Trial ===
Distance	Gold		Silver		Bronze	
20.8 Kilometres	Stefan De Bod (RSA)	00:26:51.99	Ivan Venter (RSA)	00:27:07.94	Salim Keddah (ALG)	00:27:34.43

=== Women Junior Road Race ===
Distance	Gold		Silver		Bronze	
52 Kilometres	Ebtissam Zayed (EGY)	01:28:57	Michelle Benson (RSA)	01:28:57	Menatalla Essam (EGY)	01:28:57

=== Men Junior Road Race ===
Distance	Gold		Silver		Bronze	
104 Kilometres	Abderrahim Zahiri (MAR)	02:32:06	Zoheir Benyoub (ALG)	02:32:07	Graeme Ockhuys (RSA)	02:35:45

=== Women Junior Cross Country Olympic ===
Distance	Gold		Silver		Bronze	
Kilometres	Frances Du Toit (RSA)	01:28:57	(KEN)	—	(KEN)	—

=== Men Junior Cross Country Olympic ===
Distance	Gold		Silver		Bronze	
Kilometres	Alan Hatherly (RSA)	—	Tristan De Lange (NAM)	—	(NAM)	—

=== Medal table ===
Rank	Nation	Gold	Silver	Bronze	Total
1	South Africa (RSA)	5	2	0	7
2	Egypt (EGY)	1	2	1	4
3	Morocco (MAR)	1	1	0	2
4	Algeria (ALG)	0	1	2	3
5	Kenya (KEN)	0	1	1	2
5	Namibia (NAM)	0	1	1	2
7	Nigeria (NGA)	0	0	2	2
Totals (7 entries)		7	8	7	22
