= Abderrahim Zahiri =

Moroccan cyclist

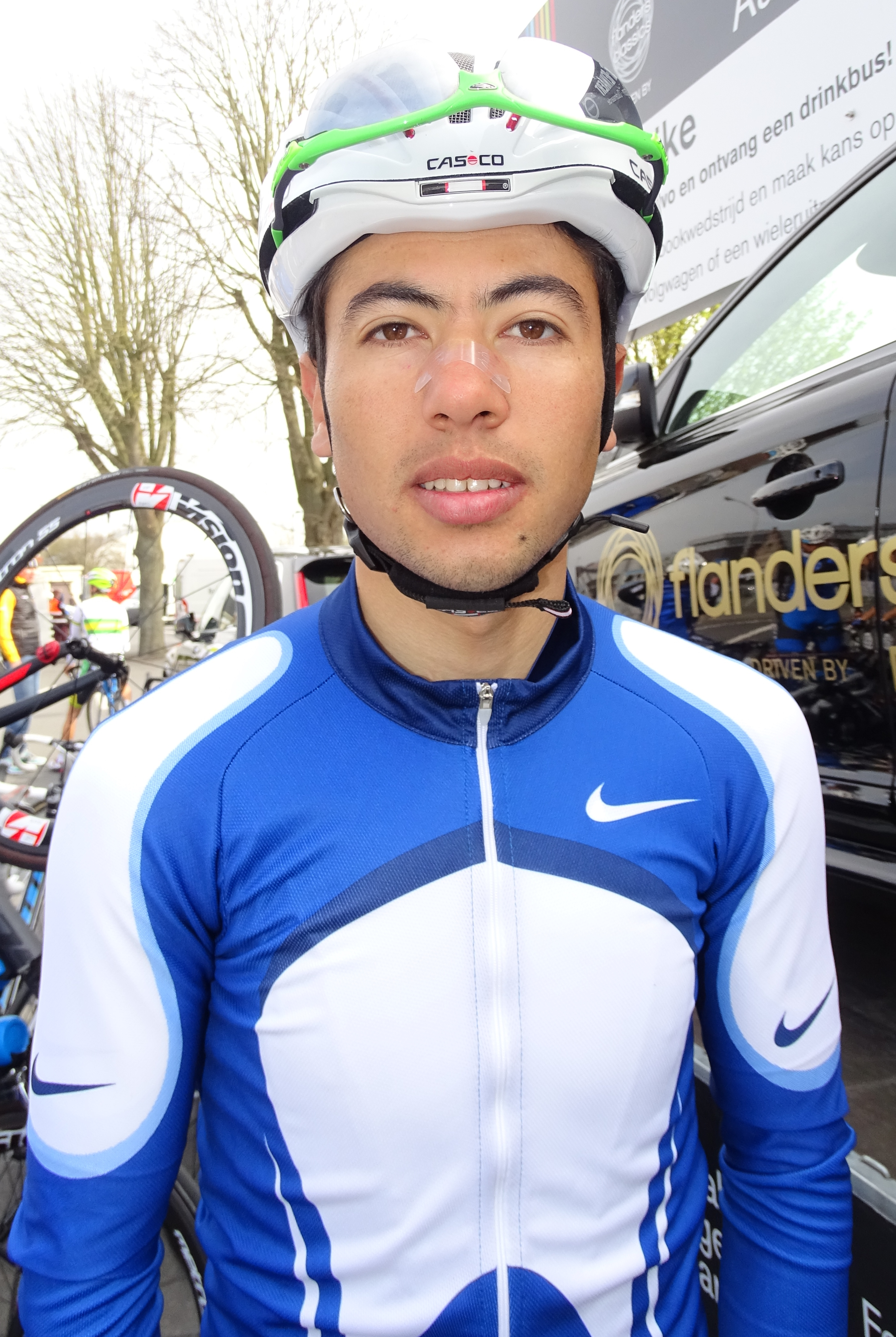
- Zahiri in 2016

Personal information
- Full name: Abderrahim Zahiri
- Born: 1 January 1996 (age 30) M'rirt, Morocco

Cycling career
- Sport: Cycling
- Discipline: Road
- Role: Rider

Amateur teams
- 2015: Cycling Club Fès
- 2016: World Cycling Centre
- 2019: Bourg-en-Bresse Ain

Professional teams
- 2017–2018: Unieuro Trevigiani–Hemus 1896
- 2020–2021: General Store–Essegibi–Fratelli Curia

Abderrahim Zahiri (born 1 January 1996 in M'rirt) is a Moroccan cyclist, who most recently rode for UCI Continental team General Store–Fratelli Curia–Essegibi.

== Major results ==
2013
African Junior Road Championships

1st Road race
2nd Time trial

National Junior Road Championships

1st Road race
1st Time trial

2014
1st Road race, African Youth Games
2015
3rd Time trial, National Under-23 Road Championships
4th GP Ben Guerir, Challenge des phosphates
7th Overall Tour d'Egypte
2016
3rd Individual pursuit, African Track Championships
9th Overall Tour de Côte d'Ivoire

1st Stages 1 & 6

2017
National Under-23 Road Championships

1st Road race
2nd Time trial

5th Overall Toscana-Terra di Ciclismo
9th Overall Tour of Ankara
10th GP Al Massira, Les Challenges de la Marche Verte
2018
1st Stage 1 Toscana-Terra di Ciclismo
2nd Trofeo Edil C
3rd Giro del Medio Brenta
10th Overall Tour of Mersin
10th Overall Tour of Estonia
10th Overall Ronde de l'Isard
2019
Les Challenges de la Marche Verte

4th GP Sakia El Hamra
8th GP Oued Eddahab

6th Overall Tour du Cameroun

1st Young rider classification

6th Overall Tour du Maroc
