= Moroccan National Road Championships =

National road cycling championships in Morocco

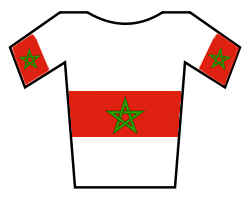

Race details
- Date: June
- Discipline: Road
- Type: One-day race

History
- First edition: 2002

The Moroccan National Road Championships are held annually to decide the cycling champions in both the road race and time trial discipline, across various categories.

== Men ==
=== Road race ===
| Year | Winner | Second | Third |
|---|---|---|---|
| 2002 | Adil Jelloul | Laurence MacLean |
| 2005 | Abdelati Saadoune |
| 2006 | Abdelati Saadoune | Adil Jelloul | Brahim Misbah |
| 2007 | Adil Jelloul | Abdelati Saadoune | Mouhssine Lahsaini |
| 2008 | Adil Jelloul | Driss Hnini | Mohammed Said El Ammoury |
| 2009 | Adil Jelloul | Abdelati Saadoune | Mouhssine Lahsaini |
| 2010 | Mohammed Said El Ammoury | Abdelati Saadoune | Tarik Chaoufi |
| 2011 | Adil Jelloul | Essaïd Abelouache | Abdelati Saadoune |
| 2012 | Tarik Chaoufi | Abdelati Saadoune | Adnane Aarbia |
| 2013 | Abdelati Saadoune | Reda Aadel | Adil Jelloul |
| 2014 | Adil Jelloul | Salaheddine Mraouni | Tarik Chaoufi |
| 2015 | Soufiane Haddi | Essaïd Abelouache | Mouhssine Lahsaini |
| 2016 | Anass Aït El Abdia | Mouhssine Lahsaini | Soufiane Haddi |
| 2017 | Essaïd Abelouache | Abdeladim El Moutaouakke | Mohamed Nizar Essail |
| 2018 | Abdessadek Kouna | Abdelillah Essabany | Mohamed Zarhoun |
| 2019 | Adil El Arbaoui | Oussama Khafi | Houcaine Sabbahi |
| 2020–2021 | No race |
| 2022 | Achraf Ed Doghmy | Anass Aït El Abdia | Mohcine El Kouraji |
| 2023 | Achraf Ed Doghmy | Adil El Arbaoui | Mohcine El Kouraji |
| 2024 | El Houçaine Sabbahi | Oussama Khafi | Ibrahim Essabahy |
| 2025 | Adil El Arbaoui | Anass Aït El Abdia | Driss El Alouani |
| 2026 | Anass Aït El Abdia | Achraf Ed Doghmy | Ahmed Echahed |

==== Under-23 ====
| Year | Winner | Second | Third |
|---|---|---|---|
| 2014 | Salaheddine Mraouni | Mounir Makhchoun | Hatim Bouchane |
| 2015 | Zouhair Rahil | Anass Aït El Abdia | Soufiane Sahbaoui |
| 2016 | Soufiane Sahbaoui | Mohcine El Kouraji | El Houcaine Sabbahi |
| 2017 | Abderrahim Zahiri | El Mehdi Chokri | Mohsin Annachnach |

=== Time trial ===
| Year | Winner | Second | Third |
|---|---|---|---|
| 2003 | Abdelati Saadoune |
| 2004 | Abdelati Saadoune |
| 2010 | Mouhssine Lahsaini | Abdelati Saadoune | Mouhcine Rhaili |
| 2011 | Mouhssine Lahsaini | Abdelati Saadoune | Ismaïl Ayoune |
| 2012 | Mouhssine Lahsaini | Adil Jelloul | Abdelati Saadoune |
| 2013 | Soufiane Haddi | Othmane El Afi | Ismaïl Ayoune |
| 2014 | Soufiane Haddi | Mouhssine Lahsaini | Mohamed Er Rafai |
| 2015 | Soufiane Haddi | Mouhssine Lahsaini | Anass Aït El Abdia |
| 2016 | Soufiane Haddi | Mouhssine Lahsaini | Mohcine El Kouraji |
| 2017 | Mouhssine Lahsaini | Abdessadek Kouna | Hicham Benouzza |
| 2018 | Abdessadek Kouna | Omar Adim | Abdelhouahed Farssi |
| 2019 | El Mehdi Chokri | Mohcine Al Kouraji | Abdessadek Kouna |
| 2020–2021 | No race |
| 2022 | Mohcine El Kouraji | Adil El Arbaoui | Achraf Ed Doghmy |
| 2023 | Adil El Arbaoui | Achraf Ed Doghmy | Mohcine El Kouraji |
| 2024 | Adil El Arbaoui | Mohcine El Kouraji | Oussama Khafi |
| 2025 | Mohcine El Kouraji | Adil El Arbaoui | Achraf Ed Doghmy |
| 2026 | Mohcine El Kouraji | Achraf Ed Doghmy | Zouhair Rahil |

==== Under-23 ====
| Year | Winner | Second | Third |
|---|---|---|---|
| 2014 | Othmane Choumouch | Salah Eddine Lamkhidda | Abderrahim Aouida |
| 2015 | Anass Aït El Abdia | Alae Boukhriss | Abderrahim Zahiri |
| 2016 | Mohcine El Kouraji | Haitam Gaiz | Ilyass Rabihi |
| 2017 | El Mehdi Chokri | Abderrahim Zahiri | Mohsin Annachnach |
| 2018 | Othman Harakat | Ayoub El Aroussi | Hichame Akkaoui |
| 2019 | El Mehdi Chokri | Mohcine El Kouraji | Oussama Khafi |
| 2022 | Anouar Rahmou | Nasser Eddine Maatougui | Hamza Bougrine |
| 2023 | Nasser Eddine Maatougui | Ibrahim Essabahy | Mohamed Najib Sanbouli |
| 2024 | Ibrahim Essabahy | Driss El Alouani | Younes Hakim |
| 2025 | Driss El Alouani | Marwane Daoudi | Youssef Farid |
| 2026 | Saad Ait Akbour | Marouane Kharbouchi | Youssef Farid |

== Women ==
| Year | Road Race | Time Trial |
| 2011 | Ibtissam Buhati | |
| 2012 | Asmaa Namli | |
| 2013 | Asmaa Zerfaoui | |
| 2014 | Fatima Zahra El Hiyani | |
| 2015 | Nadia Skoukdi | Mounia Benaji |
| 2016 | Nadia Skoukdi | Nadia Skoukdi |
| 2017 | Nadia Skoukdi | Nadia Skoukdi |
| 2018 | Fatima Zahra El Hiyani | Fatima Zahra El Hiyani |
| 2019 | Fatima Zahra El Hiyani | Sahim Es-Sad |
| 2020–2021 | No race | |
| 2022 | Siham Es Sad | Nora Sahmoud |
| 2023 | | |
| 2024 | Mallika Benallal | Mallika Benallal |
| 2025 | Mallika Benallal | Mallika Benallal |
