= Soufiane Sahbaoui =

Moroccan cyclist

Personal information
- Full name: Soufiane Sahbaoui
- Born: 14 August 1995 (age 31)

Cycling career
- Sport: Cycling
- Discipline: Road
- Role: Rider

Amateur team
- 2015: Union Sportive Casablancaise

Professional team
- 2017–2018: VIB Bikes

Soufiane Sahbaoui (born 14 August 1995) is a Moroccan cyclist.

== Major results ==
2013
3rd Time trial, National Junior Road Championships
2015
1st Stage 2 Tour d'Egypte
3rd Road race, National Under-23 Road Championships
5th Grand prix de Ben Guerir, Challenge des phosphates
2016
Challenge du Prince

1st Trophée de l'Anniversaire
6th Trophée Princier

7th Overall Tour de Tunisie
9th Overall Grand Prix Chantal Biya

1st Stage 3

2017
2nd Road race, Jeux de la Francophonie
Challenge du Prince

3rd Trophée de la Maison Royale
10th Trophée Princier

Les Challenges de la Marche Verte

4th GP Sakia El Hamra
7th GP Al Massira

5th Overall La Tropicale Amissa Bongo

1st Young rider classification

6th Overall Tour du Maroc
9th Time trial, African Road Championships
