= El Mehdi Chokri =

Moroccan cyclist

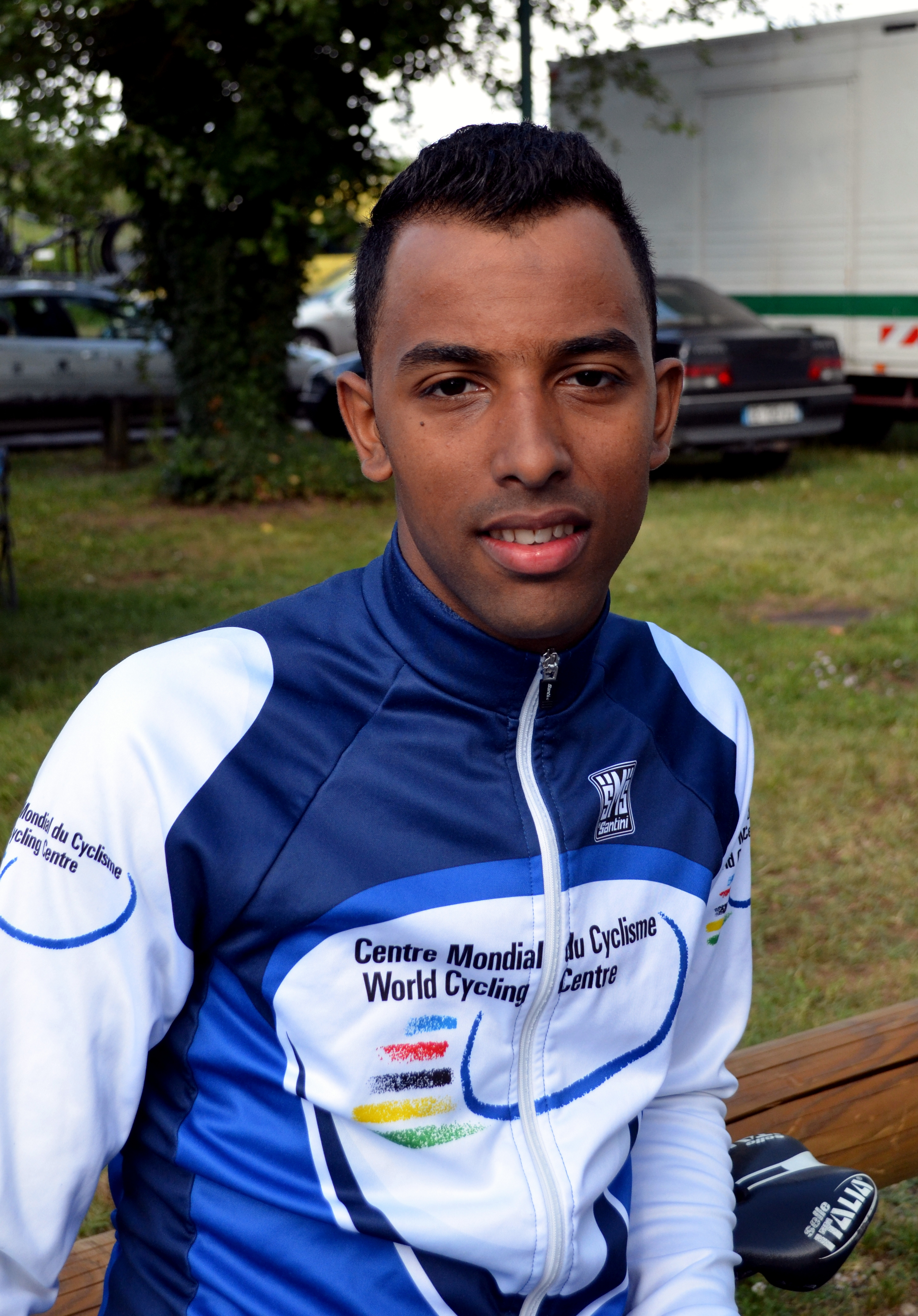
- Chokri in 2016

Personal information
- Full name: El Mehdi Chokri
- Born: 23 January 1997 (age 29)

Cycling career
- Sport: Cycling
- Current team: AJ Amer C
- Discipline: Road
- Role: Rider

Amateur teams
- 2016: World Cycling Centre
- 2020: AC Bisontine
- 2023–: AJ Amer C

Professional teams
- 2017–2019: Dimension Data for Qhubeka
- 2020: Israel Cycling Academy

El Mehdi Chokri (born 23 January 1997) is a Moroccan cyclist, who currently rides for Moroccan amateur team AJ Amer C.

== Major results ==
2014
2nd Time trial, Arab Junior Road Championships
2015
African Junior Road Championships

1st Road race
2nd Team time trial
3rd Individual time trial

Arab Junior Road Championships

1st Time trial
1st Team time trial

1st Time trial, National Junior Road Championships
2016
1st Team pursuit, African Track Championships (with Abderrahim Aouida, Soufiane Sahbaoui and Mohcine El Kouraji)
2nd Overall Tour de Côte d'Ivoire

1st Stage 4

2017
National Under-23 Road Championships

1st Time trial
2nd Road race

2018
2nd Overall Tour de l'Espoir
2019
1st Time trial, National Road Championships
1st Time trial, National Under-23 Road Championships
2nd Gran Premio Industrie del Marmo
7th Overall Tour du Maroc

1st Young rider classification
1st Stage 6
