= Salah Eddine Mraouni =

Moroccan cyclist

Personal information
- Born: December 28, 1992 (age 33) Fez, Morocco

Cycling career
- Sport: Cycling
- Discipline: Road
- Role: Rider

Amateur team
- 2015–2016: World Cycling Centre

Professional team
- 2017: Kuwait–Cartucho.es

Salah Eddine Mraouni (born December 28, 1992) is a Moroccan cyclist.

== Major results ==
2012
Challenge du Prince

5th Trophée de l'Anniversaire
10th Trophée de la Maison Royale

Les Challenges de la Marche Verte

6th GP Oued Eddahab
9th GP Al Massira

2013
Les Challenges de la Marche Verte

6th GP Oued Eddahab
9th GP Al Sakia El Hamra

2014
1st Road race, National Under-23 Road Championships
2nd Road race, National Road Championships
Challenge du Prince

2nd Trophée de la Maison Royale
4th Trophée de l'Anniversaire
5th Trophée Princier

3rd Time trial, Arab Cycling Championships
3rd Critérium International de Sétif
5th Overall Grand Prix Chantal Biya

1st Points classification
1st Mountains classification
1st Stage 2

5th Overall Tour of Rwanda

1st Stages 4 & 7

6th Overall Tour International de Sétif
7th Overall Tour du Maroc

1st Young rider classification

8th Critérium International d'Alger
10th Overall La Tropicale Amissa Bongo
2015
1st Overall UCI Africa Tour
Les Challenges de la Marche Verte

1st GP Sakia El Hamra
2nd GP Oued Eddahab
2nd GP Al Massira

Challenge du Prince

1st Trophée Princier
2nd Trophée de l'Anniversaire
4th Trophée de la Maison Royale

2nd Circuit d'Alger
Challenge des phosphates

2nd GP de Khouribga
4th GP Fkih Ben Saleh
7th GP Ben Guerir

7th Overall Tour d'Egypte

1st Sprints classification

8th Overall La Tropicale Amissa Bongo

1st Stage 6 (TTT)

2016
1st Stage 1 Tour du Maroc
African Road Championships

3rd Team time trial
10th Road race

5th Overall Tour du Cameroun

1st Mountains classification

5th Overall Tour de Côte d'Ivoire
2017
1st Overall Tour du Faso
1st Stage 6 Tour du Maroc
2nd Overall Tour du Cameroun

1st Points classification
1st Stages 4 & 8

3rd Overall Tour of Xingtai
3rd GP Al Massira, Les Challenges de la Marche Verte
4th Overall La Tropicale Amissa Bongo
6th Trophée Princier, Challenge du Prince
2018
9th Overall La Tropicale Amissa Bongo
