= Achraf Ed Doghmy =

Moroccan cyclist (born 1999)

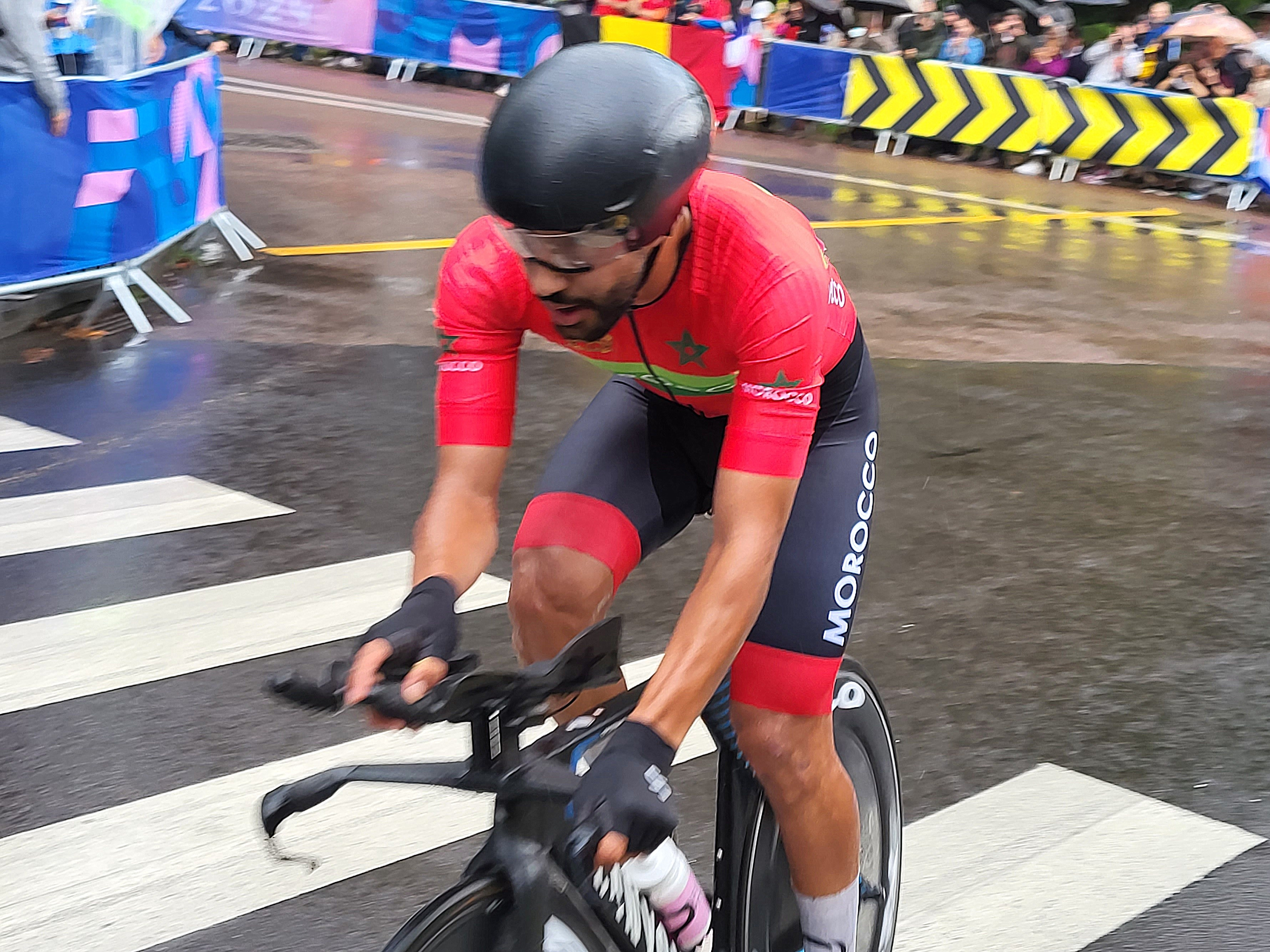
- Ed Doghmy at the 2024 Olympics

Personal information
- Born: 19 November 1999 (age 26) Guelmim, Morocco

Cycling career
- Sport: Cycling
- Current team: N-LAB Mentech
- Discipline: Road
- Role: Rider

Amateur teams
- 2018–2025: Kawkab AC Marrakech
- 2026: Qatar Pro Team
- 2026–: N-LAB Mentech

Achraf Ed Doghmy (born 11 November 1999) is a Moroccan cyclist, who currently rides for club team N-LAB Mentech.

== Major results ==
2019
5th Fatih Sultan Mehmet Edirne Race
6th Fatih Sultan Mehmet Kirklareli Race
6th Trophée de la Maison Royale, Challenge du Prince
9th Overall Konya Tour of Mevlana
2022 (1 pro win)
National Road Championships

1st Road race
3rd Time trial

Challenge du Prince

1st Trophée Princier
3rd Trophée de l'Anniversaire
4th Trophée de la Maison Royale

4th Road race, Islamic Solidarity Games
6th Road race, African Road Championships
6th Overall Tour du Cameroun
6th Overall Tour du Bénin
Les Challenges de la Marche Verte

7th Grand Prix Oued Eddahab
8th Grand Prix Sakia El Hamra

8th Road race, Arab Road Championships
8th Grand Prix Yahyalı
2023 (1)
National Road Championships

1st Road race
2nd Time trial

1st Overall Tour du Bénin

1st Points classification
1st Stage 1

1st Road race, Jeux de la Francophonie
1st Stage 8 Tour du Cameroun
1st Stage 1 Grand Prix Chantal Biya
Arab Games

1st Team time trial
5th Road race

2nd Overall Tour du Sahel

1st Stage 5

2nd Grand Prix Boukraa
2nd Grand Prix El Marsa
3rd Road race, African Road Championships
3rd Grand Prix du Trône
4th Grand Prix Es-Semara
6th Grand Prix de la Famille Royale
2024
1st Overall Tour du Bénin

1st Stage 5

4th Time trial, National Road Championships
7th Overall Tour du Maroc
2025
1st Stage 9 Tour du Faso
National Road Championships

3rd Time trial
5th Road race

8th Time trial, African Road Championships
2026
National Road Championships

2nd Road race
2nd Time trial
