= Anass Aït El Abdia =

Moroccan bicycle racer

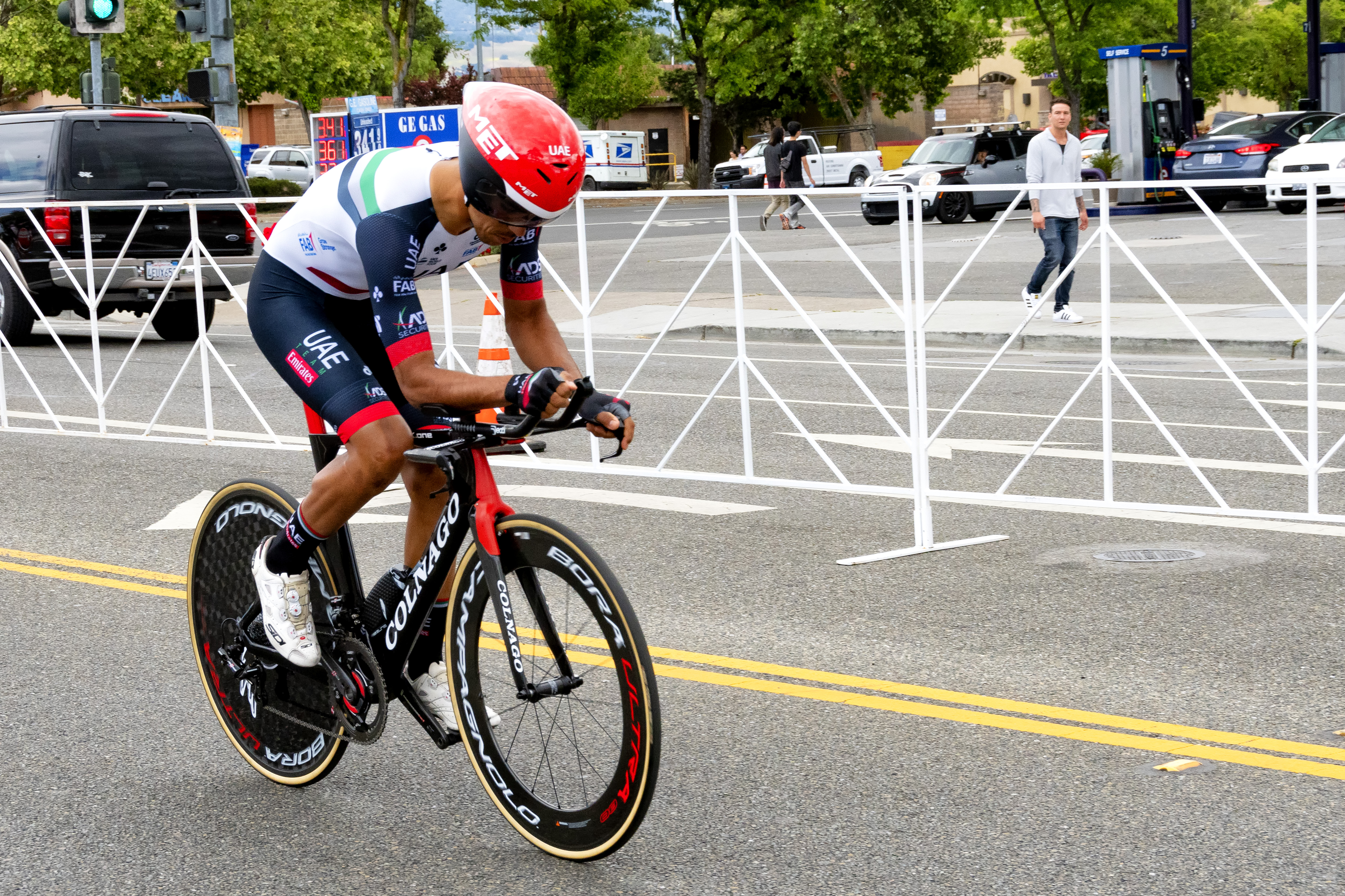
- Aït El Abdia at the 2018 Tour of California

Personal information
- Born: 21 March 1993 (age 33) Casablanca, Morocco
- Height: 1.80 m (5 ft 11 in)
- Weight: 66 kg (146 lb)

Cycling career
- Sport: Cycling
- Current team: Al Shafar Jumeirah Cycling Team
- Discipline: Road
- Role: Rider

Amateur teams
- 2014–2016: World Cycling Centre
- 2022–: Al Shafar Jumeirah Cycling Team

Professional teams
- 2017–2018: UAE Abu Dhabi
- 2019–2021: VIB Sports

Major wins
- Single-day races and Classics National Road Race Championships (2016)

Anass Aït El Abdia (born 21 March 1993) is a Moroccan cyclist, who rides for Emirati amateur team Al Shafar Jumeirah Cycling Team. He previously rode for UCI WorldTeam UAE Team Emirates from 2017 until 2018. He was named in the startlist for the 2017 Vuelta a España, but he crashed out on stage 2.

== Major results ==
2012
Challenge du Prince

4th Trophée de la Maison Royale
8th Trophée Princier

8th Challenge Ben Guerir, Challenge des phosphates
10th Grand Prix Al Massira, Les Challenges de la Marche Verte
2013
1st Young rider classification Tour d'Algérie
Les Challenges de la Marche Verte

2nd Grand Prix Al Massira
3rd Grand Prix Sakia El Hamra

Challenge du Prince

4th Trophée Princier
5th Trophée de l'Anniversaire

5th Grand Prix Oued Eddahab, Les Challenges de la Marche Verte
2014
4th Overall Tour de Constantine

1st Young rider classification

Challenge du Prince

4th Trophée Princier
5th Trophée de l'Anniversaire

9th Overall Tour du Maroc

1st Stage 5

9th Critérium International de Sétif
2015
National Road Championships

1st Under-23 time trial
3rd Time trial

Challenge du Prince

1st Trophée de la Maison Royale
3rd Trophée Princier
3rd Trophée de l'Anniversaire

3rd Overall Tour du Maroc

1st Young rider classification

Les Challenges de la Marche Verte

3rd Grand Prix Oued Eddahab
3rd Grand Prix Al Massira
4th Grand Prix Sakia El Hamra

Challenge des phosphates

3rd Grand Prix de Khouribga
8th Grand Prix Fkih Ben Saleh
8th Grand Prix de Ben Guerir

9th Overall Tour d'Egypte

1st Young rider classification

9th Overall Grand Prix Chantal Biya
2016
1st Road race, National Road Championships
6th Overall Tour de Côte d'Ivoire
2017
1st Overall Tour du Maroc
2019
2nd Overall Tour of Mesopotamia
4th Overall Tour of Mersin
10th Prueba Villafranca de Ordizia
2021
10th Germenica Grand Prix
2022
Tour of Sharjah

1st Mountains classification
1st Stage 2

2nd Road race, National Road Championships
7th Grand Prix Yahyalı
8th Overall Tour du Cameroun

1st Points classification
1st Mountains classification

8th Road race, Mediterranean Games
9th Road race, Islamic Solidarity Games

=== Grand Tour general classification results timeline ===
Grand Tour	2017
Giro d'Italia	—
Tour de France	—
Vuelta a España	DNF

Legend
—	Did not compete
DNF	Did not finish
