= Tour du Bénin =

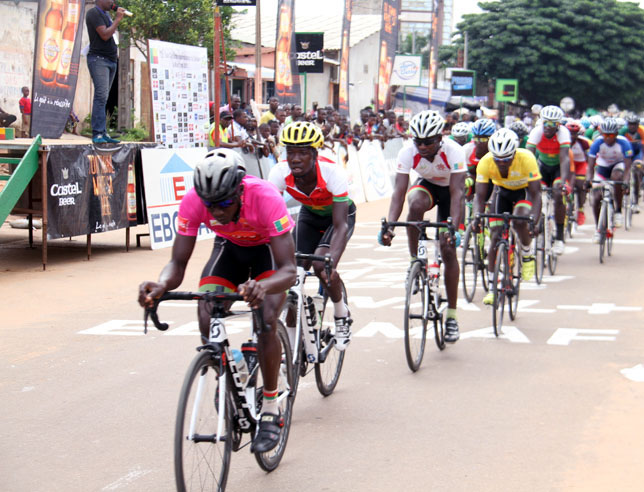

Race details
- Date: May
- Region: Benin
- Discipline: Road
- Competition: UCI Africa Tour
- Type: Stage race

History
- First edition: 1992
- Editions: 21 (as of 2026)
- First winner: Inoussa Saka (BEN)
- Most wins: Inoussa Saka (BEN) (5 wins)
- Most recent: Kristiāns Belohvoščiks (LAT)

The Tour du Bénin is a multi-day road cycling race annually held in Benin. Since 2022 it has been held as a 2.2 category event on the UCI Africa Tour.

== Winners ==
Year	Winner	Second	Third
1992	(Benin) Inoussa Saka		
1994	(Benin) Inoussa Saka		
1996	(Benin) Inoussa Saka		
1998	(Benin) Inoussa Saka		
2003	(Benin) Eric Ahouandjinou		
2004	(Benin) Inoussa Saka	(Niger) Ibrahim Abdoulaye	(Benin) Eric Ahouandjinou
2005–2013	No race		
2014	(France) Jérémy Letué	(France) Stéphane Cognet	(France) Sébastien Leday
2015	(Burkina Faso) Mathias Sorgho	(France) Jérémy Letué	(Senegal) Malick Thiam
2016	(Burkina Faso) Mathias Sorgho	(Ivory Coast) Abou Sanogo	(Burkina Faso) Noufou Minoungou
2017	(Burkina Faso) Abdoul Aziz Nikiéma	(Burkina Faso) Mathias Sorgho	(Burkina Faso) Harouna Ilboudo
2018	(Burkina Faso) Salif Yerbanga	(Burkina Faso) Seydou Bamogo	(Burkina Faso) Salfo Bikienga
2019	No race		
2020	No race		
2021	(Burkina Faso) Paul Daumont	(Burkina Faso) Souleymane Koné	(Burkina Faso) Harouna Ilboudo
2022	(Germany) Marcel Peschges	(Netherlands) Jarri Stravers	(Morocco) Adil El Arbaoui
2023	(Morocco) Achraf Ed-Doghmy	(Algeria) Yacine Hamza	(Cameroon) Clovis Kamzong
2024	(Morocco) Achraf Ed-Doghmy	(Algeria) Azzedine Lagab	(Eritrea) Yoel Habteab
2025	(South Africa) Reinardt Janse van Rensburg	(Morocco) Ibrahim Essabahy	(Netherlands) Tom Wijfje
2026	(Latvia) Kristiāns Belohvoščiks	(Mauritius) Alexandre Mayer	(Morocco) Youssef Bdadou
