= Tour du Sahel =

Race details
- Date: February
- Region: Sahel, Mauritania
- Discipline: Road
- Competition: UCI Africa Tour
- Type: Stage race
- Organiser: Mauritanian Cycling Federation

History
- First edition: 2018
- Editions: 5 (as of 2025)
- First winner: El Houcaine Sabbahi (MAR)
- Most wins: El Houcaine Sabbahi (MAR) (2 wins)
- Most recent: Stefan Verhoeff (NED)

The Tour du Sahel is a multi-day road cycling race annually held in Mauritania, in the Sahel region. The race was first held in 2018. Since 2023 it has been held as a 2.2 category event on the UCI Africa Tour.

== Winners ==
Year	Winner	Second	Third
2018	(Morocco) El Houcaine Sabbahi	(Algeria) Aymen Merdj	(Senegal) Bécaye Traoré
2019	(France) Grzegorz Kwiatkowski	(Libya) Allaeldin Ahmouda	(Morocco) Abdeladim Al Moutaouakkel
2020	(Morocco) El Houcaine Sabbahi	(Morocco) Yasser Tahiri	(Morocco) Lahcene Sabbahi
2021–2022	No race		
2023	(Morocco) Adil El Arbaoui	(Morocco) Achraf Ed Doghmy	(Morocco) El Houcaine Sabbahi
2024	No race		
2025	(Netherlands) Stefan Verhoeff	(Morocco) Anass Aït El Abdia	(Morocco) El Houcaine Sabbahi
