= Ismaïl Ayoune =

Moroccan cyclist (born 1987)

Personal information
- Born: 15 April 1987 (age 39)

Cycling career
- Sport: Cycling
- Discipline: Road
- Role: Rider

Ismaïl Ayoune (born 15 April 1987) is a Moroccan road cyclist. He rode at the 2013 UCI Road World Championships.

== Major results ==
2010
Les Challenges de la Marche Verte

3rd GP Al Massira
5th GP Sakia El Hamra
7th GP Oued Ed-Dahab

10th Overall Tour of Libya
2011
3rd National Time Trial Championships
Challenge des phosphates

6th Challenge Ben Guerir
8th Challenge Youssoufia

9th Overall Tour du Maroc
2012
Les Challenges de la Marche Verte

1st GP Al Massira
10th GP Sakia El Hamra

3rd Circuit d'Alger
Challenge du Prince

8th Trophée de la Maison Royale
10th Trophée de l'Anniversaire

2013
Les Challenges de la Marche Verte

1st GP Al Massira
2nd GP Oued Ed-Dahab
6th GP Sakia El Hamra

3rd National Time Trial Championships
6th Overall Tour de Tipaza
9th Circuit d'Alger
9th Trophée Princier, Challenge du Prince
2014
Les Challenges de la Marche Verte

2nd GP Sakia El Hamra
3rd GP Oued Ed-Dahab

2nd Trophée Princier, Challenge du Prince
9th Criterium International de Blida
