= Adil El Arbaoui =

Moroccan cyclist (born 1995)

Personal information
- Full name: Adil El Arbaoui
- Born: 15 February 1995 (age 31) Beni Mellal, Morocco
- Height: 1.75 m (5 ft 9 in)

Cycling career
- Sport: Cycling
- Current team: AVC Khourigba
- Discipline: Road
- Role: Rider

Amateur teams
- 2017–2020: CAKC Khénifra
- 2022–: AVC Khourigba
Medal record
Men's road bicycle racing
Representing Morocco
African Championships
Bronze medal – third place	2024 Eldoret	Time trial

Adil El Arbaoui (born 15 February 1995) is a Moroccan cyclist, who currently rides for amateur team AVC Khourigba.

== Major results ==
2019
National Road Championships

1st Road race
5th Time trial

Les Challenges de la Marche Verte

3rd GP Al Massira
6th GP Oued Eddahab
9th GP Sakia El Hamra

4th Overall Challenge International du Sahara Marocain
4th Trophée de l'Anniversaire, Challenge du Prince
9th Fatih Sultan Mehmet Kirklareli Race
2021
1st Stage 7 (TTT) Tour du Faso
8th Time trial, African Road Championships
2022
Challenge du Prince

1st Trophée de la Maison Royale
2nd Trophée de l'Anniversaire
9th Trophée Princier

2nd Time trial, National Road Championships
3rd Overall Tour du Bénin
5th Overall Tour du Cameroun

1st Stage 8

5th Grand Prix Sakia El Hamra, Les Challenges de la Marche Verte
5th Grand Prix Yahyalı
8th Road race, Islamic Solidarity Games
9th Road race, Mediterranean Games
10th Road race, Arab Road Championships
2023
1st Time trial, National Road Championships
1st Overall Tour du Sahel

1st Stage 1

2nd Overall Tour du Cameroun

1st Stage 4

5th Grand Prix du Prince Héritier Moulay el Hassan
6th Overall Tour du Bénin
