= Sport in Burkina Faso =

Sport in Burkina Faso is widespread and includes football, basketball, baseball, cycling, rugby union, handball, tennis, athletics, boxing, and martial arts.

== Football ==
Football is very popular in Burkina Faso, played both professionally and informally in towns and villages across the country. The national team is nicknamed "Les Etalons" ("the Stallions") in reference to the legendary horse of Princess Yennenga. In 1998, Burkina Faso hosted the African Cup of Nations for which the Omnisport Stadium in Bobo-Dioulasso was built.

== Basketball ==
Basketball is one of the top sports in Burkina Faso for both men and women. Its national team had its best year in 2013 when it qualified for the AfroBasket, the continent's most prestigious basketball event.

== Baseball ==
The sports of Baseball and Softball are becoming extremely popular in Burkina Faso. Fédération Burkinabè de Baseball et de Softball – FBBS is the controlling body. Baseball Burkina Faso is ranked 4th in Africa following the 2019 Baseball Africa Cup. Burkina Faso's Sanfo Lassina plays professional baseball for the Kochi Fighting Dogs in the Japanese professional league.

== Rugby union ==
Rugby union, or just rugby, in Burkina Faso is relatively new, but growing more popular every year. Rugby was introduced by the French, who had ruled Burkina Faso, or Upper Volta, as it was known at the time, for many years. Rugby in Burkina Faso is, like many other nations in Africa, centered around the capital, Ouagadougou.

== Cycling ==
Cycling is widespread both as a sport and as a cheap means of transport. The Tour du Faso, approved by the Fédération internationale de cyclisme, is a cycling event held annually in November that covers 1,305 kilometres (811 mi). The stage race takes place at temperatures up to 40 °C. It has been part of the UCI Africa Tour since 2005.

== Olympic Games ==
Burkina Faso has sent athletes to every Summer Olympic Games held since 1988. Under its previous name of Upper Volta, the country also competed in 1972. Hugues Fabrice Zango won Burkina Faso's first ever Olympic medal when he won bronze in the men's triple jump at the 2020 Summer Olympics. No athletes from Burkina Faso have competed in any Winter Olympic Games.
