= Diego Tamayo =

Colombian cyclist

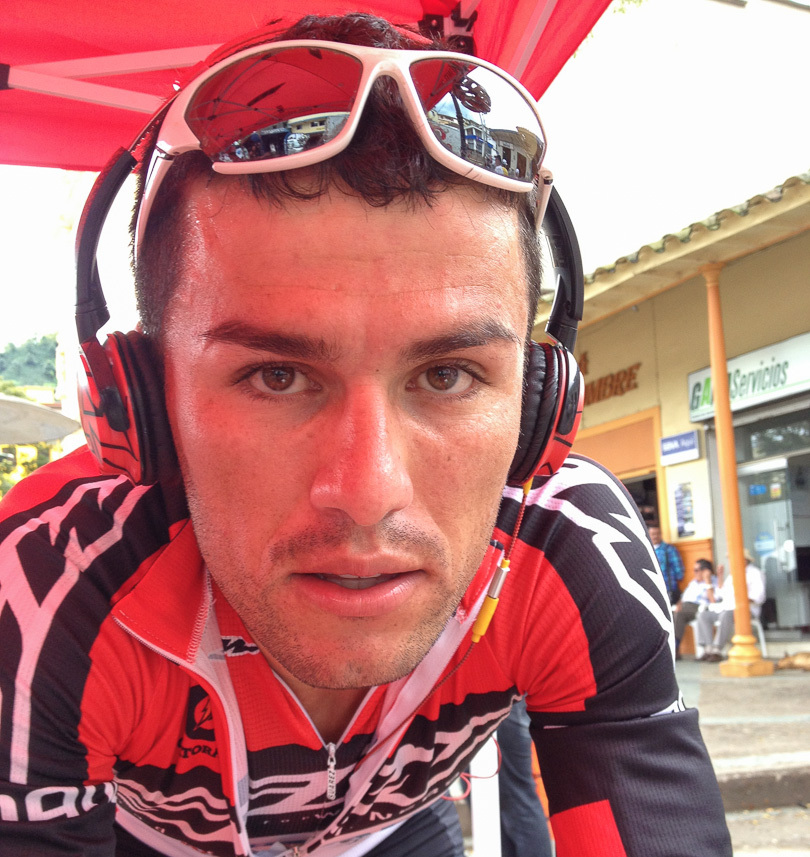

Personal information
- Full name: Diego Alejandro Tamayo Martínez
- Born: 19 September 1983 (age 43) Palestina, Caldas, Colombia

Cycling career
- Sport: Cycling
- Current team: Retired
- Discipline: Road
- Role: Rider

Amateur teams
- 2004: Café Baqué amateur
- 2005: CAI
- 2008: Azpiru–Ugarte
- 2012: UPV–Bancaja
- 2013: GW–Shimano
- 2015: Barri–Trek Bicycle Store
- 2016: Tomas Belles–Cannondale
- 2017: Esteve–Chozas

Professional teams
- 2006–2007: Atom
- 2009–2010: Carmiooro A Style
- 2011–2012: Team WIT

Diego Alejandro Tamayo Martínez (born 19 September 1983) is a Colombian former road cyclist.

== Major results ==
2007
6th Clásica Memorial Txuma
7th Overall Vuelta a Navarra
2008
1st Overall Vuelta a Navarra

1st Stage 5

2009
8th Grand Prix de Plumelec-Morbihan
10th Memorial Marco Pantani
2011
1st Circuit de Wallonie
2012
1st Overall Vuelta a Toledo
2015
1st Overall Titan Desert
