= Tarik Chaoufi =

Moroccan cyclist

Personal information
- Full name: Tarik Chaoufi
- Born: 26 February 1986 (age 40) Azrou, Morocco
- Height: 1.74 m (5 ft 9 in)
- Weight: 65 kg (143 lb; 10.2 st)

Cycling career
- Sport: Cycling
- Current team: Sidi Ali–Unlock Sports Team
- Discipline: Road
- Role: Rider

Amateur team
- 2019: US Casablanca

Professional teams
- 2013: Euskaltel–Euskadi
- 2015: Al Marakeb Cycling Team
- 2020–: Sidi Ali Pro Cycling

Major wins
- National Road Race Championships (2012); UCI Africa Tour (2011–12)

Tarik Chaoufi (born 26 February 1986) is a Moroccan professional road racing cyclist, who currently rides for UCI Continental team Sidi Ali–Unlock Sports Team.

In 2013, he became the first Moroccan to become a professional cyclist when he signed for Euskaltel–Euskadi, but he left the team in August.

== Major results ==
2006
10th Overall Tour du Maroc
2008
1st Prix du Printemps
2009
1st Stage 3 Tour d'Egypte
1st Stage 8 Tour des Aéroports
4th Overall Tour du Faso
6th Overall Tour du Rwanda
9th Grand Prix of Sharm-el-Sheikh
2010
Les Challenges de la Marche Verte

1st GP Al Massira
3rd GP Sakia El Hamra
5th GP Oued Eddahab

1st Stage 8 Tour du Rwanda
3rd Road race, National Road Championships
7th Emirates Cup
10th Overall Tour du Mali

1st Stage 4

2011
1st Maria Grand Prix Orlando
1st Stage 6 Tour du Maroc
Challenge du Prince

2nd Trophée de l'Anniversaire
3rd Trophée de la Maison Royale
5th Trophée Princier

Challenge des phosphates

3rd Challenge Youssoufia
4th Challenge Ben Guerir

4th Overall Tour d'Algérie
10th Overall Kwita Izina Cycling Tour
2012
1st Road race, National Road Championships
1st Overall 2011–12 UCI Africa Tour
Les Challenges de la Marche Verte

1st GP Sakia El Hamra
2nd GP Oued Eddahab
4th GP Al Massira

Challenge des phosphates

1st Challenge Khouribga
6th Challenge Youssoufia

Challenge du Prince

1st Trophée Princier
2nd Trophée de la Maison Royale
3rd Trophée de l'Anniversaire

1st Stage 7 Tour du Maroc
La Tropicale Amissa Bongo

1st Mountains classification
1st Stage 4

2013
7th Road race, National Road Championships
2014
Challenge du Prince

1st Trophée de la Maison Royale
2nd Trophée de l'Anniversaire

2nd Critérium International d'Alger
3rd Road race, National Road Championships
9th GP Al Massira, Les Challenges de la Marche Verte
10th Grand Prix d'Oran
2015
Challenge du Prince

2nd Trophée de la Maison Royale
6th Trophée Princier
8th Trophée de l'Anniversaire
