= Mohammed Said El Ammoury =

Moroccan cyclist (born 1977)

Personal information
- Born: 29 June 1977 (age 49)

Cycling career
- Sport: Cycling
- Discipline: Road
- Role: Rider

Mohammed Said El Ammoury (born 29 June 1977) is a Moroccan cyclist.

== Major results ==
2008
3rd National Road Race Championships
2009
1st Stage 5 Tour of Eritrea
3rd Overall Tour du Faso
2010
1st National Road Race Championships
1st Stage 2 Tour du Mali
1st Challenge du Prince, Trophée de l'Anniversaire
3rd Les Challenges de la Marche Verte, GP Oued Ed-Dahab
