= Bahrain Cycling Academy =

Bahraini cycling team

Team information
- UCI code: VIB (2017–2019); BCA (2020–)
- Registered: Bahrain
- Founded: 2017
- Discipline: Road
- Status: UCI Continental
- Bicycles: Merida

Team name history
- 2017 2018–2019 2020–: VIB Bikes (VIB); VIB Sports (VIB); Bahrain Cycling Academy (BCA)

Bahrain Cycling Academy is a Bahraini UCI Continental cycling team founded in 2017. The team support the next generation of Bahrain cyclists, in order to improve them to the world top level.

== Team roster ==
As of 31 January 2021.

Rider	Date of birth
Anass Aït El Abdia (MAR)	21 March 1993 (age 33)
Sayed Ahmed Alawi (BHN)	30 December 1987 (age 38)
Isa Ayoob (BHN)	14 March 1993 (age 33)
Javier Gil (ESP)	16 September 1996 (age 29)
Abdulla Habib (BHN)	12 October 1994 (age 31)

Rider	Date of birth
Mansoor Jawad (BHN)	17 September 1987 (age 38)
Yahiaaldien Khalefa (BHN)	1 January 1995 (age 31)
Ahmed Naser (BHN)	4 November 2000 (age 25)
Eusebio Pascual (ESP)	18 May 1995 (age 31)
Ali Saleh (BHN)	3 November 1987 (age 38)

== Major results ==
2018
Stage 3 Tour d'Algérie, Axel Costa
Stage 6 Tour d'Algérie, Ali Nouisri
