= Adil Jelloul =

Moroccan cyclist

Personal information
- Full name: Adil Jelloul
- Born: 14 July 1982 (age 44) Ifrane, Morocco
- Height: 1.65 m (5 ft 5 in)
- Weight: 58 kg (128 lb)

Cycling career
- Sport: Cycling
- Discipline: Road
- Role: Rider

Professional team
- 2014–2016: Skydive Dubai Pro Cycling

Major wins
- One day races National Road Race Championships (2002, 2007–2009, 2011, 2014) Other UCI Africa Tour (2010–11, 2012–13)

Adil Jelloul (born 14 July 1982) is a Moroccan road bicycle racer. He competed at the 2012 Summer Olympics in the Men's road race.

== Major results ==
2002
1st Road race, National Road Championships
2004
1st Stage 7 Tour du Maroc
2006
2nd Road race, National Road Championships
5th Overall Tour du Faso
9th Overall Tour du Maroc
2007
1st Road race, National Road Championships
1st Overall Tour du Sénégal
1st Overall Tour du Faso

1st Stage 8

2nd Road race, Pan Arab Games
4th Road race, African Road Championships
10th Overall Tour du Maroc
2008
1st Road race, National Road Championships
3rd H. H. Vice-President's Cup
2009
1st Road race, National Road Championships
1st Overall Tour of Rwanda

1st Stage 1

4th Grand Prix of Sharm el-Sheikh
9th Overall Tour du Faso
10th Overall Tour du Maroc

1st Stage 4

2010
2nd Overall Tour du Mali

1st Stage 1

Les Challenges de la Marche Verte

2nd GP Sakia El Hamra
2nd GP Oued Eddahab
7th GP Al Massira

4th Road race, African Road Championships
4th Overall Tour of Rwanda
Challenge du Prince

5th Trophée de l'Anniversaire
7th Trophée de la Maison Royale

9th Overall Tour du Maroc
2011
1st Overall 2010–11 UCI Africa Tour
1st Road race, National Road Championships
Les Challenges Phosphatiers

1st Challenge Youssoufia
3rd Challenge Ben Guerir
5th Challenge Khouribga

2nd Overall Tour d'Algérie
2nd Circuit d'Alger
African Road Championships

3rd Team time trial
9th Road race

3rd Overall La Tropicale Amissa Bongo
3rd Overall Kwita Izina Cycling Tour
4th Overall Tour du Maroc
Challenge du Prince

4th Trophée Princier
4th Trophée de l'Anniversaire
4th Trophée de la Maison Royale

2012
2nd Time trial, National Road Championships
2nd Overall Tour d'Algérie
2nd Overall Tour du Maroc
Les Challenges Phosphatiers

2nd Challenge Youssoufia
4th Challenge Khouribga

Challenge du Prince

2nd Trophée de l'Anniversaire
4th Trophée Princier

3rd Overall La Tropicale Amissa Bongo
Les Challenges de la Marche Verte

3rd GP Al Massira
6th GP Sakia El Hamra

4th Overall Czech Cycling Tour
5th Circuit d'Alger
2013
1st Overall 2012–13 UCI Africa Tour
Les Challenges de la Marche Verte

1st GP Oued Eddahab
4th GP Sakia El Hamra
4th GP Al Massira

Challenge du Prince

1st Trophée Princier
2nd Trophée de l'Anniversaire
5th Trophée de la Maison Royale

2nd Overall Tour de Tipaza

1st Points classification

3rd Road race, National Road Championships
7th Overall Tour du Maroc
8th Overall Tour d'Algérie
2014
1st Road race, National Road Championships
2nd Overall Jelajah Malaysia
4th Melaka Chief Minister's Cup
9th Overall Sharjah International Cycling Tour
10th Overall Tour of Thailand
2015
5th Overall Tour d'Egypte
8th Road race, African Road Championships
8th Overall Tour du Maroc
2016
1st Overall Sharjah International Cycling Tour

1st Stage 1 (TTT)

6th Overall La Tropicale Amissa Bongo

1st Stage 4
