= Mohcine El Kouraji =

Moroccan cyclist

Personal information
- Full name: Mohcine El Kouraji
- Born: 1 December 1997 (age 28) Marrakesh, Morocco
- Height: 1.74 m (5 ft 9 in)

Cycling career
- Sport: Cycling
- Current team: Al Shafar Jumeirah Cycling Team
- Discipline: Road
- Role: Rider

Amateur teams
- 2015: World Cycling Centre
- 2017: UC Orléans
- 2019: US Casablanca
- 2022–: Al Shafar Jumeirah Cycling Team

Professional team
- 2020–2021: Sidi Ali Pro Cycling

Mohcine El Kouraji (born 1 December 1997 in Marrakesh) is a Moroccan cyclist, who has represented his country at international events. He currently rides for Emirati club team Al Shafar Jumeirah Cycling Team.

He competed in the men's road race at the 2020 Summer Olympics.

== Major results ==
2015
1st Time trial, National Junior Road Championships
African Junior Road Championships

2nd Team time trial
5th Road race

2016
1st Overall Tour de Côte d'Ivoire

1st Young rider classification

3rd Time trial, National Road Championships
Challenge du Prince

3rd Trophée de l'Anniversaire
3rd Trophée de la Maison Royale
10th Trophée Princier

8th Overall Tour du Maroc

1st Young rider classification

2018
3rd Overall Tour de l'Espoir
2019
2nd Time trial, National Road Championships
2nd Time trial, National Under-23 Road Championships
5th Trophée de la Maison Royale, Challenge du Prince
8th Overall Tour of Mevlana
10th Overall Tour of Central Anatolia
2020
6th Grand Prix Gazipaşa
2021
1st Stage 7 (TTT) Tour du Faso
8th Road race, African Road Championships
2022
National Road Championships

1st Time trial
3rd Road race

2023
1st Overall Tour du Cameroun
Pan Arab Games

1st Time trial
1st Team time trial

National Road Championships

3rd Road race
3rd Time trial

7th Grand Prix du Prince Héritier Moulay el Hassan
8th Grand Prix du Trône
