= Challenge du Prince =

Moroccan road cycling races

Race details
- Region: Morocco
- Discipline: Road
- Competition: UCI Africa Tour
- Type: Three One-day races

History
- First edition: 2010
- Editions: 10 (as of 2022)

The Challenge du Prince is a series of one-day races held annually since 2010 in Morocco. It consists of three races: Trophée de l'Anniversaire, Trophée de la Maison Royale and Trophée Princier, with each rated as a 1.2 event on the UCI Africa Tour.

== Winners – Trophée de l'Anniversaire ==
Year	Country	Rider	Team
2010	Morocco	Mohammed Said El Ammoury	
2011	Ukraine	Volodymyr Bileka	Amore & Vita-Conad
2012	Morocco	Reda Aadel	
2013	Tunisia	Rafaâ Chtioui	
2014	Morocco	Mouhssine Lahsaini	
2015	Morocco	Essaïd Abelouache	Fath Union Sport
2016	Morocco	Soufiane Sahbaoui	
2017	Italy	Umberto Marengo	Delio Gallina Colosio Eurofeed
2018	No race		
2019	Algeria	Youcef Reguigui	
2020–2021	No race		
2022	Morocco	Nasser Eddine Maatougui	Sidi Ali–Unlock Team

== Winners – Trophée de la Maison Royale ==
Year	Country	Rider	Team
2010	Italy	Adriano Angeloni	Betonexpressz 2000
2011	Russia	Vladislav Borisov	Amore & Vita-Conad
2012	Morocco	Abdelati Saadoune	
2013	Tunisia	Maher Hasnaoui	
2014	Morocco	Tarik Chaoufi	
2015	Morocco	Anass Ait El Abdia	
2016	Morocco	Mouhssine Lahsaini	
2017	Morocco	Ahmed Galdoune	Delio Gallina Colosio Eurofeed
2018	No race		
2019	Algeria	Youcef Reguigui	
2020–2021	No race		
2022	Morocco	Adil El Arbaoui	Morocco (national team)

== Winners – Trophée Princier ==
Year	Country	Rider	Team
2010	Argentina	Roberto Richeze	Betonexpressz 2000
2011	Algeria	Azzedine Lagab	Groupement Sportif Pétrolier Algérie
2012	Morocco	Tarik Chaoufi	
2013	Morocco	Adil Jelloul	
2014	Morocco	Abdelatif Saadoune	
2015	Morocco	Salah Eddine Mraouni	Centre Mondial du Cyclisme
2016	France	Thomas Vaubourzeix	Lupus Racing Team
2017	France	Thomas Vaubourzeix	Lupus Racing Team
2018	No race		
2019	South Africa	Jayde Julius	ProTouch
2020–2021	No race		
2022	Morocco	Achraf Ed-Doghmy	Morocco (national team)
