= Challenge des phosphates =

Series of races in Monaco

Race details
- Region: Morocco
- Discipline: Road
- Competition: UCI Africa Tour
- Type: Three One-day races
- Web site: www.marocainecyclisme.com

History
- First edition: 2011
- Editions: 3 (as of 2015)

The Challenge des phosphates is a series of One-day races held annually since 2011 in Morocco. It consists of three One-day races; Grand prix de Khouribga, Grand Prix Fkih Ben Saleh and Grand prix de Ben Guerir, each rated 1.2 and is part of UCI Africa Tour.

== Winners – Grand prix de Khouribga ==
Year	Country	Rider	Team
2011	Slovakia	Maros Kovác	Dukla Trencin-Merida
2012	Morocco	Tarik Chaoufi	
2015	Morocco	Abdelati Saadoune	

== Winners – Grand Prix Fkih Ben Saleh ==
Year	Country	Rider	Team
2011	Morocco	Adil Jelloul	
2012	Morocco	Mouhssine Lahsaini	
2015	Morocco	Abdelati Saadoune	

== Winners – Grand prix de Ben Guerir ==
Year	Country	Rider	Team
2011	Morocco	Hassan Zahboune	
2012	Algeria	Abdallah Benyoucef	Groupement Sportif des Pétroliers d'Algérie
2015	Morocco	Lahcen Saber	
