= Les Challenges de la Marche Verte =

Moroccan series of one-day road cycling races

Race details
- Region: Morocco
- Discipline: Road
- Competition: UCI Africa Tour
- Type: Three One-day races

History
- First edition: 2010
- Editions: 8 (as of 2022)

The Les Challenges de la Marche Verte is a series of One-day races held annually since 2010 in Morocco. It consists of three One-day races; GP Sakia El Hamra, GP Oued Eddahab and GP Al Massira, each rated 1.2 and is part of UCI Africa Tour.

== Winners – GP Sakia El Hamra ==
Year	Country	Rider	Team
2010	Morocco	Mouhssine Lahsaini	
2012	Morocco	Tarik Chaoufi	
2013	Morocco	Essaïd Abelouache	
2014	Morocco	Essaïd Abelouache	
2015	Morocco	Salah Eddine Mraouni	
2017	Morocco	Ahmed Amine Galdoune	
2018	No race		
2019	Germany	Hermann Keller	Team Embrace The World
2020–2021	No race		
2022	United Arab Emirates	Ahmed Al Mansoori	United Arab Emirates (national team)

== Winners – GP Oued Eddahab ==
Year	Country	Rider	Team
2010	Morocco	Abdelati Saadoune	
2012	Latvia	Andris Smirnovs	Rietumu-Delfin
2013	Morocco	Adil Jelloul	
2014	Morocco	Mouhssine Lahsaini	
2015	Morocco	Essaïd Abelouache	
2017	Russia	Ivan Balykin	Torku Şekerspor
2018	No race		
2019	South Africa	Jason Oosthuizen	TEG Pro Cycling Team
2020–2021	No race		
2022	Germany	Heiko Homrighausen	Team Embrace The World

== Winners – GP Al Massira ==
Year	Country	Rider	Team
2010	Morocco	Tarik Chaoufi	
2012	Morocco	Ismail Ayoune	
2013	Morocco	Ismail Ayoune	
2014	Belarus	Aleksandar Aleksiev	
2015	Morocco	Abdelati Saadoune	
2017	Turkey	Ahmet Örken	Torku Şekerspor
2018	No race		
2019	South Africa	Gustav Basson	TEG Pro Cycling Team
2020–2021	No race		
2022	Netherlands	Jules de Cock	Global Cycling Team
