= 2016 UCI Africa Tour =

Cycling competition

- Twelfth edition of the UCI Africa Tour

Details
- Dates: 18 January 2016–16 October 2016
- Location: Africa
- Races: 25

Champions
- Individual champion: Issak Tesfom Okubamariam (ERI) (Sharjah Team)
- Teams' champion: Al Nasr Pro Cycling Team–Dubai
- Nations' champion: Eritrea

The 2016 UCI Africa Tour was the 12th season of the UCI Africa Tour. The season began on 18 January with the La Tropicale Amissa Bongo and ended on 16 October with the Grand Prix Chantal Biya.

The points leader, based on the cumulative results of previous races, wears the UCI Africa Tour cycling jersey. Salah Eddine Mraouni (289 points) of Morocco is the defending champion of the 2015 UCI Africa Tour.

Throughout the season, points are awarded to the top finishers of stages within stage races and the final general classification standings of each of the stages races and one-day events. The quality and complexity of a race also determines how many points are awarded to the top finishers, the higher the UCI rating of a race, the more points are awarded. The UCI ratings from highest to lowest are as follows:

- Multi-day events: 2.HC, 2.1 and 2.2
- One-day events: 1.HC, 1.1 and 1.2

== Events ==
Date	Race Name	Location	UCI Rating	Winner	Team
28 Dec–2 Jan	Tour of Egypt	Egypt	2.2	Mounir Makhchoun (MAR)	Morocco national team
18–24 January	La Tropicale Amissa Bongo	Gabon	2.1	Adrien Petit (FRA)	Direct Énergie
22 February	African Continental Championships – Team Time Trial	Morocco	CC	Elias Afewerki (ERI); Mekseb Debesay (ERI); Amanuel Gebreigzabhier (ERI); Tesfom Okubamariam (ERI)	Eritrea national team
24 February	African Continental Championships – Time Trial U23	Morocco	CC	Valens Ndayisenga (RWA)	Rwanda national team
24 February	African Continental Championships – Time Trial	Morocco	CC	Mouhssine Lahsaini (MAR)	Morocco national team
26 February	African Continental Championships – Road Race U23	Morocco	CC	Amanuel Gebreigzabhier (ERI)	Eritrea national team
26 February	African Continental Championships – Road Race	Morocco	CC	Tesfom Okubamariam (ERI)	Eritrea national team
4 March	Circuit d'Alger	Algeria	1.2	Jesús Alberto Rubio (ESP)	Al Nasr Pro Cycling Team–Dubai
5–7 March	Tour d'Oranie	Algeria	2.2	Luca Wackermann (ITA)	Al Nasr Pro Cycling Team–Dubai
8 March	GP de la Ville d'Oran	Algeria	1.2	Tomas Vaitkus (LTU)	Al Nasr Pro Cycling Team–Dubai
10–12 March	Tour de Blida	Algeria	2.2	Luca Wackermann (ITA)	Al Nasr Pro Cycling Team–Dubai
12–20 March	Tour du Cameroun	Cameroon	2.2	Mohammed Amine Errafai (MAR)	Morocco national team
13–16 March	Tour de Setif	Algeria	2.2	Essaïd Abelouache (MAR)	Al Nasr Pro Cycling Team–Dubai
17 March	Critérium International de Sétif	Algeria	1.2	Adil Barbari (ALG)	Al Nasr Pro Cycling Team–Dubai
19–22 March	Tour d'Annaba	Algeria	2.2	Luca Wackermann (ITA)	Al Nasr Pro Cycling Team–Dubai
23–25 March	Tour de Constantine	Algeria	2.2	Tomas Vaitkus (LTU)	Al Nasr Pro Cycling Team–Dubai
26 March	Circuit de Constantine	Algeria	1.2	Joseph Areruya (RWA)	Rwanda national team
28 March	Critérium International de Blida	Algeria	1.2	Nassim Saidi (ALG)	Al Marakeb Cycling Team
1–10 April	Tour du Maroc	Morocco	2.2	Stefan Schumacher (GER)	Christina Jewelry Pro Cycling
16 April	Fenkil Northern Red Sea Challenge	Eritrea	1.2	Mikiel Habtom (ERI)	Team Salina
17 April	Massawa Circuit	Eritrea	1.2	Tesfom Okubamariam (ERI)	Sharjah Team
19–23 April	Tour Eritrea	Eritrea	2.2	Merhawi Goitom (ERI)	Team Tsen'at
23–30 April	Tour du Sénégal	Senegal	2.2	Abdellah Benyoucef (ALG)	Algeria national team
24 April	Asmara Circuit	Eritrea	1.2	Yonas Fissahaye (ERI)	Eritrea national team
5 May	Trophée Princier	Morocco	1.2	Thomas Vaubourzeix (FRA)	Lupus Racing Team
7 May	Trophée de l'Anniversaire	Morocco	1.2	Soufiane Sahbaoui (MAR)	Centre Maroc
8 May	Trophée de la Maison Royale	Morocco	1.2	Mouhssine Lahsaini (MAR)	Al Marakeb Cycling Team
21–25 May	Tour de Tunisie	Tunisia	2.2	Abderrahmane Mansouri (ALG)	Sharjah Team
28 Aug–2 Sep	Tour Ethiopian Meles Zenawi	Ethiopia	2.2	Tedros Redae (ETH)	Ethiopia national team
24–30 September	Tour de Côte d'Ivoire	Ivory Coast	2.2	Mohcine El Kouraji (MAR)	Morocco national team
12–16 October	Grand Prix Chantal Biya	Cameroon	2.2	Martial Roman (FRA)	Selection Auvergne Rhône Alpes

== Final standings ==
=== Individual classification ===
Rank	Name	Team	Points
1	Issak Tesfom Okubamariam (ERI)	Sharjah Team	432
2	Adil Barbari (ALG)	Al Nasr Pro Cycling Team–Dubai	284
3	Soufiane Haddi (MAR)	Skydive Dubai–Al Ahli	281
4	Abderrahmane Mansouri (ALG)	Sharjah Team	244
5	Mouhssine Lahsaini (MAR)		219
6	Essaïd Abelouache (MAR)	Al Nasr Pro Cycling Team–Dubai	218
7	Luca Wackermann (ITA)	Al Nasr Pro Cycling Team–Dubai	212
8	Youcef Reguigui (ALG)	Team Dimension Data	200
9	Elias Afewerki (ERI)	Sharjah Team	192
10	Tomas Vaitkus (LTU)	Al Nasr Pro Cycling Team–Dubai	180

=== Teams classification ===
Rank	Team	Points
1	Al Nasr Pro Cycling Team–Dubai	1019
2	Skydive Dubai–Al Ahli	523
3	Dimension Data for Qhubeka	507
4	Sharjah Team	415
5	Direct Énergie	214
6	Al Marakeb Cycling Team	211
7	Fortuneo–Vital Concept	203
8	Stradalli–Bike Aid	163
9	Lupus Racing Team	102
10	Unieuro–Wilier	90

=== Nations classification ===
Rank	Nation	Points
1	Eritrea	1582
2	Morocco	1417.5
3	Algeria	1277
4	South Africa	662
5	Rwanda	502
6	Tunisia	404
7	Ethiopia	343
8	Egypt	167.32
9	Namibia	142
10	Ivory Coast	81
