= 2015 UCI Africa Tour =

Bicycle racing tournament season

- Eleventh edition of the UCI Africa Tour

Details
- Dates: 14 January 2015–20 December 2015
- Location: Africa
- Races: 34

Champions
- Individual champion: Salah Eddine Mraouni (MAR)
- Teams' champion: Skydive Dubai–Al Ahli
- Nations' champion: Morocco

The 2015 UCI Africa Tour was the 11th season of the UCI Africa Tour. The season began on 14 January with the Tour d'Egypte and ended on 20 December with the GP de Youssoufia.

The points leader, based on the cumulative results of previous races, wears the UCI Africa Tour cycling jersey.

Throughout the season, points are awarded to the top finishers of stages within stage races and the final general classification standings of each of the stages races and one-day events. The quality and complexity of a race also determines how many points are awarded to the top finishers, the higher the UCI rating of a race, the more points are awarded. The UCI ratings from highest to lowest are as follows:

- Multi-day events: 2.HC, 2.1 and 2.2
- One-day events: 1.HC, 1.1 and 1.2

== Events ==
Date	Race Name	Location	UCI Rating	Winner	Team
14–18 January	Tour d'Egypte	Egypt	2.2	Francisco Mancebo (ESP)	Skydive Dubai–Al Ahli
9 February	African Continental Championships – Team Time Trial	South Africa	CC	Natnael Berhane (ERI); Mekseb Debesay (ERI); Merhawi Kudus (ERI); Daniel Teklehaimanot (ERI)	Eritrea (national team)
11 February	African Continental Championships – Time Trial	South Africa	CC	Tsgabu Grmay (ETH)	Ethiopia (national team)
14 February	African Continental Championships – Road Race	South Africa	CC	Louis Meintjes (RSA)	South Africa (national team)
16–22 February	La Tropicale Amissa Bongo	Gabon	2.1	Rafaâ Chtioui (TUN)	Skydive Dubai–Al Ahli
26 February	GP Sakia El Hamra	Morocco	1.2	Salah Eddine Mraouni (MAR)	Morocco (national team)
28 February	GP Oued Eddahab	Morocco	1.2	Essaïd Abelouache (MAR)	Morocco (national team)
1 March	GP Al Massira	Morocco	1.2	Abdelatif Saadoune (MAR)	Morocco (national team)
6 March	Circuit d'Alger	Algeria	1.2	Hichem Chaabane (ALG)	Olympic Team Algérie Tour Aglo37
7–9 March	Tour d'Oranie	Algeria	2.2	Azzedine Lagab (ALG)	Groupement Sportif des Pétroliers d'Algérie
10 March	GP de la Ville d'Oran	Algeria	1.2	Janvier Hadi (RWA)	Rwanda (national team)
12–14 March	Tour de Blida	Algeria	2.2	Mekseb Debesay (ERI)	Bike Aid
14–22 March	Tour du Cameroun	Cameroon	2.2	Clovis Kamzong (CMR)	Cameroon (national team)
15 March	Critérium International de Sétif	Algeria	1.2	Mekseb Debesay (ERI)	Bike Aid
16–19 March	Tour de Setif	Algeria	2.2	Nabil Baz (ALG)	Vélo Club Sovac
21–24 March	Tour d'Annaba	Algeria	2.2	Hichem Chaabane (ALG)	Olympic Team Algérie Tour Aglo37
25–27 March	Tour de Constantine	Algeria	2.2	Amanuel Gebrezgabihier (ERI)	Eritrea (national team)
28 March	Circuit de Constantine	Algeria	1.2	Hichem Chaabane (ALG)	Olympic Team Algérie Tour Aglo37
30 March	Critérium International de Blida	Algeria	1.2	Abdelbaset Hannachi (ALG)	Groupement Sportif des Pétroliers d'Algérie
3–12 April	Tour du Maroc	Morocco	2.2	Tomasz Marczyński (POL)	Torku-Şekerspor
27 April	PMB Road Classic	South Africa	1.2	Reynard Butler (RSA)	Team Abantu
1 May	Mayday Classic	South Africa	1.2	Hendrik Kruger (RSA)	Team Abantu
3 May	Hibiscus Cycle Classic	South Africa	1.2	Metkel Eyob (ERI)	MTN-Qhubeka Feeder Team
7 May	Trophée Princier	Morocco	1.2	Salah Eddine Mraouni (MAR)	Morocco (national team)
9 May	Trophée de l'Anniversaire	Morocco	1.2	Essaïd Abelouache (MAR)	Morocco (national team)
10 May	Trophée de la Maison Royale	Morocco	1.2	Anass Ait El Abdia (MAR)	Morocco (national team)
26 Sep–2 Oct	Tour de Côte d'Ivoire	Ivory Coast	2.2	Mouhssine Lahsaini (MAR)	Morocco (national team)
14–18 Oct	GP Chantal Biya	Cameroon	2.2	Mouhssine Lahsaini (MAR)	Morocco (national team)
31 Oct–8 Nov	Tour du Faso	Burkina Faso	2.2	Mouhssine Lahsaini (MAR)	Morocco (national team)
15–22 Nov	Tour of Rwanda	Rwanda	2.2	Jean Bosco Nsengimana (RWA)	Rwanda Karisimbi
17 Dec	GP de Khouribga	Morocco	1.2	Mouhssine Lahsaini (MAR)	Morocco (national team)
19 Dec	GP Fkih Ben Saleh	Morocco	1.2	Abdelatif Saadoune (MAR)	Morocco national team
20 Dec	GP de Ben Guerir	Morocco	1.2	Lahcen Saber (MAR)	Morocco national team

== Standings ==
Final Standings

Rank	Name	Team	Points
1.	Salah Eddine Mraouni (MAR)		241
2.	Mouhssine Lahsaini (MAR)	Al Marakeb Cycling Team	231
3.	Rafaâ Chtioui (TUN)	Skydive Dubai–Al Ahli	221
4.	Mekseb Debesay (ERI)	Bike Aid	219.67
5.	Essaïd Abelouache (MAR)		212
6.	Abderrahmane Mansouri (ALG)		156
7.	Anasse Ait El Abdia (MAR)		149
8.	Azzedine Lagab (ALG)	GS des Pétroliers d'Algérie	140
9.	Abdelbaset Hanachi (ALG)	GS des Pétroliers d'Algérie	139
10.	Janvier Hadi (RWA)		136.33

Rank	Team	Points
1.	Skydive Dubai–Al Ahli	571
2.	GS des Pétroliers d'Algérie	499
3.	MTN–Qhubeka	471.02
4.	Al Marakeb Cycling Team	403
5.	Bike Aid	239,67

Rank	Nation	Points
1.	Morocco	1 270
2.	Algeria	1 161.8
3.	South Africa	876.88
4.	Eritrea	802.88
5.	Rwanda	597.99
