= 2013–14 UCI Africa Tour =

- Tenth edition of the UCI Africa Tour

Details
- Dates: 16 October 2013–5 December 2014
- Location: Africa

Champions
- Individual champion: Mekseb Debesay (Bike Aid)

The 2013–14 UCI Africa Tour was the tenth season of the UCI Africa Tour. The season began on 16 October 2013 with the Grand Prix Chantal Biya and ended on 23 November 2014 with the Tour of Rwanda.

The points leader, based on the cumulative results of previous races, wore the UCI Africa Tour cycling jersey. Adil Jelloul of Morocco was the defending champion of the 2012–13 UCI Africa Tour.

Throughout the season, points were awarded to the top finishers of stages within stage races and the final general classification standings of each of the stages races and one-day events. The quality and complexity of a race also determines how many points are awarded to the top finishers, the higher the UCI rating of a race, the more points are awarded.

The UCI ratings from highest to lowest are as follows:

- Multi-day events: 2.HC, 2.1 and 2.2
- One-day events: 1.HC, 1.1 and 1.2

The 2013−14 competition was won by Mekseb Debesay of Eritrea, who rode for the Bike Aid cycling team.

== Events ==
=== 2013 ===
| Date | Race Name | Location | UCI Rating | Winner | Team |
|---|---|---|---|---|---|
| 16–20 October | Grand Prix Chantal Biya | Cameroon | 2.2 | Yves Ngué Ngock (CMR) | SNH Vélo Club |
| 25 October–3 November | Tour du Faso | Burkina Faso | 2.2 | Abdoul-Aziz Nikiema (BUR) | Burkina Faso (national team) |
| 17–24 November | Tour of Rwanda | Rwanda | 2.2 | Dylan Girdlestone (RSA) | South Africa (national team) |
| 29 November | African Continental Championships – Team Time Trial | Egypt | CC | Natnael Berhane (ERI); Daniel Teklehaimanot (ERI); Meron Russom (ERI); Meron Teshome (ERI) | Eritrea (national team) |
| 1 December | African Continental Championships – Time Trial | Egypt | CC | Daniel Teklehaimanot (ERI) | Eritrea (national team) |
| 5 December | African Continental Championships – Road Race | Egypt | CC | Tesfom Okbamariam (ERI) | Eritrea (national team) |

=== 2014 ===
| Date | Race Name | Location | UCI Rating | Winner | Team |
|---|---|---|---|---|---|
| 13–19 January | La Tropicale Amissa Bongo | Gabon | 2.1 | Natnael Berhane (ERI) | Team Europcar |
| 27 February | GP Sakia El Hamra | Morocco | 1.2 | Essaïd Abelouache (MAR) | Morocco (national team) |
| 1 March | GP Oued Eddahab | Morocco | 1.2 | Mouhssine Lahsaini (MAR) | Morocco (national team) |
| 2 March | GP Al Massira | Morocco | 1.2 | Aleksander Alekseev (BUL) | Brisaspor |
| 8 March | Criterium d'Alger | Algeria | 1.2 | Thomas Rabou (NED) | OCBC Singapore Continental Cycling Team |
| 9–13 March | Tour d'Algérie | Algeria | 2.2 | Mekseb Debesay (ERI) | Eritrea (national team) |
| 9–18 March | Tour du Cameroun | Cameroon | 2.2 | Dan Craven (NAM) | Bike Aid-Ride for Help |
| 14 March | GP d'Oran | Algeria | 1.2 | Adel Barbari (ALG) | Vélo Club Sovac |
| 16–18 March | Tour de Blida | Algeria | 2.2 | Amanuel Gebrezgabihier (ERI) | Eritrea (national team) |
| 19–21 March | Tour de Setif | Algeria | 2.2 | Thomas Lebas (FRA) | Bridgestone–Anchor |
| 22 March | Criterium de Setif | Algeria | 1.2 | Mouhssine Lahsaini (MAR) | Morocco (national team) |
| 24–27 March | Tour de Constantine | Algeria | 2.2 | Sergey Belykh (RUS) | Team 21 |
| 28 March | Circuit d'Alger | Algeria | 1.2 | Azzedine Lagab (ALG) | Groupement Sportif Pétrolier Algérie |
| 29 March | Criterium de Blida | Algeria | 1.2 | Marco Amicabile (ITA) | Gragnano Sporting Club |
| 4–13 April | Tour du Maroc | Morocco | 2.2 | Julien Loubet (FRA) | GSC Blagnac Vélo Sport 31 |
| 6–12 April | Mzansi Tour | South Africa | 2.2 | Jacques Janse van Rensburg (RSA) | MTN–Qhubeka |
| 9 May | Trophée Princier | Morocco | 1.2 | Abdelati Saadoune (MAR) | Morocco (national team) |
| 10 May | Trophée de l'Anniversaire | Morocco | 1.2 | Mouhssine Lahsaini (MAR) | Morocco (national team) |
| 12 May | Trophée de la Maison Royale | Morocco | 1.2 | Tarik Chaoufi (MAR) | Morocco (national team) |
| 6–9 Nov | GP Chantal Biya | Cameroon | 2.2 | Mekseb Debesay (ERI) | Bike Aid-Ride for Help |
| 16–23 Nov | Tour of Rwanda | Rwanda | 2.2 | Valens Ndayisenga (RWA) | Rwanda Karisimbi |
