= 2012–13 UCI Africa Tour =

- Ninth edition of the UCI Africa Tour

Details
- Dates: 3 October 2012–12 May 2013
- Location: Africa
- Races: 29

Champions
- Individual champion: Adil Jelloul (MAR)
- Teams' champion: MTN–Qhubeka
- Nations' champion: Morocco

The 2012–13 UCI Africa Tour was the ninth season of the UCI Africa Tour. The season began on 3 October 2012 with the Grand Prix Chantal Biya and ended on 12 May 2013 with the Trophée de la Maison Royale.

The points leader, based on the cumulative results of previous races, wears the UCI Africa Tour cycling jersey. Tarik Chaoufi of Morocco was the defending champion of the 2011–12 UCI Africa Tour. Adil Jelloul of Morocco was crowned as the 2012–13 UCI Africa Tour champion.

Throughout the season, points are awarded to the top finishers of stages within stage races and the final general classification standings of each of the stages races and one-day events. The quality and complexity of a race also determines how many points are awarded to the top finishers, the higher the UCI rating of a race, the more points are awarded. The UCI ratings from highest to lowest are as follows:

- Multi-day events: 2.HC, 2.1 and 2.2
- One-day events: 1.HC, 1.1 and 1.2

== Events ==
=== 2012 ===
Date	Race Name	Location	UCI Rating	Winner	Team
3–7 October	Grand Prix Chantal Biya	Cameroon	2.2	Alexandre Mercier (SUI)	Team Jura Suisse
19–28 October	Tour du Faso	Burkina Faso	2.2	Rasmane Ouedraogo (BUR)	Burkina Faso (national team)
7 November	African Continental Championships – Team Time Trial	Burkina Faso	CC	Daniel Teklehaymanot (ERI); Natnael Berhane (ERI); Freqalsi Debesay (ERI); Jani Tewelde (ERI)	Eritrea (national team)
9 November	African Continental Championships – Time Trial	Burkina Faso	CC	Daniel Teklehaymanot (ERI)	Eritrea (national team)
11 November	African Continental Championships – Road Race	Burkina Faso	CC	Natnael Berhane (ERI)	Eritrea (national team)
18–25 November	Tour of Rwanda	Rwanda	2.2	Darren Lill (RSA)	South Africa (national team)

=== 2013 ===
Date	Race Name	Location	UCI Rating	Winner	Team
14–20 January	La Tropicale Amissa Bongo	Gabon	2.1	Yohann Gène (FRA)	Team Europcar
16–17 February	Fenkel Northern Redsea	Eritrea	2.2	Tesfay Abraha (ERI)	MTN Qhubeka-WCC Africa Team
19–22 February	Tour of Eritrea	Eritrea	2.2	Mekseb Debesay (ERI)	Eritrea (national team)
24 February	Circuit of Asmara	Eritrea	1.2	Abdalla Ben Youcef (ALG)	Groupement Sportif Petrolier Algérie
26 February	GP Sakia El Hamra	Morocco	1.2	Essaïd Abelouache (MAR)	Morocco (national team)
27 February	GP Oued Eddahab	Morocco	1.2	Adil Jelloul (MAR)	Morocco (national team)
28 February	GP Al Massira	Morocco	1.2	Ismail Ayoune (MAR)	Morocco (national team)
11–15 March	Tour d'Algérie	Algeria	2.2	Víctor de la Parte (ESP)	SP Tableware
16 March	Circuit d'Alger	Algeria	1.2	Martin Pedersen (DEN)	Christina Watches–Onfone
18–20 March	Tour de Tipaza	Algeria	2.2	Constantino Zaballa (ESP)	Christina Watches–Onfone
21–23 March	Tour de Blida	Algeria	2.2	Hichem Chabane (ALG)	Vélo Club Sovac
29 March-7 April	Tour du Maroc	Morocco	2.2	Mathieu Perget (FRA)	CMI-Greenover
17–21 April	Mzansi Tour	South Africa	2.2	Robert Hunter (RSA)	South Africa (national team)
10 May	Trophée Princier	Morocco	1.2	Adil Jelloul (MAR)	Morocco national team
11 May	Trophée de l'Anniversaire	Morocco	1.2	Rafaâ Chtioui (TUN)	Tunisia national team
12 May	Trophée de la Maison Royale	Morocco	1.2	Maher Hasnaoui (TUN)	Tunisia national team

== Final standings ==
=== Individual classification ===
Rank	Name	Points
1.	Adil Jelloul (MAR)	223
2.	Hichem Chaabane (ALG)	143.67
3.	Essaïd Abelouache (MAR)	137
4.	Yohann Gène (FRA)	130
5.	Rafaâ Chtioui (TUN)	127.67
6.	Mathieu Perget (FRA)	124
7.	Jay Thomson (RSA)	123
8.	Rasmane Ouedraogo (BUR)	120.33
9.	Soufiane Haddi (MAR)	119
10.	Reda Aadel (MAR)	113

=== Team classification ===
Rank	Team	Points
1.	MTN–Qhubeka	332.67
2.	Vélo Club SOVAC	291.68
3.	Team Europcar	240.67
4.	Christina Watches-Onfone	234
5.	Groupement Sportif Pétrolier Algérie	225
6.	Torku Şekerspor	134
7.	SP Tableware	108
8.	Dukla Trenčín-Trek	80
9.	BDC-Marcpol Team	55
10.	La Pomme Marseille	45

=== Nation classification ===
Rank	Nation	Points
1.	Morocco	929
2.	Eritrea	826.54
3.	Algeria	500.01
4.	South Africa	433
5.	Tunisia	288.68
6.	Burkina Faso	248.32
7.	Ethiopia	147
8.	Rwanda	140.32
9.	Lesotho	140
10.	Zimbabwe	131

=== Nation under-23 classification ===
Rank	Nation	Points
1.	Eritrea	714.87
2.	Morocco	260
3.	Algeria	130.01
4.	Ethiopia	130
5.	South Africa	69
6.	Rwanda	60.33
7.	Lesotho	45
8.	Gabon	40
9.	Tunisia	40
10.	Ivory Coast	40
