= Adil Barbari =

Algerian cyclist

Personal information
- Full name: Adil Barbari
- Born: 27 May 1993 (age 33) El Kantara, Algeria

Cycling career
- Sport: Cycling
- Current team: Retired
- Discipline: Road
- Role: Rider

Professional teams
- 2012–2014: Vélo Club Sovac Algérie
- 2015: Groupement Sportif des Pétroliers d'Algérie
- 2016: Al Nasr Pro Cycling Team–Dubai
Medal record
Men's cycling
Representing Algeria
African Games
Bronze medal – third place	2015 Brazzaville	Road race
Bronze medal – third place	2015 Brazzaville	Time trial

Adil Barbari (born 27 May 1993) is an Algerian former professional racing cyclist.

== Major results ==
2011
4th Overall Mazandaran Tour

1st Stage 2

2012
1st Time trial, Arab Clubs Road Championships
Tour du Faso

1st Stages 9 & 10

African Road Championships

3rd Team time trial
4th Time trial

2013
National Road Championships

1st Time trial
1st Under-23 time trial

Tour du Faso

1st Stages 4 & 8

African Road Championships

2nd Team time trial
4th Time trial

6th Circuit d'Alger
7th Time trial, Mediterranean Games
7th Overall Tour de Gironde
2014
National Road Championships

1st Under-23 road race
2nd Time trial
4th Road race

1st Grand Prix d'Oran
1st Stage 1 Tour d'Algérie
6th Circuit d'Alger
2015
National Road Championships

1st Under-23 time trial
2nd Time trial

2nd Overall Tour de Blida

1st Stage 2

African Games

3rd Road race
3rd Time trial

3rd Time trial, African Under-23 Road Championships
3rd Overall Tour d'Oranie

1st Young rider classification

4th Circuit de Constantine
2016
1st Critérium International de Sétif
2nd Time trial, National Road Championships
2nd Overall Tour d'Annaba

1st Points classification
1st Stages 1 & 3

2nd Overall Tour International de Sétif

1st Stage 3

3rd Grand Prix d'Oran
4th Overall Tour de Constantine

1st Points classification
1st Stages 1 & 3

4th Overall Tour de Blida

1st Stage 2

5th Time trial, African Road Championships
6th Critérium International de Blida
6th Critérium International d'Alger
8th Circuit de Constantine
