= 2015 UCI men's road cycling rankings =

For the 2015 season the UCI revamped the points system used to rank riders. The following table summarises the new rankings, how points are scored towards them and how points are scaled.

== UCI back track ==
The new set of rankings was met with much consternation from many of the UCI WorldTour teams due to the nature of the points changes. Teams highlighted that they had signed riders and designed race programmes which were themselves designed around using the 2014 points system. As a result, during the 2015 Tour Down Under the UCI took the decision to revert to the 2014 rankings. Therefore, for the 2015 season there will be the following rankings: UCI World Tour, Africa Tour, America Tour, Asia Tour, Europe Tour and finally Oceania Tour. Within each of these rankings there will be individual, team and nation rankings.

== Rankings ==
=== UCI World Tour ===
==== Individual ====
Rank	Name	Team	Points
1	Alejandro Valverde (ESP)	Movistar Team	675
2	Joaquim Rodríguez (ESP)	Team Katusha	474
3	Nairo Quintana (COL)	Movistar Team	457
4	Alexander Kristoff (NOR)	Team Katusha	453
5	Fabio Aru (ITA)	Astana	448
6	Chris Froome (GBR)	Team Sky	430
7	Alberto Contador (ESP)	Tinkoff–Saxo	407
8	Greg Van Avermaet (BEL)	BMC Racing Team	324
9	Rui Costa (POR)	Lampre–Merida	324
10	Thibaut Pinot (FRA)	FDJ	319
11	Richie Porte (AUS)	Team Sky	314
12	John Degenkolb (GER)	Team Giant–Alpecin	302
13	Rigoberto Urán (COL)	Etixx–Quick-Step	301
14	Geraint Thomas (GBR)	Team Sky	283
15	Tom Dumoulin (NED)	Team Giant–Alpecin	271
16	Simon Špilak (SLO)	Team Katusha	269
17	Peter Sagan (SVK)	Tinkoff–Saxo	257
18	Domenico Pozzovivo (ITA)	AG2R La Mondiale	242
19	Vincenzo Nibali (ITA)	Astana	238
20	Michael Matthews (AUS)	Orica–GreenEDGE	221
21	Daniel Moreno (ESP)	Team Katusha	216
22	Bauke Mollema (NED)	Trek Factory Racing	212
23	Romain Bardet (FRA)	AG2R La Mondiale	206
24	André Greipel (GER)	Lotto–Soudal	203
25	Tim Wellens (BEL)	Lotto–Soudal	195

- 215 riders scored points. 48 other riders finished in positions that would have earned them points, but they were ineligible as members of non-WorldTour teams.

==== Teams ====
Rank	Team	Points	Top 5 riders	WTTT
1	Movistar Team	1619	Valverde (675), N. Quintana (457), J. Izagirre (173), Amador (93), Intxausti (81)	140
2	Team Katusha	1606	Rodríguez (474), Kristoff (453), Špilak (269), D. Moreno (216), Zakarin (194)	0
3	Team Sky	1378	Froome (430), Porte (314), Thomas (283), Ser. Henao (167), Nieve (104)	80
4	Etixx–Quick-Step	1158	Urán (301), Kwiatkowski (195), Alaphilippe (180), Štybar (172), Terpstra (140)	170
5	Astana	1106	Aru (448), Nibali (238), Landa (164), Boom (102), Fuglsang (64)	90
6	BMC Racing Team	1010	Van Avermaet (324), Gilbert (179), Dennis (135), van Garderen (96), Evans (76)	200
7	Tinkoff–Saxo	929	Contador (407), P. Sagan (257), Majka (165), Kreuziger (64), Breschel (36)	0
8	Orica–GreenEDGE	845	Matthews (221), A. Yates (150), S. Yates (148), Chaves (134), Albasini (62)	130
9	Lotto–Soudal	832	Greipel (203), Wellens (195), Gallopin (127), De Clercq (106), Benoot (101)	100
10	Team Giant–Alpecin	769	Degenkolb (302), T. Dumoulin (271), Barguil (34), Geschke (32), Sinkeldam (10)	120
11	AG2R La Mondiale	587	Pozzovivo (242), Bardet (206), Bakelants (59), Vuillermoz (49), Riblon (31)	0
12	Lampre–Merida	566	Costa (324), Ulissi (98), Bonifazio (60), Modolo (43), Valls (41)	0
13	Trek Factory Racing	529	Mollema (212), Nizzolo (78), Felline (64), Cancellara (59), Jungels (46)	70
14	LottoNL–Jumbo	485	Gesink (114), Kelderman (111), Kruijswijk (80), Vanmarcke (52), Lindeman (18)	110
15	FDJ	439	Pinot (319), Geniez (44), Démare (33), Roux (22), Morabito (21)	0
16	Cannondale–Garmin	340	Hesjedal (102), D. Martin (85), Talansky (54), Navardauskas (50), Slagter (49)	0
17	IAM Cycling	189	Frank (72), Elmiger (56), Pantano (27), Pelucchi (20), Sy. Chavanel (14)	0

==== Nations ====
Rank	Nation	Points	Top 5 riders (if applicable)
1	Spain	1945	Valverde (675), Rodríguez (474), Contador (407), D. Moreno (216), J. Izagirre (173)
2	Italy	1106	Aru (448), Pozzovivo (242), Nibali (238), Ulissi (98), Paolini (80)
3	Colombia	1099	N. Quintana (457), Urán (301), Ser. Henao (167), Chaves (134), Atapuma (40)
4	Great Britain	1041	Froome (430), Thomas (283), A. Yates (150), S. Yates (148), Cavendish (30)
5	Belgium	905	Van Avermaet (324), Wellens (195), Gilbert (179), De Clercq (106), Benoot (101)
6	France	881	Pinot (319), Bardet (206), Alaphilippe (180), Gallopin (127), Vuillermoz (49)
7	Netherlands	848	T. Dumoulin (271), Mollema (212), Terpstra (140), Gesink (114), Kelderman (111)
8	Australia	777	Porte (314), Matthews (221), Dennis (135), Evans (76), Rogers (31)
9	Germany	587	Degenkolb (302), Greipel (203), T. Martin (40), Geschke (32), Kittel (10)
10	Norway	453	Kristoff (453)
11	Poland	376	Kwiatkowski (195), Majka (165), Bodnar (16)
12	Portugal	355	Costa (324), Oliveira (24), Cardoso (6), Machado (1)
13	Czech Republic	306	Štybar (172), König (70), Kreuziger (64)
14	Slovenia	294	Špilak (269), Polanc (16), Mezgec (9)
15	Switzerland	270	Frank (72), Albasini (62), Cancellara (59), Elmiger (56), Morabito (21)

- Riders from 34 countries scored points.

=== UCI Continental Rankings ===
==== UCI Africa Tour ====
Rank	Name	Team	Points
1.	Salah Eddine Mraouni (MAR)		241
2.	Mouhssine Lahsaini (MAR)	Al Marakeb Cycling Team	231
3.	Rafaâ Chtioui (TUN)	Skydive Dubai–Al Ahli	221
4.	Mekseb Debesay (ERI)	Bike Aid	219.67
5.	Essaïd Abelouache (MAR)		212
6.	Abderrahmane Mansouri (ALG)		156
7.	Anasse Ait El Abdia (MAR)		149
8.	Azzedine Lagab (ALG)	GS des Pétroliers d'Algérie	140
9.	Abdelbaset Hanachi (ALG)	GS des Pétroliers d'Algérie	139
10.	Janvier Hadi (RWA)		136.33

Rank	Team	Points
1.	Skydive Dubai–Al Ahli	571
2.	GS des Pétroliers d'Algérie	499
3.	MTN–Qhubeka	471.02
4.	Al Marakeb Cycling Team	403
5.	Bike Aid	239,67

Rank	Nation	Points
1.	Morocco	1 270
2.	Algeria	1 161.8
3.	South Africa	876.88
4.	Eritrea	802.88
5.	Rwanda	597.99

==== UCI America Tour ====
Rank	Name	Team	Points
1.	Toms Skujiņš (LAT)	Hincapie Racing	208.4
2.	Byron Guamá (ECU)	Movistar Team Ecuador	198
3.	Michael Woods (CAN)	Optum-Kelly Benefit Strategies	179
4.	Daniel Díaz (ARG)	Carrefour Funvic Soul Cycling Team	158
5.	Óscar Sevilla (SPA)	EPM-UNE-Área Metropolitana	136.6
6.	William Chiarello (BRA)		135
7.	Miguel Ubeto (VEN)		129
8.	Manuel Rodas (GUA)		126
9.	Kiel Reijnen (USA)	UnitedHealthcare	124
10.	Rob Britton (CAN)	Team SmartStop	112

Rank	Team	Points
1.	Optum-Kelly Benefit Strategies	494
2.	Carrefour Funvic Soul Cycling Team	481
3.	Hincapie Racing	400
4.	UnitedHealthcare	343
5.	EPM-UNE-Área Metropolitana	332.2

Rank	Nation	Points
1	Colombia	890.35
2	Canada	850
3	Argentina	788
4	United States	687
5	Venezuela	682

==== UCI Asia Tour ====
Rank	Name	Team	Points
1.	Samad Pourseyedi (IRI)	Tabriz Petrochemical Team	378
2.	Jakub Mareczko (ITA)	Southeast Pro Cycling	362
3.	Hossein Askari (IRI)	Pishgaman-Giant Team	335
4.	Mattia Gavazzi (ITA)	Amore & Vita-Selle SMP	333
5.	Andrea Palini (ITA)	Skydive Dubai Pro Cycling Team - Al Ahli Club	240
6.	Rahim Emami (IRI)	Pishgaman-Giant Team	239
7.	Patrick Bevin (NZL)	Avanti Racing Team	198
8.	Marko Kump (SLO)	Adria Mobil	177
9.	Youcef Reguigui (ALG)	MTN-Qhubeka	163
10.	Hossein Alizadeh (IRI)	RTS-Santic Racing Team	162

Rank	Team	Points
1.	Pishgaman-Giant Team	956
2.	Tabriz Petrochemical Team	726
3.	Nippo-Vini Fantini	542
4.	Southeast Pro Cycling	539
5.	RTS-Santic Racing Team	476

Rank	Nation	Points
1.	Iran	1643
2.	Kazakhstan	602
3.	Japan	541
4.	South Korea	276
5.	Philippines	264

==== UCI Europe Tour ====
Rank	Name	Team	Points
1.	Nacer Bouhanni (FRA)	Cofidis	721
2.	Edward Theuns (BEL)	Topsport Vlaanderen–Baloise	649
3.	Dimitri Claeys (BEL)	Verandas Willems	524.25
4.	Edvald Boasson Hagen (NOR)	MTN–Qhubeka	480
5.	Marko Kump (SLO)	Adria Mobil	476
6.	Vitaliy Buts (UKR)	Kolss BDC Team	405
7.	Gaetan Bille (BEL)	Verandas Willems	373.25
8.	Bryan Coquard (FRA)	Team Europcar	373
9.	Davide Rebellin (ITA)	CCC–Sprandi–Polkowice	368
10.	Primož Roglič (SLO)	Adria Mobil	337

Rank	Team	Points
1.	Topsport Vlaanderen–Baloise	1693
2.	Cofidis	1600.2
3.	Bretagne–Séché Environnement	1476
4.	Kolss BDC Team	1383.75
5.	Verandas Willems	1345.25
6.	RusVelo	1300.92
7.	Wanty–Groupe Gobert	1276
8.	CCC–Sprandi–Polkowice	1181
9.	Southeast Pro Cycling	1167.5
10.	Caja Rural–Seguros RGA	966.1

Rank	Nation	Points
1.	Belgium	3364
2.	Italy	2914.3
3.	France	2649.4
4.	Spain	2155.6
5.	Netherlands	1890.25
6.	Slovenia	1882.8
7.	Ukraine	1851.5
8.	Russia	1783.17
9.	Denmark	1457.68
10.	Norway	1451

==== UCI Oceania Tour ====
Rank	Name	Team	Points
1.	Taylor Gunman (NZL)	Avanti Racing Team	152
2.	Patrick Bevin (NZL)	Avanti Racing Team	135
3.	Joseph Cooper (NZL)	Avanti Racing Team	100
4.	Jordan Kerby (AUS)	Drapac Professional Cycling	74
5.	Jason Christie (NZL)	Avanti Racing Team	72
6.	Thomas Davison (NZL)	Avanti Racing Team	46
7.	James Oram (NZL)	Axeon Cycling Team	46
8.	Daniel Berry (NZL)	Team Budget Forklifts	44
9.	Samuel Horgan (NZL)	Team Budget Forklifts	30
10.	Neil Van Der Ploeg (AUS)	Avanti Racing Team	29

Rank	Team	Points
1.	Avanti Racing Team	546
2.	Drapac Professional Cycling	155
3.	Team Budget Forklifts	142
4.	Axeon Cycling Team	46
5.	Data3-Symantec Racing Team p/b Scody	30

Rank	Nation	Points
1.	New Zealand	1175.4
2.	Australia	708.5
