= Essaïd Abelouache =

Moroccan cyclist

Personal information
- Full name: Essaïd Abelouache
- Born: 20 July 1988 (age 38) Agadir, Morocco

Cycling career
- Sport: Cycling
- Current team: Al Shafar Jumeirah Cycling Team
- Discipline: Road
- Role: Rider

Amateur teams
- 2015: Fath Union Sport
- 2022–: Al Shafar Jumeirah Cycling Team

Professional teams
- 2016: Al Nasr Pro Cycling Team–Dubai
- 2018: Sharjah Team

Essaïd Abelouache (born 20 July 1988) is a Moroccan racing cyclist, who rides for Emirati amateur team Al Shafar Jumeirah Cycling Team. He rode at the 2014 UCI Road World Championships.

== Major results ==
2011
National Road Championships

2nd Road race
6th Time trial

2012
Les Challenges de la Marche Verte

2nd GP Al Massira
8th GP Oued Eddahab
9th GP Sakia El Hamra

Challenge du Prince

3rd Trophée Princier
7th Trophée de la Maison Royale

8th Road race, National Road Championships
2013
Les Challenges de la Marche Verte

1st GP Sakia El Hamra
3rd GP Oued Eddahab
5th GP Al Massira

Tour du Maroc

1st Points classification
1st Stages 1 & 5

3rd Overall 2012–13 UCI Africa Tour
5th Overall Tour d'Algérie

1st Points classification

Challenge du Prince

5th Trophée Princier
7th Trophée de la Maison Royale
7th Trophée de l'Anniversaire

6th Time trial, National Road Championships
2014
Les Challenges de la Marche Verte

1st GP Sakia El Hamra
4th GP Oued Eddahab

1st Stage 3 Tour d'Algérie
2nd Overall Grand Prix Chantal Biya
3rd Critérium International d'Alger
Challenge du Prince

3rd Trophée de l'Anniversaire
4th Trophée de la Maison Royale

4th Road race, National Road Championships
5th Critérium International de Blida
6th Grand Prix d'Oran
8th Overall Tour du Maroc
2015
Challenge du Prince

1st Trophée de l'Anniversaire
2nd Trophée Princier
5th Trophée de la Maison Royale

Les Challenges de la Marche Verte

1st GP Oued Eddahab
2nd GP Sakia El Hamra
5th GP Al Massira

La Tropicale Amissa Bongo

1st Sprints classification
1st Stage 6 (TTT)

2nd Road race, National Road Championships
3rd Overall UCI Africa Tour
3rd UAE Cup
Challenge des phosphates

3rd Grand Prix Fkih Ben Saleh
4th Grand Prix de Khouribga
10th Grand Prix de Ben Guerir

5th Circuit d'Alger
8th Overall Tour d'Egypte
2016
1st Overall Tour International de Sétif

1st Mountains classification
1st Stage 2

2nd Overall Tour d'Oranie
2nd Circuit de Constantine
3rd Overall Tour de Blida
3rd Overall Tour de Constantine

1st Mountains classification

4th Overall Tour d'Annaba

1st Mountains classification
1st Stage 4

5th Overall Tour of Mersin

1st Points classification
1st Stage 4

7th Grand Prix d'Oran
10th Circuit d'Alger
10th Critérium International de Blida
2017
1st Road race, National Road Championships
2nd Trophée Princier, Challenge du Prince
9th GP Sakia El Hamra, Les Challenges de la Marche Verte
2018
10th Overall Grand Prix International de la ville d'Alger
