= Abderrahmane Bechlaghem =

Algerian cyclist (born 1995)

Personal information
- Full name: Abderrahmane Bechlaghem
- Born: 6 July 1995 (age 31) Algeria

Cycling career
- Sport: Cycling
- Discipline: Road
- Role: Rider

Amateur teams
- 2013: Tours Agglo 37
- 2015: Tours Agglo 37
- 2015–2016: AS Sûreté nationale
- 2018: AS Sûreté nationale

Professional teams
- 2014: Olympique Team Algérie–Tour Aglo 37
- 2016: Sharjah Team
- 2019: Sovac Algérie

Abderrahmane Bechlaghem (born 6 July 1995) is an Algerian cyclist, who most recently rode for UCI Continental team Sovac Algérie. In 2019, Bechlagem was the winner of the Algerian National Road Race Championships.

== Major results ==
2012
African Junior Road Championships

1st Road race
1st Time trial

Arab Junior Road Championships

1st Road race
3rd Time trial

2013
Arab Junior Road Championships

1st Time trial
2nd Road race

African Junior Road Championships

3rd Time trial
3rd Team time trial
9th Road race

2014
8th Overall Tour d'Algérie
2015
2nd Team time trial, African Games
2nd Overall Tour d'Annaba

1st Young rider classification

3rd Circuit de Constantine
6th Overall Tour de Blida
2016
1st Young rider classification La Tropicale Amissa Bongo
2nd Circuit d'Alger
4th Grand Prix d'Oran
8th Time trial, African Road Championships
9th Overall Tour de Blida
2017
3rd Time trial, National Under-23 Road Championships
8th Time trial, African Road Championships
2019
1st Road race, National Road Championships
