= Abderrahmane Mansouri =

Algerian cyclist (born 1995)

Personal information
- Full name: Abderrahmane Mansouri
- Born: 13 January 1995 (age 31) Algeria

Cycling career
- Sport: Cycling
- Current team: Mouloudia Club d'Alger
- Discipline: Road
- Role: Rider

Amateur teams
- 2017: Vélo Club Sovac
- 2022: Yasi Cycling Team
- 2023–: Mouloudia Club d'Alger

Professional teams
- 2014–2015: Vélo Club Sovac
- 2016: Sharjah Team
- 2018: Sharjah Team
- 2019: Sovac Algérie

Major wins
- One-Day Races and Classics National Road Race Championships (2015, 2016)

Abderrahmane Mansouri (born 13 January 1995) is an Algerian racing cyclist, who rides for Algerian amateur team Mouloudia Club d'Alger. In 2015 and 2016 he won the Algerian National Road Race Championships.

== Major results ==
2012
National Junior Road Championships

1st Road race
1st Time trial

African Junior Road Championships

3rd Time trial
7th Road race

2013
National Junior Road Championships

1st Road race
1st Time trial

African Junior Road Championships

2nd Road race
3rd Team time trial
4th Time trial

2014
1st Road race, Arab Road Championships
4th Grand Prix d'Oran
6th Critérium International de Sétif
7th Overall Tour d'Algérie
8th Overall Sharjah International Cycling Tour
9th Overall Tour de Constantine
2015
1st Road race, National Road Championships
African Games

2nd Team time trial
10th Road race

2nd Overall Tour International de Sétif

1st Young rider classification

2nd Circuit de Constantine
3rd Overall Tour de Constantine

1st Stage 2

4th Circuit d'Alger
5th Overall Tour du Faso

1st Young rider classification

8th Overall Tour Internationale d'Oranie
2016
National Road Championships

1st Road race
1st Under-23 road race
3rd Time trial

1st Overall Tour de Tunisie
2nd Team time trial, African Road Championships
3rd Overall Tour d'Annaba

1st Young rider classification

3rd Overall Tour du Sénégal

1st Young rider classification
1st Stage 1

3rd Circuit de Constantine
6th Critérium International de Sétif
7th Overall Tour Internationale d'Oranie
8th Overall Tour International de Sétif
2017
1st Team time trial, Arab Road Championships
2nd Team time trial, African Road Championships
National Under-23 Road Championships

2nd Time trial
2nd Road race

6th Overall Tour Meles Zenawi
2018
2nd Overall Tour d'Algérie
3rd Team time trial, African Road Championships
5th Overall Grand Prix International de la ville d'Alger
7th Overall Tour International de la Wilaya d'Oran
2019
National Road Championships

3rd Time trial
3rd Road race

5th Trophée Princier, Challenge du Prince
2021
3rd Road race, National Road Championships
2022
1st Stage 5 Grand Prix Chantal Biya
3rd Time trial, National Road Championships
