= Nabil Baz =

Algerian cyclist

Personal information
- Born: 6 June 1987 (age 39) Algeria

Cycling career
- Sport: Cycling
- Discipline: Road
- Role: Rider

Professional teams
- 2011–2012: Ville d'Alger–Aïn Benian
- 2013–2015: Vélo Club Sovac

Nabil Baz (born 6 June 1987) is an Algerian racing cyclist. He rode at the 2013 UCI Road World Championships.

== Major results ==
2008
2nd Grand Prix de la ville de Tunis
2011
5th Overall Tour d'Algérie
7th Road race, All-Africa Games
9th Circuit d'Alger
2015
1st Overall Tour International de Sétif

1st Stage 1

2nd Overall Tour d'Oranie
5th Overall Tour de Constantine
5th Circuit de Constantine
6th Circuit d'Alger
7th Overall Tour du Maroc
2016
4th Critérium International de Blida
10th Circuit de Constantine
