= Azzedine Lagab =

Algerian cyclist

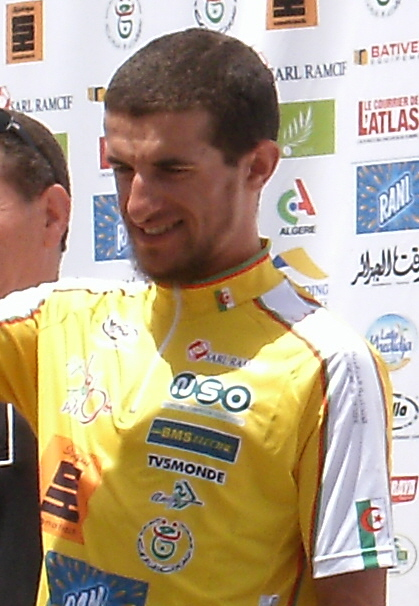

Personal information
- Full name: Azzedine Lagab
- Born: 18 September 1986 (age 40) Algiers, Algeria
- Height: 1.75 m (5 ft 9 in)
- Weight: 63 kg (139 lb)

Cycling career
- Sport: Cycling
- Current team: Madar Pro Cycling Team
- Discipline: Road
- Role: Rider

Amateur teams
- 2016: Groupement Sportif des Pétroliers d'Algérie
- 2017: Naturablue
- 2022–2023: Mouloudia Club Alger

Professional teams
- 2009: Doha Team
- 2011–2015: Groupement Sportif Pétrolier Algérie
- 2018: Groupement Sportif des Pétroliers d'Algérie
- 2019: VIB Sports
- 2020–2021: Groupement Sportif des Pétroliers
- 2021: Bike Aid
- 2024–: Madar Pro Cycling Team

Major wins
- National Road Race Championships (2010, 2012, 2021, 2024); National Time Trial Championships (2008, 2011, 2012, 2014, 2016, 2017, 2021, 2022, 2024, 2025)

Azzedine Lagab (born 18 September 1986) is an Algerian road bicycle racer, who currently rides for UCI Continental team Madar Pro Cycling Team. During his career, he has won medals in Algerian national championships, in African and Arab cycling championships as well as at the All Africa Games and the Pan-Arab Games.

== Career ==
=== 2006–2009 ===
As a youngster, Lagab took part in the Tour de l'Espoir, a stage race within his own country for young and talented riders. He finished in second place in the first stage of this race with the finish line in Bordj Bou Arreridj. It was the start of the career of a cyclist who would become one of the best cyclists in his country. The proof of that already came in the following year when he became second in the individual time trial of the Algerian national road cycling championships. Then in 2008 he went on to win two races in Tunisia, the Grand Prix de la ville de Tunis and the Grand Prix de la Banque de l'Habitat. Later on he improved his national time trial second place by winning the event in 2008. In addition he also became second in the road race at the same championships. This all resulted in his first contract with a UCI Continental team namely Doha Team for the 2009 cycling season. With this team, he took part in the Tour d'Alger in which he won the third stage, with start and departure in Alger as well as the general classification at the end. In another Algerian stage race, the Tour de Wilaya de Tipaza he finished in third place overall. Then in the Jelajah Malaysia he rode to a fifth place in the sixth stage, while he ended up in eighth position overall in the Tour of Singkarak. Team Doha then let him ride on the Presidential Tour of Iran where he took the seventh place overall. This year at the Algerian national road cycling championships he took a second place in the individual time trial. He then won the Grandglise criterium in Belgium before taking part at the 2009 Mediterranean Games in Pescara in which he placed 17th in the individual time trial and 19th in the road race. In the Tour des Aéroports in Tunisia he placed second in the first stage, before clinching the silver medal at the individual time trial of the 2009 Arab Cycling Championships. He finished 2009 with a third place in the Ouverture Saison de l'Algérie at the end of October.

=== 2010 ===
For the 2010 cycling season, the Doha Team did not return to the Continental circuit. As Lagab did not get a new contract with any other team he had to take a step back again. Still, 2010 turned out to be a good year for him in which he booked many successes. Already in January, he won a local Algerian race called Oued Al Alleug. In the Grand Prix International d'Alger he finished third in both the first and third stage and also reached the third spot in the general classification. Then in this year's Tour de Wilaya de Tipaza he won the first stage and finished third in the third stage. Lagab then traveled to Morocco to take part in the Challenges du Prince. He finished third in the Trophée Princier, second in the Trophée de l'Anniversaire, and fourth in the Trophée de la Maison Royale. Back in Algeria it was time for the national road cycling championships again. This time Lagab took the national title on the road race arriving first at the finish in Chlef. He went on to take part in the 2010 Arab Cycling Championships in Tunis where he took the silver medal in the individual time trial event. A bronze medal was added in the same discipline at the African Cycling Championships that were held in Kigali. There he also finished fourth in the team time trial (with Abdelmalek Madani and Hichem Chabane) and sixth in the road race.

=== 2011 ===
A newly set up UCI Continental Team in Algeria called Groupement Sportif Pétrolier Algérie contracted Lagab for the 2011 season, giving his career a new lift. It turned out to be the best year of his career until then and he became the best scoring rider on the team. It took however until April to book his first notable result with a second place in the Challenges Phosphatiers I (also named Challenge Khouribga). Approximately a month later his first win of the season was clinched as he took the first place in the Trophée Princier of the Challenges du Prince. In the Trophée Fédéral he won the first stage in Tiaret and became second in the second stage. This in combination with the results in the other stages gave him the win in the general classification as well. In Birtouta Lagab took the national title in the individual time trial championship, while he became second in the road race championship that was held in Ouled Fayet. A great achievement followed in the Tour d'Algerie where he won the second stage after finishing third in the first stage. He then received the leader's jersey after that stage and wore it for the remaining stages until he crossed the finish line of the fifth stage in Chrea to add another win to his palmares. This win was followed by another win in the Circuit d'Alger.

2011 continued with the 16th place in the Tour of Eritrea in preparation for the 2011 All-Africa Games that were held in Maputo. In the capital of Mozambique he finished in the fifth position of the road race, and he won the bronze medal at the individual time trial. His combined results of the year until then gave him an honorable third position in the 2011 UCI Africa Tour rankings. Lagab himself was not ready to finish 2011 yet and went on to win stage two and stage 5 of the Tour du Faso. Then in Eritrea he finished 4th in the team time trial of the 2011 African Cycling Championships alongside Abdelbasset Hannachi, Abderrahman Bourezza and Abdelmalek Madani. He also finished fourth in the individual time trial and 14th in the road race of the same Championships held in Asmara. After the Championships he won the Ouverture Saison de l'Algérie before heading to his next Championships, the 2011 Pan Arab Games in Doha. In the Qatari capital he won three medals for Algeria. A bronze medal in the individual time trial and team trial (with Abdalla Ben Youcef, Abdelmalek Madani and Abderrahman Bourezza), as well as the silver medal in the road race. Algeria ended up being the first country to arrive at the finish with three riders (the others being Abdelmalek Madani and Youcef Reguigui), which brought Lagab and his teammates the gold medal in the team road race event.

=== 2012 ===
In 2012 Lagab was still contracted to the Groupement Sportif Pétrolier Algérie team. He won the fifth stage of the Tour d'Algerie and got to the seventh position in the general classification. In the Tour du Maroc he finished in 14th position overall, while during La Tropicale Amissa Bongo he rode to a ninth position in the general classifications. At the second stage of the Tour of Eritrea he finished in third position. In June, he won another gold medal at the national road cycling championships, winning the individual time trial in Souk Ahras.

== Major results ==
2007
2nd Time trial, National Road Championships
2008
National Road Championships

1st Time trial
1st Road race

1st Grand Prix de la ville de Tunis
1st Grand Prix de la Banque de l'Habitat
2009
1st Overall Tour d'Alger

1st Stage 3

2nd Time trial, Arab Road Championships
2nd Time trial, National Road Championships
3rd Overall Tour de Wilaya de Tipaza
3rd Ouverture Saison de l'Algérie
7th Overall International Presidency Tour
8th Overall Tour de Singkarak
2010
National Road Championships

1st Road race
3rd Time trial

1st Oued Al Alleug
1st Stage 1 Tour de Wilaya de Tipaza
2nd Time trial, Arab Road Championships
Challenge du Prince

2nd Trophée de l'Anniversaire
3rd Trophée Princier
4th Trophée de la Maison Royale

African Road Championships

3rd Time trial
6th Road race

3rd Overall Grand Prix International d'Alger

1st Stages 1 & 3

2011
National Road Championships

1st Time trial
2nd Road race

Pan Arab Games

1st Team road race
2nd Road race
3rd Team time trial
3rd Time trial

1st Overall Trophée Fédéral

1st Stage 1

1st Overall Tour d'Algérie

1st Stage 2

Challenge du Prince

1st Trophée Princier
6th Trophée de la Maison Royale

1st Circuit d'Alger
1st Ouverture Saison de l'Algérie
Tour du Faso

1st Stages 2 & 5

Challenge des phosphates

2nd Challenge Khouribga
10th Challenge Youssoufia

3rd Overall 2010–11 UCI Africa Tour
All-Africa Games

3rd Time trial
5th Road race

4th Time trial, African Road Championships
2012
National Road Championships

1st Time trial
1st Road race

2nd Overall Kwita Izina Cycling Tour

1st Mountains classification
1st Stage 1

3rd Overall Tour of Eritrea
Challenge du Prince

5th Trophée Princier
9th Trophée de la Maison Royale

Challenge des phosphates

6th Challenge Khouribga
10th Challenge Ben Guerir

7th Overall Tour d'Algérie

1st Stage 5

9th Overall La Tropicale Amissa Bongo
2013
Challenge Spécial Ramadan

1st Stages 3 & 4

African Road Championships

2nd Team time trial
5th Time trial
7th Road race

2nd Circuit d'Alger
3rd Time trial, National Road Championships
5th Overall Fenkil Northern Red Sea Challenge
5th Asmara Circuit
6th Overall La Tropicale Amissa Bongo
6th Trophée de la Maison Royale, Challenge du Prince
7th Overall Tour of Eritrea
8th Overall Tour de Tipaza
8th Overall Tour de Blida
10th Overall Tour of Rwanda

1st Stages 5 & 7

2014
National Road Championships

1st Time trial
2nd Road race

1st Overall Tour of Al Zubarah

1st Stage 1

1st Circuit d'Alger
1st Stage 1 Tour de Constantine
2nd Overall Tour de Blida

1st Points classification
1st Stage 1

4th Overall Tour d'Algérie
2015
1st Overall Tour d'Oranie

1st Mountains classification

1st Circuit de Constantine
2nd Team time trial, African Games
3rd Overall Tour d'Annaba

1st Stage 1

4th Overall Tour de Blida
8th Circuit d'Alger
9th Time trial, African Road Championships
10th UAE Cup
2016
1st Time trial, National Road Championships
1st Stage 10 Tour du Faso
2nd Team time trial, African Road Championships
4th Overall Tour du Sénégal

1st Stage 6

9th Circuit de Constantine
2017
National Road Championships

1st Time trial
2nd Road race

2nd Team time trial, African Road Championships
2nd Overall Tour de Blida
9th Overall Tour de Tunisie
2018
1st Time trial, National Road Championships
1st Overall Tour d'Algérie
African Road Championships

3rd Road race
3rd Team time trial
7th Time trial

3rd Overall Tour International de la Wilaya d'Oran
4th Overall Tour of Rwanda

1st Stages 1 & 8

2019
1st Overall Grand Prix Chantal Biya

1st Stage 1

African Road Championships

2nd Road race
7th Time trial

2nd Time trial, Arab Road Championships
2nd Time trial, National Road Championships
African Games

4th Team time trial
9th Time trial

6th Overall Tour of Mesopotamia
9th Trophée de la Maison Royale, Challenge du Prince
2020
9th Overall La Tropicale Amissa Bongo
2021
National Road Championships

1st Time trial
1st Road race

1st Grand Prix Velo Erciyes
African Road Championships

3rd Team time trial
6th Road race
9th Time trial

4th Overall Tour du Faso
2022
1st Time trial, National Road Championships
African Road Championships

3rd Team time trial
9th Road race

4th Overall Grand Prix Chantal Biya

1st Mountains classification

Islamic Solidarity Games

4th Time trial
6th Road race

7th Grand Prix Kapuzbaşı
8th Grand Prix Cappadocia
2023
1st Team time trial, African Road Championships
1st Overall Tour International des Zibans

1st Stage 1

1st Grand Prix de la Ville d'Oran
1st Mountains classification, Tour of Yiğido
1st Stage 4 La Tropicale Amissa Bongo
Arab Road Championships

2nd Time trial
3rd Team time trial
9th Road race

8th Overall Grand Prix Chantal Biya
8th Overall Tour of Salalah
2024
National Road Championships

1st Road race
1st Time trial

2nd Overall Tour du Bénin

1st Stage 1

3rd Overall Tour of Salalah
African Games

4th Road race
8th Time trial

4th Overall Grand Prix Chantal Biya
5th Overall Tour d'Algérie
7th Grand Prix d'Ongola
2025
1st Time trial, National Road Championships
1st Overall Tour National de Sidi bel Abbes

1st Stage 3

1st Grand Prix Sonatrach
1st Stage 6 Challenge Ramadan
8th Grand Prix Kahramanmaraş
10th Overall Tour of Bostonliq
10th Grand Prix Edebiyat Yolu
