= List of 2016 UCI Professional Continental and Continental teams =

The Union Cycliste Internationale (UCI), the governing body of cycling, categorises teams into three divisions. The top 18 teams are the UCI WorldTeams and compete in the UCI World Tour. The second and third divisions respectively are the Professional Continental teams and the Continental teams.

The teams compete in the UCI Continental Circuits, which are divided into five continental zones: Africa, America, Asia, Europe and Oceania. They also win points in the UCI World Ranking. Professional Continental teams are also invited to participate in events in the UCI World Tour, although they are not eligible to win points in the World Tour rankings.

== UCI Professional Continental teams ==
According to the UCI Rulebook,

"a professional continental team is an organisation created to take part in road events open to professional continental teams. It is known by a unique name and registered with the UCI in accordance with the provisions below.

- The professional continental team comprises all the riders registered with the UCI as members of the team, the paying agent, the sponsors and all other persons contracted by the paying agent and/or the sponsors to provide for the continuing operation of the team (manager, team manager, coach, paramedical assistant, mechanic, etc.).
- Each professional continental team must employ at least 14 riders, 2 team managers and 3 other staff (paramedical assistants, mechanics, etc.) on a full time basis for the whole registration year."

=== List of 2016 UCI Africa Tour professional teams ===
Code	Official Team Name	Country
No registered teams

=== List of 2016 UCI America Tour professional teams ===
Code	Official Team Name	Country
FSC	Funvic Soul Cycles–Carrefour	Brazil
TNN	Team Novo Nordisk	United States
UHC	UnitedHealthcare	United States

=== List of 2016 UCI Asia Tour professional teams ===
Code	Official Team Name	Country
No registered teams

=== List of 2016 UCI Europe Tour professional teams ===
Code	Official Team Name	Country
AND	Androni Giocattoli–Sidermec	Italy
BAR	Bardiani–CSF	Italy
BOA	Bora–Argon 18	Germany
CJR	Caja Rural–Seguros RGA	Spain
CCC	CCC–Sprandi–Polkowice	Poland
COF	Cofidis	France
DMP	Delko–Marseille Provence KTM	France
DEN	Direct Énergie	France
FVC	Fortuneo–Vital Concept	France
RVL	Gazprom–RusVelo	Russia
NIP	Nippo–Vini Fantini	Italy
ONE	ONE Pro Cycling	United Kingdom
ROO	Roompot–Oranje Peloton	Netherlands
STH	Southeast–Venezuela (Note: In May 2016, Southeast–Venezuela changed its name to Wilier Triestina–Southeast.)	Italy
SSG	Stölting Service Group	Germany
ROT	Team Roth	Switzerland
TSV	Topsport Vlaanderen–Baloise	Belgium
VAT	Verva ActiveJet	Poland
WGG	Wanty–Groupe Gobert	Belgium

=== List of 2016 UCI Oceania Tour professional teams ===
Code	Official Team Name	Country
DPC	Drapac Professional Cycling	Australia

== UCI Continental teams ==
According to the UCI Rulebook, "a UCI continental team is a team of road riders recognised and licensed to take part in events on the continental calendars by the national federation of the nationality of the majority of its riders and registered with the UCI. The precise structure (legal and financial status, registration, guarantees, standard contract, etc.) of these teams shall be determined by the regulations of the national federation."

=== List of 2016 UCI Africa Tour teams ===
Code	Official Team Name	Country
DDC	Dimension Data for Qhubeka	South Africa
KRD	Kenyan Riders Downunder	Kenya

=== List of 2016 UCI America Tour teams ===
Code	Official Team Name	Country
LMC	Los Matanceros	Argentina
SEP	Sindicato de Empleados Publicos de San Juan	Argentina
SLT	San Luis Somos Todos	Argentina
GQC	Garneau–Québecor	Canada
HRB	H&R Block Pro Cycling	Canada
SPC	Silber Pro Cycling Team	Canada
BRC	Boyacá Raza de Campeones	Colombia
EPM	EPM–UNE–Área Metropolitana	Colombia
GWS	GW–Shimano	Colombia
MZN	Team Manzana Postobón	Colombia
MOT	Movistar Team América	Colombia
SCQ	Strongman–Campagnolo–Wilier	Colombia
CEE	Coopenae–Extralum	Costa Rica
DCT	Inteja–MMR Dominican Cycling Team	Dominican Republic
ECU	Team Ecuador	Ecuador
VIV	Vivo Team Grupo Oresy	Paraguay
ACT	Astellas	United States
AHB	Axeon–Hagens Berman	United States
CPC	Cylance Pro Cycling	United States
ELV	Elevate Pro Cycling–Bicycle World	United States
HSD	Holowesko Citadel Racing Team	United States
ILU	Team Illuminate	United States
JAM	Team Jamis	United States
JBC	Jelly Belly–Maxxis	United States
LRT	Lupus Racing Team	United States
RLY	Rally Cycling	United States

=== List of 2016 UCI Asia Tour teams ===
Code	Official Team Name	Country
IAT	Beijing XDS–Innova Cycling Team	China
GTQ	China Continental Team of Gansu Bank	China
YDL	China Hainan Sports Lottery–Yindongli	China
MSS	Giant–Champion System	China
HBR	Holy Brother	China
HYS	Hy Sport–Look Continental	China
JLS	Hainan Jilun Shakeland Cycling Team	China
LSL	Team Lvshan Landscape	China
NFC	Ningxia Sports Lottery–Livall Cycling Team	China
TYD	Qinghai Tianyoude Cycling Team	China
QTV	Qinghai Tianyoude Cycling Team	China
HEN	Wisdom–Hengxiang Cycling Team	China
HKS	HKSI Pro Cycling Team	Hong Kong
PCT	Pegasus Continental Cycling Team	Indonesia
PKY	Pishgaman–Giant	Iran
TPT	Tabriz Petrochemical CCN Team	Iran
TST	Tabriz Shahrdari Team	Iran
AIS	Aisan Racing Team	Japan
BGT	Bridgestone–Anchor	Japan
BLZ	Utsunomiya Blitzen	Japan
GRF	Gunma–Grifin Racing Team	Japan
KIN	Kinan Cycling Team	Japan
MTR	Matrix Powertag	Japan
NAS	Nasu Blasen	Japan
SMN	Shimano Racing Team	Japan
UKO	Team Ukyo	Japan
TSE	Astana City	Kazakhstan
V4E	Vino 4ever SKO	Kazakhstan
GIC	Geumsan Insam Cello	South Korea
KCT	Korail Cycling Team	South Korea
KSP	KSPO	South Korea
LXC	LX–IIBS Cycling Team	South Korea
SCT	Seoul Cycling Team	South Korea
KCP	Massi–Kuwait Cycling Project	Kuwait
BIC	Black Inc	Laos
NSC	NSC–Mycron	Malaysia
TSG	Terengganu Cycling Team	Malaysia
7ES	7 Eleven–Sava RBP	Philippines
ACY	Action Cycling Team	Taiwan
ATG	Attaque Team Gusto	Taiwan
RTS	RTS–Santic Racing Team	Taiwan
MPC	Al Marakeb Cycling Team	United Arab Emirates
ANS	Al Nasr Pro Cycling Team–Dubai	United Arab Emirates
SHJ	Sharjah Team	United Arab Emirates
SKD	Skydive Dubai–Al Ahli	United Arab Emirates

=== List of 2016 UCI Europe Tour teams ===
Code	Official Team Name	Country
AMP	Amplatz–BMC	Austria
HAC	Hrinkow Advarics Cycleangteam	Austria
RSW	Team Felbermayr–Simplon Wels	Austria
TIR	Tirol Cycling Team	Austria
VOL	Team Vorarlberg	Austria
WSA	WSA–Greenlife	Austria
BCP	Synergy Baku	Azerbaijan
BOC	Beobank–Corendon	Belgium
CCA	Color Code–Arden'Beef	Belgium
CIB	Cibel–Cebon	Belgium
CRV	Crelan–Vastgoedservice	Belgium
ERA	ERA Real Estate–Circus	Belgium
MMM	Team3M	Belgium
MNG	Marlux–Napoleon Games	Belgium
PCW	T.Palm–Pôle Continental Wallon	Belgium
SHI	Superano Ham–Isorex	Belgium
TFC	Telenet–Fidea Lions	Belgium
VER	Veranclassic–Ago	Belgium
VWT	Verandas Willems	Belgium
WBC	Wallonie-Bruxelles–Group Protect	Belgium
MCC	Minsk Cycling Club	Belarus
MKT	Meridiana–Kamen	Croatia
ADP	Team Dukla Praha	Czech Republic
ASP	AC Sparta Praha	Czech Republic
KLC	Klein Constantia	Czech Republic
PFG	CK Příbram Fany Gastro	Czech Republic
SKC	SKC TUFO Prostějov	Czech Republic
WHI	Whirlpool–Author	Czech Republic
ABB	Team Almeborg–Bornholm	Denmark
GSU	Team Giant Scatto	Denmark
RIW	Riwal Platform	Denmark
TCQ	Team ColoQuick–Cult	Denmark
TSO	Team Soigneur–Copenhagen	Denmark
TTF	Team Virtu Pro–Véloconcept	Denmark
BUR	Burgos BH	Spain
EUS	Euskadi Basque Country–Murias	Spain
ADT	Armée de Terre	France
AUB	HP BTP–Auber93	France
RML	Roubaix–Métropole Européenne de Lille	France
JLT	JLT–Condor	Great Britain
MGT	Madison Genesis	Great Britain
NPC	NFTO	Great Britain
PHE	Pedal Heaven	Great Britain
RAL	Team Raleigh–GAC	Great Britain
WGN	WIGGINS	Great Britain
BAI	Stradalli–Bike Aid	Germany
LKT	LKT Team Brandenburg	Germany
CJC	Christina Jewelry Pro Cycling	Germany
RNR	Rad-Net Rose Team	Germany
SVL	Team Sauerland NRW p/b Henley & Partners	Germany
THF	Team Heizomat	Germany
TKG	Team Kuota–Lotto	Germany
SKT	An Post–Chain Reaction	Ireland
CAT	Cycling Academy	Israel
AZT	D'Amico–Bottecchia	Italy
GME	GM Europa Ovini	Italy
NMG	Norda–MG.K Vis Vega	Italy
UNI	Unieuro–Wilier	Italy
ALB	Alpha Baltic–Maratoni.lv	Latvia
RBD	Rietumu–Delfin	Latvia
SBT	Staki–Baltik Vairas	Lithuania
CCD	Differdange–Losch	Luxembourg
LPC	Leopard Pro Cycling	Luxembourg
BBD	Baby-Dump Cyclingteam	Netherlands
CJP	Cyclingteam Jo Piels	Netherlands
MET	Metec–TKH	Netherlands
PVC	Parkhotel Valkenburg Continental Team	Netherlands
RDT	Rabobank Development Team	Netherlands
RIJ	Cyclingteam Join-S–De Rijke	Netherlands
SEG	SEG Racing Academy	Netherlands
COH	Team Coop–Øster Hus	Norway
FIX	Team FixIT.no	Norway
KRA	Team Ringeriks–Kraft	Norway
TJO	Team Joker Byggtorget	Norway
TSS	Team Sparebanken Sør	Norway
D2B	Domin Sport	Poland
WIB	Wibatech–Fuji	Poland
EFP	Efapel	Portugal
LAA	LA Alumínios–Antarte	Portugal
LHL	Louletano–Hospital de Loulé	Portugal
RPB	Rádio Popular–Boavista	Portugal
TAV	Sporting / Tavira	Portugal
W52	W52 / FC Porto / Porto Canal	Portugal
TCT	Tuşnad Cycling Team	Romania
LOK	Lokosphinx	Russia
ADR	Adria Mobil	Slovenia
RAR	Radenska–Ljubljana	Slovenia
DAG	Dare Gobik	Serbia
STF	Start–Vaxes Cycling Team	Serbia
DKB	Dukla Banská Bystrica	Slovakia
BLI	Team Bliz–Merida	Sweden
TTB	Team Tre Berg–Bianchi	Sweden
TRK	Torku Şekerspor	Turkey
AMO	Amore & Vita–Selle SMP	Ukraine
ISD	ISD–Jorbi	Ukraine
KLS	Kolss BDC Team	Ukraine

=== List of 2016 UCI Oceania Tour teams ===
Code	Official Team Name	Country
AIW	Avanti IsoWhey Sports	Australia
DSR	Data#3–Cisco Racing Team p/b Scody	Australia
SVR	Satalyst Verve Racing Team	Australia
SOM	State of Matter MAAP Racing	Australia
STG	St George Merida Cycling Team	Australia

Preceded by 2015	List of UCI Professional Continental and Continental teams 2016	Succeeded by 2017
