= Tomas Vaitkus =

Lithuanian cyclist (born 1982)

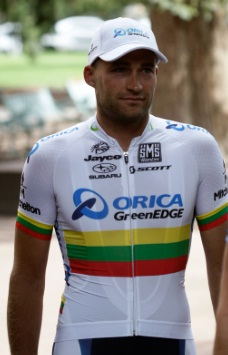
- Vaitkus at the 2013 Tour of Utah.

Personal information
- Full name: Tomas Vaitkus
- Nicknames: Tomas the Tank Engine, Tomas ‘Aventador’ Vaitkus
- Born: 4 February 1982 (age 44) Klaipėda, Lithuania

Cycling career
- Sport: Cycling
- Current team: Retired
- Discipline: Road
- Role: Rider

Professional teams
- 2003–2004: Landbouwkrediet–Colnago
- 2005–2006: AG2R Prévoyance
- 2007: Discovery Channel
- 2008–2009: Astana
- 2010: Team RadioShack
- 2011: Astana
- 2012–2013: GreenEDGE
- 2015: Rietumu–Delfin
- 2016: Al Nasr Pro Cycling Team–Dubai
- 2017: Rietumu Banka–Riga

Major wins
- Grand Tours Giro d'Italia 1 individual stage (2006) One-Day Races and Classics National Road Race Championships (2004, 2008, 2013) National Time Trial Championships (2003, 2004) Under-23 World Time Trial Championships (2002)

Tomas Vaitkus (born 4 February 1982) is a Lithuanian professional road racing cyclist riding for UCI Continental team Rietumu Banka–Riga. Vaitkus, nicknamed Tomas the Tank Engine, made his Tour de France debut in the 2007 edition but had to abandon after a serious crash at the end of stage two. Team RadioShack announced that he would be joining the team in 2010. He rejoined Astana in 2011. On 29 August 2011, it was announced that Vaitkus would join GreenEDGE for its inaugural season in 2012.

== Major results ==
2000
World Junior Track Championships

1st Team pursuit
2nd Individual pursuit

2001
European Under-23 Track Championships

2nd Team pursuit
3rd Individual pursuit

2002
1st Time trial, UCI Road World Under-23 Championships
2003
1st National Time Trial Championships
1st Stage 5 Danmark Rundt
2004
1st National Road Race Championships
1st National Time Trial Championships
1st Stage 5 Danmark Rundt
2005
1st Grand Prix Ühispanga Tartu
2nd Scheldeprijs
4th Overall Danmark Rundt
2006
1st Stage 9 Giro d'Italia
2007
3rd Overall Volta ao Algarve
6th Tour of Flanders
2008
1st National Road Race Championships
1st Ronde van het Groene Hart
2nd Trofeo Calvià
3rd Overall Volta ao Algarve

1st Stage 2

6th Trofeo Cala Millor
8th Overall Volta ao Distrito de Santarém
2011
9th Overall Three Days of De Panne
2013
1st National Road Race Championships
1st Stage 5 Tour de Azerbaijan
2015
1st Vilnius Velomarathon
10th Overall Tour of Taihu Lake
2016
1st Overall Tour de Constantine
1st Grand Prix de la Ville d'Oran
2nd National Road Race Championships
3rd Overall Tour International de Sétif

1st Points classification
1st Stages 1 & 4

3rd Overall Tour Internationale d'Oranie

1st Points classification
1st Stage 1

4th Critérium International de Sétif
