= Karim Hadjbouzit =

Algerian cyclist

Personal information
- Full name: Abderrahmane Karim Hadjbouzit
- Born: 10 February 1991 (age 35) Algeria

Cycling career
- Sport: Cycling
- Current team: Groupement Sportif des Pétroliers
- Discipline: Road
- Role: Rider

Amateur teams
- 2016: Vélo Club Sovac
- 2019: Groupement Sportif des Pétroliers d'Algérie

Professional teams
- 2012–2015: Vélo Club Sovac Algérie
- 2018: Groupement Sportif des Pétroliers d'Algérie
- 2020–: Groupement Sportif des Pétroliers

Abderrahmane Karim Hadjbouzit (born 10 February 1991) is an Algerian racing cyclist, who currently rides for UCI Continental team Groupement Sportif des Pétroliers. He rode at the 2013 UCI Road World Championships.
