= Jesús Rubio =

Jesús Rubio may refer to:

- Jesús Rubio (footballer, born 1994), Andorran football player
- Jesús Rubio (footballer, born 1996), Mexican football player
- Jesús Alberto Rubio (born 1992), Spanish cyclist
- Jesús González Rubio (died 1874), Mexican musician
- Jesús Rubio (footballer, born 1987), Spanish football player
