= Jesús Alberto Rubio =

Spanish cyclist

Personal information
- Full name: Jesús Alberto Rubio Arribas
- Born: 25 January 1992 (age 34) Tomelloso, Spain

Cycling career
- Sport: Cycling
- Discipline: Road
- Role: Rider

Amateur teams
- 2011–2012: Andalucía–Caja Granada amateur
- 2013–2015: Caja Rural–Seguros RGA amateur
- 2017: Controlpack–Badia Hortofruits

Professional teams
- 2012: Andalucía (stagiaire)
- 2014: Caja Rural–Seguros RGA (stagiaire)
- 2016: Al Nasr Pro Cycling Team–Dubai
- 2017–2018: Inteja Dominican Cycling Team
- 2019: Guerciotti–Kiwi Atlantico

Jesús Alberto Rubio Arribas (born 25 January 1992 in Tomelloso) is a Spanish cyclist, who last rode for UCI Continental team Guerciotti–Kiwi Atlantico.

== Major results ==
2016
1st Circuit d'Alger
2nd Overall Tour de Constantine

1st Stage 2

2nd Critérium International d'Alger
7th Overall Tour Internationale d'Annaba
