= Abdellah Benyoucef =

Algerian cyclist

Personal information
- Full name: Abdellah Benyoucef
- Born: 10 April 1987 (age 39) Blida, Algeria

Cycling career
- Sport: Cycling
- Current team: Madar Pro Cycling Team
- Discipline: Road
- Role: Rider

Amateur teams
- 2016: Groupement Sportif des Pétroliers d'Algérie
- 2017: Naturablue
- 2019: Groupement Sportif des Pétroliers d'Algérie
- 2021–2022: Groupement Sportif des Pétroliers
- 2023–2025: Mouloudia Club d'Alger

Professional teams
- 2008: Team Konica Minolta–Bizhub
- 2011–2015: Groupement Sportif Pétrolier Algérie
- 2018: Groupement Sportif des Pétroliers d'Algérie
- 2020: Groupement Sportif des Pétroliers
- 2025–: Madar Pro Cycling Team

Abdellah Benyoucef (born 10 April 1987) is an Algerian cyclist, who currently rides for UCI Continental team Madar Pro Cycling Team.

== Major results ==
2007
1st Stage 7 Tour de la Pharmacie Centrale
2011
2nd Challenge Ben Guerir, Challenge des phosphates
3rd Road race, National Road Championships
7th Road race, African Road Championships
2012
Challenge des phosphates

1st Challenge Ben Guerir
10th Challenge Khouribga

2013
1st Circuit of Asmara
4th Road race, African Road Championships
2014
6th Critérium International d'Alger
7th Critérium International de Blida
2015
6th Critérium International de Sétif
8th Overall Tour de Constantine
8th Critérium International de Blida
2016
1st Overall Tour du Sénégal

1st Stage 2

5th Overall Tour de Constantine
2017
2nd Team time trial, African Road Championships
6th Overall Tour de Tunisie
2022
3rd Road race, National Road Championships
2023
1st Stage 1 Tour de Ghardaia
2024
1st Overall Grand Prix Didouche Mourad

1st Stage 2

2nd Overall Tour du Cameroun

1st Points classification
1st Stage 8

6th Grand Prix de la Ville d'Annaba
2025
1st Stage 1 Tour National de Sidi bel Abbes
10th Overall Tour du Sahel
