= Hichem Chaabane =

Algerian cyclist (born 1988)

Personal information
- Full name: Hichem Chaabane
- Born: 10 August 1988 (age 38) Blida, Algeria

Cycling career
- Sport: Cycling
- Current team: Retired
- Discipline: Road
- Role: Rider

Amateur team
- 2015: Olympique Team Algérie Tour Aglo37

Professional teams
- 2008: Team Konica Minolta–Bizhub
- 2009: MTN Cycling
- 2012–2013: Vélo Club Sovac Algérie
- 2014: Olympic Team Algérie Tour Aglo37

Hichem Chaabane (Arabic: هشام شعبان; born 10 August 1988 in Blida) is an Algerian former professional road cyclist. He represented his nation Algeria at the 2008 Summer Olympics.

== Career ==
Riding for Team Konica Minolta–Bizhub, Chaabane qualified for the Algerian squad, as a 19-year-old, in the men's road race at the 2008 Summer Olympics in Beijing by receiving a berth and finishing fourth from stage four of Giro del Capo in Cape Town, South Africa. Passing through the 161.2-kilometre (100.2-mile)km mark, Chaabane could not achieve a best possible result with a severe fatigue under Beijing's intense heat and a lapped violation, as he failed to complete a grueling race against a vast field of nearly a hundred cyclists.

Chaabane signed an annual contract with MTN Cycling pro cycling team in 2009. On that same year, he and four other international cyclists were stabbed and injured on a house robbery in Potchefstroom, losing some cash, laptops, and five cellphones from their respective belongings. When MTN Cycling folded after the 2009 season, Chaabane was left with no contract, and ultimately decided to return to Algeria as a freelance agent. In 2010, Chaabane earned his first career title in road cycling for the under-23 division at the African Championships in Tunis, Tunisia.

When he joined with Vélo Club Sovac in 2012 under a bi-annual contract, Chaabane added two more titles for an elite level at the Tour de Blida and at the Algerian Road Championships in Mostaganem.

In April 2015, it was announced that Chaabane had tested positive for two undisclosed prohibited substances and was provisionally suspended from racing.

== Major results ==
2007
5th Road race, UCI B World Championships
2008
4th Overall Giro del Capo
5th Road race, African Road Championships
2010
1st Road race, Arab Road Championships
National Road Championships

2nd Time trial
2nd Road race

2012
1st Road race, Arab Road Championships
1st Stage 4 Tour du Faso
2nd Time trial, National Road Championships
African Road Championships

3rd Team time trial
7th Road race

4th Overall Kwita Izina Cycling Tour
5th Overall Tour d'Algérie
8th Overall Tour of Greece
9th Challenge Youssoufia, Challenge des phosphates
2013
National Road Championships

1st Road race
2nd Time trial

1st Overall Tour de Blida

1st Stage 3

2nd Team time trial, African Road Championships
5th Overall Tour de Wilaya de Tipaza
8th Circuit d'Alger
9th Overall Tour of Eritrea
10th Overall Tour d'Algérie
10th Overall Tour of Iran (Azerbaijan)
10th Trophée de l'Anniversaire, Challenge du Prince
2014
2nd Grand Prix d'Oran
6th Overall Tour de Constantine

1st Mountains classification

7th Critérium International de Sétif
8th Circuit d'Alger
9th Overall Tour d'Algérie

1st Stage 5

9th Overall Tour de Blida
2015
~~1st Overall Tour d'Annaba~~

~~1st Mountains classification~~
~~1st Stage 4~~

~~1st Circuit de Constantine~~
1st Circuit d'Alger
Tour Internationale d'Oranie

1st Points classification
1st Stages 1 & 3

3rd Overall Tour de Blida

1st Stage 3

5th Team time trial, African Road Championships
