= Mekseb Debesay =

Eritrean cyclist

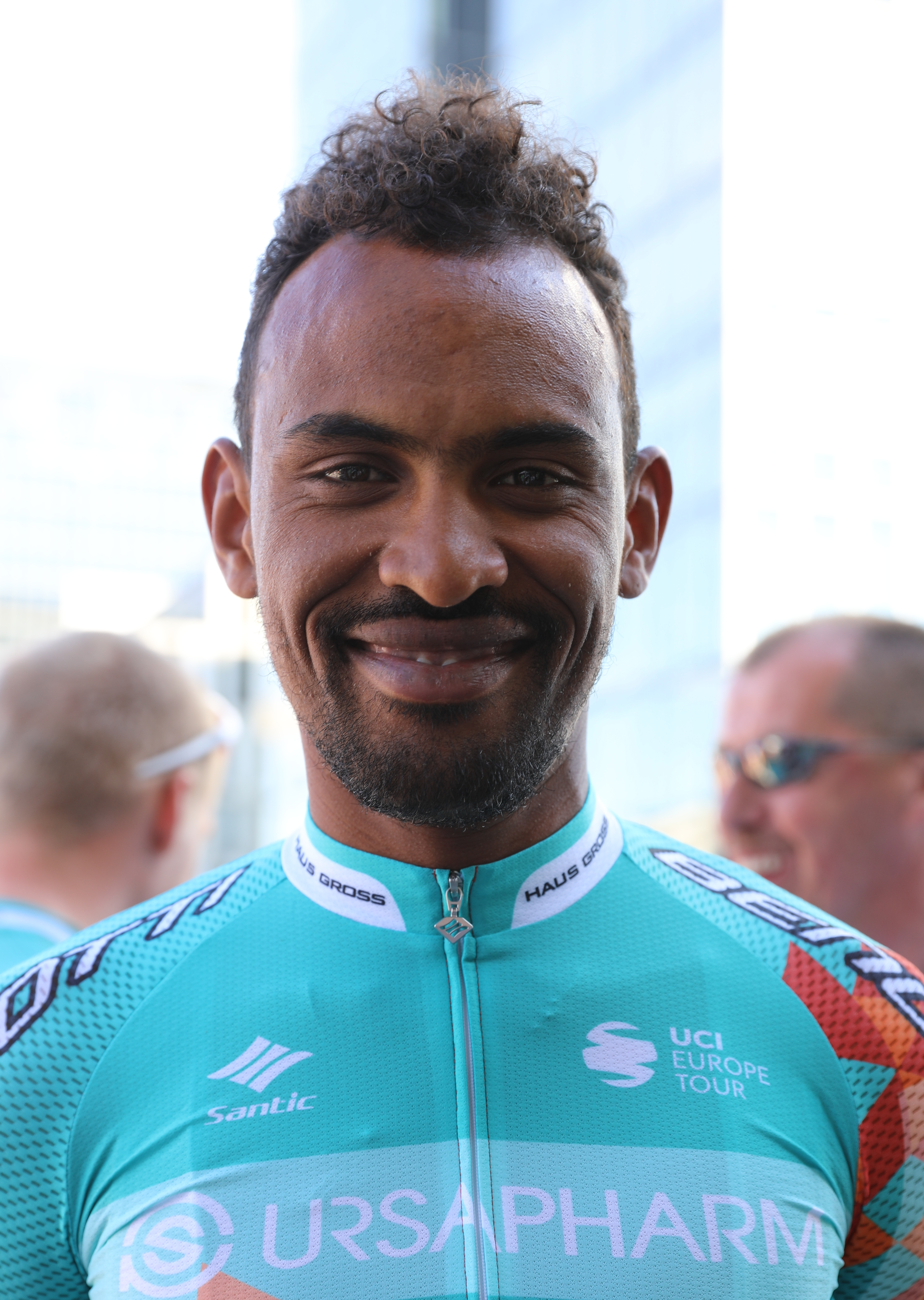
- Debesay in 2019.

Personal information
- Full name: Mekseb Debesay Abrha
- Born: 16 June 1991 (age 35) Asmara, Ethiopia
- Height: 1.82 m (6 ft 0 in)
- Weight: 64 kg (141 lb)

Cycling career
- Sport: Cycling
- Discipline: Road
- Role: Rider
- Rider type: Time trialist

Professional teams
- 2014–2015: Bike Aid–Ride for Help
- 2016–2018: Team Dimension Data
- 2019–2021: Bike Aid

Major wins
- One-day races and Classics National Time Trial Championships (2017)
Medal record
Men's road cycling
Representing Eritrea
CAC Road African Championships
Gold medal – first place	2015 Wartburg	Team time trial
Gold medal – first place	2018 Kigali	Individual time trial
Gold medal – first place	2018 Kigali	Team time trial
Gold medal – first place	2019 Bahir Dar	Road race
Gold medal – first place	2019 Bahir Dar	Team time trial

Mekseb Debesay Abrha (born 16 June 1991) is an Eritrean racing cyclist, who last rode for UCI Continental team Bike Aid. He rode at the 2014 UCI Road World Championships, as well as the 2015 UCI Road World Championships, where he was the only rider from Eritrea to compete in the men's elite road race. He won the 2014 Tour d'Algérie. He is the brother of fellow racing cyclists Mossana Debesai, Ferekalsi Debesay, Yakob Debesay and Kindishih Debesay.

== Major results ==
2011
1st Stage 5 Tour of Eritrea
2012
1st Stage 5 Tour of Eritrea
2013
1st Overall Tour of Eritrea

1st Young rider classification

3rd Overall Fenkel Northern Redsea

1st Stage 1

2014
1st Overall Tour d'Algérie

1st Points classification
1st Stage 4

1st Overall Grand Prix Chantal Biya

1st Young rider classification
1st African rider classification
1st Stage 4

Tour of Rwanda

1st Mountains classification
1st Stages 1 & 6

2nd Time trial, National Road Championships
2nd Critérium International de Sétif
2nd Critérium International de Blida
4th Overall Tour International de Sétif

1st Points classification
1st Stage 3

7th Critérium International d'Alger
8th Overall Tour de Blida
2015
1st Team time trial, African Road Championships
1st Overall Tour de Blida

1st Points classification
1st Stage 1

1st Critérium International de Sétif
Tour of Rwanda

1st Stages 1 & 4

2nd Critérium International de Blida
3rd Circuit d'Alger
6th Overall Tour International de Sétif

1st Stage 3

6th Overall Tour du Faso

1st Stage 8

10th Overall Tour International de la Wilaya d'Oran
2016
3rd Road race, African Road Championships
2017 (2 pro wins)
1st Time trial, National Road Championships
5th Overall Tour de Langkawi

1st Stage 4

10th Overall Tour of Guangxi
2018 (1)
African Road Championships

1st Team time trial
1st Time trial
4th Road race

2019 (1)
African Road Championships

1st Team time trial
1st Road race
4th Time trial

5th Time trial, National Road Championships
2021
2nd Time trial, National Road Championships
