= Reda Aadel =

Moroccan cyclist (born 1990)

Personal information
- Born: 28 December 1990 (age 35) Tétouan, Morocco

Cycling career
- Sport: Cycling
- Discipline: Road
- Role: Rider
- Rider type: Sprinter

Amateur team
- 2017: Equipe Regional du Sahara

Professional team
- 2015–2016: Al Marakeb Cycling Team

Reda Aadel (born 28 December 1990) is a Moroccan former professional cyclist who was active from 2011 to 2017. His main strength is being a sprinter. He competed for the Moroccan cycling team Maroc Régional du Sahara in 2017 and Al Marakeb Cycling Team in 2015 and 2016.

== Major results ==
2011
2nd Under-23 National Road Race Championships
6th Overall Tour d'Algérie
8th Time trial, African Road Championships
10th Trophée de la Maison Royale, Challenge du Prince
2012
Challenge du Prince

1st Trophée de l'Anniversaire
3rd Trophée de la Maison Royale

National Road Championships

4th Time trial
7th Road race

8th Overall La Tropicale Amissa Bongo
2013
National Road Championships

2nd Road race
8th Time trial

Les Challenges de la Marche Verte

2nd GP Sakia El Hamra
3rd GP Al Massira
8th GP Oued Eddahab

Challenge du Prince

8th Trophée de l'Anniversaire
10th Trophée de la Maison Royale

2014
6th GP Al Massira, Les Challenges de la Marche Verte
2015
Challenge des phosphates

3rd Grand Prix de Ben Guerir
5th Grand Prix Fkih Ben Saleh
10th Grand prix de Khouribga

2016
2nd Overall Tour de Tunisie
5th Overall Tour du Sénégal
