= Janvier Hadi =

Rwandan cyclist (born 1991)

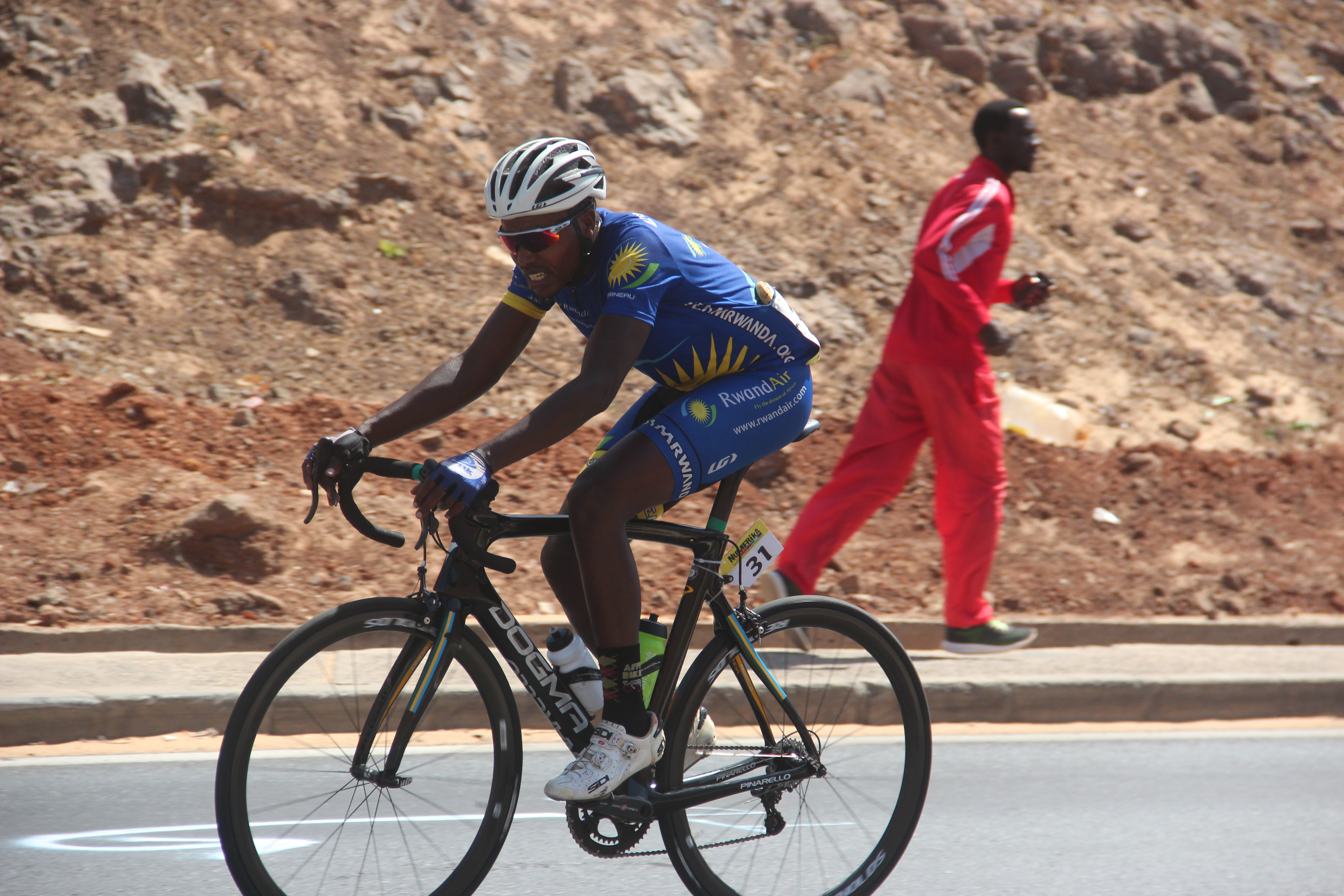
- Hadi in 2018

Personal information
- Full name: Janvier Hadi
- Born: 15 January 1991 (age 35)

Cycling career
- Sport: Cycling
- Current team: Retired
- Discipline: Road
- Role: Rider

Amateur teams
- 2014–2015: Rwanda Karisimbi
- 2018: Club Bénédiction de Rubavu

Professional teams
- 2014: Garneau–Québecor
- 2016: Stradalli–Bike Aid
Medal record
Men's cycling
Representing Rwanda
African Games
Gold medal – first place	2015 Brazzaville	Road race
Bronze medal – third place	2015 Brazzaville	Team time trial

Janvier Hadi (born 15 January 1991) is a Rwandan former cyclist, who rode professionally for the Garneau–Québecor and Stradalli–Bike Aid teams. He also represented Rwanda at the 2014 Commonwealth Games in Glasgow.

== Major results ==
2012
7th Team time trial, African Road Championships
9th Overall Kwita Izina Cycling Tour
2013
1st Prologue Tour du Rwanda
African Road Championships

3rd Under-23 road race
5th Road race
10th Time trial

2014
1st Prologue Tour du Rwanda
2nd Road race, National Road Championships
2015
African Games

1st Road race
3rd Team time trial
8th Time trial

1st Grand Prix d'Oran
Tour d'Annaba

1st Mountains classification
1st Stage 4

2nd Overall Tour de Côte d'Ivoire
4th Team time trial, African Road Championships
6th Grand Prix de Khouribga, Challenge des phosphates
9th Overall Tour de Blida
