= Cycling at the 2015 African Games =

- Location: Republic of the Congo; Brazzaville
- Dates: 10–13 September

Cycling at the 2015 African Games in Brazzaville was held between September 10–13, 2015.

== Medal summary ==
=== Medal table ===
Rank	Nation	Gold	Silver	Bronze	Total
1	Eritrea	2	1	0	3
2	South Africa	1	3	2	6
3	Nigeria	1	1	0	2
4	Rwanda	1	0	1	2
5	Mauritius	1	0	0	1
6	Algeria	0	1	2	3
7	Ethiopia	0	0	1	1
Totals (7 entries)		6	6	6	18

=== Road cycling ===
Event	Gold	Silver	Bronze
Men's road race	Janvier Hadi; Rwanda	Reynard Butler; South Africa	Adil Barbari; Algeria
Women's road race	Kimberley Le Court; Mauritius	Gladys Grikpa Tombrapa; Nigeria	Lise Olivier; South Africa
Men's time trial	Meron Teshome; Eritrea	Gustav Basson; South Africa	Adil Barbari; Algeria
Men's team time trial	South Africa; Hendrik Kruger; Gustav Basson; Shaun-Nick Bester; Reynard Butler	Algeria; Azzedine Lagab; Abderrahmane Mansouri; Abderrahmane Bechelaghem; Nassim Saidi	Rwanda; Valens Ndayisenga; Janvier Hadi; Jean Bosco Nsengimana; Joseph Areruya
Women's time trial	Mossana Debesay; Eritrea	Wehazit Kidane; Eritrea	Lise Olivier; South Africa
Women's team time trial	Nigeria; Rosemary Marcus; Gladys Grikpa Tombrapa; Happy Okafor; Glory Odiase	South Africa; Lise Olivier; Catherine Colyn; Heidi Dalton; Zanele Tshoko	Ethiopia; Gebre Tsega Beyene; Hadnet Asmelash; Tesfoam Eyeru Gebru; Sendel Hafte Tewele
