= David Williams (Canadian cyclist) =

Canadian cyclist

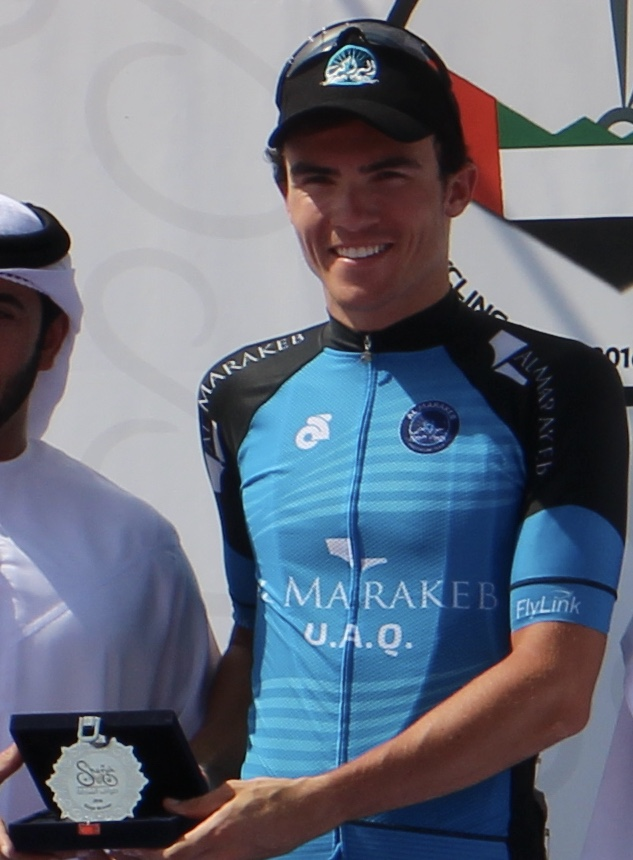
- Williams at the 2016 Sharjah International Cycling Tour

Personal information
- Full name: David Sylvestre-Williams
- Born: October 1, 1994 (age 32) Yellowknife, Northwest Territories, Canada
- Height: 184 cm (6 ft 0 in)
- Weight: 69 kg (152 lb)

Cycling career
- Sport: Cycling
- Discipline: Road
- Role: Rider
- Rider type: All-rounder

Amateur teams
- 2015, 2017: Frankie's Cycling Team–Dubai
- 2017: Verandas Willems–Crabbé–CC Chevigny
- 2018–2020: Giant–RBS

Professional teams
- 2016: Al Marakeb Cycling Team
- 2021: Yoeleo Test Team p/b 4Mind

David Sylvestre-Williams (born 1 October 1994) is a Canadian-Trinidadian former professional racing cyclist, who last rode for UCI Continental team Yoeleo Test Team p/b 4Mind. Williams turned professional on the UCI Asia Tour for Al Marakeb Cycling Team in 2016, and is the great-great-grandson of pan-Africanism human rights defender Henry Sylvester Williams.

== Major results ==
2017
1st Spinneys Dubai 92, UCI Gran Fondo World Series
2018
3rd Overall Cyprus Gran Fondo, UCI Gran Fondo World Series
