= Yonas Fissahaye =

Eritrean cyclist

Personal information
- Born: 6 January 1991 (age 35) Ethiopia

Cycling career
- Sport: Cycling
- Discipline: Road
- Role: Rider

Amateur team
- 2016: Tsinaat

Yonas Fissahaye (born 6 January 1991) is an Eritrean racing cyclist.

== Major results ==
2010
5th Overall Tour of Eritrea
2011
1st Stage 3 Tour of Eritrea
2016
1st Asmara Circuit
6th Massawa Circuit
9th Overall Tour of Eritrea
