= Mikiel Habtom =

Eritrean cyclist

Personal information
- Born: 1 January 1991 (age 35) Ethiopia

Cycling career
- Sport: Cycling
- Discipline: Road
- Role: Rider

Amateur teams
- 2016: Team Salina
- 2018: Eritel CC

Mikiel Habtom (born 1 January 1991) is an Eritrean cyclist.

== Major results ==
2015
10th Overall Tour du Faso

1st Points classification
1st Stages 3, 5 & 7

2016
1st Fenkil Northern Red Sea Challenge
3rd Road race, National Road Championships
4th Overall Tour Eritrea
2017
1st Asmara Circuit
2018
10th Overall Tour of Mediterrennean
2021
African Road Championships

1st Team time trial
2nd Mixed Relay TTT
