= Grand Prix de la ville de Tunis =

Race details
- Region: Tunis, Tunisia
- English name: Grand Prix of the city of Tunis
- Local name: Grand Prix de la ville de Tunis (in French)
- Discipline: Road
- Competition: UCI Africa Tour

History
- First edition: 2007
- Editions: 2
- Final edition: 2008

Grand Prix de la ville de Tunis (English: Grand Prize (of cycling) of the City of Tunis) is a one-day professional road bicycle racing event and sports festival established in 2007 and projected to be held annually each April in Tunis, the capital city of the Tunisian Republic. GP de la ville de Tunis is part of the UCI Africa Tour.

== Past winners ==
Year	Country	Rider	Team
2007	Tunisia	Ahmed Mraihi	
2008	Algeria	Azzedine Lagab	
