= MC Alger (cycling) =

Algerian cycling team

Mouloudia Club d'Alger
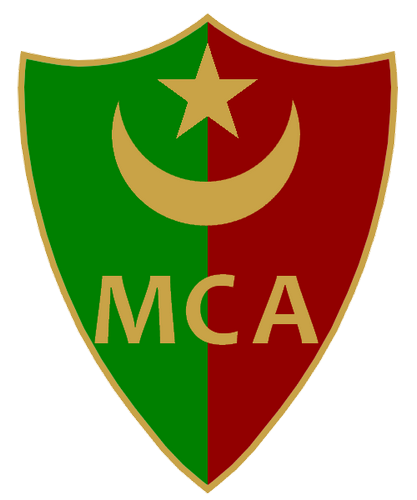

Team information
- Registered: Algeria
- Founded: 2011; 15 years ago, as GS Pétroliers
- Discipline: Road
- Status: UCI Continental (2011–2015, 2018, 2020); National (2016–2017, 2019, 2021–)

Key personnel
- General manager: Djaffar Bel Hocine

Team name history
- 2011–2013 2014–2016 2017 2018 2019–2020 2021–: Groupement Sportif Pétrolier Algérie; Groupement Sportif des Pétroliers d´Algérie; Groupement Sportif des Pétrolier; Groupement Sportif des Pétroliers Algerie; Groupement Sportif des Pétroliers; Mouloudia Club d'Alger

Mouloudia Club d'Alger (Arabic: نادي مولودية الجزائر), referred to as MC Alger or MCA for short, is an Algerian cycling team that was founded in 2011, as a division of MC Alger.

== History ==
From 2011 to 2020, the team was known as GS Pétroliers as it was part of the multi-sports club with that name.

The team's name changed back to MC Alger in 2020.

== Team roster ==
As of 09 May 2026.

Rider	Date of birth
Abderaouf Bengayou (ALG)	7 July 1998 (age 28)
Abdellah Benyoucef (ALG)	10 April 1987 (age 39)
Oussama Cheblaoui (ALG)	5 October 1999 (age 26)
Yasser Djettou (ALG)	27 August 2006 (age 20)
Ashraf Ferhat (ALG)	14 September 2004 (age 21)
Salah Hamzioui (ALG)	24 August 2007 (age 19)

Rider	Date of birth
Azzedine Lagab (ALG)	18 September 1986 (age 39)
Abderrahmane Mansouri (ALG)	13 January 1995 (age 31)
Khaled Mansouri (ALG)	5 November 2003 (age 22)
El Khacib Sassane (ALG)	4 April 1994 (age 32)
Hichem Tamazourt (ALG)	18 July 2007 (age 19)

== Major wins ==
2011
Algeria Road Race Championships, Youcef Reguigui
Algeria Time Trial Championships, Azzedine Lagab
Trophée Princier, Azzedine Lagab
Overall Tour d'Algérie, Azzedine Lagab

Stage 2, Azzedine Lagab
Stage 3, Youcef Reguigui

Circuit d'Alger, Azzedine Lagab
Stages 2 & 5 Tour du Faso Azzedine Lagab
Stage 3 Tour du Faso, Abdelmalek Madani
Stage 7 Tour du Faso, Youcef Reguigui
2012
Algeria Road Race Championships, Azzedine Lagab
Algeria Time Trial Championships, Azzedine Lagab
Stage 5 Tour d'Algérie, Azzedine Lagab
Challenge Ben Guerir, Abdellah Benyoucef
Heydar Aliyev Anniversary Tour, Youcef Reguigui
Stage 1 Kwita Izina Cycling Tour, Azzedine Lagab
2013
Stage 2 Fenkel Northern Red Sea, Abdelbasset Hannachi
Stage 3 Tour of Eritrea, Abdelbasset Hannachi
Circuit of Asmara, Abdellah Benyoucef
Stage 3 Tour d'Algérie, Abdelbasset Hannachi
Stage 2 Tour de Tipaza, Abdelbasset Hannachi
Stages 5 & 10 Tour du Faso, Abdelbasset Hannachi
Stages 5 & 7 Tour du Rwanda, Azzedine Lagab
2014
Algeria Road Race Championships, Abdelbasset Hannachi
Algeria Time Trial Championships, Azzedine Lagab
Stage 1 Tour de Blida, Azzedine Lagab
Stage 1 Tour de Constantine, Azzedine Lagab
Circuit d'Alger, Azzedine Lagab
Stage 6 Tour du Maroc, Abdelbasset Hannachi
2015
Overall Tour d'Oranie, Azzedine Lagab

Stage 2, Ayoub Karrar

Stage 2 Tour de Blida, Adil Barbari
Overall Tour d'Annaba, Abdelbasset Hannachi

Stage 1, Azzedine Lagab
Stages 2 & 3, Abdelbasset Hannachi

Stage 1 Tour de Constantine, Abdelmalek Madani
Circuit de Constantine, Azzedine Lagab
Critérium International de Blida, Abdelbasset Hannachi
Stage 2 Tour de Chlef, Abdelbasset Hannachi
2018
Stage 3 Grand Prix International de la ville d'Alger, Yacine Hamza
Overall Tour d'Algérie, Azzedine Lagab

Stage 2, Yacine Hamza

Stage 4 Tour International de la Wilaya d'Oran, Yacine Hamza
Algeria Time Trial Championships, Azzedine Lagab
Stage 1 Tour du Rwanda, Azzedine Lagab
