= Al Nasr Pro Cycling Team–Dubai =

Nasr-Dubai Pro Cycling Team
Team information
- UCI code: ANS
- Registered: Dubai, United Arab Emirates
- Founded: 2016
- Disbanded: 2016
- Discipline: Road
- Status: UCI Continental

Team name history
- 2016: Nasr-Dubai Pro Cycling Team

Nasr-Dubai Pro Cycling Team (UCI team code: ANS), formerly known as Al Nasr Pro Cycling Team – Dubai, was a men's UCI Continental cycling team, based in Dubai, United Arab Emirates. The team competed in the UCI Asia Tour. The team was developed from the club level with the intention of "developing local talent, to produce top Emirati cyclists", as Yousif Mirza said. However the team disbanded after the 2016 season.

== 2016 roster ==
As of 4 February 2016.

Rider	Date of birth
Amer Abdullah (UAE)	15 September 1993 (age 32)
Essaïd Abelouache (MAR)	20 July 1988 (age 38)
Talal Al Balooshi (UAE)	{{{birthdate}}}
Majed Albalooshi (UAE)	31 May 1987 (age 39)
Ali Alhassani (UAE)	{{{birthdate}}}
Nasser Alibrahi (KSA)	{{{birthdate}}}
Ahmed Almansory (UAE)	8 January 1990 (age 36)

Rider	Date of birth
Jaber Almansory (UAE)	9 November 1991 (age 34)
Adil Barbari (ALG)	27 May 1993 (age 33)
Sodir Shir Mohamad Khayyam (UAE)	25 December 1994 (age 31)
Yousif Mirza (UAE)	8 October 1988 (age 37)
Jesus Alberto Rubio (ESP)	25 January 1992 (age 34)
Tomas Vaitkus (LTU)	4 February 1982 (age 44)
Luca Wackermann (ITA)	13 March 1992 (age 34)

== Major wins ==
2016
Stage 3 Tour de Chlef, Adil Barbari
Memorial Manuel Sanroma, Jesus Alberto Rubio
Circuit International d'Alger, Jesus Alberto Rubio
Overall Tour d'Oranie, Luca Wackermann

Stage 1, Tomas Vaitkus
Stages 2 & 3, Luca Wackermann

Grand Prix de la Ville d'Oran, Tomas Vaitkus
Overall Tour International de Blida, Luca Wackermann

Stages 1 & 3, Luca Wackermann
Stage 2, Adil Barbari

Overall Tour International de Sétif, Essaïd Abelouache

Stages 1 & 4, Tomas Vaitkus
Stage 2, Essaïd Abelouache
Stage 3, Adil Barbari

Critérium International de Sétif, Adil Barbari
Overall Tour Internationale d'Annaba, Luca Wackermann

Stages 1 & 3, Adil Barbari
Stage 2, Luca Wackermann
Stage 4, Essaïd Abelouache

Overall Tour International de Constantine, Tomas Vaitkus

Stages 1 & 3, Adil Barbari
Stage 2, Jesus Alberto Rubio

United Arab Emirates National Road Race Championships, Yousif Mirza
United Arab Emirates National Time Trial Championships, Yousif Mirza
Stage 4 Tour d'Azerbaïdjan, Luca Wackermann

== National champions ==
2016
UAE Road Race, Yousif Mirza
UAE Time Trial, Yousif Mirza
