= Tour Meles Zenawi =

Tour Meles Zenawi for Green Development
Race details
- Date: August/September
- Discipline: Road
- Competition: UCI Africa Tour
- Type: stage race

History
- First edition: 2016
- Editions: 2 (as of 2017)
- First winner: Tedros Redae (ETH)
- Most wins: No repeat winners
- Most recent: Willie Smit (RSA)

The Tour Meles Zenawi for Green Development is a cycling race held annually in Ethiopia. It is part of UCI Africa Tour in category 2.2.

== Winners ==
Year	Country	Rider	Team
2016	Ethiopia	Tedros Redae	
2017	South Africa	Willie Smit	South Africa (national team)
