= Vélo Club Sovac =

Algerian cycling team

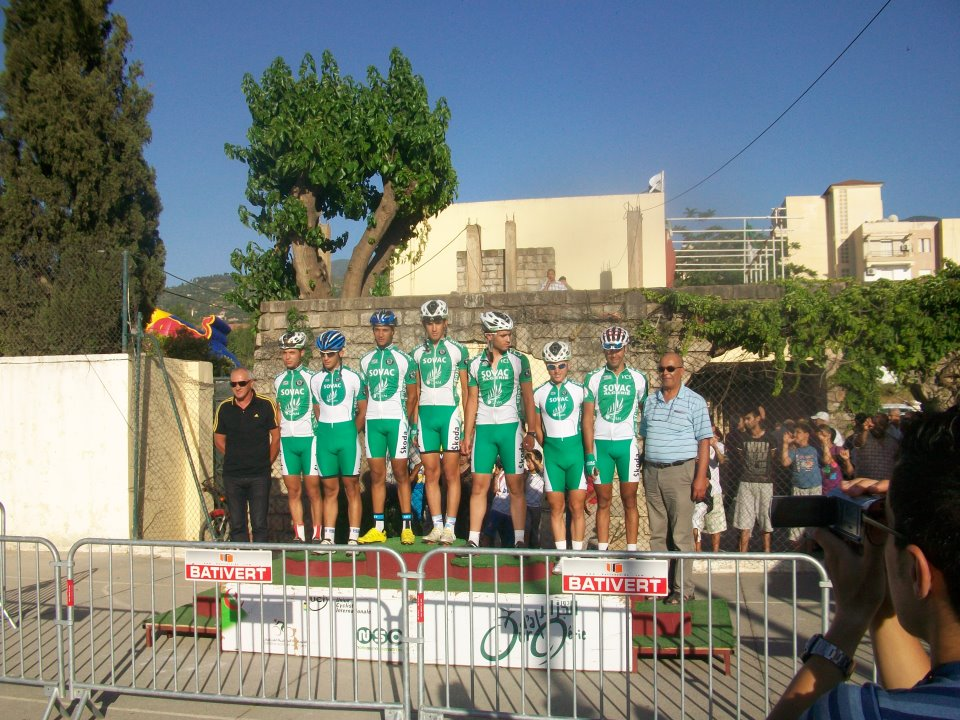

Team information
- UCI code: VCS
- Registered: Algeria
- Founded: 2012
- Disbanded: 2015
- Discipline: Road
- Status: UCI Continental

Key personnel
- General manager: Jafar Belhocine

Team name history
- 2012–2013 2014–2015: Velo Club Sovac Algerie; Velo Club Sovac

Vélo Club Sovac was a UCI Continental cycling team based in Algeria. It was founded in 2012.

== Team roster ==
Rider	Date of birth
Boualem Belmoukhtar (ALG)	March 11, 1993 (age 33)
Gaetan Bille (BEL)	April 6, 1988 (age 38)
Mohamed Bouzidi (ALG)	May 6, 1994 (age 32)
Louis Deguide (BEL)	February 4, 1994 (age 32)
Florian Deriaux (FRA)	June 5, 1990 (age 36)
Laurent Evrard (BEL)	September 22, 1990 (age 35)
Alexander Geuens (BEL)	September 5, 1994 (age 32)
Abderrahmane Mehdi Hamza (ALG)	February 19, 1992 (age 34)
Ayoub Karrar (ALG)	March 2, 1993 (age 33)

Rider	Date of birth
Matthias Legley (BEL)	January 15, 1991 (age 35)
Hamza Mansouri (ALG)	April 13, 1999 (age 27)
Islam Mansouri (ALG)	July 23, 1997 (age 29)
Hichem Mokhtari (ALG)	December 11, 1996 (age 29)
Davide Rebellin (ITA)	August 9, 1971 (age 55)
Youcef Reguigui (ALG)	January 9, 1990 (age 36)
Robin Stenuit (BEL)	June 16, 1990 (age 36)
Marco Zamparella (ITA)	October 1, 1987 (age 38)

== Major wins ==
2012
Stage 4 Tour du Faso, Hichem Chaabane
Stage 8 Tour du Faso, Fayçal Hamza
Stages 9 & 10 Tour du Faso, Adil Barbari
2013
Overall Tour de Blida, Hichem Chaabane

Stage 3, Hichem Chaabane

Algeria Road Race Championships, Hichem Chaabane
Algeria Time Trial Championships, Adil Barbari
Stages 4 & 8 Tour du Faso, Adil Barbari
2014
Stage 1 Tour d'Algérie, Adil Barbari
Grand Prix d'Oran, Adil Barbari
2015
Overall Tour International de Sétif, Nabil Baz

Stage 1, Nabil Baz

Stage 2 Tour de Constantine, Abderrahmane Mansouri
Algeria Road Race Championships, Abderrahmane Mansouri
