= Luca Wackermann =

Italian cyclist

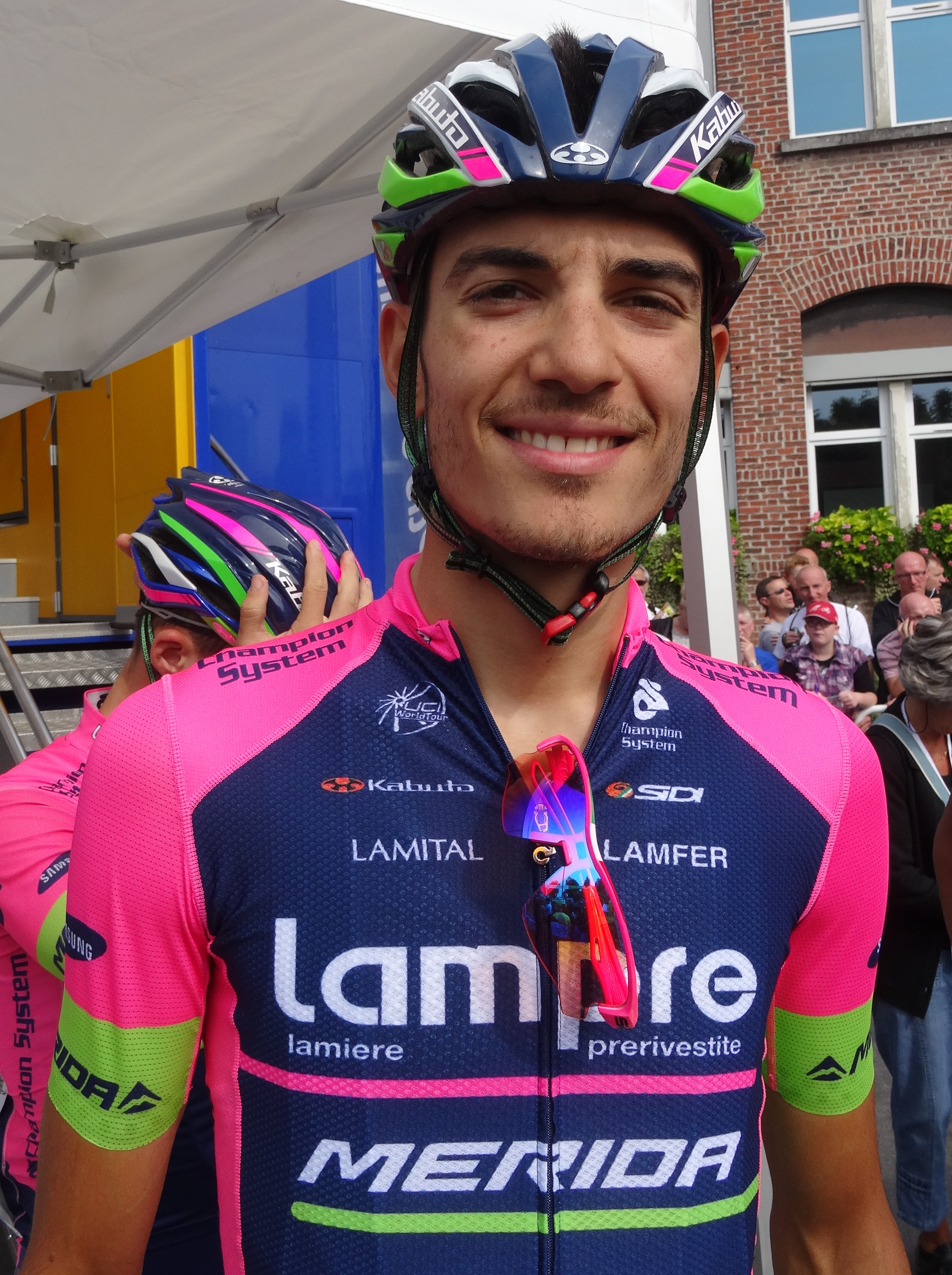
- Wackermann in 2014.

Personal information
- Full name: Luca Wackermann
- Born: 13 March 1992 (age 34) Rho, Italy
- Height: 1.88 m (6 ft 2 in)
- Weight: 68 kg (150 lb)

Cycling career
- Sport: Cycling
- Discipline: Road
- Role: Rider

Amateur team
- 2011–2012: Mastromarco–Chianti Sensi–Benedetti

Professional teams
- 2012: Lampre–ISD (stagiaire)
- 2013–2014: Lampre–Merida
- 2015: Southeast Pro Cycling
- 2016: Al Nasr Pro Cycling Team–Dubai
- 2017–2019: Bardiani–CSF
- 2020: Vini Zabù–KTM
- 2021: Eolo–Kometa

Luca Wackermann (born 13 March 1992 in Rho) is an Italian cyclist, who last rode for UCI ProTeam Team Polti VisitMalta. In October 2020, he was named in the startlist for the 2020 Giro d'Italia. However, at the end of stage 4, Wackermann was involved in a crash caused by a low-flying helicopter that blew some crash barriers into him. Wackermann suffered a broken nose and a suspected broken back in the incident.

== Major results ==
2009
1st Road race, UEC European Junior Road Championships
2010
3rd Road race, National Junior Road Championships
2012
1st Trofeo Menci Spa
2015
4th Gran Premio Industria e Commercio di Prato
2016
1st Overall Tour d'Oranie

1st Stages 2 & 3

1st Overall Tour International de Blida

1st Stages 1 & 3

1st Overall Tour Internationale d'Annaba

1st Stage 2

1st Stage 4 Tour d'Azerbaïdjan
2018
1st Stage 2 Tour du Limousin
4th Coppa Ugo Agostoni
9th Trofeo Matteotti
2019
9th Overall Tour de Luxembourg
2020
1st Overall Tour de Limousin

1st Stage 1

6th Overall Sibiu Cycling Tour

=== Grand Tour general classification results timeline ===
Grand Tour	2020
Giro d'Italia	DNF
Tour de France	—
Vuelta a España	—

Legend
—	Did not compete
DNF	Did not finish
