= Sharjah Team =

Team information
- Registered: United Arab Emirates
- Founded: 2015
- Discipline: Road
- Status: UCI Continental

Team name history
- 2015–2016, 2018: Sharjah Team

Sharjah Team is a UCI Continental team founded in 2015 and based in the UAE. It participates in UCI Continental Circuits races.

== Roster in 2018 ==
Rider	Date of birth
Essaid Abelouache (MAR)	20 July 1988 (age 38)
Mohamed Al Aali (BHR)	26 October 1997 (age 28)
Ahmed Jasim Al Ali (UAE)	29 March 1997 (age 29)
Jaber Al Mansoori (UAE)	9 November 1991 (age 34)
Oleksandr Golovash (UKR)	21 September 1991 (age 34)
Mouhssine Lahsaini (MAR)	2 February 1985 (age 41)

Rider	Date of birth
Abderrahmane Mansouri (ALG)	13 January 1995 (age 31)
Oussama Mansouri (ALG)	7 June 1996 (age 30)
Khaled Mayouf (UAE)	10 November 1994 (age 31)

== Major wins ==
2016
Stage 4 Tour Eritrea, Elyas Afewerki
Stage 1 Tour du Sénégal, Abderrahmane Mansouri
Tour de Tunisie, Abderrahmane Mansouri
2018
Stage 2 Tour International de la Wilaya d'Oran, Oleksandr Golovash

== National champions ==
2016
Algeria Road Race, Abderrahmane Mansouri
