= Asmara Circuit =

Eritrean cycling race

Race details
- Date: April (2016), February (2013)
- Region: Eritrea
- Discipline: Road
- Competition: UCI Africa Tour
- Type: One day race

History
- First edition: 2013
- Editions: 3 (as of 2017)
- First winner: Abdellah Benyoucef (ALG)
- Most wins: No repeat winners
- Most recent: Mikiel Habtom (ERI)

The Asmara Circuit (formerly Circuit of Asmara) is a one-day cycling race held annually in Asmara, Eritrea since 2013. It is rated 1.2 and is part of UCI Africa Tour.

== Winners ==
Year	Country	Rider	Team
2013	Algeria	Abdellah Benyoucef	Groupement Sportif des Pétroliers d'Algérie
2014–2015	No race		
2016	Eritrea	Yonas Fissahaye	
2017	Eritrea	Mikiel Habtom	EriTel
