= Fenkil Northern Red Sea Challenge =

Annual cycling race in Eritrea

Fenkel Northern Redsea Challenge
Race details
- Date: April (2016), February (2013)
- Discipline: Road
- Competition: UCI Africa Tour
- Type: One day race, stage race

History
- First edition: 2013
- Editions: 3 (2017)
- First winner: Tesfay Abraha (ERI)
- Most wins: No repeat winners
- Most recent: Pierpaolo Ficara (ITA)

The Fenkel Northern Redsea Challenge is a cycling race held annually in the Northern Red Sea Region, Eritrea since 2013. It was rated 2.2 in 2013 and 1.2 in 2016. The race is part of UCI Africa Tour.

== Winners ==
| Year | Country | Rider | Team |
|---|---|---|---|
| 2013 | Eritrea | Tesfay Abraha | |
| 2016 | Eritrea | Mikiel Habtom | |
| 2017 | Italy | Pierpaolo Ficara | Amore & Vita–Selle SMP |
