= Al Marakeb Cycling Team =

Team information
- UCI code: MCT
- Registered: Morocco
- Founded: 2015
- Discipline: Road
- Status: UCI Continental
- Bicycles: Wilier Triestina

Team name history
- 2015 2016: Al Marakeb Cycling Team; Al Marakeb Pro Cycling Team

Al Marakeb Cycling Team was a UCI Continental cycling team based in Morocco, founded in 2015 and disbanded in 2016. They competed on the UCI Asia Tour and UCI Africa Tour. In their second year they moved to Umm Al Quwain in the United Arab Emirates, and changed their name to Al Marakeb Pro Cycling Team.

== Team roster ==
Rider	Date of birth
Reda Aadel (MAR)	28 October 1990 (age 35)
Mohammed Almansory (UAE)	8 June 1990 (age 36)
Haitam Gaiz (MAR)	25 February 1994 (age 32)
Abdellah Hida (MAR)	1 January 1991 (age 35)

Rider	Date of birth
Hatim Karmouchi (MAR)	6 March 1992 (age 34)
David Williams (CAN)	1 October 1994 (age 31)

== Major wins ==
2015
Challenge des phosphates-Grand prix de Khouribga, Mouhssine Lahsaini
Overall Tour du Faso, Mouhssine Lahsaini
Overall Grand Prix Chantal Biya, Mouhssine Lahsaini
Overall Tour de Côte d'Ivoire, Mouhssine Lahsaini

Stage 2 (ITT), Mouhssine Lahsaini

Les Challenges de la Marche Verte, Abdelati Saadoune
2016
Criterium International d'Alger, Nassim Saidi
