= Critérium International d'Alger =

Race details
- Region: Algeria
- Discipline: Road
- Competition: UCI Africa Tour
- Type: One-day race

History
- First edition: 2014
- Editions: 2 (as of 2016)
- First winner: Thomas Rabou (NED)
- Most wins: No repeat winners
- Most recent: Nassim Saidi (ALG)

The Critérium International d'Alger is a one-day cycling race held annually in Algeria. It is part of UCI Africa Tour in category 1.2.

== Winners ==
Year	Country	Rider	Team
2014	Netherlands	Thomas Rabou	OCBC Singapore Continental
2015	No race		
2016	Algeria	Nassim Saidi	Al Marakeb Cycling Team
