= Critérium International de Blida =

Algerian one-day road cycling race

Race details
- Region: Algeria
- Discipline: Road
- Competition: UCI Africa Tour
- Type: One-day race
- Organiser: Algerian Cycling Federation

History
- First edition: 2014
- Editions: 3
- Final edition: 2016
- First winner: Marco Amicabile (ITA)
- Most wins: No repeat winners
- Final winner: Nassim Saidi (ALG)

The Critérium International de Blida was a cycling race held in Algeria, between 2014 and 2016, which was rated 1.2.

== Winners ==
Year	Country	Rider	Team
2014	Italy	Marco Amicabile	Gradnano Sporting Club
2015	Algeria	Abdelbasset Hannachi	Groupement Sportif des Pétroliers d'Algérie
2016	Algeria	Nassim Saidi	Al Marakeb Cycling Team
