= Critérium International de Sétif =

Algerian one-day road cycling race

Race details
- Date: March
- Region: Sétif Province
- Discipline: Road
- Competition: UCI Africa Tour
- Type: One-day race
- Organiser: Algerian Cycling Federation

History
- First edition: 2014
- Editions: 3
- Final edition: 2016
- First winner: Mouhssine Lahsaini (MAR)
- Most wins: No repeat winners
- Final winner: Adil Barbari (ALG)

The Critérium International de Sétif was a one-day cycling race held for three years in Algeria, between 2014 and 2016. It was held as part of the UCI Africa Tour, rated 1.2.

== Winners ==
Year	Country	Rider	Team
2014	Morocco	Mouhssine Lahsaini	
2015	Eritrea	Mekseb Debesay	Bike Aid
2016	Algeria	Adil Barbari	Al Nasr Pro Cycling Team–Dubai
