= Tour International de Sétif =

Algerian multi-day road cycling race

Race details
- Date: March
- Region: Sétif Province
- Discipline: Road
- Competition: UCI Africa Tour
- Type: Stage race

History
- First edition: 2014
- Editions: 3 (as of 2016)
- First winner: Thomas Lebas (FRA)
- Most recent: Essaïd Abelouache (MAR)

The Tour International de Sétif is a cycling race held annually since 2014 in Algeria. It is part of UCI Africa Tour and is rated a 2.2 event.

== Winners ==
Year	Country	Rider	Team
2014	France	Thomas Lebas	Bridgestone Anchor
2015	Algeria	Nabil Baz	Vélo Club Sovac
2016	Morocco	Essaïd Abelouache	Al Nasr Pro Cycling Team–Dubai
