= Circuit de Constantine =

Algerian one-day road cycling race

Race details
- Region: Algeria
- Discipline: Road
- Competition: UCI Africa Tour
- Type: One-day race

History
- First edition: 2015
- Editions: 2
- Final edition: 2016
- First winner: Azzedine Lagab (ALG)
- Most wins: No repeat winners
- Final winner: Joseph Areruya (RWA)

The Circuit de Constantine was a one-day cycling race held in 2015 and 2016 in Algeria, that was rated 1.2 and held as part of the UCI Africa Tour. Hichem Chaabane initially won the 2015 edition of the race, but tested positive for a banned substance in April 2015. As such he was stripped of the title.

== Winners ==
Year	Country	Rider	Team
2015	Algeria	Azzedine Lagab	Groupement Sportif des Pétroliers d'Algérie
2016	Rwanda	Joseph Areruya	Les Amis Sportifs de Rwamagana
