= Grand Prix d'Oran =

Algerian one-day road cycling race

GP de la Ville d'Oran
Race details
- Region: Oran, Algeria
- Discipline: Road
- Competition: UCI Africa Tour
- Type: One day race

History
- First edition: 2015
- Editions: 3 (as of 2016)
- First winner: Adil Barbari (ALG)
- Most wins: No repeat winners
- Most recent: Nassim Saidi (ALG)

The GP de la Ville d'Oran is a one-day race held annually since 2015 in Oran, Algeria, rated 1.2 and is part of UCI Africa Tour.

== Winners ==
| Year | Country | Rider | Team |
|---|---|---|---|
| 2014 | Algeria | Adil Barbari | Vélo Club Sovac |
| 2015 | Rwanda | Janvier Hadi | Team Rwanda Karisimbi |
| 2016 | Lithuania | Tomas Vaitkus | Al Nasr Pro Cycling Team–Dubai |
| 2024 | Algeria | Nassim Saidi | Madar Pro Cycling Team (Algiers) |

== See also ==
- Tour International de la Wilaya d'Oran
