= Tour d'Algérie =

Annual cycling race in Algeria

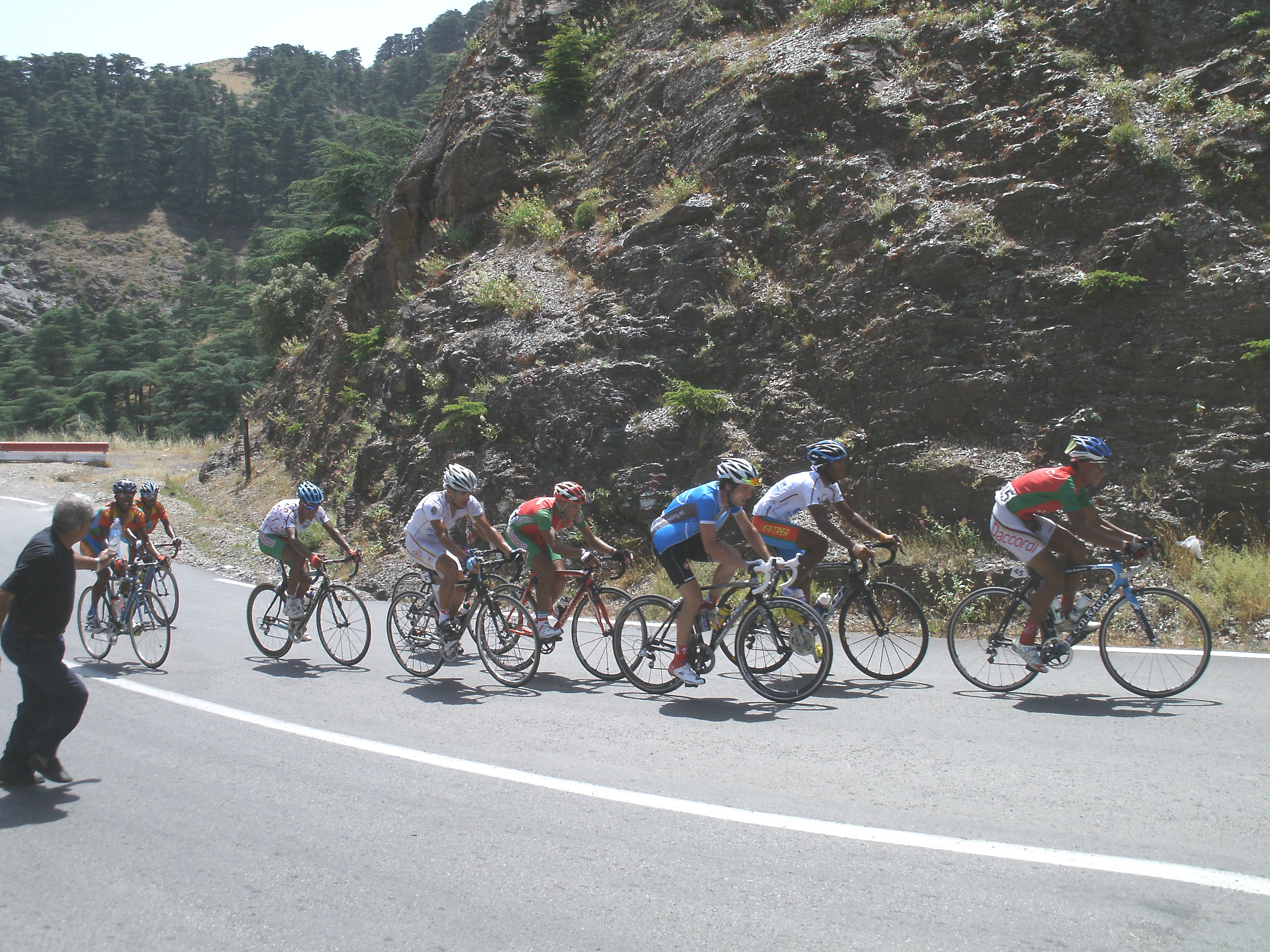
- Riders in the 2011 Tour d'Algérie.

Race details
- Discipline: Road
- Competition: UCI Africa Tour
- Type: Stage race

History
- First edition: 1949
- Editions: 32 (as of 2026)
- First winner: Hilaire Couvreur (BEL)
- Most wins: Hilaire Couvreur (BEL); Azzedine Lagab (ALG); (2 wins)
- Most recent: Dimas Nur Fadhil Rizqi (INA)

The Tour d'Algérie is an annual multi-day road cycling race held in Algeria. It has been held as a 2.2 category event on UCI Africa Tour since 2011, with the exception of 2017 and 2022 when it was held on the national calendar.

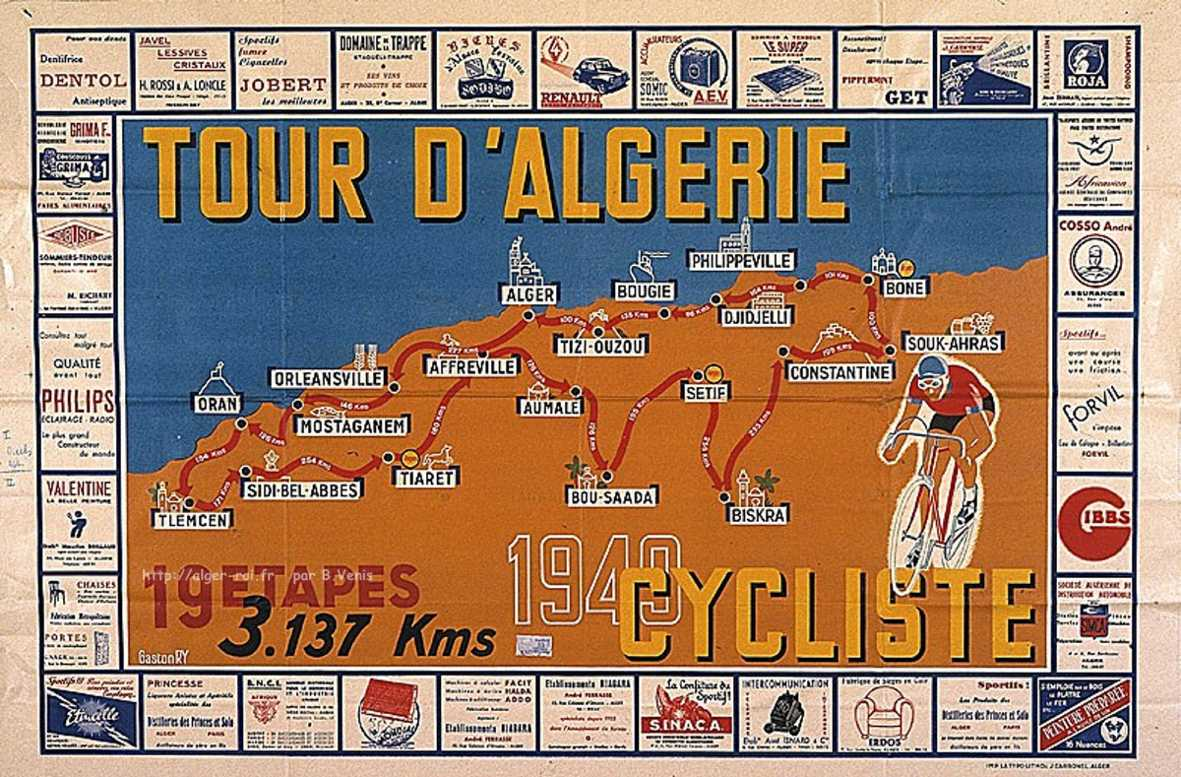
A map of the first Tour d'Algérie

== Winners ==
Year	Country	Rider	Team
1949	Belgium	Hilaire Couvreur	
1950	Belgium	Hilaire Couvreur	
1951	Belgium	André Rosseel	
1952	France	Vincent Vitetta	
1953	Belgium	Germain Derycke	
1954– 1968	No race		
1969	Sweden	Gösta Pettersson	
1970 (1)	Poland	Zygmund Hanusik	
1970 (2)	East Germany	Axel Peschel	
1971	Poland	Zbigniew Krzeszowiec	
1972	Netherlands	Frits Schur	
1973	Poland	Stanisław Szozda	
1974	No race		
1975	Sweden	Sven-Åke Nilsson	
1976– 1983	No race		
1984	Algeria	Noureddine Tchambaz	
1985	Algeria	Sebti Benzine	
1986	Algeria	Salim Belksir	
1987	Algeria	Abdelkader Reguigui	
1988	East Germany	Steffen Rein	
1989– 2000	No race		
2001	Egypt	Mohamed Abdel-Fatah	
2002	Algeria	Omar Slimane	
2003	Morocco	Mohamed Er Regragui	
2004– 2010	No race		
2011	Algeria	Azzedine Lagab	
2012	Eritrea	Natnael Berhane	
2013	Spain	Víctor de la Parte	
2014	Eritrea	Mekseb Debesay	
2015	Algeria	Hichem Chaabane	
2016	Italy	Luca Wackermann	Skydive Dubai–Al Ahli
2017	Tunisia	Ali Nouisri	
2018	Algeria	Azzedine Lagab	Groupement Sportif des Pétroliers d'Algérie
2019– 2021	No race		
2022	Algeria	Hamza Mansouri	Mouloudia Club d'Alger
2023	France	Paul Hennequin	Nice Métropole Côte d'Azur
2024	Algeria	Nassim Saidi	Madar Pro Cycling Team
2025	Algeria	Hamza Amari	Madar Pro Cycling Team
2026	Indonesia	Dimas Nur Fadhil Rizqi	Jakarta Pro Cycling Team
