= Tour d'Annaba =

Algerian multi-day road cycling race

Race details
- Region: Algeria
- Discipline: Road
- Competition: UCI Africa Tour
- Type: Stage race

History
- First edition: 2015
- Editions: 2
- Final edition: 2016
- First winner: Abdelbasset Hannachi (ALG)
- Most wins: No repeat winners
- Final winner: Luca Wackermann (ITA)

The Tour d'Annaba was a stage race held in 2015 and 2016 in Algeria, which was rated 2.2 and part of the UCI Africa Tour. Hichem Chaabane won the race in 2015 but was stripped of the title after testing positive for a banned substance in April of that year.

== Winners ==
Year	Country	Rider	Team
2015	Algeria	Abdelbasset Hannachi	Groupement Sportif des Pétroliers d'Algérie
2016	Italy	Luca Wackermann	Al Nasr Pro Cycling Team–Dubai
