= Tour International de la Wilaya d'Oran =

Algerian multi-day road cycling race

Race details
- Region: Oran Province, Algeria
- Discipline: Road
- Competition: UCI Africa Tour
- Type: Stage race

History
- First edition: 2015
- Editions: 3 (as of 2018)
- First winner: Azzedine Lagab (ALG)
- Most wins: No repeat winners
- Most recent: Laurent Évrard (BEL)

The Tour International de la Wilaya d'Oran (Arabic: الطواف الدولي لولاية وهران), also called Tour International d'Oranie is a 2.2-categorised stage race held between 2015 and 2018 in Oran Province, Algeria, as part of the UCI Africa Tour.

== Winners ==
Year	Country	Rider	Team
2015	Algeria	Azzedine Lagab	Groupement Sportif des Pétroliers d'Algérie
2016	Italy	Luca Wackermann	Al Nasr Pro Cycling Team–Dubai
2017	No race		
2018	Belgium	Laurent Évrard	Sovac–Natura4Ever

== See also ==
- Grand Prix d'Oran
