= Circuit d'Alger =

Algerian one-day road cycling race

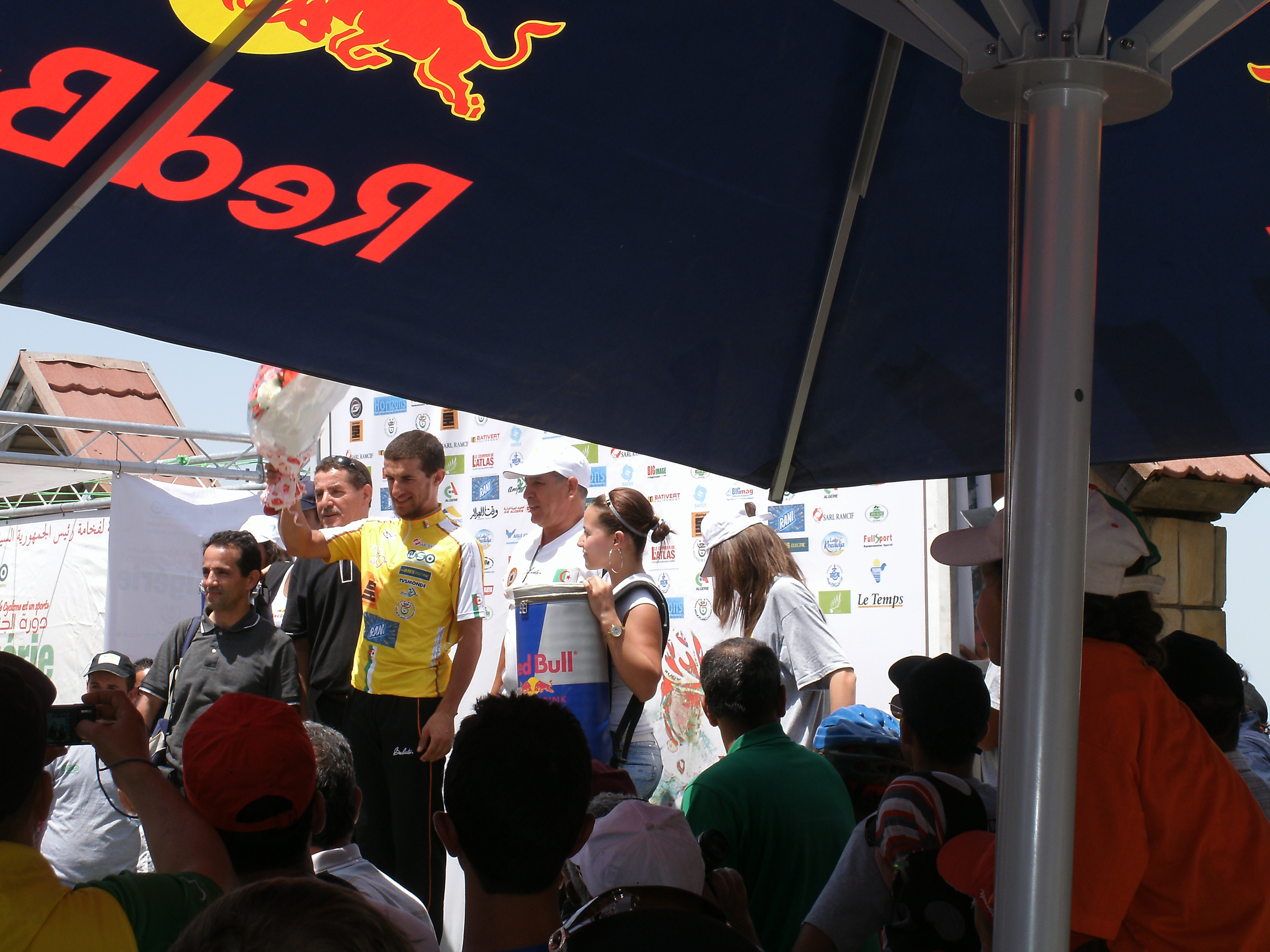
- Azzedine Lagab after winning the 2011 edition

Race details
- Region: Algeria
- Discipline: Road
- Competition: UCI Africa Tour
- Type: Stage race

History
- First edition: 2011
- Editions: 6
- Final edition: 2016
- First winner: Azzedine Lagab (ALG)
- Most wins: Azzedine Lagab (ALG) (2 wins)
- Final winner: Jesús Alberto Rubio (ESP)

The Circuit d'Alger was a cycling race held annually from 2011 to 2016 in Algeria. It was rated 2.2 event on the UCI Africa Tour.

== Winners ==
Year	Country	Rider	Team
2011	Algeria	Azzedine Lagab	Groupement Sportif Pétrolier Algérie
2012	Greece	Ioannis Tamouridis	SP Tableware Cycling Team
2013	Denmark	Martin Pedersen	Christina Watches–Onfone
2014	Algeria	Azzedine Lagab	Groupement Sportif des Pétroliers d´Algérie
2015	Algeria	Hichem Chaabane	Olympique Team Algérie Tour AGLO37
2016	Spain	Jesús Alberto Rubio	Al Nasr Pro Cycling Team–Dubai
