= Tour de Blida =

Algerian multi-day road cycling race

Race details
- Date: March
- Discipline: Road
- Competition: UCI Africa Tour
- Type: stage race
- Organiser: Algerian Cycling Federation

History
- First edition: 2013
- Editions: 5 (as of 2017)
- First winner: Hichem Chaabane (ALG)
- Most wins: No repeat winners
- Most recent: Youcef Reguigui (ALG)

The Tour de Blida is a staged cycling race held annually in Algeria since 2013. It is rated 2.2 and is part of UCI Africa Tour.

== Winners ==
Year	Country	Rider	Team
2013	Algeria	Hichem Chaabane	Vélo Club Sovac
2014	Eritrea	Amanuel Gebrezgabihier	Eritrea national team
2015	Eritrea	Mekseb Debesay	Bike Aid
2016	Italy	Luca Wackermann	Al Nasr Pro Cycling Team
2017	Algeria	Youcef Reguigui	Dimension Data
