= Tour de Constantine =

Algerian multi-day road cycling race

Race details
- Region: Algeria
- Discipline: Road
- Competition: UCI Africa Tour
- Type: Stage race

History
- First edition: 2014
- Editions: 3
- Final edition: 2016
- First winner: Sergey Belykh (RUS)
- Most wins: No repeat winners
- Final winner: Tomas Vaitkus (LTU)

The Tour de Constantine was a stage race held in Algeria between 2014 and 2016, that was rated 2.2 and was held as part of the UCI Africa Tour.

== Winners ==
Year	Country	Rider	Team
2014	Russia	Sergey Belykh	Team 21
2015	Eritrea	Amanuel Ghebreigzabhier	Eritrea (national team)
2016	Lithuania	Tomas Vaitkus	Al Nasr Pro Cycling Team–Dubai
