= 2015 UCI Road World Championships – Men's junior road race =

Men's junior road race
2015 UCI Road World Championships
- Rainbow jersey

Race details
- Dates: September 26, 2015
- Stages: 1
- Distance: 129.6 km (80.5 mi)
- Winning time: 3h 11' 09"

Medalists
	Gold	Felix Gall (AUT)
	Silver	Clément Bétouigt-Suire (FRA)
	Bronze	Rasmus Pedersen (DEN)

The Men's junior road race of the 2015 UCI Road World Championships took place in and around Richmond, Virginia, United States on September 26, 2015. The course of the race was eight laps over a 16.2 km (10.1 mi) circuit making 129.6 km (80.5 mi) with the start and finish in Richmond.

Austria's Felix Gall attacked with 20 km (12 mi) remaining and managed to stay clear at the head of the race to win the gold medal, holding off a fast-finishing Clément Bétouigt-Suire of France, in a two-up sprint finish. One second behind, Danish rider Rasmus Pedersen completed the podium with the bronze medal.

== Qualification ==
Qualification was based mainly on the final UCI Juniors Nations' Cup ranking as of August 15, 2015. The first ten nations in this classification qualified six riders to start, the next five nations qualified five riders to start and the next five nations qualified four riders to start. The United States, as the organising nation, were entitled five riders to start. Other nations and non ranked nations had the opportunity to send three riders to start. Moreover continental champions were qualified to take part in the race, on top of the nation numbers. The outgoing World Champion, Mathieu van der Poel, did not compete as he was no longer eligible to contest junior races.

Tour	Position	Number of riders	Nations
UCI Juniors Nations' Cup ranking	1–10	12 to enter, 6 to start	United States; Belgium; Denmark; France; Germany; Netherlands; Italy; Switzerland; Russia; Norway
UCI Juniors Nations' Cup ranking	11–15	10 to enter, 5 to start	Kazakhstan; Luxembourg; Ireland; Austria; Morocco
UCI Juniors Nations' Cup ranking	16–20	8 to enter, 4 to start	Slovenia; Poland; Mexico; Canada; Portugal
	—N/a	6 to enter, 3 to start	Other nations
Champion	Name		
African Champion	El Mehdi Chokri (MAR)		
Pan American Champion	Luis Villalobos (MEX)		
Asian Champion	Keitaro Sawada (JPN)		
European Champion	Alan Banaszek (POL)		
Oceanian Champion	Jackson Carman (AUS)		

== Course ==
Elevation profile of the road race circuit

The junior men rode eight laps on the road race circuit. The length of the circuit was 16.2 km (10.1 mi) and had a total elevation of 103 meters (338 feet). All road races took place on a challenging, technical and inner-city road circuit. The circuit headed west from Downtown Richmond, working its way onto Monument Avenue, a paver-lined, historic boulevard that's been named one of the "10 Great Streets in America". Cyclists took a 180-degree turn at the Jefferson Davis monument and then maneuvered through the Uptown district and Virginia Commonwealth University. Halfway through the circuit, the race headed down into Shockoe Bottom before following the canal and passing Great Shiplock Park, the start of the Virginia Capital Trail. A sharp, off-camber turn at Rocketts Landing brought the riders to the narrow, twisty, cobbled 200 meters (660 feet) climb up to Libby Hill Park in the historic Church Hill neighborhood. A quick descent, followed by three hard turns led to a 100 meters (330 feet) climb up 23rd Street. Once atop this steep cobbled hill, riders descended into Shockoe Bottom. This led them to the final 300 meters (980 feet) climb on Governor Street. At the top, the riders had to take a sharp left turn onto the false-flat finishing straight, 680 meters (2,230 feet) to the finish.

== Schedule ==
All times are in Eastern Daylight Time (UTC-4).

Date	Time	Event
September 26, 2015	09:00–12:15	Men's junior road race

== Participating nations ==
165 cyclists from 51 nations took part in the men's junior road race. The number of cyclists per nation is shown in parentheses.

- Algeria (3)
- Argentina (1)
- Australia (3)
- Austria (5)
- Azerbaijan (3)
- Belgium (6)
- Bosnia and Herzegovina (1)
- Brazil (3)
- Canada (4)
- Colombia (3)
- Costa Rica (1)
- Cyprus (1)
- Czech Republic (3)
- Denmark (5)
- Ecuador (3)
- El Salvador (1)
- Spain (3)
- Estonia (3)
- Finland (2)
- France (6)
- Great Britain (3)
- Germany (6)
- Guatemala (2)
- Hungary (2)
- Ireland (5)
- Israel (2)
- Italy (6)
- Japan (4)
- Kazakhstan (5)
- Latvia (1)
- Luxembourg (5)
- Morocco (2)
- Mexico (1)
- Mongolia (1)
- Netherlands (6)
- Norway (5)
- New Zealand (3)
- Poland (5)
- Portugal (4)
- Puerto Rico (1)
- South Africa (3)
- Russia (6)
- Singapore (1)
- Slovenia (4)
- Serbia (1)
- Switzerland (6)
- Slovakia (3)
- Sweden (3)
- Thailand (2)
- United States (6)
- Uzbekistan (1)

== Prize money ==
The UCI assigned premiums for the top 3 finishers with a total prize money of €3,450.

Position	1st	2nd	3rd	Total
Amount	€1,533	€1,150	€767	€3,450

== Final classification ==
Of the race's 165 entrants, 114 riders completed the full distance of 129.6 km (80.5 mi).

Rank	Rider	Country	Time
1	Felix Gall	Austria	3h 11' 09"
2	Clément Bétouigt-Suire	France	s.t.
3	Rasmus Pedersen	Denmark	+ 1"
4	Reto Müller	Switzerland	+ 10"
5	Martin Salmon	Germany	+ 10"
6	Nicola Conci	Italy	+ 10"
7	Mathias Norsgaard	Denmark	+ 13"
8	Nathan Draper	Great Britain	+ 13"
9	Marc Hirschi	Switzerland	+ 13"
10	Pit Leyder	Luxembourg	+ 20"
11	Thomas Vereecken	Belgium	+ 21"
12	Alexys Brunel	France	+ 23"
13	Anthon Charmig	Denmark	+ 26"
14	Max Kanter	Germany	+ 36"
15	Matteo Sobrero	Italy	+ 36"
16	Michael Storer	Australia	+ 36"
17	Gino Mäder	Switzerland	+ 36"
18	Adrien Costa	United States	+ 36"
19	Joey Walker	Great Britain	+ 36"
20	Kevin Geniets	Luxembourg	+ 36"
21	Jaka Primožič	Slovenia	+ 39"
22	Bjorg Lambrecht	Belgium	+ 45"
23	Tanguy Turgis	France	+ 45"
24	Nils Eekhoff	Netherlands	+ 45"
25	Marcel Neuhäuser	Austria	+ 45"
26	Vadim Pronskiy	Kazakhstan	+ 45"
27	Keagan Girdlestone	South Africa	+ 45"
28	Leo Appelt	Germany	+ 45"
29	Dušan Rajović	Serbia	+ 45"
30	Patrick Haller	Germany	+ 45"
31	Alexandr Kulikovskiy	Russia	+ 45"
32	Mario Spengler	Switzerland	+ 45"
33	André Carvalho	Portugal	+ 45"
34	Kristo Enn Vaga	Estonia	+ 45"
35	Robin Froidevaux	Switzerland	+ 45"
36	Markus Wildauer	Austria	+ 54"
37	Jasper Philipsen	Belgium	+ 54"
38	Luis Villalobos	Mexico	+ 58"
39	Dennis van der Horst	Netherlands	+ 1' 00"
40	Stefan Bissegger	Switzerland	+ 1' 00"
41	Michael O'Loughlin	Ireland	+ 1' 04"
42	Gorazd Per	Slovenia	+ 1' 07"
43	Karl Patrick Lauk	Estonia	+ 1' 09"
44	Alejandro Gómiz	Spain	+ 1' 12"
45	Derek Gee	Canada	+ 1' 12"
46	Luc Wirtgen	Luxembourg	+ 1' 12"
47	Jakub Otruba	Czech Republic	+ 1' 12"
48	Jhonatan Narváez	Ecuador	+ 1' 12"
49	Robbe Ghys	Belgium	+ 1' 12"
50	Max Singer	Germany	+ 1' 12"
51	Jorge Magalhães	Portugal	+ 1' 12"
52	Pascal Eenkhoorn	Netherlands	+ 1' 12"
53	Georg Zimmermann	Germany	+ 1' 12"
54	Sam Jenner	Australia	+ 1' 19"
55	Marco Friedrich	Austria	+ 1' 25"
56	Bram Welten	Netherlands	+ 1' 27"
57	Théo Menant	France	+ 1' 33"
58	Alejandro Regueiro	Spain	+ 1' 33"
59	Alan Banaszek	Poland	+ 1' 40"
60	Sergey Rostovtsev	Russia	+ 1' 40"
61	Riccardo Verza	Italy	+ 1' 40"
62	Christopher Blevins	United States	+ 2' 05"
63	Niklas Larsen	Denmark	+ 2' 05"
64	Louis Louvet	France	+ 2' 12"
65	Aleksander Borisov	Russia	+ 2' 18"
66	Robert Stannard	New Zealand	+ 2' 30"
67	Pablo Alonso	Spain	+ 2' 38"
68	Stan Dewulf	Belgium	+ 3' 04"
69	Patrick Gamper	Austria	+ 3' 16"
70	Masahiro Ishigami	Japan	+ 3' 18"
71	Daniel Savini	Italy	+ 3' 25"
72	Tommaso Fiaschi	Italy	+ 3' 25"
73	Willem Boersma	Canada	+ 3' 29"
74	Marten Kooistra	Netherlands	+ 3' 32"
75	Szymon Sajnok	Poland	+ 3' 34"
76	Aaron Verwilst	Belgium	+ 3' 34"
77	Torjus Sleen	Norway	+ 3' 39"
78	Hans Kristian Rudland	Norway	+ 3' 39"
79	Lars Saugstad	Norway	+ 4' 29"
80	Petter Fagerhaug	Norway	+ 4' 29"
81	Simm Kiskonen	Estonia	+ 5' 17"
82	Dávid Kovács	Hungary	+ 5' 17"
83	Tobias Foss	Norway	+ 5' 26"

Rank	Rider	Country	Time
84	Samuel Oros	Slovakia	+ 6' 07"
85	Martin Spudil	Czech Republic	+ 6' 33"
86	Vitor Schizzi	Brazil	+ 6' 51"
87	Julián Cardona	Colombia	+ 6' 52"
88	Jack Maddux	United States	+ 7' 16"
89	Adam Stenson	Ireland	+ 7' 25"
90	Vincent Andersson	Sweden	+ 7' 33"
91	Tiago Da Silva	Luxembourg	+ 11' 43"
92	El Mehdi Chokri	Morocco	+ 12' 30"
93	Keitaro Sawada	Japan	+ 12' 30"
94	Barnabás Peák	Hungary	+ 15' 59"
95	Adrián Bustamante	Colombia	+ 16' 01"
96	Javier Montoya	Colombia	+ 16' 01"
97	Itamar Einhorn	Israel	+ 16' 08"
98	Adrian Foltan	Slovakia	+ 16' 19"
99	Dinmukhammed Ulysbayev	Kazakhstan	+ 16' 32"
100	Erik Sierra	Ecuador	+ 16' 33"
101	Melvin Boron	Guatemala	+ 16' 33"
102	Mohcine El Kouraji	Morocco	+ 16' 33"
103	Oussama Mansouri	Algeria	+ 16' 36"
104	Joel Taylor	Canada	+ 16' 48"
105	Erik Sandersson	Sweden	+ 17' 09"
106	Daniel Viegas	Portugal	+ 18' 14"
107	João Almeida	Portugal	+ 18' 14"
108	Antonio Barać	Bosnia and Herzegovina	+ 19' 08"
109	Patompob Phonarjthan	Thailand	+ 19' 18"
110	Ethan Reynolds	United States	+ 19' 41"
111	Jonathan Brown	United States	+ 19' 41"
112	Jake Gray	Ireland	+ 19' 41"
113	Yuttana Mano	Thailand	+ 19' 41"
114	Islam Mansouri	Algeria	+ 21' 04"
	Nicolas Nesi	Italy	DNF
	Denis Nekrasov	Russia	DNF
	Brandon McNulty	United States	DNF
	Simon Tuomey	Ireland	DNF
	Nikita Sokolov	Kazakhstan	DNF
	James Fouché	New Zealand	DNF
	Amine Belabessi	Algeria	DNF
	Alexandros Agrotis	Cyprus	DNF
	Bryan Mendoza	El Salvador	DNF
	Fredy Toc	Guatemala	DNF
	Joe Holt	Great Britain	DNF
	Saar Hershler	Israel	DNF
	Adam Roberge	Canada	DNF
	Nikolay Ilichev	Russia	DNF
	Andreas Stokbro	Denmark	DNF
	Tadej Pogačar	Slovenia	DNF
	Michal Brázda	Czech Republic	DNF
	Norbert Banaszek	Poland	DNF
	Juraj Michalička	Slovakia	DNF
	Kanan Gahramanli	Azerbaijan	DNF
	Gustaf Andersson	Sweden	DNF
	Dmitriy Ponkratov	Uzbekistan	DNF
	Tarlan Mammadov	Azerbaijan	DNF
	Gunyaidin Khaji	Kazakhstan	DNF
	Kotaro Ono	Japan	DNF
	Santiago Yeri	Argentina	DNF
	Ilya Gorbushin	Kazakhstan	DNF
	Kyle De Wet	South Africa	DNF
	Ayumu Watanabe	Japan	DNF
	Jarno Mobach	Netherlands	DNF
	Bryan Portilla	Ecuador	DNF
	Jarrod Hattingh	South Africa	DNF
	Erik Relanto	Finland	DNF
	Damian Sławek	Poland	DNF
	Dawid Gieracki	Poland	DNF
	Márcio Oliveira	Brazil	DNF
	Tegsh-Bayar Batsaikhan	Mongolia	DNF
	Mário Rojas	Costa Rica	DNF
	Pavel Sivakov	Russia	DNF
	Mathieu Burgaudeau]	France	DNF
	Ēriks Toms Gavars	Latvia	DNF
	Darragh O'Mahoney	Ireland	DNF
	Pédro Martins	Brazil	DNF
	Harry Sweeny	Australia	DNF
	Ahulee Rivera	Puerto Rico	DNF
	Merrill Chua	Singapore	DNF
	Žiga Jerman	Slovenia	DNF
	Sam Dobbs	New Zealand	DNF
	Michel Ries	Luxembourg	DNF
	Musa Mikayilzade	Azerbaijan	DNF
	Jaakko Hänninen	Finland	DNS
