= Cycling at the 2010 Asian Games – Men's sprint =

Men's sprint at the 2010 Asian Games
- Venue: Guangzhou Velodrome
- Date: 14–17 November 2010
- Competitors: 18 from 11 nations

Medalists
gold medal	Zhang Lei	China
silver medal	Tsubasa Kitatsuru	Japan
bronze medal	Yudai Nitta	Japan

The men's sprint competition at the 2010 Asian Games was held from 14 to 17 November at the Guangzhou Velodrome.

== Schedule ==
All times are China Standard Time (UTC+08:00)

Date	Time	Event
Sunday, 14 November 2010	14:00	Qualifying
Sunday, 14 November 2010	15:42	1/16 finals
Sunday, 14 November 2010	16:43	Repechages 1/16
Sunday, 14 November 2010	17:21	1/8 finals
Sunday, 14 November 2010	17:45	Repechages 1/8
Monday, 15 November 2010	11:17	Quarterfinals
Monday, 15 November 2010	11:41	Race 9th–12th
Tuesday, 16 November 2010	10:00	Semifinals
Wednesday, 17 November 2010	10:00	Finals
Wednesday, 17 November 2010	10:12	Race 5th–8th

== Records ==
Prior to this competition, the existing world, Asian and Games records were as follows.

World Record	Kévin Sireau (FRA)	9.572	Moscow, Russia	30 May 2009
Asian Record	Zhang Lei (CHN)	10.116	Pruszków, Poland	28 March 2009
Games Record	Josiah Ng (MAS)	10.537	Doha, Qatar	11 December 2006

== Results ==
Legend

- DNS — Did not start

=== Qualifying ===
Rank	Athlete	Time	Notes
1	Zhang Lei (CHN)	10.140	GR
2	Tsubasa Kitatsuru (JPN)	10.297	
3	Azizulhasni Awang (MAS)	10.361	
4	Yudai Nitta (JPN)	10.363	
5	Feng Yong (CHN)	10.366	
6	Hassan Ali Varposhti (IRI)	10.474	
7	Mohd Edrus Yunus (MAS)	10.514	
8	Choi Lae-seon (KOR)	10.546	
9	Farshid Farsinejadian (IRI)	10.779	
10	Son Gyeong-su (KOR)	10.814	
11	Badr Ali Shambih (UAE)	11.118	
12	Hsiao Shih-hsin (TPE)	11.194	
13	Okram Bikram Singh (IND)	11.496	
14	Hylem Prince (IND)	11.634	
15	Raja Audi (LIB)	11.727	
16	Ayman Al-Habriti (KSA)	12.042	
17	Khalid Al-Bardiny (QAT)	12.107	
18	Ahmed Al-Bardiny (QAT)	12.201	

=== 1/16 finals ===
==== Heat 1 ====
Rank	Athlete	Time
1	Zhang Lei (CHN)	
—	Ahmed Al-Bardiny (QAT)	DNS

==== Heat 2 ====
Rank	Athlete	Time
1	Tsubasa Kitatsuru (JPN)	
—	Khalid Al-Bardiny (QAT)	DNS

==== Heat 3 ====
Rank	Athlete	Time
1	Azizulhasni Awang (MAS)	11.846
2	Ayman Al-Habriti (KSA)	

==== Heat 4 ====
Rank	Athlete	Time
1	Yudai Nitta (JPN)	12.266
2	Raja Audi (LIB)	

==== Heat 5 ====
Rank	Athlete	Time
1	Feng Yong (CHN)	12.096
2	Hylem Prince (IND)	

==== Heat 6 ====
Rank	Athlete	Time
1	Hassan Ali Varposhti (IRI)	11.571
2	Okram Bikram Singh (IND)	

==== Heat 7 ====
Rank	Athlete	Time
1	Mohd Edrus Yunus (MAS)	12.286
2	Hsiao Shih-hsin (TPE)	

==== Heat 8 ====
Rank	Athlete	Time
1	Choi Lae-seon (KOR)	11.558
2	Badr Ali Shambih (UAE)	

==== Heat 9 ====
Rank	Athlete	Time
1	Farshid Farsinejadian (IRI)	10.990
2	Son Gyeong-su (KOR)	

=== Repechages 1/16 ===
==== Heat 1 ====
Rank	Athlete	Time
1	Son Gyeong-su (KOR)	11.112
2	Okram Bikram Singh (IND)	

==== Heat 2 ====
Rank	Athlete	Time
1	Hsiao Shih-hsin (TPE)	11.807
2	Hylem Prince (IND)	

==== Heat 3 ====
Rank	Athlete	Time
1	Badr Ali Shambih (UAE)	11.735
2	Ayman Al-Habriti (KSA)	
3	Raja Audi (LIB)	

=== 1/8 finals ===
==== Heat 1 ====
Rank	Athlete	Time
1	Zhang Lei (CHN)	10.812
2	Badr Ali Shambih (UAE)	

==== Heat 2 ====
Rank	Athlete	Time
1	Tsubasa Kitatsuru (JPN)	11.255
2	Hsiao Shih-hsin (TPE)	

==== Heat 3 ====
Rank	Athlete	Time
1	Azizulhasni Awang (MAS)	11.115
2	Son Gyeong-su (KOR)	

==== Heat 4 ====
Rank	Athlete	Time
1	Yudai Nitta (JPN)	11.182
2	Farshid Farsinejadian (IRI)	

==== Heat 5 ====
Rank	Athlete	Time
1	Choi Lae-seon (KOR)	10.999
2	Feng Yong (CHN)	

==== Heat 6 ====
Rank	Athlete	Time
1	Hassan Ali Varposhti (IRI)	11.088
2	Mohd Edrus Yunus (MAS)	

=== Repechages 1/8 ===
==== Heat 1 ====
Rank	Athlete	Time
1	Farshid Farsinejadian (IRI)	11.094
2	Mohd Edrus Yunus (MAS)	
3	Badr Ali Shambih (UAE)	

==== Heat 2 ====
Rank	Athlete	Time
1	Feng Yong (CHN)	11.133
2	Son Gyeong-su (KOR)	
3	Hsiao Shih-hsin (TPE)	

=== Race 9th–12th ===
Rank	Athlete	Time
1	Son Gyeong-su (KOR)	11.460
2	Badr Ali Shambih (UAE)	
3	Mohd Edrus Yunus (MAS)	
4	Hsiao Shih-hsin (TPE)	

=== Quarterfinals ===
==== Heat 1 ====
Rank	Athlete	Race 1	Race 2	Race 3
1	Zhang Lei (CHN)	10.889	11.446	
2	Feng Yong (CHN)			

==== Heat 2 ====
Rank	Athlete	Race 1	Race 2	Race 3
1	Tsubasa Kitatsuru (JPN)	10.754	10.857	
2	Farshid Farsinejadian (IRI)			

==== Heat 3 ====
Rank	Athlete	Race 1	Race 2	Race 3
1	Azizulhasni Awang (MAS)	10.781	10.928	
2	Hassan Ali Varposhti (IRI)			

==== Heat 4 ====
Rank	Athlete	Race 1	Race 2	Race 3
1	Yudai Nitta (JPN)	11.229	10.588	
2	Choi Lae-seon (KOR)			

=== Race 5th–8th ===
Rank	Athlete	Time
1	Hassan Ali Varposhti (IRI)	10.969
2	Choi Lae-seon (KOR)	
3	Farshid Farsinejadian (IRI)	
4	Feng Yong (CHN)	

=== Semifinals ===
==== Heat 1 ====
Rank	Athlete	Race 1	Race 2	Race 3
1	Zhang Lei (CHN)	10.882	10.759	
2	Yudai Nitta (JPN)			

==== Heat 2 ====
Rank	Athlete	Race 1	Race 2	Race 3
1	Tsubasa Kitatsuru (JPN)	10.550		10.734
2	Azizulhasni Awang (MAS)		10.449	

=== Finals ===
==== Bronze ====
Rank	Athlete	Race 1	Race 2	Race 3
1	Yudai Nitta (JPN)	11.231	11.023	
2	Azizulhasni Awang (MAS)			

==== Gold ====
Rank	Athlete	Race 1	Race 2	Race 3
1	Zhang Lei (CHN)	11.127	10.921	
2	Tsubasa Kitatsuru (JPN)			

== Final standing ==
Rank	Athlete
1st place, gold medalist(s)	Zhang Lei (CHN)
2nd place, silver medalist(s)	Tsubasa Kitatsuru (JPN)
3rd place, bronze medalist(s)	Yudai Nitta (JPN)
4	Azizulhasni Awang (MAS)
5	Hassan Ali Varposhti (IRI)
6	Choi Lae-seon (KOR)
7	Farshid Farsinejadian (IRI)
8	Feng Yong (CHN)
9	Son Gyeong-su (KOR)
10	Badr Ali Shambih (UAE)
11	Mohd Edrus Yunus (MAS)
12	Hsiao Shih-hsin (TPE)
13	Okram Bikram Singh (IND)
14	Hylem Prince (IND)
15	Raja Audi (LIB)
16	Ayman Al-Habriti (KSA)
17	Khalid Al-Bardiny (QAT)
18	Ahmed Al-Bardiny (QAT)
