= Cycling at the 2010 Asian Games – Men's team sprint =

Men's team sprint at the 2010 Asian Games
- Venue: Guangzhou Velodrome
- Date: 13–14 November 2010
- Competitors: 21 from 7 nations

Medalists
gold medal	China; Zhang Lei, Zhang Miao, Cheng Changsong
silver medal	Japan; Kazunari Watanabe, Yudai Nitta, Kazuya Narita
bronze medal	Iran; Farshid Farsinejadian, Mahmoud Parash, Hassan Ali Varposhti

The men's team sprint competition at the 2010 Asian Games was held on 13 and 14 November at the Guangzhou Velodrome.

== Schedule ==
All times are China Standard Time (UTC+08:00)

Date	Time	Event
Saturday, 13 November 2010	11:30	Qualifying
Sunday, 14 November 2010	11:30	Finals

== Results ==
=== Qualifying ===
Rank	Team	Time
1	China (CHN); Zhang Lei; Zhang Miao; Cheng Changsong	44.406
2	Japan (JPN); Kazunari Watanabe; Yudai Nitta; Kazuya Narita	44.855
3	Malaysia (MAS); Mohd Rizal Tisin; Mohd Edrus Yunus; Josiah Ng	45.118
4	Iran (IRI); Farshid Farsinejadian; Mahmoud Parash; Hassan Ali Varposhti	45.146
5	South Korea (KOR); Son Gyeong-su; Kim Woo-yeong; Choi Lae-seon	46.206
6	India (IND); Okram Bikram Singh; Hylem Prince; Amrit Singh	50.318
7	Saudi Arabia (KSA); Ayman Al-Habriti; Bader Al-Yasin; Sultan Assiri	53.708

=== Finals ===
==== Bronze ====
Rank	Team	Time
3rd place, bronze medalist(s)	Iran (IRI); Farshid Farsinejadian; Mahmoud Parash; Hassan Ali Varposhti	44.815
4	Malaysia (MAS); Mohd Rizal Tisin; Mohd Edrus Yunus; Josiah Ng	45.175

==== Gold ====
Rank	Team	Time
1st place, gold medalist(s)	China (CHN); Zhang Lei; Zhang Miao; Cheng Changsong	44.429
2nd place, silver medalist(s)	Japan (JPN); Kazunari Watanabe; Yudai Nitta; Kazuya Narita	44.633
