= Cycling at the 2006 Asian Games – Men's team sprint =

Men's team sprint at the 2006 Asian Games
- Venue: Aspire Hall 1
- Date: 10 December 2006
- Competitors: 28 from 9 nations

Medalists
gold medal	Japan; Kazuya Narita, Yudai Nitta, Kazunari Watanabe
silver medal	China; Feng Yong, Lin Feng, Zhang Lei
bronze medal	South Korea; Choi Lae-seon, Kang Dong-jin, Yang Hee-chun

The men's team sprint competition at the 2006 Asian Games was held on 10 December at the Aspire Hall 1.

== Schedule ==
All times are Arabia Standard Time (UTC+03:00)

Date	Time	Event
Sunday, 10 December 2006	12:30	Qualifying
Sunday, 10 December 2006	14:28	Finals

== Results ==
Legend

- DNS — Did not start

=== Qualifying ===
Rank	Team	Time
1	Japan (JPN); Kazuya Narita; Yusho Oikawa; Kazunari Watanabe	45.735
2	China (CHN); Feng Yong; Lin Feng; Zhang Lei	46.019
3	South Korea (KOR); Choi Lae-seon; Kang Dong-jin; Yang Hee-chun	46.559
4	Malaysia (MAS); Junaidi Nasir; Josiah Ng; Mohd Rizal Tisin	46.829
5	Iran (IRI); Farshid Farsinejadian; Mahmoud Parash; Hassan Ali Varposhti	47.768
6	Chinese Taipei (TPE); Hung Chia-wei; Li Chung-ling; Liao Kuo-lung	48.295
7	Philippines (PHI); Paulo Manapul; Jan Paul Morales; Edwin Paragoso	50.095
8	Bahrain (BRN); Husain Ebrahim; Mohamed Husain; Ali Hassan Mansoor	53.835
—	Saudi Arabia (KSA); Ayman Al-Habriti; Bader Al-Yasin; Ahmed Assiri	DNS

=== Finals ===
==== Bronze ====
Rank	Team	Time
3rd place, bronze medalist(s)	South Korea (KOR); Choi Lae-seon; Kang Dong-jin; Yang Hee-chun	46.266
4	Malaysia (MAS); Junaidi Nasir; Josiah Ng; Mohd Rizal Tisin	46.445

==== Gold ====
Rank	Team	Time
1st place, gold medalist(s)	Japan (JPN); Kazuya Narita; Yudai Nitta; Kazunari Watanabe	45.590
2nd place, silver medalist(s)	China (CHN); Feng Yong; Lin Feng; Zhang Lei	45.673
