= 2015 UCI Road World Championships – Men's time trial =

Men's time trial
2015 UCI Road World Championships
- Time trial Rainbow jersey

Race details
- Dates: September 23, 2015
- Stages: 1
- Distance: 53.5 km (33.24 mi)
- Winning time: 1h 02' 29.45"

Medalists
	Gold	Vasil Kiryienka (BLR)
	Silver	Adriano Malori (ITA)
	Bronze	Jérôme Coppel (FRA)

The Men's time trial of the 2015 UCI Road World Championships is a cycling event that took place on September 23, 2015, in Richmond, Virginia, United States. It was the 22nd edition of the championship. Bradley Wiggins was the outgoing champion but did not defend his title.

Vasil Kiryienka won the gold medal for Belarus, recording a time 9.08 seconds quicker than his closest rival, Italian rider Adriano Malori. The podium was completed by France's Jérôme Coppel, 26.62 seconds behind Kiryienka's winning time.

== Course ==
The riders began their race 20 miles north of Richmond at Kings Dominion, Virginia's premier amusement park in Hanover County. Racers then went past Meadow Event Park, home to the State Fair of Virginia and the birthplace of thoroughbred racing legend Secretariat. Racers headed south on long, open straights past the Hanover County Courthouse, the third oldest courthouse still in use in the U.S. and dating back to about 1740. Long hills on Brook and Wilkinson roads brought the racers back into the city through Virginia Union University before turning downtown. Nearly half the turns of the entire route fell within the closing kilometers, the second to last of which was to ascend 300 meters (980 feet) on Governor Street. At the top, the riders had to take a sharp left turn onto the false-flat finishing straight, 680 meters (2,230 feet) to the finish.

== Qualification ==
=== Qualification for the event ===
All National Federations were allowed to enter four riders for the race, with a maximum of two riders to start. In addition to this number, the outgoing World Champion and the current continental champions were also able to take part.

Champion	Name	Participation
Outgoing World Champion	Bradley Wiggins (GBR)	Did not participate
African Champion	Tsgabu Grmay (ETH)	Did not participate
Pan American Champion	Carlos Oyarzun (CHI)	Did not participate
Asian Champion	Hossein Askari (IRI)	Did not participate
Oceanian Champion	Michael Hepburn (AUS)	Scheduled to participate

=== Olympic qualification ===
This time trial was also part of the qualification of the men's time trial at the 2016 Summer Olympics. The first ten nations in the time trial qualified one athlete.

== Schedule ==
All times are in Eastern Daylight Time (UTC-4).

Date	Time	Event
September 23, 2015	13:00–15:35	Men's individual time trial

== Start list ==
The following riders were confirmed by their respective nations.

No.	Rider	Country
1	Tony Martin	Germany
2	Tom Dumoulin	Netherlands
3	Vasil Kiryienka	Belarus
4	Rohan Dennis	Australia
5	Adriano Malori	Italy
6	Matthias Brändle	Austria
7	Jonathan Castroviejo	Spain
8	Maciej Bodnar	Poland
9	Stefan Küng	Switzerland
10	Alex Dowsett	Great Britain
11	Jan Bárta	Czech Republic
12	Nelson Oliveira	Portugal
13	Jesse Sergent	New Zealand
14	Taylor Phinney	United States
15	Jurgen Van den Broeck	Belgium
16	Christopher Juul-Jensen	Denmark
17	Jérôme Coppel	France
18	Ramūnas Navardauskas	Lithuania
19	Artem Ovechkin	Russia
20	Andreas Vangstad	Norway
21	Rigoberto Urán	Colombia
22	Andriy Hryvko	Ukraine
23	Hugo Houle	Canada
24	Mekseb Debesay	Eritrea

No.	Rider	Country
25	Alexey Lutsenko	Kazakhstan
26	Tanel Kangert	Estonia
27	Segundo Navarrete	Ecuador
28	Gatis Smukulis	Latvia
29	Gustav Larsson	Sweden
30	Polychronis Tzortzakis	Greece
31	Adrien Niyonshuti	Rwanda
32	Serghei Țvetcov	Romania
33	Nikolay Mihaylov	Bulgaria
34	Manuel Rodas	Guatemala
35	Muradjan Khalmuratov	Uzbekistan
36	Tuguldur Tuulkhangai	Mongolia
37	Juan Martinez	Puerto Rico
38	Alexandre Pliușchin	Moldova
39	Gorgi Popstefanov	Macedonia
40	Norlandis Taveras	Dominican Republic
41	Ahmed Albourdainy	Qatar
42	David Albós	Andorra
43	Nikias Arndt	Germany
44	Wilco Kelderman	Netherlands
45	Kanstantsin Sivtsov	Belarus
46	Luke Durbridge	Australia
47	Moreno Moser	Italy

No.	Rider	Country
48	Lukas Pöstlberger	Austria
49	Luis León Sánchez	Spain
50	Marcin Białobłocki	Poland
51	Silvan Dillier	Switzerland
52	Steven Cummings	Great Britain
53	Petr Vakoč	Czech Republic
54	Sam Bewley	New Zealand
55	Lawson Craddock	United States
56	Yves Lampaert	Belgium
57	Rasmus Quaade	Denmark
58	Romain Sicard	France
59	Gediminas Bagdonas	Lithuania
60	Ilnur Zakarin	Russia
61	Vegard Stake Laengen	Norway
62	Ryan Roth	Canada
63	Daniil Fominykh	Kazakhstan
64	Rein Taaramäe	Estonia
65	Carlos Quishpe	Ecuador
66	Aleksejs Saramotins	Latvia
67	Tobias Ludvigsson	Sweden
68	Neofytos Sakellaridis	Greece
69	Rafael German	Dominican Republic
70	Michael Hepburn	Australia

== Final classification ==
Rank	Rider	Time
1	(Belarus) Vasil Kiryienka (BLR)	1h 02' 29.45"
2	(Italy) Adriano Malori (ITA)	+ 9.08"
3	(France) Jérôme Coppel (FRA)	+ 26.62"
4	(Spain) Jonathan Castroviejo (ESP)	+ 29.36"
5	(Netherlands) Tom Dumoulin (NED)	+ 1' 01.51"
6	(Australia) Rohan Dennis (AUS)	+ 1' 07.96"
7	(Germany) Tony Martin (GER)	+ 1' 16.73"
8	(Poland) Maciej Bodnar (POL)	+ 1' 17.33"
9	(Poland) Marcin Białobłocki (POL)	+ 1' 22.42"
10	(Italy) Moreno Moser (ITA)	+ 1' 31.61"
11	(Czech Republic) Jan Bárta (CZE)	+ 1' 34.04"
12	(United States) Taylor Phinney (USA)	+ 1' 36.99"
13	(Portugal) Nelson Oliveira (POR)	+ 1' 52.38"
14	(United Kingdom) Steve Cummings (GBR)	+ 1' 58.89"
15	(Australia) Michael Hepburn (AUS)	+ 1' 59.20"
16	(Austria) Matthias Brändle (AUT)	+ 1' 59.88"
17	(United Kingdom) Alex Dowsett (GBR)	+ 2' 06.56"
18	(Belgium) Jurgen Van den Broeck (BEL)	+ 2' 15.91"
19	(Switzerland) Stefan Küng (SUI)	+ 2' 17.63"
20	(Australia) Luke Durbridge (AUS)	+ 2' 18.22"
21	(Denmark) Rasmus Quaade (DEN)	+ 2' 19.17"
22	(United States) Lawson Craddock (USA)	+ 2' 27.34"
23	(Netherlands) Wilco Kelderman (NED)	+ 2' 31.18"
24	(Ukraine) Andriy Hryvko (UKR)	+ 2' 32.28"
25	(Canada) Hugo Houle (CAN)	+ 2' 35.87"
26	(Spain) Luis León Sánchez (ESP)	+ 2' 45.17"
27	(Belarus) Kanstantsin Sivtsov (BLR)	+ 2' 47.95"
28	(Latvia) Gatis Smukulis (LAT)	+ 2' 56.12"
29	(Estonia) Rein Taaramäe (EST)	+ 2' 56.13"
30	(Switzerland) Silvan Dillier (SUI)	+ 2' 56.78"
31	(Belgium) Yves Lampaert (BEL)	+ 2' 59.52"
32	(Estonia) Tanel Kangert (EST)	+ 3' 01.21"
33	(Russia) Ilnur Zakarin (RUS)	+ 3' 07.22"
34	(Kazakhstan) Daniil Fominykh (KAZ)	+ 3' 13.15"
35	(New Zealand) Jesse Sergent (NZL)	+ 3' 13.59"
36	(Kazakhstan) Alexey Lutsenko (KAZ)	+ 3' 23.83"
37	(Norway) Vegard Stake Laengen (NOR)	+ 3' 25.51"
38	(Sweden) Gustav Larsson (SWE)	+ 3' 25.79"
39	(Latvia) Aleksejs Saramotins (LAT)	+ 3' 26.67"
40	(Lithuania) Ramūnas Navardauskas (LTU)	+ 3' 30.20"
41	(Sweden) Tobias Ludvigsson (SWE)	+ 3' 30.59"
42	(Norway) Andreas Vangstad (NOR)	+ 3' 43.23"
43	(New Zealand) Sam Bewley (NZL)	+ 3' 44.22"
44	(Canada) Ryan Roth (CAN)	+ 3' 51.14"
45	(Denmark) Christopher Juul-Jensen (DEN)	+ 3' 55.26"
46	(France) Romain Sicard (FRA)	+ 3' 56.61"
47	(Moldova) Alexandre Pliușchin (MDA)	+ 4' 00.34"
48	(Austria) Lukas Pöstlberger (AUT)	+ 4' 18.12"
49	(Eritrea) Mekseb Debesay (ERI)	+ 4' 20.33"
50	(Lithuania) Gediminas Bagdonas (LTU)	+ 4' 20.38"
51	(Colombia) Rigoberto Urán (COL)	+ 4' 40.65"
52	(Germany) Nikias Arndt (GER)	+ 4' 47.00"
53	(Czech Republic) Petr Vakoč (CZE)	+ 5' 01.26"
54	(Romania) Serghei Țvetcov (ROU)	+ 5' 38.95"
55	(Greece) Polychronis Tzortzakis (GRE)	+ 5' 47.86"
56	(Guatemala) Manuel Rodas (GUA)	+ 5' 53.85"
57	(Mongolia) Tuguldur Tuulkhangai (MGL)	+ 6' 45.70"
58	(Greece) Neofytos Sakellaridis (GRE)	+ 7' 05.06"
59	(Uzbekistan) Muradjan Khalmuratov (UZB)	+ 7' 06.79"
60	(Ecuador) Segundo Navarrete (ECU)	+ 8' 50.76"
61	(Qatar) Ahmed Albourdainy (QAT)	+ 9' 45.89"
62	(Andorra) David Albós (AND)	+ 11' 55.93"
63	(North Macedonia) Gorgi Popstefanov (MKD)	+ 13' 05.52"
64	(Puerto Rico) Juan Martínez (PUR)	+ 13' 43.53"
65	(Ecuador) Carlos Quishpe (ECU)	+ 14' 14.66"
	(Russia) Artem Ovechkin (RUS)	DNS
	(Rwanda) Adrien Niyonshuti (RWA)	DNS
	(Bulgaria) Nikolay Mihaylov (BUL)	DNS
	(Dominican Republic) Norlandys Taveras (DOM)	DNS
	(Dominican Republic) Rafael Germán (DOM)	DNS
