= 2015 UCI Road World Championships – Men's junior time trial =

Men's junior time trial
2015 UCI Road World Championships
- Time trial Rainbow jersey

Race details
- Dates: September 22, 2015
- Stages: 1
- Distance: 29.9 km (18.58 mi)
- Winning time: 37' 45.01"

Medalists
	Gold	Leo Appelt (DEU)
	Silver	Adrien Costa (USA)
	Bronze	Brandon McNulty (USA)

The Men's junior time trial of the 2015 UCI Road World Championships took place in and around Richmond, Virginia, United States on September 22, 2015. The course of the race was 29.9 km (18.6 mi) with the start and finish in Richmond.

German rider Leo Appelt won the gold medal by 17.22 seconds ahead of Adrien Costa of the United States, who finished second for the second successive year. The bronze medal went to another American rider, Brandon McNulty, who finished almost a minute down on Appelt.

== Qualification ==
All National Federations were allowed to enter four riders for the race, with a maximum of two riders to start. In addition to this number, the outgoing World Champion and the current continental champions were also able to take part.

Champion	Name	Note
Outgoing World Champion	Lennard Kämna (GER)	Did not participate
African Champion	Gregory De Vink (RSA)	
European Champion	Nikolay Ilichev (RUS)	
Oceanian Champion	Michael Storer (AUS)	
Pan American Champion	Julian Cardona (COL)	
Asian Champion	Ka Hoo Fung (HKG)	Did not participate

== Course ==
The individual time trial was contested on a circuit of 15 km (9.3 mi) and has a total elevation of 96 meters (315 feet). The junior men rode two laps of the circuit.

The circuit was a technical course that went through the city of Richmond. From the start, the route headed west from downtown to Monument Avenue, a paver-lined, historic boulevard that's been named one of the "10 Great Streets in America." From there, the course made a 180-degree turn at N. Davis Avenue and continued in the opposite direction. The race then cut through the Uptown district before coming back through Virginia Commonwealth University and then crossing the James River. After a technical turnaround, the race came back across the river and worked its way through downtown Richmond, eventually heading up to ascend 300 meters (980 feet) on Governor Street. At the top, the riders had to take a sharp left turn onto the false-flat finishing straight, 680 meters (2,230 feet) to the finish.

== Schedule ==
All times are in Eastern Daylight Time (UTC−4).

Date	Time	Event
September 22, 2015	09:30–13:05	Men's junior time trial

== Participating nations ==
57 cyclists from 33 nations took part in the men's junior time trial. The number of cyclists per nation is shown in parentheses.

- Algeria (2)
- Argentina (1)
- Australia (2)
- Austria (2)
- Belgium (2)
- Bosnia and Herzegovina (1)
- Brazil (2)
- Canada (2)
- Colombia (2)
- Czech Republic (1)
- Denmark (2)
- Ecuador (2)
- Spain (1)
- France (2)
- Germany (2)
- Hungary (1)
- Ireland (2)
- Italy (2)
- Japan (3)
- Kazakhstan (2)
- Latvia (1)
- Morocco (2)
- Mongolia (1)
- Norway (2)
- New Zealand (2)
- Poland (1)
- South Africa (2)
- Russia (3)
- Singapore (1)
- Switzerland (2)
- Sweden (1)
- Thailand (1)
- United States (2)

== Final classification ==
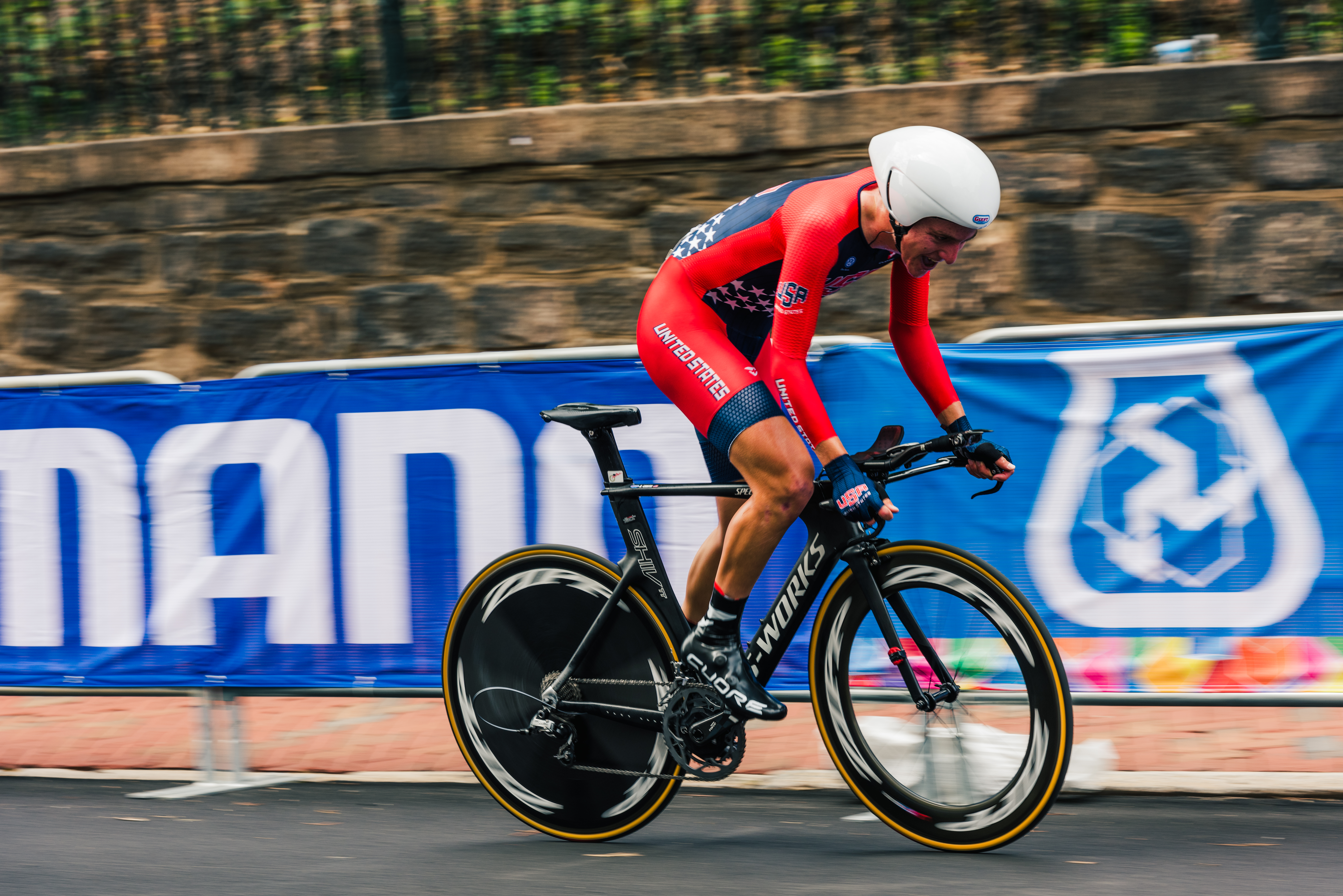
Adrien Costa won the silver medal

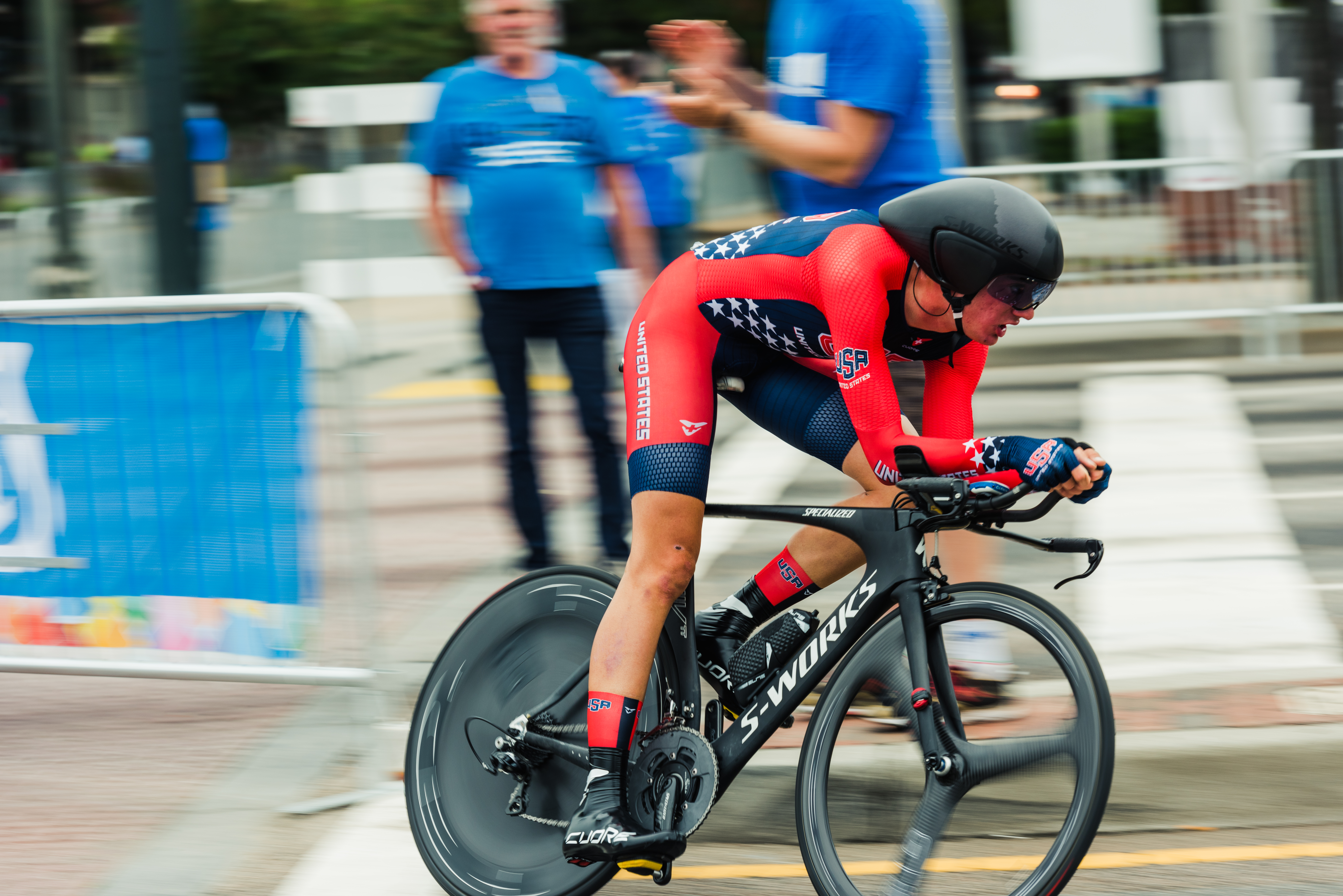
Brandon McNulty won the bronze medal

Rank	Rider	Time
1	(Germany) Leo Appelt (DEU)	37' 45.01"
2	(United States) Adrien Costa (USA)	+ 17.22"
3	(United States) Brandon McNulty (USA)	+ 59.74"
4	(South Africa) Keagan Girdlestone (RSA)	+ 1' 07.73"
5	(Switzerland) Gino Mäder (SUI)	+ 1' 11.38"
6	(Belgium) Jasper Philipsen (BEL)	+ 1' 22.48"
7	(Denmark) Niklas Larsen (DEN)	+ 1' 34.70"
8	(Norway) Tobias Foss (NOR)	+ 1' 35.73"
9	(Kazakhstan) Ilya Gorbushin (KAZ)	+ 1' 52.67"
10	(France) Alexys Brunel (FRA)	+ 1' 52.82"
11	(Latvia) Ēriks Toms Gavars (LAT)	+ 1' 57.81"
12	(Italy) Matteo Sobrero (ITA)	+ 2' 01.35"
13	(Australia) Michael Storer (AUS)	+ 2' 04.62"
14	(Colombia) Javier Montoya (COL)	+ 2' 07.57"
15	(Kazakhstan) Vadim Pronskiy (KAZ)	+ 2' 15.15"
16	(Colombia) Julian Cardona (COL)	+ 2' 16.07"
17	(Belgium) Stan Dewulf (BEL)	+ 2' 16.10"
18	(Russia) Pavel Sivakov (RUS)	+ 2' 18.68"
19	(Poland) Szymon Sajnok (POL)	+ 2' 20.32"
20	(Norway) Torjus Sleen (NOR)	+ 2' 29.71"
21	(New Zealand) Robert Stannard (NZL)	+ 2' 30.33"
22	(Russia) Nikolay Ilichev (RUS)	+ 2' 30.72"
23	(Spain) Pablo Alonso (ESP)	+ 2' 35.13"
24	(New Zealand) James Fouché (NZL)	+ 2' 38.24"
25	(Germany) Max Singer (DEU)	+ 2' 45.33"
26	(France) Louis Louvet (FRA)	+ 2' 49.95"
27	(Canada) Derek Gee (CAN)	+ 2' 54.67"
28	(Switzerland) Stefan Bissegger (SUI)	+ 2' 57.87"
29	(Czech Republic) Jakub Otruba (CZE)	+ 3' 04.92"
30	(Morocco) El Mehdi Chokri (MAR)	+ 3' 10.58"
31	(Russia) Sergey Rostovtsev (RUS)	+ 3' 10.84"
32	(Denmark) Anthon Charmig (DNK)	+ 3' 11.09"
33	(Italy) Nicola Conci (ITA)	+ 3' 15.33"
34	(Austria) Felix Gall (AUT)	+ 3' 16.75"
35	(Austria) Patrick Gamper (AUT)	+ 3' 21.85"
36	(Sweden) Gustav Andersson (SWE)	+ 3' 24.55"
37	(Morocco) Mouhcine El Kouraji (MAR)	+ 3' 56.79"
38	(Republic of Ireland) Michael O'Loughlin (IRL)	+ 3' 59.72"
39	(Algeria) Islam Mansouri (ALG)	+ 4' 02.51"
40	(Bosnia and Herzegovina) Antonio Barać (BIH)	+ 4' 09.81"
41	(Hungary) Dávid Kovács (HUN)	+ 4' 17.08"
42	(South Africa) Greg de Vink (RSA)	+ 4' 23.28"
43	(Republic of Ireland) Simon Tuomey (IRL)	+ 4' 28.72"
44	(Japan) Masahiro Ishigami (JPN)	+ 4' 31.70"
45	(Japan) Keitaro Sawada (JPN)	+ 4' 36.50"
46	(Canada) Joel Taylor (CAN)	+ 4' 36.52"
47	(Australia) Harry Sweeny (AUS)	+ 4' 52.25"
48	(Mongolia) Tegsh-Bayar Batsaikhan (MGL)	+ 5' 12.00"
49	(Ecuador) Erik Sierra (ECU)	+ 5' 44.51"
50	(Argentina) Santiago Yeri (ARG)	+ 6' 25.22"
51	(Ecuador) Bryan Portilla (ECU)	+ 6' 32.91"
52	(Brazil) Pedro Monteiro (BRA)	+ 6' 37.63"
53	(Algeria) Oussama Mansouri (ALG)	+ 6' 38.48"
54	(Thailand) Patompob Phonarjthan (THA)	+ 7' 09.00"
55	(Brazil) Márcio José Pessoa (BRA)	+ 7' 17.98"
56	(Japan) Yuttana Mano (JPN)	+ 8' 52.07"
57	(Singapore) Merrill Chua (SIN)	+ 9' 31.86"
