= Yudai Nitta =

Japanese cyclist

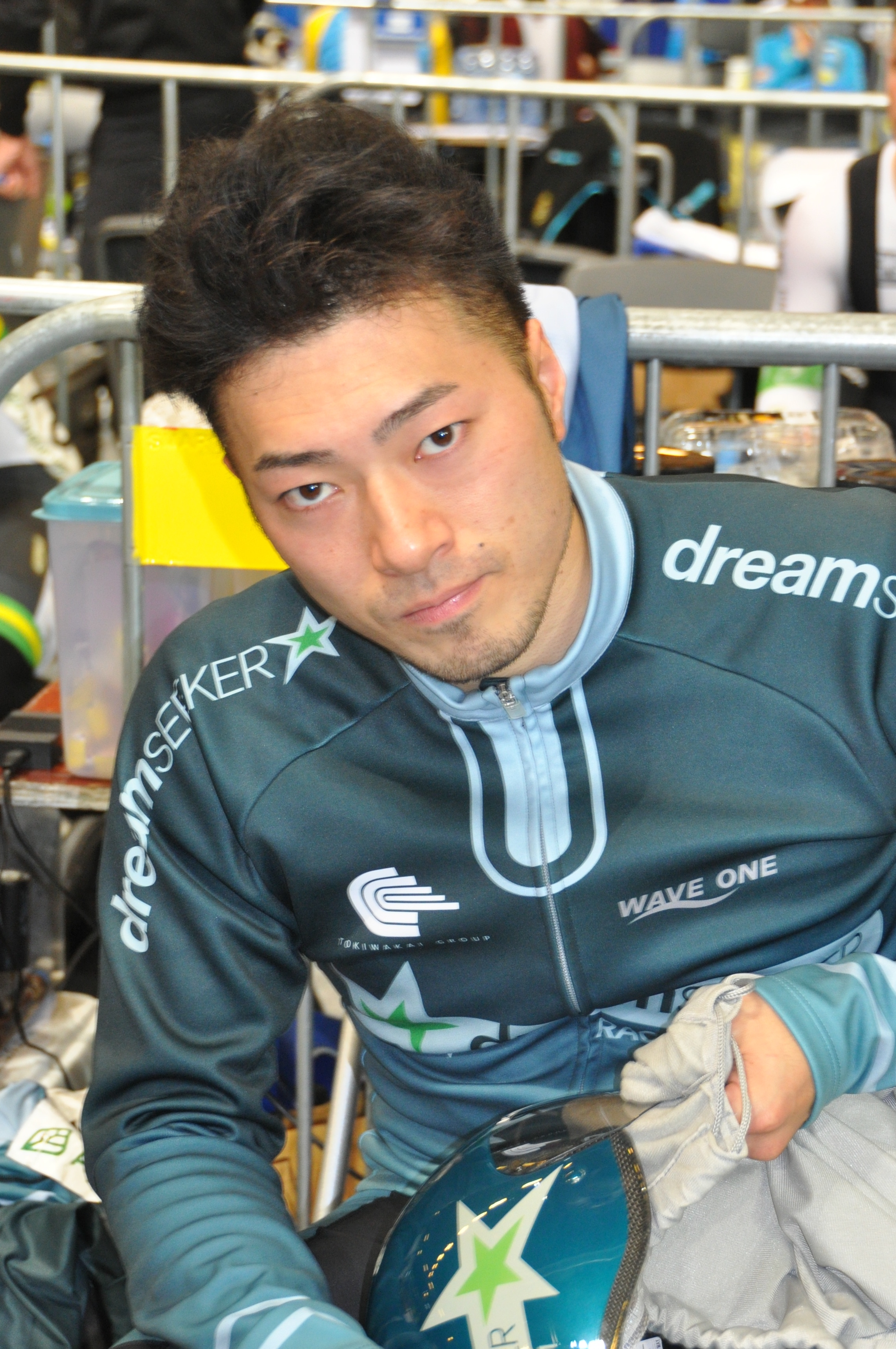
- Yudai Nitta at the 2016/2017 UCI Track World Cup in Apeldoorn, the Netherlands

Personal information
- Born: 25 January 1986 (age 40) Aizuwakamatsu, Japan
- Height: 1.73 m (5 ft 8 in)
- Weight: 77 kg (170 lb)

Cycling career
- Sport: Cycling
- Discipline: Track cycling
- Role: Rider
Medal record
Men's track cycling
Representing Japan
World Championships
Silver medal – second place	2019 Pruszków	Keirin
Asian Games
Gold medal – first place	2006 Doha	Team sprint
Silver medal – second place	2010 Guangzhou	Team sprint
Silver medal – second place	2018 Jakarta-Palembang	Keirin
Bronze medal – third place	2010 Guangzhou	Sprint
Bronze medal – third place	2018 Jakarta-Palembang	Team sprint
Asian Championships
Gold medal – first place	2019 Jakarta	Team sprint
Silver medal – second place	2006 Kuala Lumpur	Team sprint
Silver medal – second place	2010 Sharjah	Team sprint
Silver medal – second place	2012 Kuala Lumpur	Team sprint
Silver medal – second place	2015 Nakhon Ratchasima	Team sprint
Bronze medal – third place	2008 Nara	1 km time trial
Bronze medal – third place	2008 Nara	Team sprint
Bronze medal – third place	2010 Sharjah	Sprint
Bronze medal – third place	2010 Sharjah	1 km time trial
Bronze medal – third place	2014 Astana	Team sprint
Bronze medal – third place	2020 Jincheon	Keirin

Yudai Nitta (新田祐大, Nitta Yūdai; born 25 January 1986) is a Japanese track cyclist. At the 2012 Summer Olympics, he competed in the Men's team sprint for the national team. He is also active in Japan as a keirin cyclist.

He has qualified to represent Japan at the 2020 Summer Olympics.

== Results in major competitions ==
- 8th 2012 Summer Olympics, Men's team sprint
- 13th 2012–2013 UCI Track Cycling World Cup Classic in Glasgow – Men's keirin
