= Keagan Girdlestone =

South African cyclist

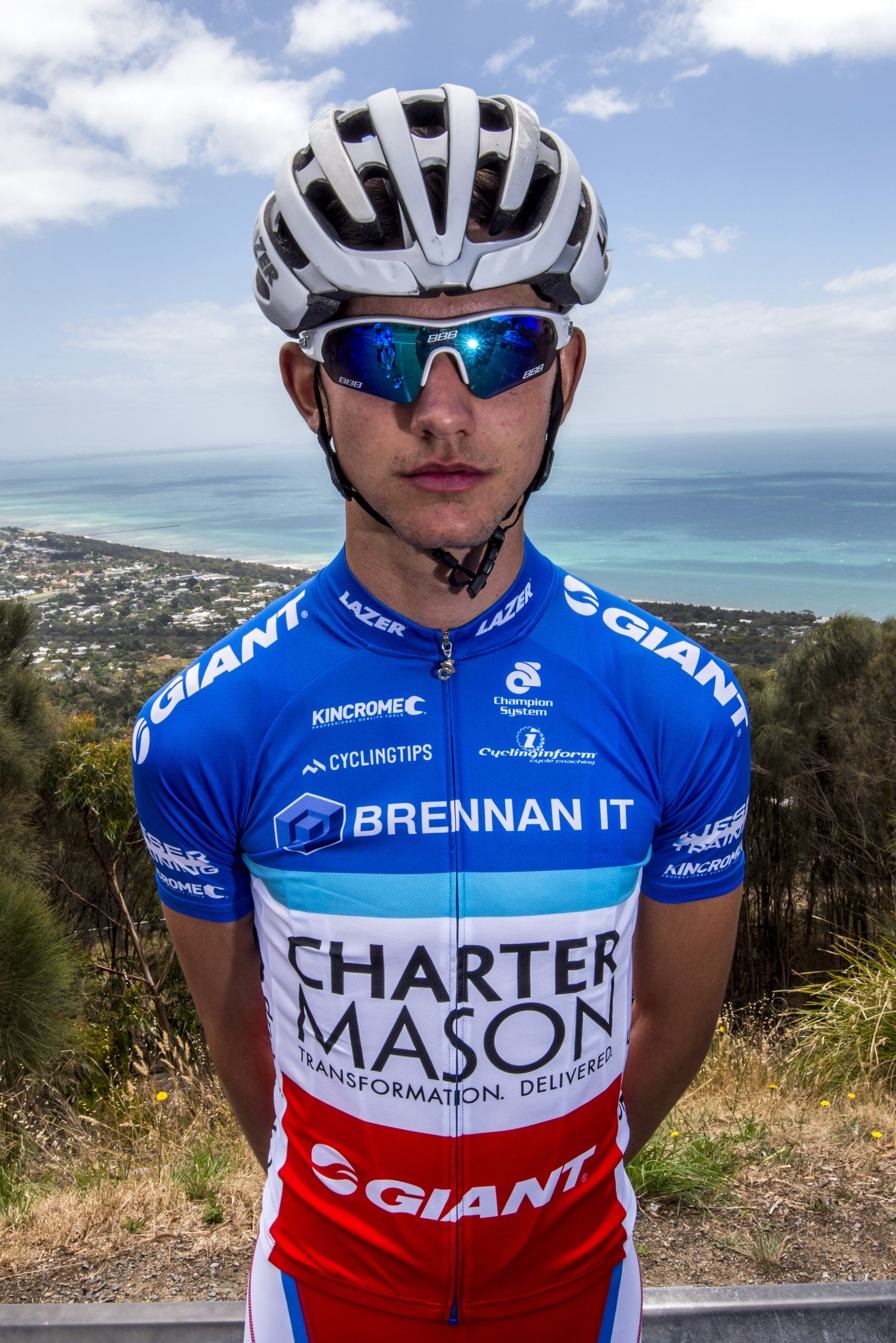

Personal information
- Full name: Keagan Girdlestone
- Born: 30 April 1997 (age 29)
- Height: 1.86 m (6 ft 1 in)
- Weight: 64 kg (141 lb)

Cycling career
- Sport: Cycling
- Discipline: Road
- Role: Rider
- Rider type: Time trialist

Amateur teams
- 2015: Team UC Nantes Atlantique Junior
- 2017: Team Ultra Racing
- 2018: Team Frezzor Racing

Professional team
- 2016: Dimension Data for Qhubeka

Keagan Girdlestone (born 30 April 1997) is a South African-New Zealand cyclist, who last rode for New Zealand amateur squad Team Frezzor Racing.

At the 2016 Coppa della Pace, Girdlestone crashed twice on a descent near Rimini, causing serious injuries. He was then transported to a hospital in critical condition. Due to this accident, the race was cancelled. Despite predictions by doctors that he would never race again, he competed in the 2017 Le Race (the event that he won in 2014) where he finished just inside the top 50.

== Major results ==
2015
1st Overall Ronde des Vallées

1st Stage 1

1st Overall Rhône Alpes-Valromey Tour

1st Stage 1

Oceania Junior Road Championships

2nd Time trial
4th Road race

4th Time trial, UCI Junior Road World Championships
2016
5th Time trial, South African National Road Championships
