= 2015 UCI Road World Championships – Women's time trial =

Women's time trial
2015 UCI Road World Championships
- Time trial Rainbow jersey

Race details
- Dates: September 22, 2015
- Stages: 1
- Distance: 29.9 km (18.6 mi)
- Winning time: 40' 29"

Medalists
	Gold	Linda Villumsen (NZL)
	Silver	Anna van der Breggen (NED)
	Bronze	Lisa Brennauer (GER)

The women's time trial of the 2015 UCI Road World Championships took place in and around in Richmond, Virginia, United States on September 22, 2015. The course of the race is 29.9 km (18.6 mi) with the start and finish in Richmond. Lisa Brennauer was the defending champion, after winning her first world time trial title in 2014.

New Zealand's Linda Villumsen won her first world title, after five previous medal finishes, by 2.54 seconds ahead of Anna van der Breggen of the Netherlands, while defending champion Brennauer finished in the bronze medal position, 5.26 seconds behind Villumsen. Australia's Katrin Garfoot finished just off the podium in fourth, 9.32 seconds off the winning time. Ellen van Dijk, one of the favorites, finished disappointingly seventh. A reason for her performance was that her rear wheel was not well attached in the frame. Her wheel ran into the frame, damaging her tire and puncturing her inner tube.

== Qualification ==
=== Qualification for the event ===
All National Federations were allowed to enter four riders for the race, with a maximum of two riders to start. In addition to this number, the outgoing World Champion and the current continental champions were also able to take part.

Champion	Name	Note
Outgoing World Champion	Lisa Brennauer (GER)	
Pan American Champion	Carmen Small (USA)	
European Champion (under-23)	Mieke Kröger (GER)	
African Champion	Ashleigh Moolman (RSA)	Did not participate
Asian Champion	Na Ah-reum (KOR)	Did not participate
Oceanian Champion	Katrin Garfoot (AUS)	

=== Olympic qualification ===
This time trial was also part of the qualification of the women's time trial at the 2016 Summer Olympics. The first ten nations in the time trial qualified one athlete.

== Course ==
The individual time trial was contested on a circuit of 15 km (9.3 mi) and has a total elevation of 96 meters (315 feet). The elite women rode two laps of the circuit.

The circuit was a technical course that went through the city of Richmond. From the start, the route headed west from downtown to Monument Avenue, a paver-lined, historic boulevard that's been named one of the "10 Great Streets in America." From there, the course made a 180-degree turn at N. Davis Avenue and continued in the opposite direction. The race then cut through the Uptown district before coming back through Virginia Commonwealth University and then crossing the James River. After a technical turnaround, the race came back across the river and worked its way through downtown Richmond, eventually heading up to ascend 300 meters (980 feet) on Governor Street. At the top, the riders had to take a sharp left turn onto the false-flat finishing straight, 680 meters (2,230 feet) to the finish.

== Schedule ==
All times are in Eastern Daylight Time (UTC−4).

Date	Time	Event
September 22, 2015	13:30–16:45	Women's time trial

== Participating nations ==
44 cyclists from 33 nations took part in the women's time trial. The number of cyclists per nation is shown in parentheses.

- Australia (1)
- Austria (1)
- Belgium (1)
- Belarus (1)
- Canada (2)
- Colombia (1)
- Czech Republic (1)
- Denmark (1)
- El Salvador (1)
- Spain (1)
- Finland (1)
- France (2)
- Great Britain (1)
- Germany (4)
- Ireland (1)
- Italy (1)
- Japan (1)
- Latvia (1)
- Lithuania (1)
- Luxembourg (1)
- Mexico (1)
- Mongolia (1)
- Netherlands (2)
- Norway (1)
- New Zealand (1)
- Poland (2)
- Russia (2)
- Rwanda (1)
- Saint Kitts and Nevis (1)
- Switzerland (1)
- Sweden (1)
- Ukraine (2)
- United States (3) (host)

== Final classification ==
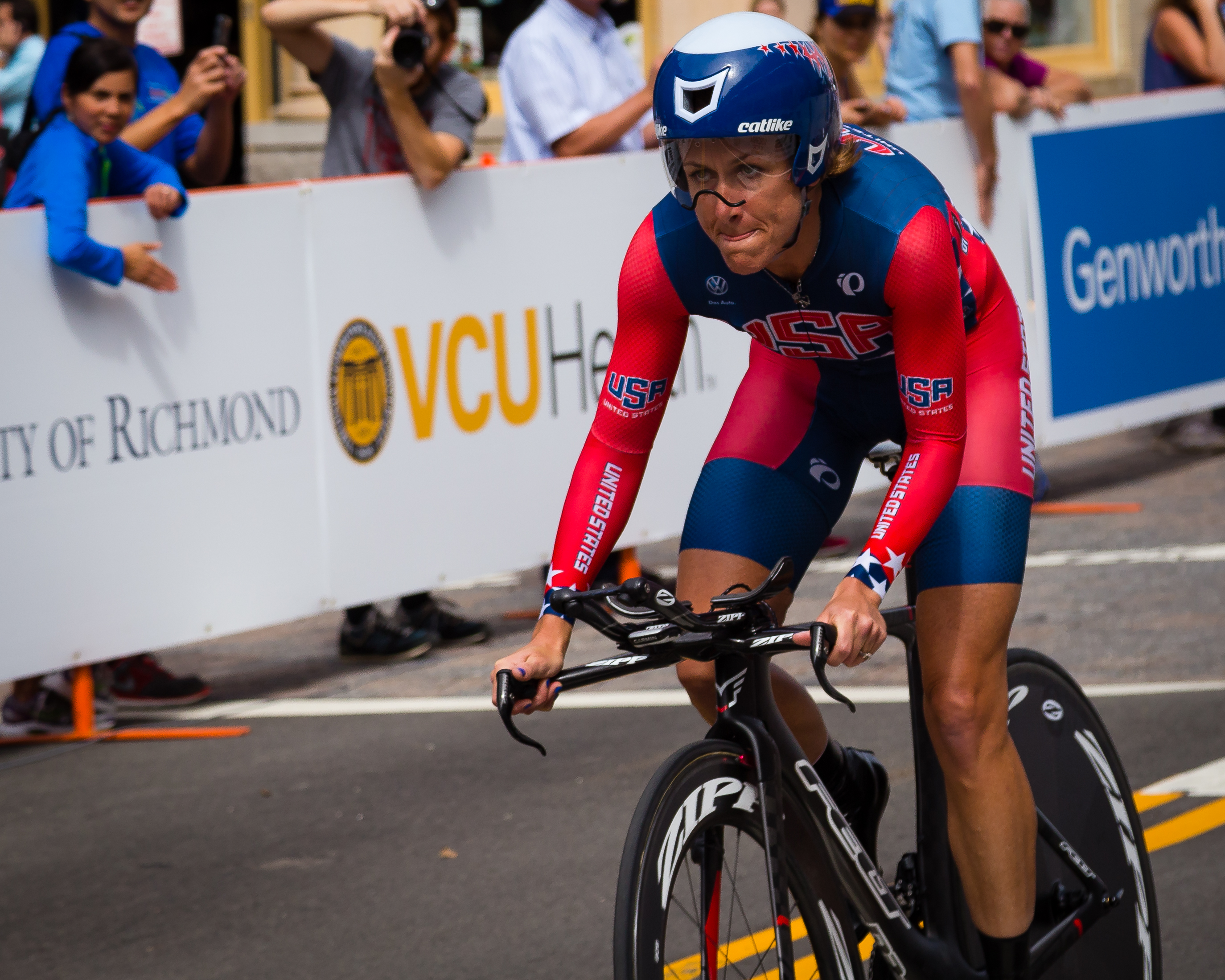
42 years old Kristin Armstrong was for a long time in the leading position

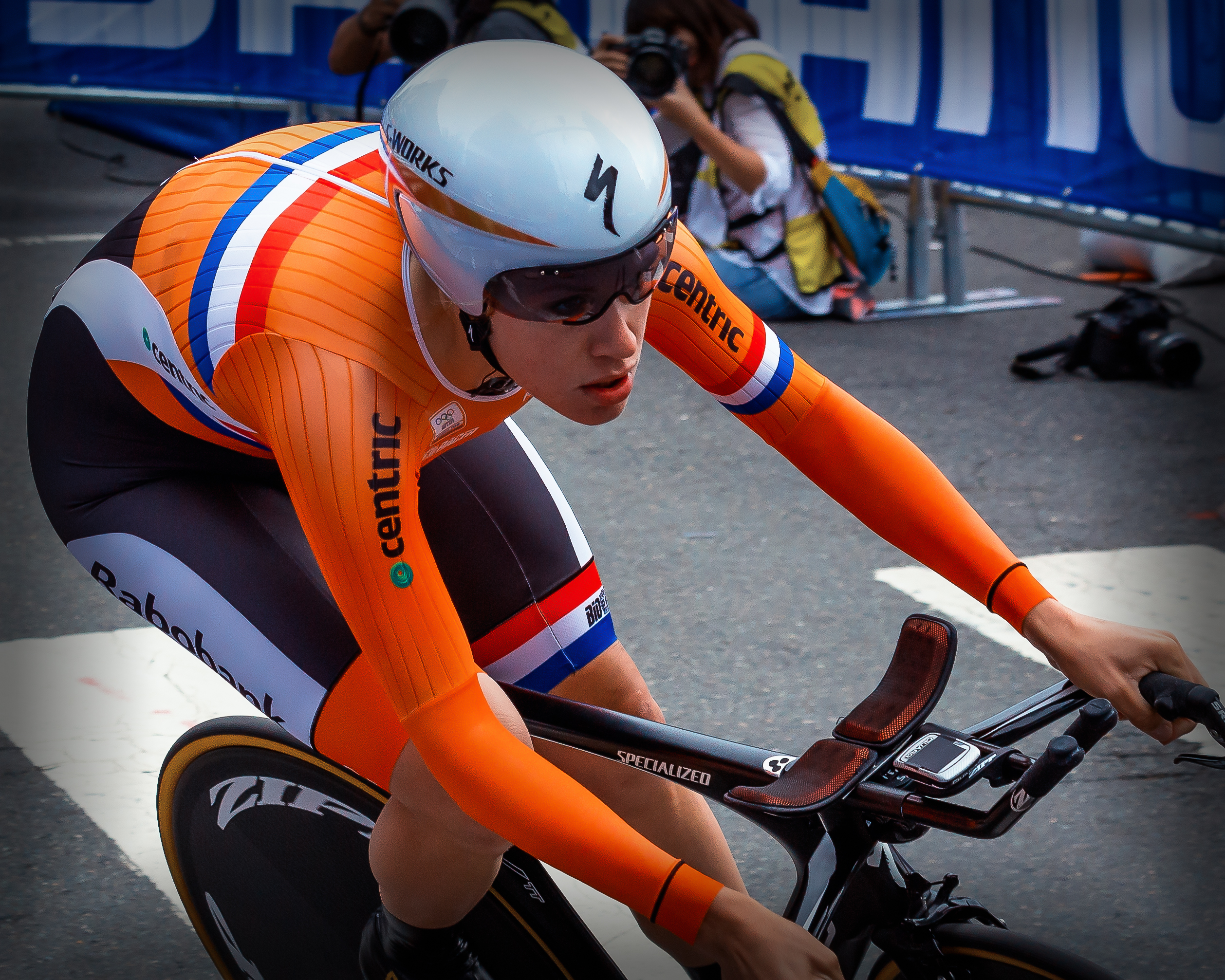
Ellen van Dijk, one of the favorites, had mechanical problems and finished disappointingly seventh

Rank	Rider	Country	Time
1	Linda Villumsen	New Zealand	40' 29"
2	Anna van der Breggen	Netherlands	+ 2"
3	Lisa Brennauer	Germany	+ 5"
4	Katrin Garfoot	Australia	+ 9"
5	Kristin Armstrong	United States	+ 20"
6	Evelyn Stevens	United States	+ 26"
7	Ellen van Dijk	Netherlands	+ 53"
8	Alena Amialiusik	Belarus	+ 1' 06"
9	Ann-Sophie Duyck	Belgium	+ 1' 19"
10	Trixi Worrack	Germany	+ 1' 19"
11	Tatiana Antoshina	Russia	+ 1' 21"
12	Martina Sáblíková	Czech Republic	+ 1' 21"
13	Tara Whitten	Canada	+ 1' 26"
14	Carmen Small	United States	+ 1' 27"
15	Karol-Ann Canuel	Canada	+ 1' 32"
16	Hanna Solovey	Ukraine	+ 1' 38"
17	Emma Johansson	Sweden	+ 1' 48"
18	Eri Yonamine	Japan	+ 2' 10"
19	Mieke Kröger	Germany	+ 2' 20"
20	Katarzyna Pawłowska	Poland	+ 2' 23"
21	Christine Majerus	Luxembourg	+ 2' 26"
22	Eugenia Bujak	Poland	+ 2' 29"
23	Audrey Cordon	France	+ 2' 39"
24	Doris Schweizer	Switzerland	+ 2' 42"
25	Cecilie Gotaas Johnsen	Norway	+ 2' 47"
26	Hayley Simmonds	United Kingdom	+ 2' 54"
27	Aude Biannic	France	+ 3' 11"
28	Siobhan Dervan	Ireland	+ 3' 16"
29	Martina Ritter	Austria	+ 3' 33"
30	Silvia Valsecchi	Italy	+ 3' 34"
31	Svetlana Vasilieva	Russia	+ 3' 49"
32	Lotta Lepistö	Finland	+ 3' 54"
33	Corinna Lechner	Germany	+ 3' 56"
34	Kathryn Bertine	Saint Kitts and Nevis	+ 4' 07"
35	Evelyn García	El Salvador	+ 4' 09"
36	Daiva Tušlaitė	Lithuania	+ 4' 11"
37	Lija Laizāne	Latvia	+ 4' 12"
38	Tüvshinjargalyn Enkhjargal	Mongolia	+ 4' 15"
39	Olga Shekel	Ukraine	+ 4' 16"
40	Sheyla Gutiérrez	Spain	+ 4' 40"
41	Camilla Møllebro	Denmark	+ 4' 49"
42	Íngrid Drexel	Mexico	+ 5' 24"
43	Sérika Gulumá	Colombia	+ 5' 52"
44	Jeanne D'arc Girubuntu	Rwanda	+ 7' 11"
