= Cycling at the 2016 Summer Olympics – Qualification =

For the cycling competitions at the 2016 Summer Olympics, the following qualification systems are in place.

== Summary ==
=== Track cycling ===
An NOC is entitled to enter a single team in each of the four team events. An NOC without a team in the relevant team event may qualify up to two places in sprint and keirin, and one place in omnium; an NOC with a team may enter that number from its team resources, for a total of twenty three quota places, an increase from the 2012 games which had a one rider per event limit in sprint and keirin; however, a limit of 15 riders (8 men, 7 women ) is placed on each NOC, with the possibility of drafting in two further riders from other cycling events. For certain countries, therefore, the number of quota places earned will significantly exceed the numbers of riders qualified; in effect, members of team events will 'double up', for team sprint athletes in sprint and keirin, and team pursuit athletes in omnium.

=== Road cycling ===
Similarly, the cyclists who compete in the road time trial must also compete in the road race event; thus an NOC may win 2 quota places, but be allowed to take only one rider.

Nation	Road				Track										MTB		BMX		Total	
Nation	Men		Women		Men					Women					M	W	M	W	Q	R
Nation	RR	TT	RR	TT	TS	KE	SP	TP	OM	TS	KE	SP	TP	OM	M	W	M	W	Q	R
Algeria	2	1																	3	2
Argentina	3	1													1		1	1	7	6
Australia	4	2	4	2	X	2	2	X	X	X	2	2	X	X	2	1	3	2	34	31
Austria	2	1	1												1				5	4
Azerbaijan	1		1								1	1							4	3
Belarus	2	2	1	1										X					7	4
Belgium	5	2	3	2					X					X	2	1		1	18	14
Bolivia	1																		1	1
Brazil	2		2						X						2	1	1	1	10	10
Bulgaria	1																		1	1
Canada	3	1	3	2		1				X	2	2	X	X	2	2	1		22	19
Chile	1		1																2	2
China							1	X		X	2	2	X	X	1	1			11	14
Colombia	5	1	1			1	1		X		1	1			1		2	1	16	15
Costa Rica	1														1				2	2
Croatia	2																		2	2
Cuba			1								1	1		X					4	3
Cyprus			1																1	1
Czech Republic	4	2				1	2								3	1			14	12
Denmark	3	1						X	X					X	1	1	1	1	11	13
Dominican Republic	1																		1	1
Ecuador	1																1		2	2
Egypt												1							1	1
Eritrea	1																		1	1
Estonia	2																		2	2
Ethiopia	1																		1	1
Finland			1																1	1
France	4	2	2	1	X	2	2		X	X	2	2		X	3	2	3	1	30	22
Germany	4	2	4	2	X	2	2	X	X	X	2	2	X	X	2	2	1	1	32	29
Great Britain	5	1	3	1	X	2	2	X	X		1	2	X	X	1		2		24	26
Greece	1					1									1				3	3
Guam															1				1	1
Guatemala	1																		1	1
Hong Kong	1								X		1	1		X	1				6	5
Hungary															1				1	1
Indonesia																	1		1	1
Iran	3	1																	4	3
Ireland	2										1								3	3
Israel			1												1				2	2
Italy	5	2	4	1		1			X				X		3	1			19	19
Japan	2		1	1		1	1		X					X	1		1		10	9
Kazakhstan	2	1							X										4	3
Kosovo	1																		1	1
Laos	1																		1	1
Latvia	2																2		4	4
Lesotho															1				1	1
Lithuania	2		1								1	1							5	4
Luxembourg	1		2	1															4	3
Malaysia						1						1							2	2
Mauritius															1				1	1
Mexico	1		1						X							1			4	4
Morocco	3	1																	4	3
Namibia	1		1													1			3	3
Netherlands	4	2	4	2	X	2	2	X	X	X	2	2		X	1		3	2	31	25
New Zealand	2	1	1	1	X	2	2	X	X	X	2	2	X	X	1		1		20	19
Norway	4	1	1	1												1	1		9	7
Poland	4	2	3	2	X	2	2						X	X		2			20	17
Portugal	4	1													2				7	6
Puerto Rico	1																		1	1
Romania	1																		1	1
Russia	3	1	1	1		1	2	X		X	2	2			1	1	1	1	19	16
Rwanda	1														1				2	2
Serbia	1															1			2	2
Slovakia	1														1				2	2
Slovenia	4	1	1													2			8	7
South Africa	2		2	1											2		1		8	7
South Korea	2		1		X	2	2		X		1								10	8
Spain	5	2	1				1			X	2	2			3				17	12
Sweden			3													1			4	4
Switzerland	3	1	1					X	X						3	2	1		13	15
Chinese Taipei			1											X					2	2
Thailand			1															1	2	2
Timor-Leste																1			1	1
Trinidad and Tobago							1												1	1
Tunisia	1																		1	1
Turkey	2	1																	3	2
Ukraine	3	1	1	1							1					2			9	7
United Arab Emirates	1																		1	1
United States	2	2	4	2		1			X				X	X	1	2	3	2	22	21
Venezuela	2	1	1		X	2	2							X			1	1	10	9
Total: 80 NOCs	144	40	67	25	9	27	27	9	18	9	27	27	9	18	50	30	32	16	581	520

Legend

- TS – Team Sprint
- KE – Keirin
- SP – Sprint
- TP – Team Pursuit
- OM – Omnium
- RR – Road Race
- TT – Individual Time Trial
- Q – Quotas
- R – Riders

== Timeline ==
The following is a timeline of the qualification events for the cycling events at the 2016 Summer Olympics.

Event	Date	Venue
Road
2015 African Continental Championships (men)	February 9–14, 2015	Wartburg, South Africa
2015 Asian Cycling Championships (men)	February 10–14, 2015	Nakhon Ratchasima, Thailand
2015 Pan American Road Cycling Championships (men)	May 7–10, 2015	León, Mexico
2015 UCI Road World Championships	September 19–27, 2015	Richmond, United States
2015 UCI World Tour	October 4, 2015	—N/a
2015 UCI Africa Tour	January 1, 2016	—N/a
2015 UCI America Tour	January 1, 2016	—N/a
2015 UCI Asia Tour	January 1, 2016	—N/a
2015 UCI Europe Tour	January 1, 2016	—N/a
2015 UCI Oceania Tour	January 1, 2016	—N/a
2016 Asian Cycling Championships (women)	January 19–24, 2016	Tokyo, Japan
2016 African Continental Championships (women)	February 22–26, 2016	Casablanca, Morocco
2016 Pan American Road Cycling Championships (women)	May 26–28, 2016	San Cristóbal, Venezuela
2015–2016 UCI World Ranking (women)	May 31, 2016	—N/a
Track
Close of the UCI Olympic Track Ranking 2014–2016 (at end of 2016 UCI Track Cycling World Championships)	March 6, 2016	London, United Kingdom
Mountain biking
2015 Oceania Continental Championships	February 26–27, 2015	Toowoomba, Australia
2015 Pan American Continental Championships	March 27–29, 2015	Cota, Colombia
2015 African Continental Championships	May 5–10, 2015	Musanze, Rwanda
2015 Asian Cycling Championships	August 12–16, 2015	Melaka, Malaysia
Establishment of the UCI Olympic qualification ranking	May 25, 2016	—N/a
BMX
2016 UCI BMX World Championships	May 25–29, 2016	Medellín, Colombia
Establishment of the UCI Rankings by Nation	May 31, 2016	—N/a

== Road cycling ==
=== Men's road race ===
Event	Ranking by nation	Qualified	Athletes per NOC
Host nation	—N/a	Brazil	2
2015 UCI World Tour	1st	Spain	5
2015 UCI World Tour	2nd	Italy	5
2015 UCI World Tour	3rd	Colombia	5
2015 UCI World Tour	4th	Great Britain	5
2015 UCI World Tour	5th	Belgium	5
2015 UCI World Tour	6th	France	4
2015 UCI World Tour	7th	Netherlands	4
2015 UCI World Tour	8th	Australia	3*
2015 UCI World Tour	9th	Germany	4
2015 UCI World Tour	10th	Norway	1*
2015 UCI World Tour	11th	Poland	3*
2015 UCI World Tour	12th	Portugal	4
2015 UCI World Tour	13th	Czech Republic	3*
2015 UCI World Tour	14th	Slovenia	3*
2015 UCI World Tour	15th	Switzerland	4
2015 UCI World Tour	Individual	Slovakia	1
2015 UCI World Tour	Individual	Luxembourg	1
UCI Africa Tour	1st	Morocco	3
UCI Africa Tour	2nd	Algeria	2
UCI Africa Tour	3rd	South Africa	1**
UCI Africa Tour	4th	Eritrea	1**
UCI Africa Tour	Individual	Tunisia	1
UCI Africa Tour	Individual	Rwanda	1
UCI America Tour	1st	Canada	3
UCI America Tour	2nd	Argentina	3
UCI America Tour	3rd	Venezuela	2**
UCI America Tour	4th	United States	1**
UCI America Tour	5th	Costa Rica	1**
UCI America Tour	Individual	Ecuador	1
UCI America Tour	Individual	Guatemala	1
UCI America Tour	Individual	Chile	1
UCI Asia Tour	1st	Iran	3
UCI Asia Tour	2nd	Kazakhstan	2
UCI Asia Tour	3rd	Japan	2
UCI Asia Tour	4th	South Korea	2
UCI Europe Tour	1st	Ukraine	3
UCI Europe Tour	2nd	Slovenia	1***
UCI Europe Tour	3rd	Russia	3
UCI Europe Tour	4th	Denmark	3
UCI Europe Tour	5th	Norway	3***
UCI Europe Tour	6th	Poland	1***
UCI Europe Tour	7th	Austria	2
UCI Europe Tour	8th	Belarus	2
UCI Europe Tour	9th	Turkey	2
UCI Europe Tour	10th	Czech Republic	1***
UCI Europe Tour	11th	Lithuania	2
UCI Europe Tour	12th	Estonia	2
UCI Europe Tour	13th	Ireland	2
UCI Europe Tour	14th	Latvia	2
UCI Europe Tour	15th	Croatia	2
UCI Europe Tour	16th	~~Sweden~~	2
UCI Europe Tour	Individual	Azerbaijan	1
UCI Europe Tour	Individual	Serbia	1
UCI Europe Tour	Individual	Greece	1
UCI Europe Tour	Individual	Bulgaria	1
UCI Europe Tour	Individual	Romania	1
UCI Oceania Tour	1st	New Zealand	2
2015 African Championships	1st	Ethiopia	1
2015 African Championships	2nd	Namibia	1
2015 Asian Championships	1st	United Arab Emirates	1
2015 Asian Championships	2nd	Hong Kong	1
2015 Pan American Championships	1st	Mexico	1
2015 Pan American Championships	2nd	Dominican Republic	1
Re-allocation of unused quota		Puerto Rico	1
Re-allocation of unused quota		South Africa	1
Re-allocation of unused quota		United States	1
Tripartite Commission Invitation		Bolivia	1
Tripartite Commission Invitation		Kosovo	1
Tripartite Commission Invitation		Laos	1
Total			144

* Quota reduced to the number of riders in the ranking of the respective tour

** Quota reduced by one to accommodate for the individual qualifiers on the same tour

*** Additional quota places earned on the continental tour for countries with quota reduction due to lack of ranked riders on the world tour

=== Men's individual time trial ===
Event	Ranking by nation	Qualified	Athletes per NOC
2015 UCI World Tour	1st	Spain	1
2015 UCI World Tour	2nd	Italy	1
2015 UCI World Tour	3rd	Colombia	1
2015 UCI World Tour	4th	Great Britain	1
2015 UCI World Tour	5th	Belgium	1
2015 UCI World Tour	6th	France	1
2015 UCI World Tour	7th	Netherlands	1
2015 UCI World Tour	8th	Australia	1
2015 UCI World Tour	9th	Germany	1
2015 UCI World Tour	10th	Norway	1
2015 UCI World Tour	11th	Poland	1
2015 UCI World Tour	12th	Portugal	1
2015 UCI World Tour	13th	Czech Republic	1
2015 UCI World Tour	14th	Slovenia	1
2015 UCI World Tour	15th	Switzerland	1
UCI Africa Tour	1st	Morocco	1
UCI Africa Tour	2nd	Algeria	1
UCI America Tour	1st	Canada	1
UCI America Tour	2nd	Argentina	1
UCI America Tour	3rd	Venezuela	1
UCI America Tour	4th	United States	1
UCI Asia Tour	1st	Iran	1
UCI Asia Tour	2nd	Kazakhstan	1
UCI Europe Tour	1st	Ukraine	1
UCI Europe Tour	2nd	Russia	1
UCI Europe Tour	3rd	Denmark	1
UCI Europe Tour	4th	Austria	1
UCI Europe Tour	5th	Belarus	1
UCI Europe Tour	6th	Turkey	1
UCI Oceania Tour	1st	New Zealand	1
2015 UCI World Championships	1st	Belarus	1
2015 UCI World Championships	2nd	Italy	1
2015 UCI World Championships	3rd	France	1
2015 UCI World Championships	4th	Spain	1
2015 UCI World Championships	5th	Netherlands	1
2015 UCI World Championships	6th	Australia	1
2015 UCI World Championships	7th	Germany	1
2015 UCI World Championships	8th	Poland	1
2015 UCI World Championships	9th	Czech Republic	1
2015 UCI World Championships	10th	United States	1
Total			40

=== Women's road race ===
Event	Ranking by nation	Qualified	Athletes per NOC
Host nation	—N/a	Brazil	1
2016 UCI World Ranking	1 to 5	Netherlands; United States; Italy; Australia; Germany	4
2016 UCI World Ranking	6 to 13	Poland; Sweden; Great Britain; Canada; Belgium	3
2016 UCI World Ranking	6 to 13	France; South Africa; Luxembourg	2*
2016 UCI World Ranking	14 to 22	Russia; Ukraine; Belarus; Finland; Cuba; New Zealand; Mexico; Switzerland; Spain	1*
2016 UCI World Ranking	Individual top 100	Chinese Taipei; Norway; Brazil; Azerbaijan; Thailand; Austria; Slovenia; Lithuania; Cyprus; Israel; Japan; Chile	1
2016 African Championships	1st	Namibia	1
2016 Pan American Championships	1st	Venezuela	1
2016 Asian Championships	1st	South Korea	1
Re-allocation of unused host quota		Colombia	1
Total			68

* Quota reduced by one to accommodate for the individual qualifiers on the same tour

=== Women's individual time trial ===
Event	Ranking by nation	Qualified	Athletes per NOC
2016 UCI World Ranking	1 to 15	Netherlands; United States; Italy; Australia; Germany; Poland; ~~Sweden~~; Great Britain; Canada; Belgium; France; South Africa; Luxembourg; Russia; Ukraine	1
2015 UCI World Championships	1 to 10	New Zealand; Netherlands; Germany; Australia; United States; Belarus; Belgium; Canada; ~~Sweden~~; Japan; Poland; Norway	1
Total			25

== Track cycling ==
=== Men's team sprint ===
Teams must be composed of 3 riders.

Event	Ranking by Nation	Qualified NOC	Teams per NOC
2014–2016 Olympic track ranking	1 to 9	Germany; France; Netherlands; Great Britain; Australia; New Zealand; Poland; Venezuela; South Korea	1
Total			9

=== Men's sprint ===
Event	Ranking by Nation	Qualified NOC	Athletes per NOC
2014–2016 Olympic track ranking	1 to 9	Russia; Colombia; China; Czech Republic; Trinidad and Tobago; Japan; Spain; Russia; Czech Republic	1
NOCs qualified for Team Sprint		Germany; France; Netherlands; Great Britain; Australia; New Zealand; Poland; Venezuela; South Korea	up to 2
Total			27

=== Men's Keirin ===
Event	Ranking by Nation	Qualified NOC	Athletes per NOC
2014–2016 Olympic track ranking	1 to 9	Colombia; United States; Malaysia; Russia; Canada; Japan; Greece; Czech Republic; ~~Italy~~; Japan	1
NOCs qualified for Team Sprint		Germany; France; Netherlands; Great Britain; Australia; New Zealand; Poland; Venezuela; South Korea	2
Total			27

=== Men's team pursuit ===
Teams must be composed of 4 riders.

Event	Ranking by Nation	Qualified NOC	Teams per NOC
2014–2016 Olympic track ranking	1 to 9	Australia; Great Britain; New Zealand; Germany; Denmark; Switzerland; Italy; Netherlands; China	1
Total			9

=== Men's Omnium ===
Event	Ranking by Nation	Qualified NOC	Athletes per NOC
2014–2016 Olympic track ranking	1 to 18	Australia; Colombia; Germany; Italy; Denmark; Great Britain; New Zealand; France; Belgium; Netherlands; Switzerland; United States; Japan; Brazil; Hong Kong; Kazakhstan; Mexico; South Korea	1
Total			18

=== Women's team sprint ===
Teams must be composed of 2 riders.

Event	Ranking by Nation	Qualified NOC	Teams per NOC
2014–2016 Olympic track ranking	1 to 9	China; Russia; Australia; Germany; Netherlands; Spain; France; Canada; New Zealand	1
Total			9

=== Women's sprint ===
Event	Ranking by Nation	Qualified NOC	Athletes per NOC
2014–2016 Olympic track ranking	1 to 9	Hong Kong; Lithuania; Cuba; Great Britain; Azerbaijan; Great Britain; Malaysia; Colombia; Egypt	1
NOCs qualified for Team Sprint		China; Russia; Australia; Germany; Netherlands; Spain; France; Canada; New Zealand	up to 2
Total			27

=== Women's Keirin ===
Event	Ranking by Nation	Qualified NOC	Athletes per NOC
2014–2016 Olympic track ranking	1 to 9	Hong Kong; South Korea; Lithuania; Cuba; Ukraine; Colombia; Ireland; Great Britain; Azerbaijan	1
NOCs qualified for Team Sprint		China; Russia; Australia; Germany; Netherlands; Spain; France; Canada; New Zealand	up to 2
Total			27

=== Women's team pursuit ===
Teams must be composed of 4 riders.

Event	Ranking by Nation	Qualified	Teams per NOC
2014–2016 Olympic track ranking	1 to 9	Great Britain; Canada; Australia; China; United States; New Zealand; Italy; Germany; Poland	1
Total			9

=== Women's Omnium ===
Event	Ranking by Nation	Qualified	Athletes per NOC
2014–2016 Olympic track ranking	1 to 18	Great Britain; Netherlands; United States; Belgium; Australia; France; Cuba; Belarus; Denmark; Poland; Germany; Canada; New Zealand; China; Hong Kong; Chinese Taipei; Venezuela; Japan	1
Total			18

== Mountain biking ==
=== Men's cross-country race ===
Event	Ranking by nation	Qualified	Athletes per NOC
2016 UCI Olympic qualification ranking	1 to 5	Switzerland; France; Spain; Czech Republic; Italy	3
2016 UCI Olympic qualification ranking	6 to 13	Germany; Netherlands*; Australia; Belgium; Canada; Portugal; South Africa; Brazil	2
2016 UCI Olympic qualification ranking	14 to 26	Austria; Slovakia; United States; Argentina; New Zealand; Denmark; ~~Sweden~~; Greece; Israel; Japan; Hungary; Russia; Great Britain	1
2015 African Championships	1 to 2	Mauritius; Rwanda	1
2015 Pan American Championships	1 to 2	Colombia; Costa Rica	1
2015 Asian Championships	1 to 2	China; Hong Kong	1
Oceania	1	Guam	1
Tripartite Commission Invitation	1	Lesotho	1
Total			50

=== Women's cross-country race ===
Event	Ranking by nation	Qualified	Athletes per NOC
2016 UCI Olympic qualification ranking	1 to 8	Switzerland; Germany; Canada; France; United States; Slovenia; Poland; Ukraine	2
2016 UCI Olympic qualification ranking	9 to 19	Russia; Norway; Denmark; Belgium; Brazil; Italy; Australia; Sweden; Serbia; Czech Republic	1
2015 African Championships	1	~~South Africa~~^{1} Namibia	1
2015 Pan American Championships	1	Mexico	1
2015 Asian Championships	1	China	1
2015 Oceania Championships	1	~~New Zealand~~	1
Tripartite Commission Invitation	1	Timor-Leste	1
Total			30

^1 – South Africa won the continental quotas in men's and women's mountain bike, but decided not to accept them. South African sports confederation and Olympic Committee (SASCOC) and Cycling South Africa (CSA) made an agreement on the Rio 2016 Olympics qualification criteria that the Continental Qualification route will not be considered.

== BMX ==
=== Men's BMX ===
Event	Ranking by nation	Qualified	Athletes per NOC
UCI Olympic qualification ranking	1 to 4	United States; Netherlands; Australia; France	3
UCI Olympic qualification ranking	5 to 7	Great Britain; Latvia; Colombia	2
UCI Olympic qualification ranking	8 to 13	Argentina; Switzerland; Canada; New Zealand; Brazil; Japan	1
UCI BMX individual ranking	1 to 4	Ecuador; Russia; Germany; Norway	1
2016 UCI BMX World Championships	1 to 3	Venezuela; South Africa; Denmark	1
Re-allocation of unused host quota		Indonesia	1
Total			32

=== Women's BMX ===
Event	Ranking by nation	Qualified	Athletes per NOC
UCI Olympic qualification ranking	1 to 3	Australia; United States; Netherlands	2
UCI Olympic qualification ranking	4 to 7	Colombia; France; Venezuela; Russia	1
UCI BMX individual ranking	1 to 3	Belgium; Denmark; Argentina	1
2016 UCI BMX World Championships	1 to 2	Germany; Brazil	1
Re-allocation of unused host quota		Thailand	1
Total			16
