= 2015 UCI Road World Championships =

Cycling world championships

- Location within Virginia Location within the United States
- Venue: Richmond, Virginia, United States
- Date: September 19–27, 2015
- Coordinates: 37°32′N 77°28′W
- Events: 12

The 2015 UCI Road World Championships took place in Richmond, Virginia, United States from September 19–27, 2015. It was the 88th Road World Championships. Peter Sagan won the men's road race and Lizzie Armitstead won the women's road race.

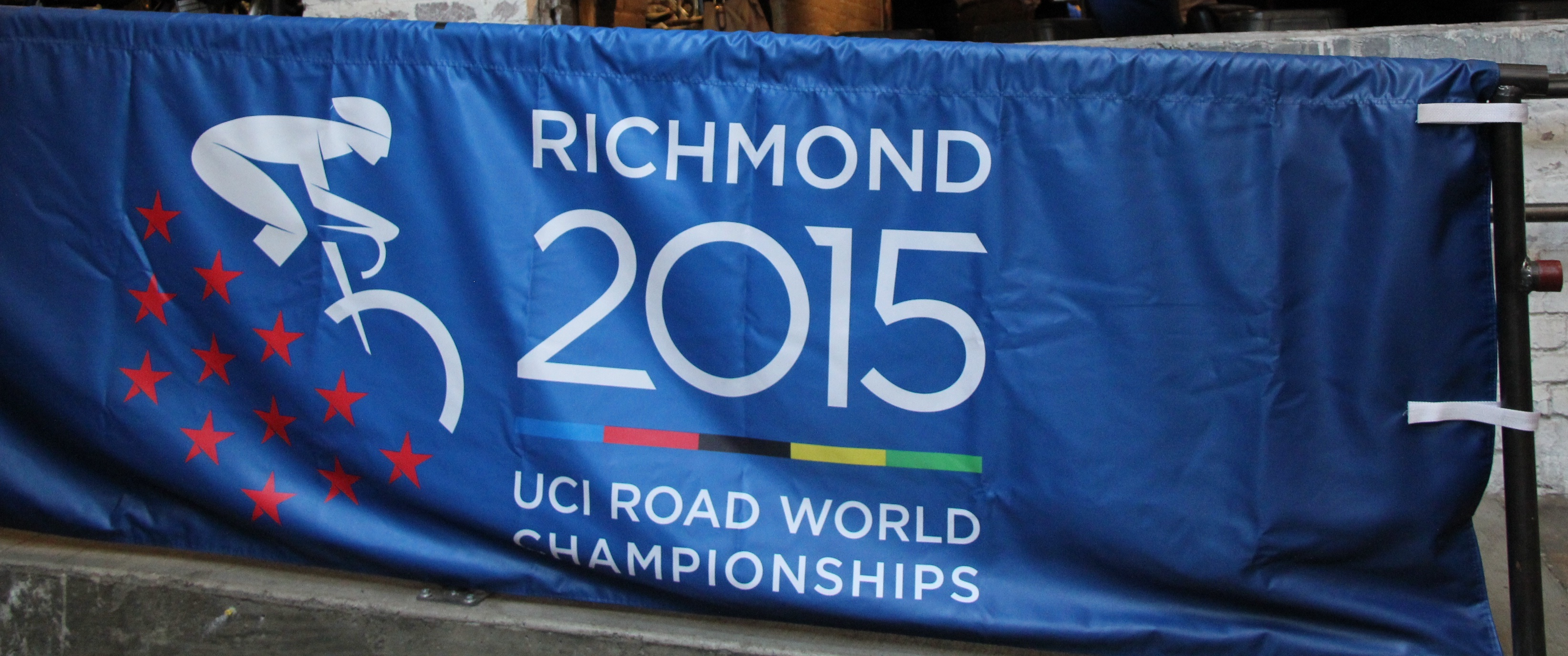
Banner of the Championships

== Bidding and selection of Richmond ==
By UCI's deadline expired on February 20, 2011, three nations had announced their intention to bid for this event:

- Richmond, Virginia, United States
  - Richmond announced its bid to host these championships at an official press conference on December 21, 2010.
- Oman
  - During the 2011 Tour of Oman race organiser Eddy Merckx confirmed that the Arabian country would bid to host the 2015 world championships. He offered his support, and media reports indicated he could have a key role in the organisation of the championships.
- Quebec City, Quebec, Canada
  - Quebec City bid for these championships after being encouraged by Pat McQuaid, president of the UCI. Quebec City was the only Canadian city that entered a bid by Cycling Canada's deadline of November 7, 2010. In 2011 Quebec City withdrew, citing the high cost of hosting the event ($20 million).

On September 21, 2011, Richmond was selected as the host for the championships.

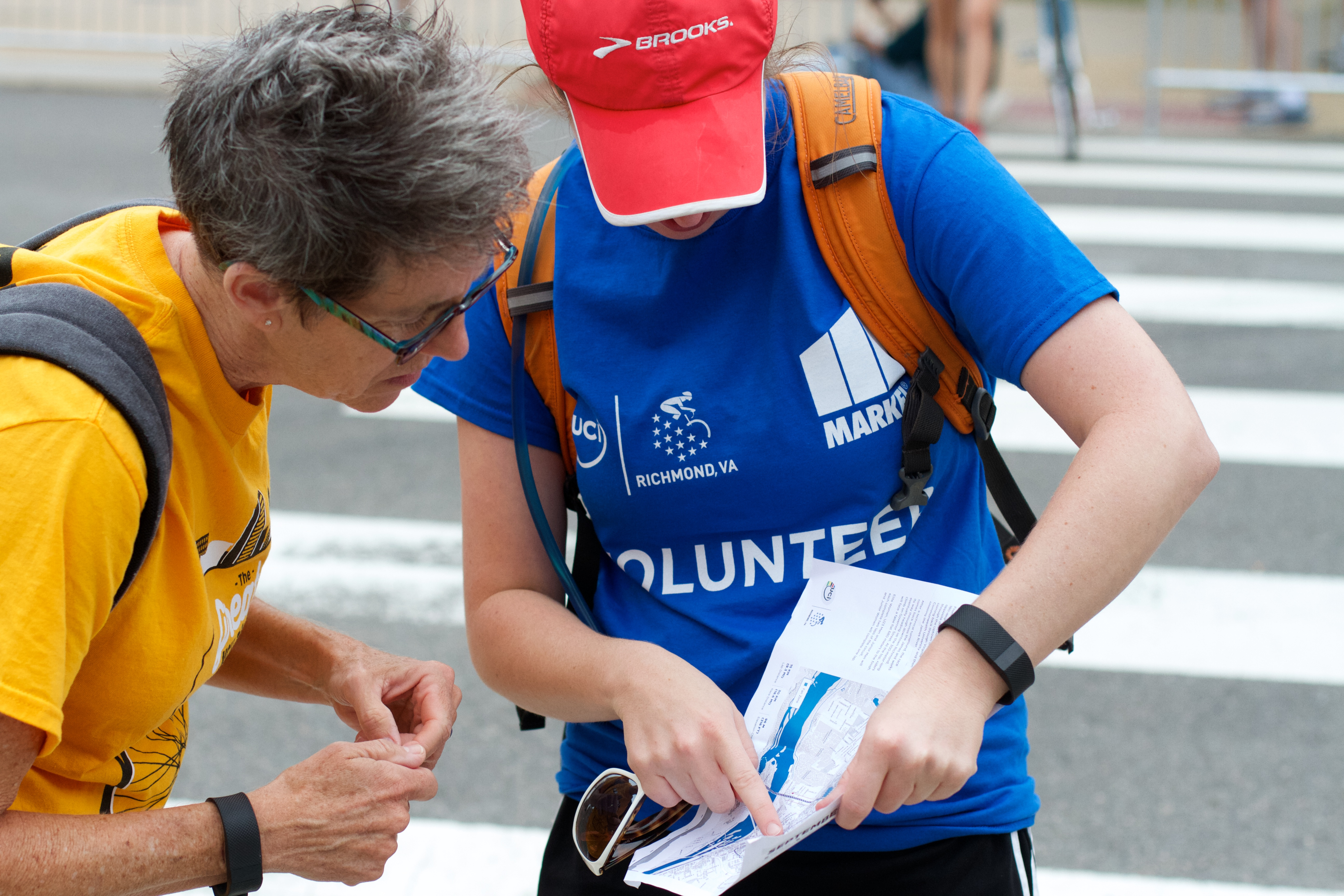
Volunteer helping during the event

Planners anticipated over 500,000 visitors over the 10-day event According to the organizers the championships are believed to generate a significant economic impact in the Greater Richmond region. Staging the event can generate a $21.3 million cumulative economic impact in the region from 2012 to 2015. Visitor spending can bring a $129.2 million economic impact to the region in 2015. The Richmond 2015 visitor spending is estimated to result in $3.8 million in tax revenue for local governments in the Greater Richmond region in 2015. For Virginia, the economic impact of Richmond 2015 is estimated to be $158.1 million, from both event staging and visitor spending. Richmond 2015 is estimated to also generate $5.0 million in state tax revenue.

== Qualification ==
Main qualification was based on performances on the UCI events during 2015. Results from January to the middle of August counted towards the qualification criteria, with the rankings being determined upon the release of the numerous tour rankings on August 15, 2015.

=== Olympic Qualification ===
The men's time trial and women's time trial were part of the qualification system for these cycling disciplines at the 2016 Summer Olympics.

== Participating nations ==
791 national representatives from 76 national federations and 40 trade teams (including other riders) registered for the championships. The two riders from the Dominican Republic who would compete in the men's time trial did not start. Also riders from Syria and Uganda registered for the championships but did not start. The number of cyclists per nation that competed, excluding riders in the team time trials, is shown in parentheses.

Participating national federations
Click on a nation to go to the nations' UCI Road World Championships page
- Algeria (7)
- Andorra (1)
- Argentina (5)
- Australia (29)
- Austria (16)
- Azerbaijan (4)
- Belgium (34)
- Bermuda (1)
- Bosnia and Herzegovina (1)
- Belarus (5)
- Brazil (8)
- Bulgaria (1)
- Canada (25)
- Chile (4)
- Colombia (23)
- Costa Rica (6)
- Croatia (3)
- Cyprus (1)
- Czech Republic (18)
- Denmark (20)
- Ecuador (12)
- Eritrea (5)
- El Salvador (3)
- Estonia (10)
- Finland (4)
- France (33)
- Great Britain (26)
- Germany (34)
- Greece (3)
- Guatemala (3)
- Guam (1)
- Hungary (2)
- Ireland (13)
- Israel (7)
- Italy (38)
- Japan (15)
- Kazakhstan (15)
- South Korea (3)
- Latvia (5)
- Lebanon (1)
- Lithuania (6)
- Luxembourg (11)
- Morocco (3)
- Moldova (2)
- Mexico (7)
- Mongolia (5)
- North Macedonia (2)
- Netherlands (32)
- Norway (24)
- New Zealand (15)
- Philippines (3)
- Poland (26)
- Portugal (12)
- Puerto Rico (4)
- Qatar (1)
- Romania (1)
- South Africa (14)
- Russia (29)
- Rwanda (4)
- Singapore (1)
- Saint Kitts and Nevis (1)
- Slovenia (15)
- Slovakia (10)
- Serbia (3)
- Spain (24)
- Sweden (18 or 16?)
- Switzerland (22)
- Thailand (4)
- Ukraine (12)
- United States (30) (host)
- Uzbekistan (2)
- Venezuela (1)
- Zimbabwe (2)

== Schedule ==
All events start and finish in Richmond, Virginia. All times are in Eastern Daylight Time (UTC−4).

Date	Timings		Event	Distance	
Team time trial events
September 20	11:30	12:55	Women's teams	38.6 km (24.0 mi)	
September 20	13:30	15:35	Men's teams	38.6 km (24.0 mi)	
Individual time trial events
September 21	10:00	11:10	Junior women	15 km (9.3 mi)	
September 21	11:30	15:50	Under-23 men	30 km (19 mi)	
September 22	09:30	13:05	Junior men	30 km (19 mi)	
September 22	13:30	16:45	Elite women	30 km (19 mi)	
September 23	13:00	15:30	Elite men	53.0 km (32.9 mi)	
Road race events					Laps
September 25	10:00	11:50	Junior women	64.9 km (40.3 mi)	4
September 25	12:45	16:50	Under-23 men	162.2 km (100.8 mi)	10
September 26	09:00	12:15	Junior men	129.6 km (80.5 mi)	8
September 26	13:00	16:25	Elite women	129.6 km (80.5 mi)	8
September 27	09:00	15:40	Elite men	259.2 km (161.1 mi)	16

== Courses ==
The process for designing the courses began in the summer of 2011. Three main factors were considered when designing the courses: competitive and technical aspects; showcasing the best of the Richmond region; and the overall impact on local residents and businesses. An UCI official inspected the courses in December 2013. The courses were officially announced in February 2014. The course was used in competition during the national collegiate championships over May 2–4, 2014. All the races will finish in downtown Richmond on Broad Street, where the last few hundred meters are relatively flat. The lead-up in the final kilometers will be a bit uphill. Each lap of the 10-mile road circuit will contain a number of short, challenging climbs. Each lap of the circuit contains about 400 ft (120 m) of climbing and includes cobbles.

=== Team time trial ===
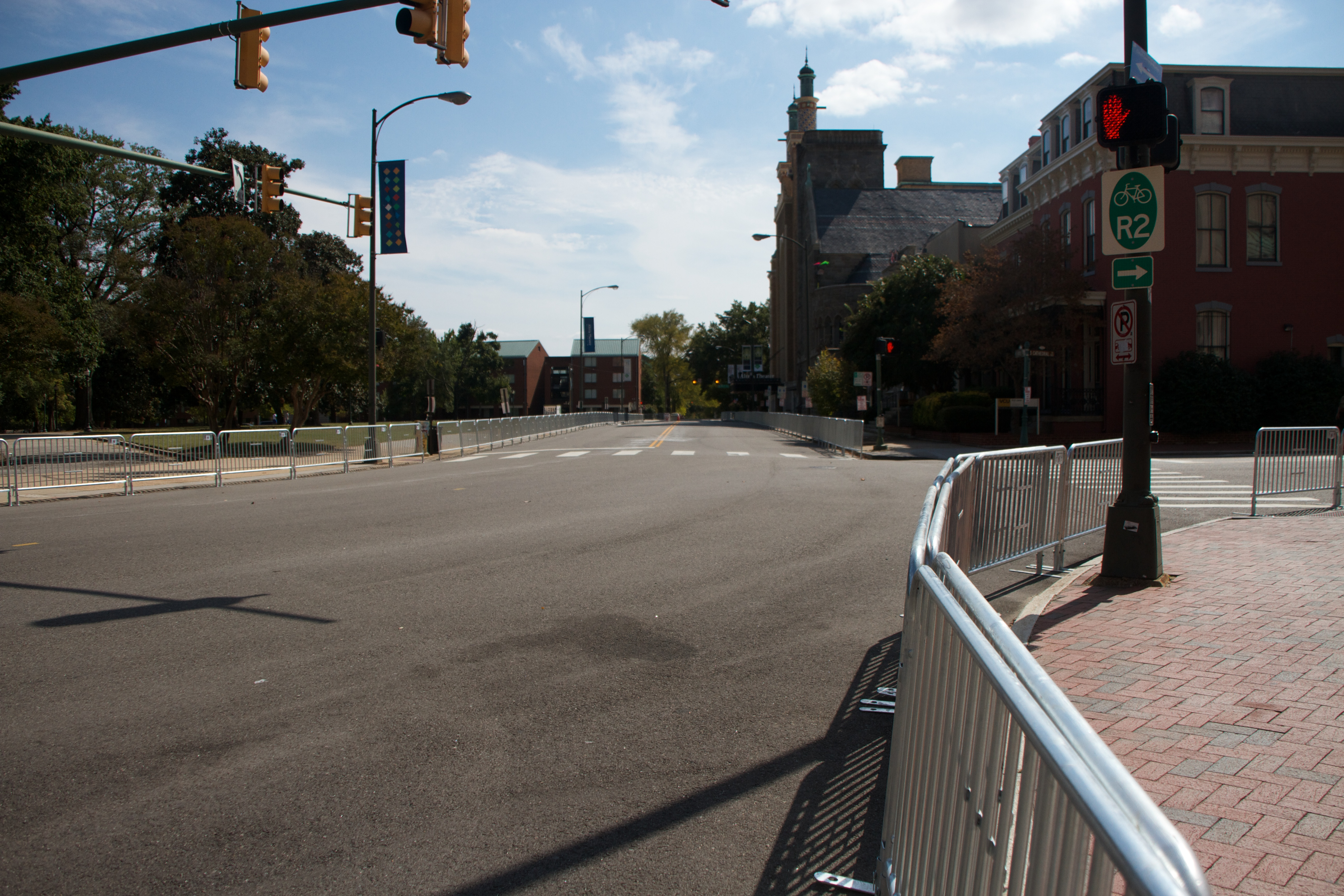
Part of the team time trial course

The course for the team time trial is 38.8 km (24.1 mi), and has a total elevation of 240 meters (790 feet). The team time trial starts in Henrico County at Lewis Ginter Botanical Garden, originally the Lakeside Wheel Club, founded in 1895 as a gathering spot for turn-of-the-century cyclists. The first kilometers go through Richmond's historic Northside neighborhoods leading into downtown. The course continues east of Richmond down rural Route 5, which parallels the 50-mile Virginia Capital Trail. The first few kilometers are scenic, flat, open roads that eventually narrow and wind through Richmond National Battlefield Park, a historic Civil War site. The race re-enters the city through Shockoe Bottom, eventually making a hard right turn on Governor Street to ascend 300 meters (980 feet). At the top, the teams have to take a sharp left turn onto the false-flat finishing straight, 680 meters (2,230 feet) to the finish.

=== Time trial (elite men) ===
The length of the course is 53 km (33 mi) and has a total elevation of 244 meters (801 feet). The course begins 20 mi (32 km) north of Richmond at Kings Dominion, Virginia's premier amusement park in Hanover County. It will go to Meadow Event Park, home to the State Fair of Virginia and birthplace of thoroughbred racing legend Secretariat. Racers will head south on long, open straights past the Hanover County Courthouse, the third oldest courthouse still in use in the U.S. and dating back to about 1740. Long hills on Brook and Wilkinson roads bring the racers back into the city through Virginia Union University before turning into downtown. Nearly half the turns of the entire route fall within the closing kilometers, the second to last of which is to ascend 300 meters (980 feet) on Governor Street. At the top, the teams have to take a sharp left turn onto the false-flat finishing straight, 680 meters (2,230 feet) to the finish.

=== Time trial (elite women, under-23 and juniors) ===
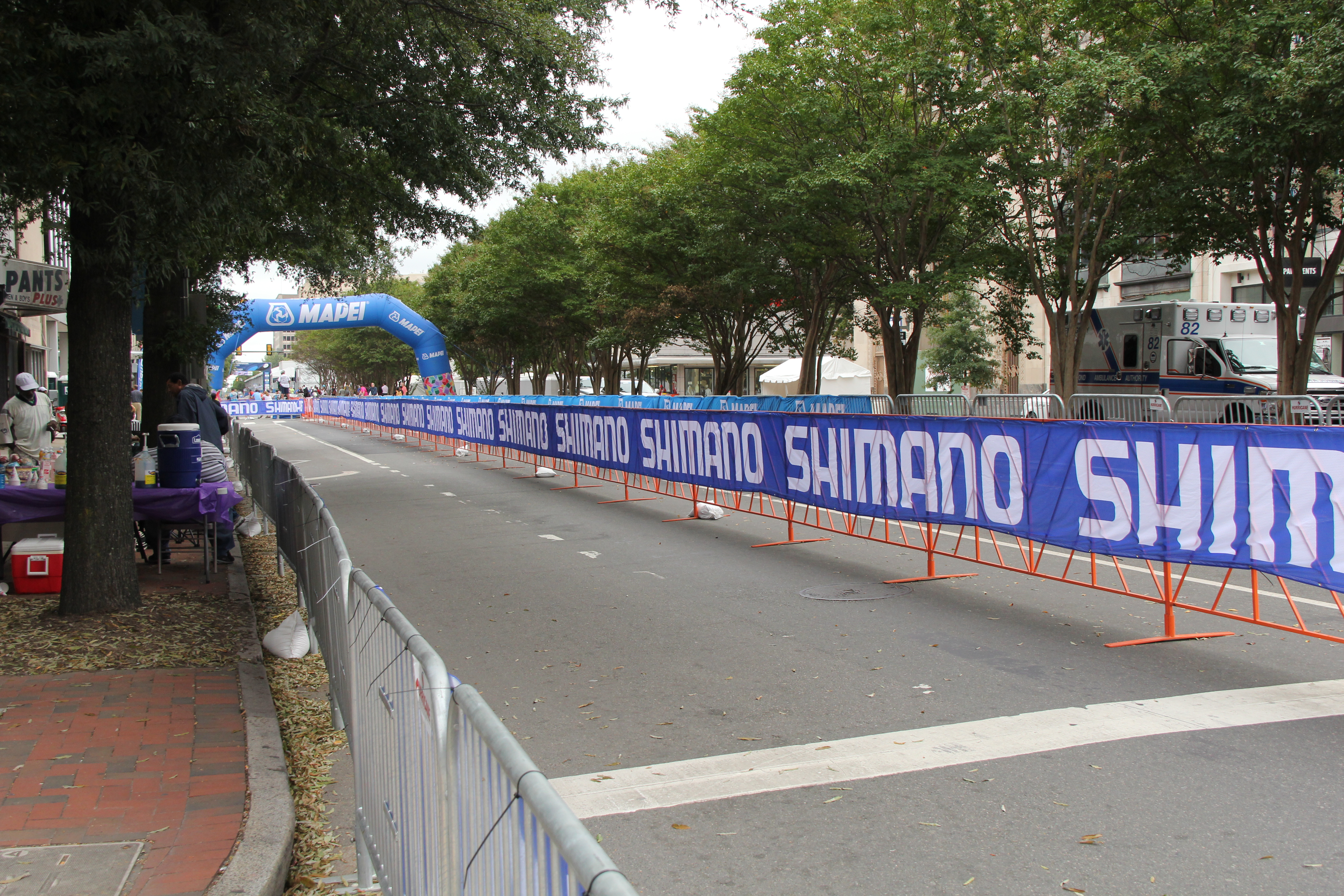
Part of the time trial course

All individual time trials apart from the elite men time trial are on a circuit. Elite women, under-23 and junior men will ride two laps of the circuit and junior women will complete one lap. The length of 1 lap is 15 km (9.3 mi) and has a total elevation of 96 meters (315 feet).

The circuit is a technical course that winds through the city of Richmond. The start will head west from downtown to Monument Avenue, a paver-lined, historic boulevard that's been named one of the "10 Great Streets in America." From there, the course makes a 180-degree turn at N. Davis Avenue and continues in the opposite direction. The race then cuts through the Uptown district before coming back through Virginia Commonwealth University and then crossing the James River. After a technical turnaround, the race comes back across the James and works its way through downtown Richmond, eventually heading up to ascend 300 meters (980 feet) on Governor Street. At the top, the teams have to take a sharp left turn onto the false-flat finishing straight, 680 meters (2,230 feet) to the finish.

=== Road race circuit ===
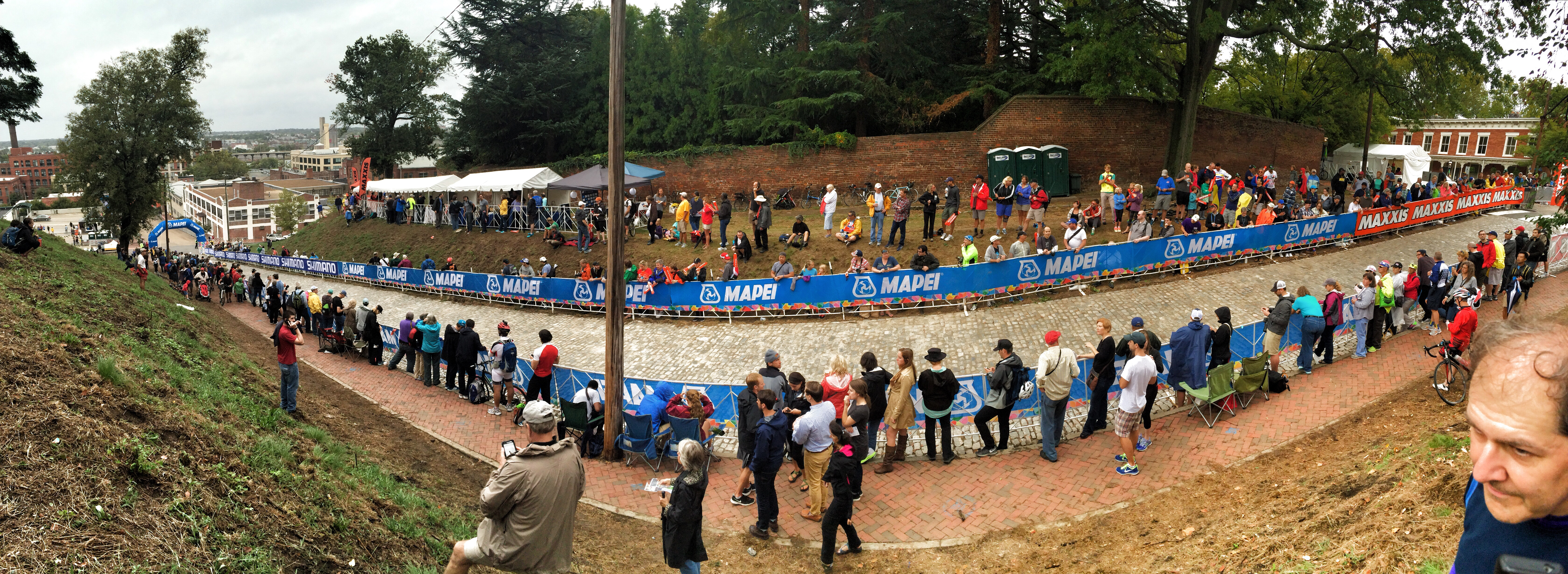
One of the two cobbled climbs in the road race circuit

Profile of the road race circuit

The length of the circuit is 16.2 km (10.1 mi) and has a total elevation of 103 meters (338 feet). All road races took place on a challenging, technical and inner-city road circuit. The circuit heads west from Downtown Richmond, working their way onto Monument Avenue, a paver-lined, historic boulevard that's been named one of the "10 Great Streets in America". Cyclists will take a 180-degree turn at the Jefferson Davis monument and then maneuver through the Uptown district and Virginia Commonwealth University. Halfway through the circuit, the race heads down into Shockoe Bottom before following the canal and passing Great Shiplock Park, the start of the Virginia Capital Trail. A sharp, off-camber turn at Rocketts Landing brings the riders to the narrow, twisty, cobbled 200-meter (660-foot) climb up to Libby Hill Park in the historic Church Hill neighborhood. A quick descent, followed by three hard turns leads to a 100-meter (330-foot) climb up 23rd Street. Once atop this steep cobbled hill, riders descend into Shockoe Bottom. This leads them to the final 300-meter (980-foot) climb on Governor Street. At the top, the teams have to take a sharp left turn onto the false-flat finishing straight, 680 meters (2,230 feet) to the finish.

== Events summary ==
=== Elite events ===
Event	Gold		Silver		Bronze	
Men's events
Men's road race	(Slovakia) Peter Sagan (SVK)	6h 14' 37"	(Australia) Michael Matthews (AUS)	+ 3"	(Lithuania) Ramūnas Navardauskas (LTU)	+ 3"
Men's time trial	(Belarus) Vasil Kiryienka (BLR)	1h 02' 29.45"	(Italy) Adriano Malori (ITA)	+ 9.08"	(France) Jérôme Coppel (FRA)	+ 26.62"
Men's team time trial	(United States) BMC Racing Team	42' 07.97"	(Belgium) Etixx–Quick-Step	+ 11.35"	(Spain) Movistar Team	+ 30.11"
Men's team time trial	Rohan Dennis (AUS); Silvan Dillier (SUI); Stefan Küng (SUI); Daniel Oss (ITA); Taylor Phinney (USA); Manuel Quinziato (ITA)	42' 07.97"	Tom Boonen (BEL); Michał Kwiatkowski (POL); Yves Lampaert (BEL); Tony Martin (GER); Niki Terpstra (NED); Rigoberto Urán (COL)	+ 11.35"	Andrey Amador (CRC); Jonathan Castroviejo (ESP); Alex Dowsett (GBR); Ion Izagirre (ESP); Adriano Malori (ITA); Jasha Sütterlin (GER)	+ 30.11"
Women's events
Women's road race	(United Kingdom) Lizzie Armitstead (GBR)	3h 23' 56"	(Netherlands) Anna van der Breggen (NED)	s.t.	(United States) Megan Guarnier (USA)	s.t.
Women's time trial	(New Zealand) Linda Villumsen (NZL)	40' 29.87"	(Netherlands) Anna van der Breggen (NED)	+ 2.54"	(Germany) Lisa Brennauer (GER)	+ 5.26"
Women's team time trial	(Germany) Velocio–SRAM	47' 35.72"	(Netherlands) Boels–Dolmans	+ 6.66"	(Netherlands) Rabobank-Liv Woman Cycling Team	+ 56.12"
Women's team time trial	Alena Amialiusik (BLR); Lisa Brennauer (DEU); Karol-Ann Canuel (CAN); Barbara Guarischi (ITA); Mieke Kröger (DEU); Trixi Worrack (DEU)	47' 35.72"	Lizzie Armitstead (GBR); Chantal Blaak (NED); Christine Majerus (LUX); Katarzyna Pawłowska (POL); Evelyn Stevens (USA); Ellen van Dijk (NED)	+ 6.66"	Lucinda Brand (NED); Thalita de Jong (NED); Shara Gillow (AUS); Roxane Knetemann (NED); Katarzyna Niewiadoma (POL); Anna van der Breggen (NED)	+ 56.12"

=== Under-23 events ===
Event	Gold		Silver		Bronze	
Men's Under-23 Events
Men's under-23 road race	(France) Kévin Ledanois (FRA)	3h 54' 45"	(Italy) Simone Consonni (ITA)	s.t.	(France) Anthony Turgis (FRA)	+ 2"
Men's under-23 time trial	(Denmark) Mads Würtz Schmidt (DEN)	37' 10.96"	(Germany) Maximilian Schachmann (GER)	+ 12.20"	(Germany) Lennard Kämna (GER)	+ 21.02"

=== Junior events ===
Event	Gold		Silver		Bronze	
Men's Juniors Events
Men's junior road race	(Austria) Felix Gall (AUT)	3h 11' 09"	(France) Clément Bétouigt-Suire (FRA)	s.t.	(Denmark) Rasmus Pedersen (DEN)	+ 1"
Men's junior time trial	(Germany) Leo Appelt (GER)	37' 45.01"	(United States) Adrien Costa (USA)	+ 17.22"	(United States) Brandon McNulty (USA)	+ 59.74"
Women's Juniors Events
Women's junior road race	(United States) Chloé Dygert (USA)	1h 42' 16"	(United States) Emma White (USA)	+ 1' 23"	(Poland) Agnieszka Skalniak (POL)	+ 1' 28"
Women's junior time trial	(United States) Chloé Dygert (USA)	20' 18.47"	(United States) Emma White (USA)	+ 1' 05.53"	(Australia) Anna-Leeza Hull (AUS)	+ 1' 26.08"

== Medal table ==
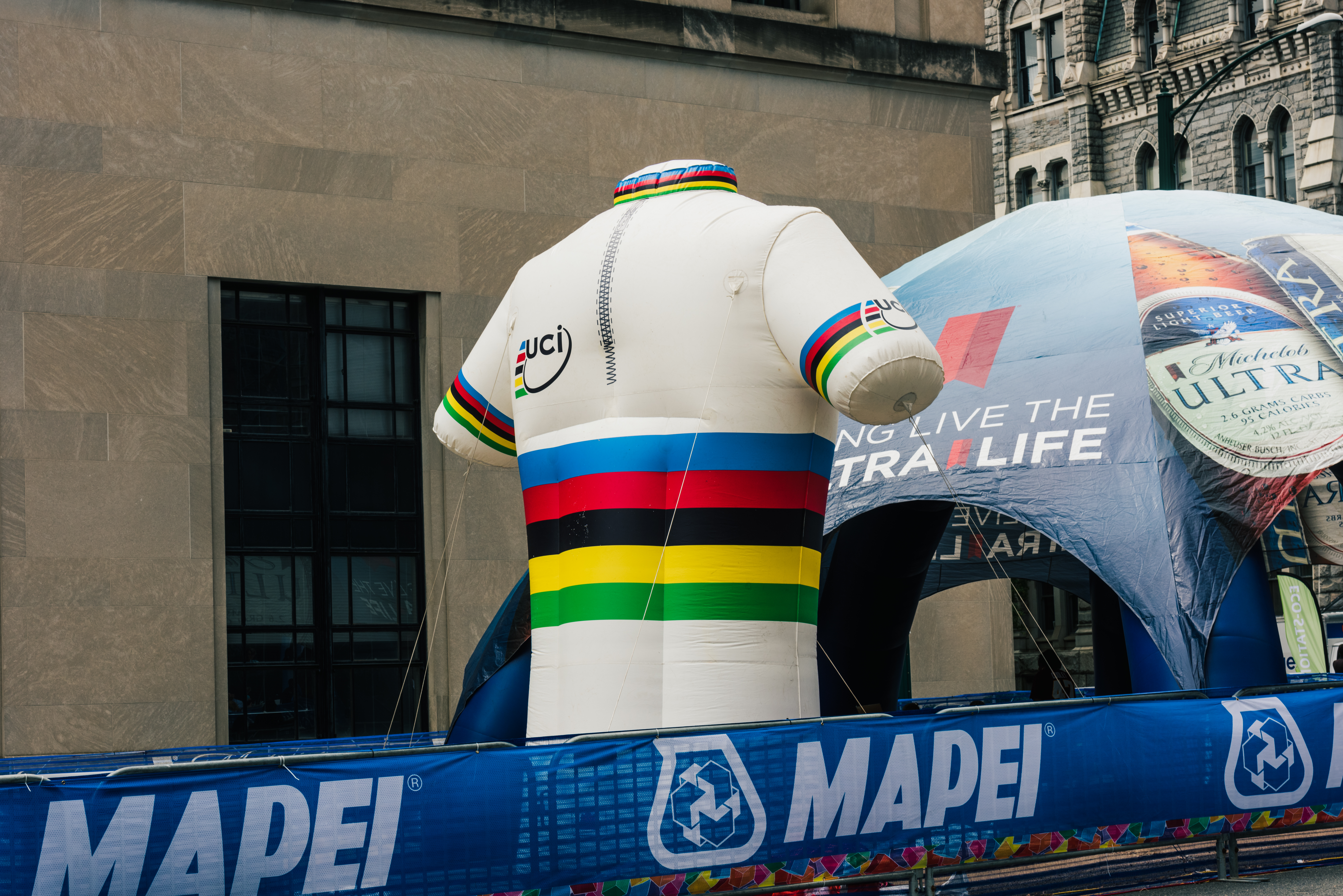
Inflatable rainbow jersey during the championships

Place	Nation	1st place, gold medalist(s)	2nd place, silver medalist(s)	3rd place, bronze medalist(s)	Total
1	United States	3	3	2	8
2	Germany	2	1	2	5
3	France	1	1	2	4
4	Denmark	1	0	1	2
5	Austria	1	0	0	1
5	Belarus	1	0	0	1
5	Great Britain	1	0	0	1
5	New Zealand	1	0	0	1
5	Slovakia	1	0	0	1
10	Netherlands	0	3	1	4
11	Italy	0	2	0	2
12	Australia	0	1	1	2
13	Belgium	0	1	0	1
14	Lithuania	0	0	1	1
14	Poland	0	0	1	1
14	Spain	0	0	1	1
Total		12	12	12	36

== Ranking by nations ==
For the ranking by nations the men's and women's team time trial are excluded.

Rank	Nation	Points
1	Netherlands	545
2	France	430
3	Australia	425
4	United States	424
5	Italy	349
6	Poland	241
7	Germany	230
8	Great Britain	227
9	Belarus	220
10	Slovakia	200
11	Norway	159
12	Spain	150
13	Switzerland	144
14	Canada	140
14	Lithuania	140
16	Sweden	130
17	New Zealand	125
18	Belgium	105
19	Portugal	100
20	Denmark	98
21	South Africa	43
22	Estonia	33
22	Russia	33
24	Czech Republic	32
24	Japan	31
26	Luxembourg	26
27	Austria	20
28	Argentina	10
29	Kazakhstan	8
30	Eritrea	7
31	Colombia	6
32	Latvia	5
32	Ukraine	5
