= Leo Appelt =

German cyclist

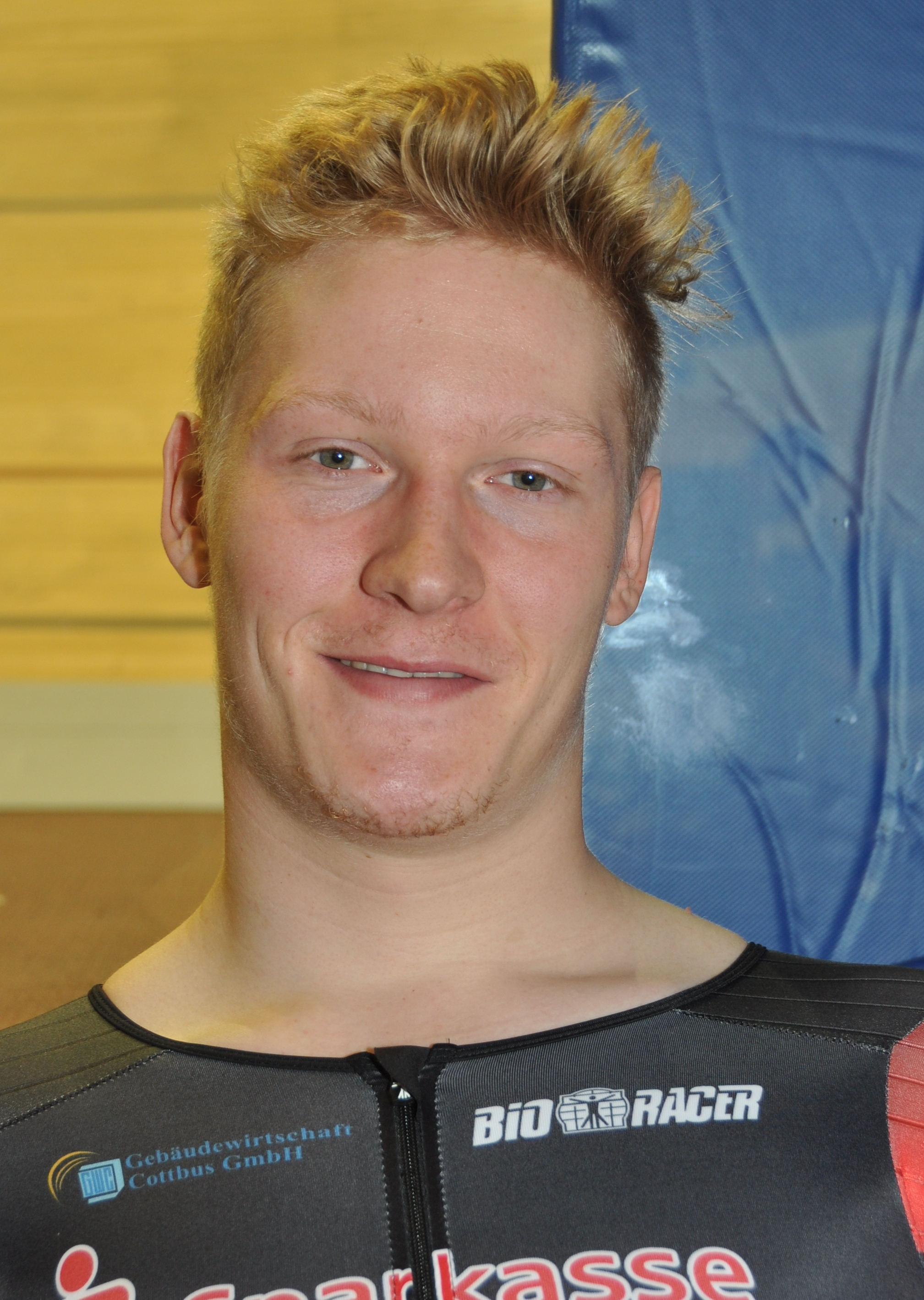
- Leo Appelt (2018)

Personal information
- Born: 26 May 1997 (age 29) Hanover, Germany

Cycling career
- Sport: Cycling
- Discipline: Road
- Role: Rider

Amateur teams
- 2015: RC Blau Gelb Langenhagen
- 2016–2017: BMC Development Team

Professional team
- 2018–2019: LKT Team Brandenburg
Medal record
Representing Germany
World Championships
Gold medal – first place	2015 Richmond	Junior Time Trial

Leo Appelt (born 26 May 1997 in Hanover) is a German former road cyclist. In 2015 Appelt won the junior world time trial championship.

== Major results ==
2014
4th Overall Sint–Martinusprijs Kontich

1st Prologue

2015
1st Time trial, UCI Junior Road World Championships
1st Individual pursuit, UCI Junior Track World Championships
1st Overall Internationale Niedersachsen–Rundfahrt Junioren

1st Stage 1

5th Grand Prix Rüebliland
