= Kazuya Narita =

Japanese track cyclist

Personal information
- Born: 25 February 1979 (age 47)

Cycling career
- Sport: Cycling
- Discipline: Track cycling
- Role: Rider
- Rider type: sprinter

Kazuya Narita (成田 和也, born 25 February 1979) is a Japanese male track cyclist, and part of the national team. He competed in the 2007 and 2009 UCI Track Cycling World Championships. He is also a professional keirin cyclist.
