= Okram Bikram Singh =

Indian track cyclist

Personal information
- Born: 3 February 1985 (age 41)

Cycling career
- Sport: Cycling
- Discipline: Track cycling
- Role: Rider
- Rider type: team sprint

Okram Bikram Singh (born 3 February 1985) is an Indian male track cyclist. He competed in the team sprint event at the 2012 and 2013 UCI Track Cycling World Championships.
