= Ahmed Al-Bardiny =

Qatari cyclist

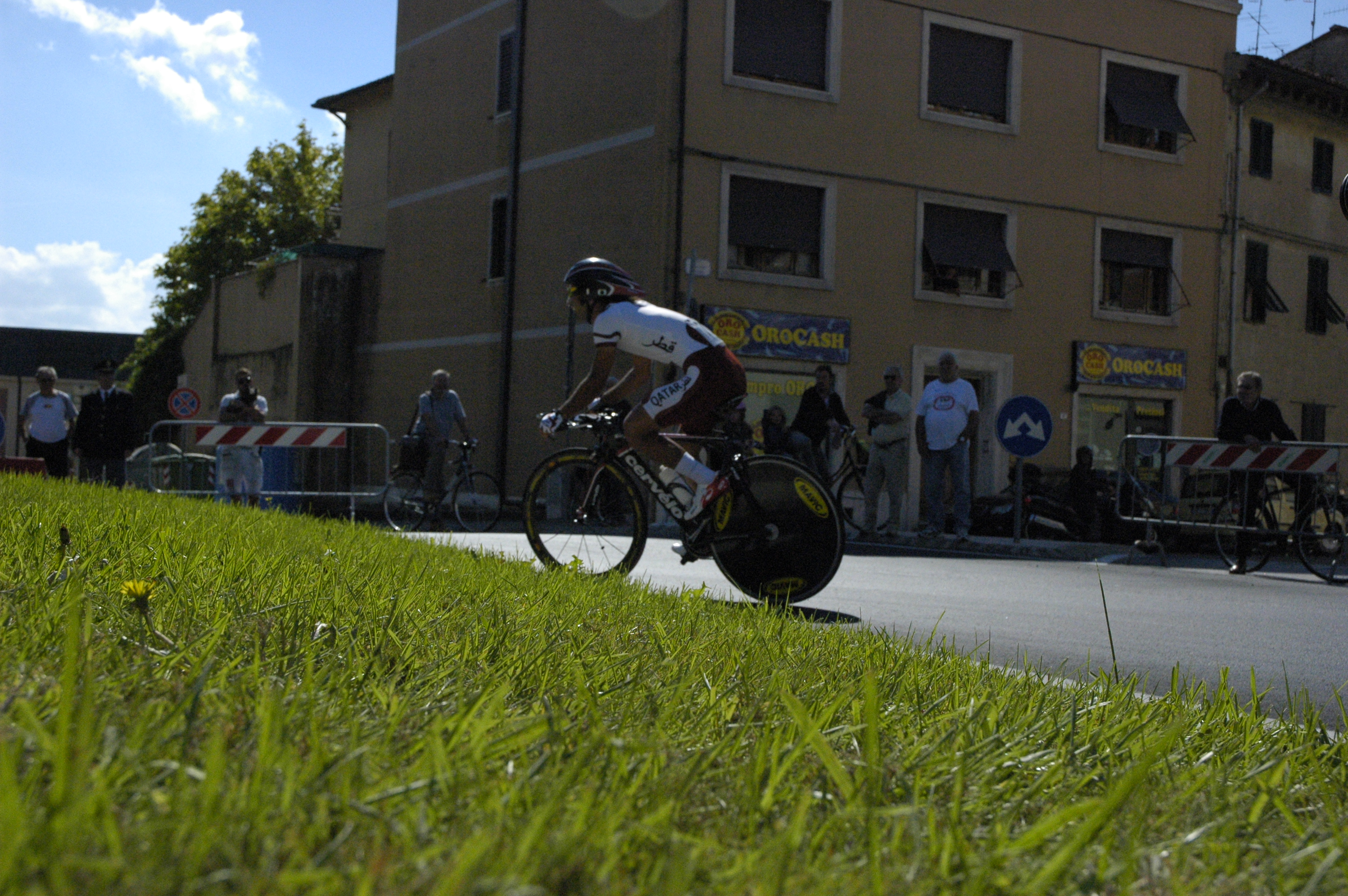

Personal information
- Born: April 4, 1990 (age 36) Qatar

Cycling career
- Sport: Cycling
- Discipline: Road
- Role: Rider

Amateur teams
- 2011: World Cycling Centre
- 2015: World Cycling Centre

Professional teams
- 2009: Doha Team
- 2016: Sharjah Team

Ahmed Al-Bardiny (born April 4, 1990) is a Qatari cyclist, who last rode for the Sharjah Team. He rode at the 2013 UCI World Time Trial Championships.

== Major results ==
2013
1st Stage 3 Sharjah Cycling Tour
2022
2nd Road race, National Road Championships
