= Julián Cardona =

Colombian cyclist

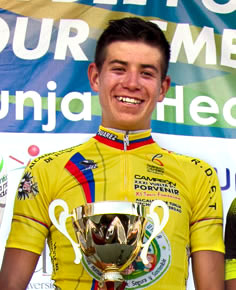
- Cardona in 2015.

Personal information
- Full name: Julián Cardona Tabares
- Nickname: Boti
- Born: 19 January 1997 (age 29) La Unión, Colombia

Cycling career
- Sport: Cycling
- Current team: Team Medellín–EPM
- Disciplines: Road; Track
- Role: Rider

Amateur teams
- 2016: Alcaldía de Ibagué
- 2020: Colnago CM
- 2022–2023: Team Sistecredito–GW

Professional teams
- 2017: Medellín–Inder
- 2018: EF Education First–Drapac p/b Cannondale
- 2019: Androni Giocattoli–Sidermec
- 2024–: Team Medellín–EPM
Medal record
Representing Colombia
Men's track cycling
World Junior Championships
Silver medal – second place	2014 Gwangmyeong	Team pursuit

Julián Cardona Tabares (born 19 January 1997) is a Colombian road racing cyclist, who currently rides for UCI Continental team Team Medellín–EPM.

== Major results ==
2015
Pan American Junior Road Championships

1st Time trial
3rd Road race

1st Time trial, National Junior Road Championships
2017
1st Time trial, National Under-23 Road Championships
5th Time trial, Pan American Under-23 Road Championships
2018
5th Time trial, National Road Championships
2022
3rd Overall Vuelta a Colombia
2023
2nd Overall Clásica de Fusagasugá
