= Feng Yong (cyclist) =

Chinese cyclist

Feng Yong (born 19 December 1985 in Henan), is a male Chinese Olympic racing cyclist, who competed for China at the 2008 Summer Olympics in the team sprint event.

== Sports career ==
- 2002 Nanyang Sports School;
- 2004 Henan Provincial Cycling Team;
- 2005 National Team

== Major performances ==
- 2005 National Games - 1st sprint/1 km individual time trial;
- 2006 Asian Games - 1st 1 km individual time trial/2nd team sprint;
- 2005/2006 World Cup Australia - 1st 1 km individual time trial;
- 2005/2006 World Championships - 6th 1 km individual time trial

== Records ==
- 2005/2006 World Cup Australia 1 km individual time trial - 1;03.016 (NR);
- 2006/2007 World Cup Russia 200m - 10.281 (NR)
