= 2025 in men's road cycling =

2025 in men's road cycling was about the 2025 men's bicycle races ruled by the UCI, national federations and the 2025 UCI Men's Teams.

== National events ==
=== Single day races (1.NE) ===
Race	Date	Cat. †	Winner	Second	Third	Ref
(Belize) KREM New Years' Day Cycling Classic	1 January 2025	1.NE	(Belize) Cory Williams; Miami Blazers	(Belize) Oscar Quiroz	(Colombia) Miguel Angel Cendales	
(France) Ouverture Saison de la Martinique	5 January 2025	1.NE	(France) Kyllian Boscher	(France) Mathis Risal	(France) Williams Petris	
(Australia) WA State Criterium Championships	5 January 2025	1.NE	(Australia) Sam Welsford; Red Bull–Bora–Hansgrohe	(Australia) Conor Leahy; CCACHE x BODYWRAP	(Australia) John Carter; CCACHE x BODYWRAP	
(Colombia) Circuito Ciclístico Jenesano	6 January 2025	1.NE	(Colombia) Jeferson Armando Ruiz; GW Erco SportFitness	Cristian Rico; Nu Colombia	(Colombia) Camilo Andres Gómez; GW Erco SportFitness	
(Colombia) Circuito Feria de Manizales	8 January 2025	1.NE	(Colombia) Brandon Rojas Vega; GW Erco SportFitness	(Colombia) Carlos Quintero	(Colombia) Nicolas David Gómez; GW Erco SportFitness	
(Australia) Australian National Criterium Championships	10 January 2025	1.NE	(Australia) Sam Welsford; Red Bull–Bora–Hansgrohe	(Australia) Cameron Scott; CCACHE x BODYWRAP	(Australia) Blake Quick; Roojai Insurance	
(Australia) Australian National Criterium Championships	10 January 2025	1.NEU	(Australia) John Carter; CCACHE x BODYWRAP	(Australia) Leo Zimmermann; Norwood Cycling Club	(Australia) Brayden Bloch	
(New Zealand) Lake Dunstan Cycle Challenge	11 January 2025	1.NE	(New Zealand) James Gardner; Whoosh–NZ Cycling Project	(New Zealand) Eli Tregidga; Central Otago Wakatipu CC	(New Zealand) James Wilson; Whoosh–NZ Cycling Project	
(Uruguay) Fiesta Del Pueblo - Treinta y Tres	11 January 2025	1.NE	(Uruguay) Leonel Rodríguez	(Uruguay) Diego Jamen	(Uruguay) Ignacio Maldonado	
(Mali) Course de vélo de Kola	12 January 2025	1.NE	(Mali) Oumar Togola	(Mali) Konimba Doumbia	(Mali) Namakoro Togola	
(Namibia) Nedbank Windhoek Pedal Power I	12 January 2025	1.NE	(Namibia) Alex Miller; SWATT - King Price	(Namibia) Drikus Coetzee; Hollard Elite	(Namibia) Justus Beulker; Team MBM	
(Australia) Villawood Men's Classic	18 January 2025	1.NE	(Australia) Sam Welsford; Red Bull–Bora–Hansgrohe	(Germany) Henri Uhlig; Alpecin–Deceuninck	(United Kingdom) Matthew Brennan; Visma–Lease a Bike	
(Benin) Porto Novo Criterium	18 January 2025	1.NE	Ricardo Sodjede (BEN)	(Benin) Corneil Kokou Attai		
(Colombia) Circuito Ciudad de Tuta	18 January 2025	1.NE	Wilmar Paredes (COL); Team Medellín–EPM	(Colombia) Diego Camargo	Jonathan Guatibonza; Nu Colombia U23	
(Mali) Grand Prix Aguib Berthé	18 January 2025	1.NE	Yaya Diallo (MLI)	(Mali) Issa Kone	(Mali) Amadou Koné	
New Zealand Criterium National Championships	18 January 2025	1.NE	Keegan Hornblow (NZL); Whoosh–NZ Cycling Project	(New Zealand) Tom Sexton; St George Continental Cycling Team	(New Zealand) Ben Oliver; Whoosh–NZ Cycling Project	
New Zealand Criterium National Championships U23	18 January 2025	1.NEU	James Gardner (NZL); Whoosh–NZ Cycling Project	(New Zealand) Reef Roberts; Groupama–FDJ United Continental Team	(New Zealand) Marshall Erwood; Whoosh–NZ Cycling Project	
(South Africa) Mpumalanga Road Champs	18 January 2025	1.NE	Joshua Lubbe (RSA)	(South Africa) Nico Bell	(Netherlands) Anton Wiersma	
(Argentina) Clásica Doble Difunta Correa	19 January 2025	1.NE	Leonardo Cobarrubia (ARG)	(Argentina) Nicolás Tivani; Aviludo–Louletano–Loulé	(Argentina) Ángel Oropel	
(Argentina) Mendoza-San Juan	19 January 2025	1.NE				
(Namibia) Nedbank WPP II	19 January 2025	1.NE	Roger Surén (NAM); Team MBM	(Namibia) Christiaan Janse Van Rensburg; CYMOT Racing Team	(Namibia) Kevin Lowe; CYMOT Racing Team	
(Puerto Rico) Clasico de Ciclismo Sangermeño Portacoeli	19 January 2025	1.NE	Edgardo Richiez (PUR)	(Puerto Rico) Dixon Vargas	(Puerto Rico) Dennis González	
(South Africa) Gauteng Cycling Champs	19 January 2025	1.NE	Pedri Crause (RSA)	(South Africa) Blaine Kieck; CC Villeneuve Saint Germain	(South Africa) Callum Ormiston; The Hurricane & Thunder Cycling Team	
(Turkey) Turkish Cycling Cup I ITT	19 January 2025	1.NE	Ali Egin (TUR); Konya Büyükşehir Belediyespor	(Turkey) Ahmet Örken; Spor Toto	(Turkey) Ramazan Yılmaz; Konya Büyükşehir Belediyespor	
(United Arab Emirates) Al Salam Championship	19 January 2025	1.NE	Matevž Govekar (SVN); Team Bahrain Victorious	(Belgium) Tim Wellens; UAE Team Emirates XRG	(United Arab Emirates) Abdulla Jasim Al-Ali; UAE Team Emirates Gen Z	
(United States) CBR Racing Series	19 January 2025	1.NE	Alejandro Che (USA); Kelly Benefits Cycling Team	(United States) Jason Paez; L39ION of Los Angeles	(United States) Luke Fetzer	
(Turkey) Turkish Cycling Cup I RR	21 January 2025	1.NE	Ahmet Akpinar (TUR); Konya Büyükşehir Belediyespor	(Turkey) Muhammed Erkan; Konya Büyükşehir Belediyespor	(Turkey) Mustafa Tarakçı; Konya Büyükşehir Belediyespor	
(Australia) NCC TDU Criteriums	23 January 2025	1.NE	Blake Agnoletto (AUS); Atom 6 Bikes-Decca Continental Team	(Australia) Tristan Saunders; Team Brennan p/b TP32	(Australia) Nate Hadden; Bendigo & District CC	
(Mali) Grand Prix de Finkolo Ganadougou	25 January 2025	1.NE				
(Costa Rica) Copa Roes I	26 January 2025	1.NE	Jason Huertas (CRC)	Pablo Mudarra (CRC)	(Costa Rica) José Pablo Sancho	
(Namibia) Nedbank WPP III	26 January 2025	1.NE	Drikus Coetzee (NAM); Hollard Elite	Roger Surén (NAM); Team MBM	(Namibia) Marco Thiel; Cymot Racing Team	
(South Africa) Rhodes Quality Winelands Cycle Race	26 January 2025	1.NE	Sascha Weber (GER)	(South Africa) Tiano Da Silva	(South Africa) Wessel Botha	
(Spain) Subida Ciclista Canillas de Aceituno	26 January 2025	1.NE	Eduardo Gómez Díez (ESP); Brócoli Mecánico Sakata Lorca	(Spain) Félix Aranda	(Spain) Manuel Garrido Aguilar	
(Uruguay) Vuelta al Pueblo	26 January 2025	1.NE	Sergio Fredes (ARG)	(Uruguay) Sebastián Rodríguez	(Uruguay) Juan Caorsi	
(France) Essor Basque I	1 February 2025	1.NE	Gari Lagnet (FRA); AC Bisontine	(France) Nathan Vandepitte	(France) Mathieu Dupé; Mayenne-V and B-Monbana	
(Mali) Grand Prix Cycliste de WETO	1 February 2025	1.NE	Tiemoko Diamoutene (MLI)	(Mali) Fidèle Cissé	(Mali) Baba Kouma	
(South Africa) Rooiwal Challenge	1 February 2025	1.NE	Ivan Haasbroek (RSA)	(South Africa) Paul Newman	(South Africa) Christiaan Klopper	
(Spain) Gran Premio Ciclista Ciudad de Fuenlabrada	1 February 2025	1.NE	Daniel Fernández (ESP); Farmaquisir - Café Barante	(Norway) Jonas Hjorth	(Spain) Nicolas Galindo; El Bicho - Prime Numbers	
(United Arab Emirates) Al Ain Cycle Classic	1 February 2025	1.NE	Francesco Bettini (ITA)	(United Kingdom) George Channings	(Italy) Giovanni Lazzarini	
(United States) Swamp Classic RR	1 February 2025	1.NE	ABUS Racing	(United States) Derek Schanze	(United States) Owen Shott	
(United States) Swamp Classic ITT	1 February 2025	1.NE	Joaquin Medina Garzon (USA)	(United States) Jack Diemar; Kelly Benefits Cycling Team	(Canada) Ed Veal; AUTOMATIC | ABUS Racing	
(France) Circuit de l'Essor	2 February 2025	1.NE	Titouan Margueritat (FRA); Team Atria - Montluçon Cyclisme	(France) Artus Jaladeau; GSC Blagnac Vélo Sport 31	(France) Gari Lagnet; AC Bisontine	
(France) Challenge du CRCM I	2 February 2025	1.NE	Gaëtan Fetaud (FRA)	(France) Jordan Labejof	(France) Mickaël Stanislas	
(Guatemala) Presentacion de Equipos	2 February 2025	1.NE	Henry Sam (GUA)	(Guatemala) Dorian Monterroso	(Guatemala) Melvin Torres	
(Spain) Trofeo Ciudad de Badajoz	2 February 2025	1.NE	Pablo Lospitao (ESP); Caja Rural-Alea	(Portugal) João Letras	(Spain) Fabio Gerardo	
(Turkey) International Alanya Castle Criterium	2 February 2025	1.NE	Ramazan Yılmaz (TUR); Konya Büyükşehir Belediyespor	(Malaysia) Harrif Saleh; Terengganu Cycling Team	(Turkey) Ahmet Örken; Spor Toto	
(United States) Swamp Classic Criterium	2 February 2025	1.NE	Joaquin Medina Garzon (USA)	(United States) Luke Harris	(United States) Juan Galloza	
(United States) Major Motion's King and Queen of Crit	2 February 2025	1.NE	Noah Mandow (USA)	(Belize) Justin Williams; L39ION of Los Angeles	(United States) Chris Hildreth	
(France) Tour de Basse-Navarre	7 February 2025	1.NE	Mathis Guay (FRA); AVC Aix Provence Dole	(France) Corentin Dufort	(France) Cyril Couture	
(Australia) Melbourne to Warrnambool Classic	8 February 2025	1.NE	Blake Agnoletto (AUS); Atom 6 Bikes - Decca Continental Team	(Australia) Cameron Scott; CCACHE x BODYWRAP	(Australia) Hamish McKenzie; Team Jayco–AIS	
(Bahrain) Abdulhakim Al-Shammari Cycling Race	8 February 2025	1.NE	Aamir Hussain Fahim (IRI)	(United Arab Emirates) Ibrahim Al Suwaidi	(United Arab Emirates) Nasser Al Memari	
(France) Ronde du Pays Basque	8 February 2025	1.NE	Malo Stevant (FRA); Dinan Sport Cycling	(France) Stéfan Bennett	(France) Antoine Trémoulet; OCF Team Legend Wheels	
(Rwanda) Criterium de Kigali	8 February 2025	1.NE	Didier Munyaneza (RWA)	(Rwanda) Etienne Tuyizere; Java - Inovotec Pro Team	(Rwanda) Jean Claude Nzafashwanayo	
(South Africa) 99er Cycle Tour	8 February 2025	1.NE	Jean-Pierre Lloyd (FRA)	(South Africa) Jaco Venter	(South Africa) Alex Heward	
(Spain) Classica Ciudad del Sol	8 February 2025	1.NE	Ignacio Gallego (ESP)	(Spain) Alfonso Torres	(Spain) Alejandro Jimenez Diaz	
(United States) Central Park Spring Classic	8 February 2025	1.NE	William Hacker (GBR)	(Republic of Ireland) Cormac Daly	(United States) Matthew Lloyd-Thomas	
(Barbados) Don Stoute & Percival Niles Memorial Race	9 February 2025	1.NE	Russell Elcock (BAR)	(Barbados) Liam Hutchinson	(Barbados) Shakeil Walker	
(France) Trophée de l'Essor	9 February 2025	1.NE	Jack Brough (GBR); AVC Aix Provence Dole	(France) Mickaël Guichard; Team Atria - Montluçon Cyclisme	(France) Antoine Berger; SCO Dijon - Team Matériel - Velo.com	
(France) Grand Prix de Manduel	9 February 2025	1.NE	Markus Pajur (EST); Charvieu Chavagneux Isère Cyclisme	(France) Olivier Leroy	(France) Louka Ducruet; CR4C Roanne	
(France) Grand Prix de l'Ouverture CRCIG	9 February 2025	1.NE	Lucas Chanut (FRA); UC Pélussin	(France) Julien Chane-Foc	(France) Alexis Caresmel	
(United Kingdom) Portsdown Classic	9 February 2025	1.NE	Jordan Giles (GBR)	(United Kingdom) Thomas Springbett; Foran CCC	(United Kingdom) Edward Morgan; Muc-Off-SRCT-Storck	
(Portugal) Prova de Abertura	9 February 2025	1.NE	Santiago Mesa (COL); Efapel Cycling	(Argentina) Tomás Contte; Aviludo–Louletano–Loulé	(Venezuela) Leangel Linarez; Tavfer–Ovos Matinados–Mortágua	
(Spain) Un invierno en Mallorca II	9 February 2025	1.NE	rad-net	(Spain) Roberto Ledesma Estévez	(Spain) Jordi Artigues; Club Ciclista Padronés - Cortizo	
(Turkey) International Kleopatra Beach Criterium	9 February 2025	1.NE	Ramazan Yılmaz (TUR); Konya Büyükşehir Belediyespor	(Turkey) Kaan Özkalbim; Spor Toto	(Turkey) Feritcan Şamlı; Spor Toto	
(United States) Roger Millikan Grand Prix	9 February 2025	1.NE	Cory Lockwood (USA); Miami Blazers	(United States) Noah Mandow	(Belize) Cory Williams; Miami Blazers	
(France) Boucles du Haut-Var I	15 February 2025	1.NE	(France) Victor Loulergue; Bourg-en-Bresse Ain Cyclisme	(France) Nicolas Silliau; Bourg-en-Bresse Ain Cyclisme	(France) Lucas Grieco; AVC Aix Provence Dole	
(Botswana) Tsela Riders Club Race Q1	16 February 2025	1.NE	Rebaone Khunofu (BOT)	(Botswana) Jackson Ruwona	(Botswana) Boikhutso Matebu	
(Brazil) GP Cavalo de Aço	16 February 2025	1.NE	Renan Vieira (BRA)	(Brazil) Gabriel Metzger	(Brazil) Matheus Iniesta Cabrini	
(Burkina Faso) Grand Prix de la RTB	16 February 2025	1.NE	Soumaila Ilboudo (BUR)	(Burkina Faso) Boureima Nana	(Burkina Faso) Mounkaïle Raweindé	
(France) Trophée Cug'Anim	16 February 2025	1.NE	Joris Lepoittevin-Dubost (FRA); Moyon Percy VC	(France) Maxence Maignan	(France) Noah Delonglee; VC Avranches	
(France) Challenge CRCM III	16 February 2025	1.NE	Gabin Vedel (FRA)	(France) Marc Flavien	(France) Laurent Neror	
(France) Boucles du Haut-Var II	16 February 2025	1.NE	(France) Mathias Sanlaville; Team Atria - Montluçon Cyclisme	(France) Nicolas Silliau; Bourg-en-Bresse Ain Cyclisme	(United Kingdom) Alfred George; SCO Dijon - Team Matériel - Velo.com	
(Japan) Tokyo Criterium	16 February 2025	1.NE	Shoi Matsuda (JPN); Team Bridgestone Cycling	(Japan) Katsuya Okamoto; Team Bridgestone Cycling	(Japan) Kazushige Kuboki; Aisan Racing Team	
(South Africa) Dis-Chem Ride for Sight	16 February 2025	1.NE	Christiaan Klopper (RSA)	(South Africa) Reinardt Janse van Rensburg	(South Africa) Gustav Roller; CC Chevigny U19	
(South Africa) The Herald Cycle Tour	16 February 2025	1.NE	Hanro Geldenhuys (RSA)	(South Africa) Bradley Gouveris	(South Africa) Wynand Hofmeyr	
(Spain) Cursa Social de la Bisbal	16 February 2025	1.NE	Adrià Garmendia (ESP)	(Spain) Roger Pareta; Equipo Finisher - Kern Pharma	(Spain) Pau Matarín; Technosylva Maglia Bembibre	
(United States) Pine Flat Road Race	16 February 2025	1.NE	Quinn Felton (USA)	(United States) Mattheus Johnson	(United States) Bradley Wiggs	
(France) Boucles du Haut-Var III)	17 February 2025	1.NE	(France) Julien Marin; Hexagone - Corbas Lyon Métropole	(France) Louis Hardouin; Guidon Chalettois	(France) Victor Loulergue; Bourg-en-Bresse Ain Cyclisme	
(France) Boucles du Haut-Var IV)	18 February 2025	1.NE	(France) Mathias Sanlaville; Team Atria - Montluçon Cyclisme	(France) Théo Laurans; Vélo Club Villefranche Beaujolais	(France) Malo Stevant; Dinan Sport Cycling	
(France) Boucles du Haut-Var V)	19 February 2025	1.NE	(France) Enzo Boulet; Vélo Club Villefranche Beaujolais	(Estonia) Markus Pajur; Charvieu Chavagneux Isère Cyclisme	(France) Thibault Rollée; Team Marni-N'side	
(France) Grand Prix du Pays d'Aix	22 February 2025	1.NE	Antoine Berger (FRA); SCO Dijon - Team Matériel - Velo.com	(France) Léandre Huck; Véloce Club Rouen 76	(France) Julien Marin; Hexagone - Corbas Lyon Métropole	
(France) Grand Prix de Sainte-Luce	22 February 2025	1.NE	Fabien Erdual (FRA)	(France) Antoine Gauran	(France) Benjamin Bramoulle	
(Italy) Coppa San Geo	22 February 2025	1.NE	Matteo Ambrosini (ITA); MBH Bank Ballan CSB	(Italy) Cristian Remelli; General Store–Essegibi–Fratelli Curia	(Italy) Giovanni Bortoluzzi; General Store–Essegibi–Fratelli Curia	
(Italy) Firenze-Empoli	22 February 2025	1.NE	Ben Granger (GBR); MG.K Vis Costruzioni e Ambiente	(Italy) Cesare Chesini; MBH Bank Ballan CSB	(Italy) Diego Nembrini; General Store–Essegibi–Fratelli Curia	
(Japan) Kanoya Kimotsuki Road Race	22 February 2025	1.NE	José Vicente Toribio (ESP); Matrix Powertag	(France) Thomas Lebas; Kinan Racing Team	(Japan) Ikki Watanabe	
(Morocco) GP El Kelaa Des Seraghna	22 February 2025	1.NE	Mohcine El Kouraji (MAR)	(Morocco) Driss El Alouani; Agadir Vélo Propulsion	(Morocco) Kamal Mahroug; Agadir Vélo Propulsion	
(Spain) Zumaiako Saria	22 February 2025	1.NE	Diego Ruiz de Arcaute (ESP); Caja Rural-Alea	(Spain) Roger Pareta; Equipo Finisher - Kern Pharma	(Spain) Nikolas Aguirre Maier; Electro Alavesa-Zuia Ingenieri	
(Burkina Faso) Grand Prix 14	23 February 2025	1.NE	Nassirou Sorgho (BUR)	(Burkina Faso) Saturnin Yaméogo	(Burkina Faso) Daouda Soulama	
(Cyprus) G&P Lazarou Elmasco	23 February 2025	1.NE	Bogdan Zabelinskiy (CYP); Soudal–Quick-Step Devo Team	(Cyprus) Alexandros Agrotis; Matrix Powertag	(Cyprus) Christodoulos Achas; Bialini Team Global	
(France) Grand Prix de Puyloubier-Sainte-Victoire	23 February 2025	1.NE	Sacha Bergaud (FRA); SCO Dijon - Team Matériel - Velo.com	(France) Hugo Théot; Paris Cycliste Olympique	(United Kingdom) Huw Buck Jones; Bourg-en-Bresse Ain Cyclisme	
(France) Plaintel-Plaintel	23 February 2025	1.NE	Robin Lesné (FRA); Dinan Sport Cycling	(France) Gabriel Garçon; UCK Vannes - Bretagne Sud Cyclisme	(France) Quentin Plusquellec; Team Adris-La Crêpe de Brocéliande-BLC	
(France) La Théobald Mania Classique	23 February 2025	1.NE	Julien Chane-Foc (FRA)	(France) Yannis André Lubin	(France) Allan Peramin Noslen	
(France) Prix de Bezault	23 February 2025	1.NE	Axel Rambault (FRA); C'Chartres Cyclisme	(France) Corentin Tricot; Guidon Chalettois	(France) Alix Brissaire; Mayenne-V and B-Monbana	
(United Kingdom) Clayton Spring Classic	23 February 2025	1.NE	Simon Wilson (GBR)	(United Kingdom) Sam Walsham	(United Kingdom) Cai Curtis-Roberts	
Hong Kong Road Race III	23 February 2025	1.NE	Siu Kong Chung (HKG)	(Hong Kong) Chin Long Lee	(Hong Kong) Lionel Leong	
(Italy) Gran Premio Misano 100	23 February 2025	1.NE	Lorenzo Ursella (ITA); S.C. Padovani Polo Cherry Bank	(Italy) Lorenzo Cataldo; Gragnano Sporting Club	(Italy) Alessio Menghini; General Store–Essegibi–Fratelli Curia	
(Italy) Gran Premio La Torre	23 February 2025	1.NE	Riccardo Lorello (ITA); Hopplà–Petroli Firenze–Don Camillo	(Italy) Matteo Regnanti; Hopplà–Petroli Firenze–Don Camillo	(Italy) Stefano Leali	
(Japan) Meiji-Jingu Outer Garden University Criterium	23 February 2025	1.NE	George Matsui (JPN); Aisan Racing Team	(Japan) Kosuke Omori	(Japan) Gen Abe; VC Fukuoka	
(Japan) Shibushi Criterium	23 February 2025	1.NE	Tadaaki Nakai (JPN); Shimano Racing Team	(Japan) Yuki Ishihara; Shimano Racing Team	(Japan) Taisei Hino	
(Mali) Grand Prix du Club Cycliste de Kignan	23 February 2025	1.NE	Fidèle Cissé (MLI)	(Mali) Yaya Diallo	(Mali) Tiemoko Diamouténé	
(Morocco) GP El Kelaa Des Seraghna Criterium	23 February 2025	1.NE	Kamal Mahroug (MAR); Agadir Vélo Propulsion	(Morocco) Adil El Arbaoui	(Morocco) Mohcine El Kouraji	
(Morocco) GP Zenata	23 February 2025	1.NE	Zouhair Rahil (MAR); Sidi Ali–Unlock Sports Team	(Morocco) Mouhcine Echchaib	(Morocco) Youssef Farid	
(Mauritius) Critérium de Cascavelle	23 February 2025	1.NE	Jeremie L'Aiguille (MRI)	(Mauritius) Steward Pharmasse	(Mauritius) Laurent L'Entete	
(New Zealand) Crop Duster	23 February 2025	1.NE	Cameron Jones (NZL)	(New Zealand) Jeremy Presbury	(New Zealand) Paul Wright; Factor Racing	
(South Africa) Tour de PPA	23 February 2025	1.NE	Stefan de Bod (RSA); Terengganu Cycling Team	(Germany) Sascha Weber	(South Africa) Jaco Venter	
(Spain) Circuito Guadiana	23 February 2025	1.NE	José María Martín (ESP); Extremadura - Pebetero	(Spain) César Pérez; Equipo Finisher - Kern Pharma	(Argentina) Fabricio Crozzolo; Technosylva Maglia Bembibre	
(United Arab Emirates) Spinneys Dubai 92 Cycle Challenge	23 February 2025	1.NE	Francesco Lamon (ITA)	Maksim Orekhov	(Netherlands) Jasper Verkuijl	
(Spain) Trofeo Antonio Gómez del Moral	28 February 2025	1.NE	Víctor Fernández (ESP)	(Spain) Eduardo Gómez; Brócoli Mecánico - Sakata - Lorca	(Norway) Jonas Hjorth	
(Italy) Memorial Polese	1 March 2025	1.NE	Gabriele Bessega (ITA); Biesse–Carrera–Premac	(Italy) Tommaso Bambagioni; U.C. Trevigiani Energiapura Marchiol	(Italy) Luca Cretti; MBH Bank Ballan CSB	
(Australia) Glenvale Criterium Series	1.NE	2 March 2025				
(Spain) Trofeo Interclub Campo de Cartagena-Mar Menor VI	1.NE	2 March 2025				
(New Zealand) Spoken Cycles Summer Series XVII	1.NE	4 March 2025				
(United Arab Emirates) Falcon Daman Series Race 6	1.NE	4 March 2025				
(Australia) Glenvale Criterium Series	1.NE	9 March 2025				
(France) Vienne Classic	1.NE	9 March 2025				
(Italy) Gran Premio dell'Industria di Civitanova Marche	1.NE	9 March 2025				
(Spain) Trofeo Interclub Campo de Cartagena-Mar Menor VII	1.NE	9 March 2025				
(New Zealand) Spoken Cycles Summer Series XVIII	1.NE	11 March 2025				
(Australia) Glenvale Criterium Series	1.NE	16 March 2025				
(Italy) Gran Premio San Giuseppe	1.NE	16 March 2025				
(New Zealand) Spoken Cycles Summer Series XIX	1.NE	18 March 2025				
(Italy) Gran Premio Fiera della Possenta	1.NE	22 March 2025				
(Australia) Glenvale Criterium Series	1.NE	23 March 2025				
(France) Grand Prix de Cintegabelle	1.NE	23 March 2025				
(Australia) Glenvale Criterium Series	1.NE	30 March 2025				
(Italy) Gran Premio della Battaglia	1.NE	30 March 2025				
(Spain) Trofeo Interclub Campo de Cartagena-Mar Menor VIII	1.NE	30 March 2025				
(Italy) Milano–Busseto	1.NE	5 April 2025				
(Italy) Coppa Caduti di Reda	1.NE	6 April 2025				
(Spain) Trofeo Interclub Campo de Cartagena-Mar Menor IX	1.NE	6 April 2025				
(Italy) Coppa Caduti Nervianesi	1.NE	25 April 2025				
(Italy) Vicenza-Bionde	1.NE	27 April 2025				
(Italy) GP General Store	1.NE	1 May 2025				
(France) GP de la Sologne des Étangs	1.NE	3 May 2025				
(Italy) Memorial Daniele Tortoli	1.NE	4 May 2025				
(Italy) Medaglia d'Oro Frare De Nardi	1.NE	4 May 2025				
(Italy) Trofeo Matteotti	1.NE	10 May 2025				
(Italy) Gran Premio Città di Pontedera	1.NE	17 May 2025				
(France) CLM Champenois	1.NE	18 May 2025				
(Italy) Memorial Maurizio Bresci	1.NE	18 May 2025				
(Italy) Trofeo Città di San Giovanni Valdarno	1.NE	27 May 2025				
(Italy) La Medicea	1.NE	31 May 2025				
(Italy) Fiorano-Fiorano	1.NE	2 June 2025				
(Italy) Giro del Piave	1.NE	8 June 2025				
(Italy) Gran Premio Città di Empoli	1.NE	14 June 2025				
(Italy) Giro del Montalbano	1.NE	15 June 2025				
(France) Trophée Souvenir Roger Walkowiak	1.NE	27 July 2025				
(France) Grand Prix de Cours-la-Ville	1.NE	29 July 2025				
(France) Paris–Bourges	1.NE	13 September 2025				
(France) Classique Puisaye-Forterre	1.NE	28 September 2025				

=== Gravel Races ===
Race	Date	Cat. †	Winner	Second	Third	Ref
(Denmark) COLD Series Vejle	25 January 2025	Gravel	(Denmark) Nicklas Amdi Pedersen; Unibet Tietema Rockets	(Denmark) Niels Bech Rasmussen	(Denmark) Erik Aagaard; WILLING ABLE Racing	
(United States) Low Gap	26 January 2025	Gravel	(United States) Peter Stetina	(United States) Matthew Wiebe; PAS Racing	(United States) Jurd Hurd	
(Kenya) Safari Race Series Tatu City	1 February 2025	Gravel	(Uganda) Jördan Śchlećk; Team Amani	(Uganda) Charles Kagimu; Team Amani	(Kenya) Bernard Ndung'u	
(Spain) Gravel Tres Cantos	2 February 2025	Gravel	(Spain) Juan Ignacio Pérez	(Spain) Raúl Castrillo	(Spain) Eduardo Talavera	
(United States) Renegade Rambler	2 February 2025	Gravel	(United States) Donoven Francis	(United States) Matteo Vellani	(United States) Robert Mennow	
(Philippines) ATTCK UNRSTRKTD Gravel	8 February 2025	Gravel	(Philippines) Christian Timbang	(Philippines) Emmanuel Dave Montemayor	(Indonesia) Yusuf Kibar	
(Spain) La Bescanonina Gravel	9 February 2025	Gravel	(France) Hugo Drechou	(Czech Republic) Petr Vakoč	(Canada) Ben Perry; Wuzhishan SCOM MVMT Cycling Team	
(Spain); Santa Vall	14–15 February	1	(Denmark) Magnus Bak Klaris; PAS Racing	(Poland) Lukas Malezsewski; Jaro Factory Team	(Germany) Tim Wollenberg; Protective Factory Team	
(Spain); Santa Vall	14–15 February	2	(Denmark) Magnus Bak Klaris; PAS Racing	(Czech Republic) Petr Vakoč; Canyon	(Germany) Paul Voß; Autsaid X Rose Bikes	
(Spain); Santa Vall	14–15 February	Overall	(Denmark) Magnus Bak Klaris; PAS Racing; Winner	(Poland) Lukas Malezsewski; Jaro Factory Team; 2nd place	(Germany) Tim Wollenberg; Protective Factory Team; 3rd place	
(New Zealand) The Graveler	15 February 2025	Gravel	(New Zealand) Cameron Jones	(New Zealand) Craig Oliver	(New Zealand) Jeremy Presbury	
(Spain) UCI Gravel World Series – Castellon Gravel Race	15 February 2025	Gravel	(Spain) Alejandro Valverde	(Portugal) Tiago Ferreira	(Italy) Matteo Fontana	
(Slovenia) Parenzana Gravel Race	16 February 2025	Gravel	(Austria) Michael Holland	(Slovenia) Adam Jordan	(Slovenia) Mitja Klavora	
(Costa Rica) Campeonato Panamericano Gravel	22 February 2025	Gravel				
(United States) Huffmaster Hopper	22 February 2025	Gravel	(United States) Brennan Wertz	(United States) Lance Haidet	(United States) Tim McBirney	
(Colombia); Transcordilleras	23 February – 2 March	1	(Australia) Lachlan Morton	(Switzerland) Simon Pellaud; Li-Ning Star	(United States) Griffin Easter	
(Colombia); Transcordilleras	23 February – 2 March	2	(Switzerland) Simon Pellaud; Li-Ning Star	(United States) Griffin Easter	(Australia) Lachlan Morton	
(Colombia); Transcordilleras	23 February – 2 March	3	(United States) Griffin Easter	(Switzerland) Simon Pellaud; Li-Ning Star	(Australia) Lachlan Morton	
(Colombia); Transcordilleras	23 February – 2 March	4	(Switzerland) Simon Pellaud; Li-Ning Star	(Australia) Lachlan Morton	(Colombia) Ricardo Yepes	
(Colombia); Transcordilleras	23 February – 2 March	5	(Switzerland) Simon Pellaud; Li-Ning Star	(United States) Griffin Easter	(Australia) Lachlan Morton	
(Colombia); Transcordilleras	23 February – 2 March	6	(United States) Griffin Easter	(Australia) Lachlan Morton	(Switzerland) Simon Pellaud; Li-Ning Star	
(Colombia); Transcordilleras	23 February – 2 March	7	(Denmark) Magnus Bak Klaris; PAS Racing	(Czech Republic) Petr Vakoč; Canyon	(Germany) Paul Voß; Autsaid X Rose Bikes	
(Colombia); Transcordilleras	23 February – 2 March	8	(Denmark) Magnus Bak Klaris; PAS Racing	(Czech Republic) Petr Vakoč; Canyon	(Germany) Paul Voß; Autsaid X Rose Bikes	
(Colombia); Transcordilleras	23 February – 2 March	Overall	(Denmark) Magnus Bak Klaris; PAS Racing; Winner	(Poland) Lukas Malezsewski; Jaro Factory Team; 2nd place	(Germany) Tim Wollenberg; Protective Factory Team; 3rd place	
(Morocco); Sahara Gravel	24–27 February	1	(Italy) Matteo Fontana; Swatt Club	(Czech Republic) Petr Vakoč	(Australia) Nathan Haas	
(Morocco); Sahara Gravel	24–27 February	2	(Italy) Matteo Fontana; Swatt Club	(Czech Republic) Petr Vakoč	(United States) Payson McElveen	
(Morocco); Sahara Gravel	24–27 February	3	(United States) Payson McElveen	(Italy) Matteo Fontana; Swatt Club	(Belgium) Thomas De Gendt; Classified X Rose Team	
(Morocco); Sahara Gravel	24–27 February	4	(Czech Republic) Petr Vakoč	(United States) Payson McElveen	(Netherlands) Mathijs Loman; Swatt Club	
(Morocco); Sahara Gravel	24–27 February	Overall	(Italy) Matteo Fontana; Swatt Club; Winner	(Czech Republic) Petr Vakoč 2nd place	(United States) Payson McElveen 3rd place	

=== Stage races (2.NE) ===
Race	Date	Cat. †	Winner	Second	Third	Ref
4–7 January	(Venezuela); Vuelta Ciclistica a Bramón	1	(Venezuela) Gusneiver Gil; Confitería La Guacamaya	(Venezuela) Luis Díaz; Lotería del Táchira	(Venezuela) Ángel Rivas; Team Trululu	
4–7 January	(Venezuela); Vuelta Ciclistica a Bramón	2	(Venezuela) Roniel Campos; Team Trululu	(Venezuela) Luis Mora; Gob. Trujillo - MPP Comercio	(Venezuela) Ángel Rivas; Team Trululu	
4–7 January	(Venezuela); Vuelta Ciclistica a Bramón	3	(Venezuela) Manuel Medina; Lotería del Táchira	(Venezuela) José Castillo; Team Trululu	(Venezuela) Gusneiver Gil; Confitería La Guacamaya	
4–7 January	(Venezuela); Vuelta Ciclistica a Bramón	Overall	(Venezuela) Gusneiver Gil; Confitería La Guacamaya; Winner	(Venezuela) Ángel Rivas; Team Trululu; 2nd place	(Venezuela) Luis Díaz; Lotería del Táchira; 3rd place	
4–5 January	(Chile); Vuelta de la Leche	1	(Argentina) Denis Heredia	(Chile) Eduardo Quintanilla	(Chile) Ramon Rojas Faúndez	
4–5 January	(Chile); Vuelta de la Leche	2	(Chile) Abraham Paredes	(Chile) Alonso Córdova	(Chile) Ramon Rojas Faúndez	
4–5 January	(Chile); Vuelta de la Leche	Overall	(Argentina) Denis Heredia Winner	(Chile) Ramon Rojas Faúndez 2nd place	(Chile) Eduardo Quintanilla 3rd place	
9–12 January	(Algeria) Tour de Ghardaia	1	(Algeria) Islam Mansouri; Madar Pro Cycling Team	(Algeria) Hamza Amari; Madar Pro Cycling Team	(Algeria) Yacine Hamza; Madar Pro Cycling Team	
9–12 January	(Algeria) Tour de Ghardaia	2	(Algeria) Youcef Reguigui; Madar Pro Cycling Team	(Algeria) Hamza Amari; Madar Pro Cycling Team	(Algeria) Ayoub Sahiri; Madar Pro Cycling Team	
9–12 January	(Algeria) Tour de Ghardaia	3	(Algeria) Hamza Amari; Madar Pro Cycling Team	(Algeria) Yacine Hamza; Madar Pro Cycling Team	(Algeria) Islam Mansouri; Madar Pro Cycling Team	
9–12 January	(Algeria) Tour de Ghardaia	4	(Algeria) Islam Mansouri; Madar Pro Cycling Team	(Algeria) Yacine Hamza; Madar Pro Cycling Team	(Algeria) Hamza Amari; Madar Pro Cycling Team	
9–12 January	(Algeria) Tour de Ghardaia	Overall	(Algeria) Islam Mansouri; Madar Pro Cycling Team; Winner	(Algeria) Yacine Hamza; Madar Pro Cycling Team; 2nd place	(Algeria) Hamza Amari; Madar Pro Cycling Team; 3rd place	
10–12 January	Tour del Sur de Chile	1	(Chile) Abraham Paredes	(Chile) Alonso Córdova	(Chile) Pablo Alarcón	
10–12 January	Tour del Sur de Chile	2	(Argentina) Denis Heredia	(Chile) Alonso Córdova	(Chile) Victor Hrdina	
10–12 January	Tour del Sur de Chile	3				
10–12 January	Tour del Sur de Chile	Overall	Winner	2nd place	3rd place	
17–19 January	(Mexico); Copa Ciclista Coahuila	1	(Mexico) José Aguirre	(Mexico) José Miguel Reyes	(Mexico) Jorge Andrés Segura García	
17–19 January	(Mexico); Copa Ciclista Coahuila	2	(Mexico) José Miguel Reyes	(Mexico) José Antonio Prieto; Petrolike	(Mexico) José Pueblito Hernández	
17–19 January	(Mexico); Copa Ciclista Coahuila	3	(Mexico) José Infante	(Mexico) David Gaona Vázquez	(Mexico) Chris Hans	
17–19 January	(Mexico); Copa Ciclista Coahuila	Overall	(Mexico) José Miguel Reyes Winner	(Mexico) José Pueblito Hernández 2nd place	(Mexico) José Maria Alcocer 3rd place	
18–20 January	(Australia) SA Kick It	1	(Australia) Ronan Teese; Bendigo & District CC	(Australia) Jack Ward; Team Brennan p/b TP32	(Australia) Finn Walsh; CCACHE x BODYWRAP	
18–20 January	(Australia) SA Kick It	2	(Australia) Blake Agnoletto	(Australia) Josh Duffy; Tasmanian Institute of Sports	(United States) Graeme Frislie; CCACHE x BODYWRAP	
18–20 January	(Australia) SA Kick It	3	(South Africa) Brendon Davids; Team Brennan p/b TP32	(Australia) Tynan Shannon; Royal Bikes	(Australia) Blake Agnoletto	
18–20 January	(Australia) SA Kick It	Overall	(South Africa) Brendon Davids; Team Brennan p/b TP32; Winner	(Australia) Tynan Shannon; Royal Bikes; 2nd place	(Australia) Jack Ward; Team Brennan p/b TP32; 3rd place	
24 January – 2 February	(Argentina) Vuelta a San Juan	Prologue	(Argentina) Tomás Moyano; Portal de San Juan	(Argentina) Rodrigo Alejandro Silva; Sindicato de Empleados Públicos of San Juan	(Chile) Abraham Paredes; Municipalidad de Pocito	
24 January – 2 February	(Argentina) Vuelta a San Juan	1	(Argentina) Nicolás Tivani; Municipalidad de Pocito	(Argentina) Ángel Oropel; Chimbas Te Quiero	(Brazil) Vinícius Rangel; Swift Pro Cycling	
24 January – 2 February	(Argentina) Vuelta a San Juan	2	(Brazil) Kacio Fonseca; Swift Pro Cycling	(Argentina) Nicolás Tivani; Municipalidad de Pocito	(Argentina) Kevin Castro; Metales Concepcion	
24 January – 2 February	(Argentina) Vuelta a San Juan	3 TTT	(Argentina) Municipalidad de Pocito	(Argentina) Sindicato de Empleados Publicos de San Juan	(Chile) Template:Cycling data PPZ	
24 January – 2 February	(Argentina) Vuelta a San Juan	4	(Chile) Jacob Decar; STAMINA Racing	(Brazil) Kacio Fonseca; Swift Pro Cycling	(Argentina) Nicolás Tivani; Municipalidad de Pocito	
24 January – 2 February	(Argentina) Vuelta a San Juan	5	(Chile) Héctor Quintana; Template:Cycling data PPZ	(Argentina) Leandro Velardez; Diberbool	(Chile) Jacob Decar; STAMINA Racing	
24 January – 2 February	(Argentina) Vuelta a San Juan	6	(Argentina) Leonardo Cobarrubia; Sindicato de Empleados Publicos de San Juan	(Chile) Jacob Decar; STAMINA Racing	(Brazil) Kacio Fonseca; Swift Pro Cycling	
24 January – 2 February	(Argentina) Vuelta a San Juan	7	(Chile) Jacob Decar; STAMINA Racing	(Argentina) Bernardo Gastón Cambareri; Mani Zabala	(Colombia) Miguel Flórez; Diberbool	
24 January – 2 February	(Argentina) Vuelta a San Juan	8	(Chile) Francisco Kotsakis; Template:Cycling data PPZ	(Brazil) Kacio Fonseca; Swift Pro Cycling	(Argentina) Nicolás Tivani; Municipalidad de Pocito	
24 January – 2 February	(Argentina) Vuelta a San Juan	9	(Argentina) Leonardo Cobarrubia; Sindicato de Empleados Publicos de San Juan	(Brazil) Kacio Fonseca; Swift Pro Cycling	(Argentina) Augusto Valentín Castro; Municipalidad de Pocito	
24 January – 2 February	(Argentina) Vuelta a San Juan	Overall	(Argentina) Nicolás Tivani; Municipalidad de Pocito; Winner	(Argentina) Rodrigo Díaz; Municipalidad de Pocito; 2nd place	(Argentina) Rubén Ramos; Chimbas Te Quiero; 3rd place	
31 January – 1 February	(Algeria) Tour international des Zibans	1	(Algeria) El Khacib Sassane; Mouloudia Club d'Alger	(Algeria) Riad Bakhti; Madar Formation Cycling Team	(Algeria) Slimane Badlis; Mouloudia Club d'Alger	
31 January – 1 February	(Algeria) Tour international des Zibans	2	(Algeria) Oussama Mimouni; Madar Pro Cycling Team	(Algeria) Anes Boudjemaa; NRDI Dely-Ibrahim	(Algeria) El Khacib Sassane; Mouloudia Club d'Alger	
31 January – 1 February	(Algeria) Tour international des Zibans	Overall	(Algeria) Oussama Mimouni; Madar Pro Cycling Team; Winner	(Algeria) El Khacib Sassane; Mouloudia Club d'Alger; 2nd place	(Algeria) Mohamed Daid; Majd El Guerara; 3rd place	
31 January – 2 February	(Uruguay) Tour de San Carlos	1	(Uruguay) Agustín Alonso	(Uruguay) Ignacio Raúl Maldonado	(Uruguay) Matías Presa	
31 January – 2 February	(Uruguay) Tour de San Carlos	2	(Uruguay) Leonel Rodríguez	(Uruguay) Matías Presa	(Argentina) Sergio Fredes	
31 January – 2 February	(Uruguay) Tour de San Carlos	3	(Argentina) Sergio Fredes	(Uruguay) Matías Presa	(Uruguay) Ignacio Raúl Maldonado	
31 January – 2 February	(Uruguay) Tour de San Carlos	Overall	(Uruguay) Ignacio Raúl Maldonado Winner	(Uruguay) Matías Presa 2nd place	(Argentina) Sergio Fredes 3rd place	
6–9 February	(Argentina) Giro del Sol San Juan	1	(Argentina) Marcos Méndez	(Argentina) Alejandro Quilci	(Argentina) Rodrigo Díaz	
6–9 February	(Argentina) Giro del Sol San Juan	2	(Argentina) Daniel Juárez	(Argentina) Ángel Oropel	(Argentina) Leonardo Cobarrubia	
6–9 February	(Argentina) Giro del Sol San Juan	3	(Argentina) Marcos Méndez; Foundation Cycling New York	(Argentina) Rodrigo Díaz	(Argentina) Leonardo Cobarrubia	
6–9 February	(Argentina) Giro del Sol San Juan	4	(Argentina) Leonardo Cobarrubia	(Argentina) Marcos Méndez; Foundation Cycling New York	(Argentina) Augusto Valentín Castro	
6–9 February	(Argentina) Giro del Sol San Juan	Overall	(Argentina) Marcos Méndez; Foundation Cycling New York; Winner	(Argentina) Leonardo Cobarrubia 2nd place	(Argentina) Daniel Juárez 3rd place	
7–9 February	(Spain) Vuelta Ciclista al Guadalentín	1	(Spain) Pablo Ortega; High Level-Gsport-Grupo Tormo	(Spain) Iván Palomeque; Essax - SVICO Foundation - Grupo Arrfran	(Spain) Sergio Geerlings; Caja Rural - Alea	
7–9 February	(Spain) Vuelta Ciclista al Guadalentín	2	(Spain) José María Martín; Extremadura - Pebetero	(Spain) Juan Pedro Lozano; Caja Rural - Alea	(Spain) Pablo Ortega; High Level-Gsport-Grupo Tormo	
7–9 February	(Spain) Vuelta Ciclista al Guadalentín	3	(Republic of Ireland) Ewan Warren	(Spain) Pablo Ortega; High Level-Gsport-Grupo Tormo	(Spain) Adrian Benito; Extremadura - Pebetero	
7–9 February	(Spain) Vuelta Ciclista al Guadalentín	Overall	(Spain) Pablo Ortega; High Level-Gsport-Grupo Tormo; Winner	(Spain) Adrian Benito; Extremadura - Pebetero; 2nd place	(Spain) Iván Palomeque; Essax - SVICO Foundation - Grupo Arrfran; 3rd place	
8–9 February	(France) Grand Prix de l'UCS	1	(France) Christopher Hippolyte; VC Diamantinois	(France) Marc Flavien; Madinina Bikers	(France) Antoine Gauran; VC Diamantinois	
8–9 February	(France) Grand Prix de l'UCS	2	(France) Kyllian Boscher; VC Diamantinois	(France) William Melinard; Madinina Bikers	(France) Laurent Neror; Jeunesse Cycliste 231	
8–9 February	(France) Grand Prix de l'UCS	Overall	(France) Kyllian Boscher; VC Diamantinois; Winner	(France) Laurent Neror; Jeunesse Cycliste 231; 2nd place	(France) William Melinard; Madinina Bikers; 3rd place	
11–16 February	(Senegal) Tour du Fleuve	1	(Morocco) Zouhair Rahil; Sidi Ali–Unlock Sports Team	(Senegal) Eumeu Lo	(Senegal) Omar Gueye	
11–16 February	(Senegal) Tour du Fleuve	2	(Morocco) Zouhair Rahil; Sidi Ali–Unlock Sports Team	(The Gambia) Jammeh Alieu	(Mali) Ousmane Diallo	
11–16 February	(Senegal) Tour du Fleuve	3	(Morocco) Zouhair Rahil; Sidi Ali–Unlock Sports Team	(Senegal) Bakary Seck	(Mali) Ousmane Diallo	
11–16 February	(Senegal) Tour du Fleuve	4	(Senegal) Eumeu Lo	(Morocco) Zouhair Rahil; Sidi Ali–Unlock Sports Team	(Senegal) Moustapha Mbow	
11–16 February	(Senegal) Tour du Fleuve	5	(Morocco) Zouhair Rahil; Sidi Ali–Unlock Sports Team	(Senegal) Eumeu Lo	(The Gambia) Jammeh Alieu	
11–16 February	(Senegal) Tour du Fleuve	6	(Morocco) Zouhair Rahil; Sidi Ali–Unlock Sports Team	(Senegal) Amsatou Seye	(Senegal) Bakary Seck	
11–16 February	(Senegal) Tour du Fleuve	Overall	(Morocco) Zouhair Rahil; Sidi Ali–Unlock Sports Team; Winner	(The Gambia) Jammeh Alieu 2nd place	(Senegal) Eumeu Lo 3rd place	
12–16 February	(Guatemala) Tour Por La Paz Justa	1	(Mexico) Miguel Díaz; Olinka Specialized	(Mexico) Ramón Muñiz; Olinka Specialized	(Colombia) Marlón Garzón	
12–16 February	(Guatemala) Tour Por La Paz Justa	2	(Mexico) Fausto Esparza; Olinka Specialized	(Colombia) Marlón Garzón	(Mexico) Ramón Muñiz; Olinka Specialized	
12–16 February	(Guatemala) Tour Por La Paz Justa	3	(Mexico) Fausto Esparza; Olinka Specialized	(Colombia) Fernando Jarava	(Mexico) Ramón Muñiz; Olinka Specialized	
12–16 February	(Guatemala) Tour Por La Paz Justa	4	(Dominican Republic) Alberto Ramos; Foundation Cycling New York	(Mexico) Ramón Muñiz; Olinka Specialized	(Colombia) Fernando Jarava	
12–16 February	(Guatemala) Tour Por La Paz Justa	5	(Mexico) Ramón Muñiz; Olinka Specialized	(Mexico) Carlos MacPherson; Olinka Specialized	(Mexico) Fernando Nava; Olinka Specialized	
12–16 February	(Guatemala) Tour Por La Paz Justa	Overall	(Mexico) Miguel Díaz; Olinka Specialized; Winner	(Mexico) Ramón Muñiz; Olinka Specialized; 2nd place	(Mexico) Fausto Esparza; Olinka Specialized; 3rd place	
13–16 February	(Uruguay) Vuelta Ciclista Chaná	1	(Uruguay) Leonel Rodríguez; CC Cerro Largo	(Uruguay) Pablo Anchieri; Dolores Cicles Club	(Uruguay) Nicolás Méndez; CC Barrio Artigas	
13–16 February	(Uruguay) Vuelta Ciclista Chaná	2	(Uruguay) Matías Presa; CC Cerro Largo	(Uruguay) Pablo Anchieri; Dolores Cicles Club	(Uruguay) Roderick Asconeguy; Audax	
13–16 February	(Uruguay) Vuelta Ciclista Chaná	3	(Argentina) Sergio Fredes; Armonía Cycles	(Uruguay) Diego Jamen; CC Punta del Este	(Uruguay) Agustín Alonso; Nautico Boca de Cufre	
13–16 February	(Uruguay) Vuelta Ciclista Chaná	4				
13–16 February	(Uruguay) Vuelta Ciclista Chaná	Overall	(Argentina) Sergio Fredes; Armonía Cycles; Winner	(Uruguay) Diego Jamen; CC Punta del Este; 2nd place	(Uruguay) Agustín Alonso; Nautico Boca de Cufre; 3rd place	
14–16 February	(Turkey) Tour of Pedalia	Prologue	(Turkey) Burak Abay; Konya Büyükşehir Belediyespor	(Turkey) Samet Bulut; Konya Büyükşehir Belediyespor	(Turkey) Ahmet Örken; Spor Toto	
14–16 February	(Turkey) Tour of Pedalia	2	(Turkey) Burak Abay; Konya Büyükşehir Belediyespor	(Kazakhstan) Mikhail Podluzhnyy; Team Vino–North Qazaqstan Region	Orken Slamzhanov; Kazakhstan (national team)	
14–16 February	(Turkey) Tour of Pedalia	3	(Turkey) Ahmet Örken; Spor Toto	(Turkey) Mustafa Ayyorkun; Spor Toto	(Turkey) Burak Abay; Konya Büyükşehir Belediyespor	
14–16 February	(Turkey) Tour of Pedalia	Overall	(Turkey) Burak Abay; Konya Büyükşehir Belediyespor; Winner	(Turkey) Samet Bulut; Konya Büyükşehir Belediyespor; 2nd place	(Turkey) Ahmet Örken; Spor Toto; 3rd place	
14–16 February	(United States) Valley of the Sun Stage Race	1	(United States) Cory Lockwood; Miami Blazers	(United States) Tim McBirney	(United States) Coren Hendricks	
14–16 February	(United States) Valley of the Sun Stage Race	2	(Canada) Carson Mattern; TaG Cycling	(United States) Eddy Huntsman; VDM-Trawobo Cycling Team	(France) Maxime Richard	
14–16 February	(United States) Valley of the Sun Stage Race	3	(Belize) Cory Williams; Miami Blazers	(United States) Tyler Williams; Miami Blazers	(Mexico) Juan Enrique Aldapa	
14–16 February	(United States) Valley of the Sun Stage Race	Overall	(Canada) Carson Mattern; TaG Cycling; Winner	(United States) Cory Lockwood; Miami Blazers; 2nd place	(United States) Tim McBirney 3rd place	
14–16 February	(Colombia) Clásica de Rionegro	1	(Colombia) Walter Vargas; Team Medellín–EPM	Rodrigo Contreras; Nu Colombia	(Colombia) Diego Camargo; Team Medellín–EPM	
14–16 February	(Colombia) Clásica de Rionegro	2	(Colombia) Cristian Damián Vélez; GW Erco Shimano	Jonathan Guatibonza; Nu Colombia U23	(Colombia) Jhonatan Restrepo; Orgullo Paisa	
14–16 February	(Colombia) Clásica de Rionegro	3	(Colombia) Kevin Castillo; Team Sistecredito	(Colombia) Alejandro Osorio; Orgullo Paisa	Rodrigo Contreras; Nu Colombia	
14–16 February	(Colombia) Clásica de Rionegro	Overall	(Colombia) Rodrigo Contreras; Nu Colombia; Winner	(Colombia) Jeferson Armando Ruiz; GW Erco Shimano; 2nd place	(Colombia) Diego Camargo; Team Medellín–EPM; 3rd place	
16–18 February	(Belize) DigiWallet Valentine's Cycling Tour	1	(Belize) Carlton Robinson	(Belize) Giovanni Lovell	(Belize) Kenyon Stanford	
16–18 February	(Belize) DigiWallet Valentine's Cycling Tour	2	(Belize) Gregory Lovell	(Belize) Kenroy Gladden	(Belize) Giovanni Lovell	
16–18 February	(Belize) DigiWallet Valentine's Cycling Tour	3	(Belize) Carlton Robinson	(Belize) Giovanni Lovell	(Belize) Jaylen Briceno	
16–18 February	(Belize) DigiWallet Valentine's Cycling Tour	Overall	(Belize) Carlton Robinson Winner	(Belize) Giovanni Lovell 2nd place	(Belize) Jaylen Briceno 3rd place	
15–23 February	(France) Circuit des Plages Vendéennes	1	(United Kingdom) Matthew Fox; Véloce Club Rouen 76	(France) Tom Mainguenaud; Mayenne-V and B-Monbana	(France) Yanis Seguin; UC Cholet 49	
15–23 February	(France) Circuit des Plages Vendéennes	2	(France) Lucas Mainguenaud; Vendée U Pays de la Loire	(France) Max Delarue; Véloce Club Rouen 76	(France) Tom Mainguenaud; Mayenne-V and B-Monbana	
15–23 February	(France) Circuit des Plages Vendéennes	3	(South Africa) Blaine Kieck; CC Villeneuve Saint Germain	(France) Mathis Guerinel; Paris Cycliste Olympique	(France) Paul Conor; UC Cholet 49	
15–23 February	(France) Circuit des Plages Vendéennes	4	(France) Emmanuel Houcou; Arkéa–B&B Hôtels Continentale	(France) Maxime Meynard; Vendée U Pays de la Loire	(France) Damien Ridel; Team EliteOrga US Saint-Herblain	
15–23 February	(France) Circuit des Plages Vendéennes	5	(France) Arkéa–B&B Hôtels Continentale	(France) Vendée U Pays de la Loire	(France) Team Adris-La Crêpe de Brocéliande-BLC	
15–23 February	(France) Circuit des Plages Vendéennes	6	(France) Emmanuel Houcou; Arkéa–B&B Hôtels Continentale	(France) Damien Ridel; Team EliteOrga US Saint-Herblain	(France) Anatole Leboucher; UC Cholet 49	
15–23 February	(France) Circuit des Plages Vendéennes	Overall	(United Kingdom) Matthew Fox; Véloce Club Rouen 76; Winner	(France) Florentin Lecamus-Lambert; Véloce Club Rouen 76; 2nd place	(France) Damien Ridel; Team EliteOrga US Saint-Herblain; 3rd place	
15–16 February	(Ecuador) Yo vivo seguro	1	(Ecuador) Harold Martín López; XDS Astana Team	Richard Huera; Best PC Ecuador	Luis Monteros; Best PC Ecuador	
15–16 February	(Ecuador) Yo vivo seguro	2	(Ecuador) Wilson Haro	Richard Huera; Best PC Ecuador	(Ecuador) Harold Martín López; XDS Astana Team	
15–16 February	(Ecuador) Yo vivo seguro	Overall	(Ecuador) Harold Martín López; XDS Astana Team; Winner	(Ecuador) Richard Huera; Best PC Ecuador; 2nd place	(Ecuador) Luis Monteros; Best PC Ecuador; 3rd place	
15–16 February	(Spain) Memorial Manuel Sanroma	1	(Spain) Iker Gómez; Equipo Finisher - Kern Pharma	(Spain) Francesc Bennassar; Club Ciclista Padronés - Cortizo	(Spain) Mateu Estelrich; Súper Froiz	
15–16 February	(Spain) Memorial Manuel Sanroma	2	(Spain) Sergio Geerlings; Caja Rural-Alea	(Spain) Joan Martí Bennassar; High Level-GSport	(Spain) Alberto Fernández Reviejo; Caja Rural-Alea	
15–16 February	(Spain) Memorial Manuel Sanroma	3	(Spain) Jordi Artigues; Club Ciclista Padronés - Cortizo	Daniil Kazakov; PC Baix Ebre	(Republic of Ireland) Ewan Warren; Natural Greatness - Rali - Alé	
15–16 February	(Spain) Memorial Manuel Sanroma	Overall	Daniil Kazakov; PC Baix Ebre; Winner	(Spain) Joan Martí Bennassar; High Level-GSport; 2nd place	(Spain) Estanislao Calabuig; Caja Rural-Alea; 3rd place	
15–23 February	(Argentina) Vuelta a Mendoza	Prologue	(Argentina) Matías Ezequiel Contreras	(Argentina) Tomás Moyano	(Argentina) Franco Vecchi	
15–23 February	(Argentina) Vuelta a Mendoza	1	(Argentina) Tomás Moyano	(Argentina) Julian Barrientos	(Argentina) Enzo Ariel Tallarico	
15–23 February	(Argentina) Vuelta a Mendoza	2	(Argentina) Leonardo Cobarrubia; Sindicato de Empleados Publicos de San Juan	(Canada) Reid Kinniburgh; TaG Cycling	(Argentina) Marcos Méndez	
15–23 February	(Argentina) Vuelta a Mendoza	3	(Argentina) Leonardo Cobarrubia; Sindicato de Empleados Publicos de San Juan	(Argentina) Leandro Velardez	(Chile) José Autrán; Sindicato de Empleados Publicos de San Juan	
15–23 February	(Argentina) Vuelta a Mendoza	4	(Argentina) Tomás Moyano	(Chile) José Autrán; Sindicato de Empleados Publicos de San Juan	(Argentina) Franco Vecchi	
15–23 February	(Argentina) Vuelta a Mendoza	5	(Bolivia) José Manuel Aramayo; Pío Rico Cycling Team	(Argentina) Arián Etcheverry	(Argentina) Franco Vecchi	
15–23 February	(Argentina) Vuelta a Mendoza	6	(Argentina) Mauricio Páez	(Argentina) Leandro Velardez	(Argentina) Tomás Ruiz	
15–23 February	(Argentina) Vuelta a Mendoza	7	(Argentina) Nicolas Traico	(Peru) Royner Navarro	(Canada) Nathan Pruner; TaG Cycling	
15–23 February	(Argentina) Vuelta a Mendoza	Overall	(Spain) Pablo Ortega; High Level-Gsport-Grupo Tormo; Winner	(Spain) Adrian Benito; Extremadura - Pebetero; 2nd place	(Spain) Iván Palomeque; Essax - SVICO Foundation - Grupo Arrfran; 3rd place	
21–23 February	(Australia) Tour of Tasmania	1	(Australia) Kurt Eather; CCACHE x BODYWRAP	(Australia) Blake Agnoletto; Team Brennan p/b TP32	(Australia) Zac Marriage; Butterfields Ziptrak Racing	
21–23 February	(Australia) Tour of Tasmania	2	(Australia) Hamish McKenzie; Tasmanian Institute of Sports	(Australia) Jack Ward; Team Brennan p/b TP32	(Australia) Zac Marriage; Butterfields Ziptrak Racing	
21–23 February	(Australia) Tour of Tasmania	3	(Australia) Oliver Bleddyn; Team Brennan p/b TP32	(Australia) Zac Marriage; Butterfields Ziptrak Racing	(Australia) Blake Agnoletto; Team Brennan p/b TP32	
21–23 February	(Australia) Tour of Tasmania	4	(Australia) Jack Ward; Team Brennan p/b TP32	(Australia) Zac Marriage; Butterfields Ziptrak Racing	(Australia) Oliver Sims; Cobra9 Leigh Surveying	
21–23 February	(Australia) Tour of Tasmania	Overall	(Australia) Jack Ward; Team Brennan p/b TP32; Winner	(Australia) Zac Marriage; Butterfields Ziptrak Racing; 2nd place	(Australia) Oliver Bleddyn; Team Brennan p/b TP32; 3rd place	
21–23 February	(United States) Tucson Bicycle Classic	1	(United States) Elouan Gardon	(United States) Jonas Walton	(United States) Patrick Welch	
21–23 February	(United States) Tucson Bicycle Classic	2	(United States) Nathan Cusack	(United States) Nolan Church	(United States) Luke Elphingstone	
21–23 February	(United States) Tucson Bicycle Classic	3	(United States) Nathan Cusack	(United States) Adin Papell	(Canada) Campbell Parrish	
21–23 February	(United States) Tucson Bicycle Classic	4	(United States) Nathan Cusack	(United States) Elias Saigh	(United States) Adin Papell	
21–23 February	(United States) Tucson Bicycle Classic	Overall	(United States) Patrick Welch Winner	(Canada) Carson Mattern 2nd place	(United States) Elouan Gardon 3rd place	
24 February – 2 March	(Dominican Republic) Vuelta a la Independencia Nacional	1	(Colombia) Róbigzon Oyola; Team Medellín–EPM	(Spain) Óscar Sevilla; Team Medellín–EPM	(France) Meving Gène; Convergence SC Abymienne Propreté 2000	
24 February – 2 March	(Dominican Republic) Vuelta a la Independencia Nacional	2	(Dominican Republic) Deivy Capellán; El Boro Cycling Team	(Dominican Republic) César Alberto Marte; Asocipe - Moca	(Dominican Republic) Alberto Rafael Ramos; El Boro Cycling Team	
24 February – 2 March	(Dominican Republic) Vuelta a la Independencia Nacional	3	(Colombia) Yesid Pira; Inteja Imca	(Colombia) Daniel Hoyos; Prestige Cycling - Puerto Rico	(Colombia) Wilmar Paredes; Team Medellín–EPM	
24 February – 2 March	(Dominican Republic) Vuelta a la Independencia Nacional	4	(Cuba) Rubén Companioni; City Bikes Miami	Elvys Reyes; Prestige Cycling - Puerto Rico	(France) Mathieu Pellegrin; Convergence SC Abymienne Propreté 2000	
24 February – 2 March	(Dominican Republic) Vuelta a la Independencia Nacional	5	(Belize) Derrick Chavarria; Phoenix International Cayman	(Cuba) Emilio Pérez Labrador; City Bikes Miami	(Dominican Republic) Anderson Aracena; Verrazano - Santiago	
24 February – 2 March	(Dominican Republic) Vuelta a la Independencia Nacional	Overall	(United States) Patrick Welch Winner	(Canada) Carson Mattern 2nd place	(United States) Elouan Gardon 3rd place	
