= 2018 UCI Africa Tour =

- Fourteenth edition of the UCI Africa Tour

Details
- Dates: 27 October 2017–30 September 2018
- Location: Africa
- Races: 20

The 2018 UCI Africa Tour was the 14th season of the UCI Africa Tour. The season began on 27 October 2017 with the Tour du Faso and ended on 30 September 2018.

The points leader, based on the cumulative results of previous races, wears the UCI Africa Tour cycling jersey.

Throughout the season, points are awarded to the top finishers of stages within stage races and the final general classification standings of each of the stages races and one-day events. The quality and complexity of a race also determines how many points are awarded to the top finishers: the higher the UCI rating of a race, the more points are awarded. The UCI ratings from highest to lowest are as follows:

- Multi-day events: 2.HC, 2.1 and 2.2
- One-day events: 1.HC, 1.1 and 1.2

== Events ==
=== 2017 ===
Date	Race Name	Location	UCI Rating	Winner	Team
27 October–5 November	Tour du Faso	Burkina Faso	2.2	Salah Eddine Mraouni (MAR)	Kuwait–Cartucho.es
12–19 November	Tour of Rwanda	Rwanda	2.2	Joseph Areruya (RWA)	Q36.5 Continental Team

=== 2018 ===
Date	Race Name	Location	UCI Rating	Winner	Team
15–21 January	La Tropicale Amissa Bongo	Gabon	2.1	Joseph Areruya (RWA)	Rwanda (national team)
26–29 January	Tour International des Zibans	Algeria	2.2	Abdellah Hida (MAR)	Morocco (national team)
31 January–4 February	Tour de l'Espoir	Cameroon	2.Ncup	Joseph Areruya (RWA)	Rwanda (national team)
7–11 February	Tour of South Africa	South Africa	2.1	Cancelled	
20–23 February	Grand Prix International de la ville d'Alger	Algeria	2.2	Charalampos Kastrantas (GRE)	Java Partizan
1 March	Les Challenges de la Marche Verte– GP Sakia El Hamra	Morocco	1.2	Cancelled	
3 March	Les Challenges de la Marche Verte– GP Oued Eddahab	Morocco	1.2	Cancelled	
4 March	Les Challenges de la Marche Verte– GP Al Massira	Morocco	1.2	Cancelled	
6 March	Challenge du Prince– Trophée Princier	Morocco	1.2	Cancelled	
8 March	Challenge du Prince– Trophée de l'Anniversaire	Morocco	1.2	Cancelled	
9 March	Challenge du Prince– Trophée de la Maison Royale	Morocco	1.2	Cancelled	
10–18 March	Tour du Cameroun	Cameroon	2.2	Cancelled	
20–21 March	Tour de la Pharmacie Centrale	Tunisia	2.2	Gaëtan Bille (BEL)	Sovac–Natura4Ever
23 March	Grand Prix de la Pharmacie Centrale	Tunisia	1.2	Gruffudd Lewis (GBR)	Ribble Pro Cycling
27 March – 2 April	Tour d'Algérie	Algeria	2.2	Azzedine Lagab (ALG)	Groupement Sportif des Pétroliers d'Algérie
6–15 April	Tour du Maroc	Morocco	2.2	David Rivière (FRA)	Vendée U Pays de la Loire
14 April	Fenkil Northern Red Sea Challenge	Eritrea	1.2	Cancelled	
15 April	Massawa Circuit	Eritrea	1.2	Cancelled	
17–21 April	Tour of Eritrea	Eritrea	2.2	Cancelled	
22–29 April	Tour du Sénégal	Senegal	2.2	Dan Craven (NAM)	Israel Cycling Academy
22 April	Asmara Circuit	Eritrea	1.2	Cancelled	
24–27 April	Tour de Limpopo	South Africa	2.2	Gustav Basson (RSA)	Pro Touuch
4–7 May	Tour International de la Wilaya d'Oran	Algeria	2.2	Laurent Évrard (BEL)	Sovac-Natura4Ever
6 May	100 Cycle Challenge	South Africa	1.2	Nolan Hoffman (RSA)	BCX
26 May–2 June	Tour du Cameroun	Cameroon	2.2	Bonaventure Uwizeyimana (RWA)	Skol Rwanda
5–12 August	Tour du Rwanda	Rwanda	2.2	Samuel Mugisha (RWA)	Dimension Data for Qhubeka
27 August–1 September	Tour Meles Zenawi for Green Development	Ethiopia	2.2	Cancelled	
9–15 September	Tour de Côte d'Ivoire	Ivory Coast	2.2	Issiaka Cissé (CIV)	Ivory Coast (national team)
26–30 September	Grand Prix Chantal Biya	Cameroon	2.2	Juraj Bellan (SVK)	Dukla Banská Bystrica
