= Sovac (cycling team) =

Algerian Cycling Team

Team information
- UCI code: SNE
- Registered: Algeria
- Founded: 2017
- Discipline: Road
- Status: UCI Continental

Team name history
- 2017 2018 2019–: Naturablue; Sovac–Natura4Ever; Sovac

Sovac is an Algerian UCI Continental cycling team founded in 2017. It was originally a club team, but it gained Continental status for the 2018 season. The team was created by former Belgian cyclist Geoffrey Coupé.

== Major results ==
2018
Stages 2 & 4 Tour International des Zibans, Youcef Reguigui
Prologue Grand Prix International de la ville d'Alger, Gaetan Bille
Stage 2 Grand Prix International de la ville d'Alger, Youcef Reguigui
Overall Tour de la Pharmacie Centrale, Gaetan Bille

Stage 1, Youcef Reguigui
Stage 2, Gaetan Bille

Stage 1 Tour d'Algérie, Abderrahmane Mehdi Hamza
Stages 4, 5 & 7 Tour d'Algérie, Youcef Reguigui
Stages 2, 3 & 4 Tour du Sénégal, Youcef Reguigui
Stage 8 Tour du Sénégal, Islam Mansouri
Overall Tour International de la Wilaya d'Oran, Laurent Evrard

Stage 1, Davide Rebellin
Stage 4, Laurent Evrard

2019
Stage 2 Tour of Egypt, Nassim Saidi
Overall Tour du Maroc, Laurent Evrard

== Team roster ==
Rider	Date of birth
Boualem Belmoukhtar (ALG)	March 11, 1993 (age 33)
Gaetan Bille (BEL)	April 6, 1988 (age 38)
Mohamed Bouzidi (ALG)	May 6, 1994 (age 32)
Louis Deguide (BEL)	February 4, 1994 (age 32)
Florian Deriaux (FRA)	5 June 1990 (age 36)
Laurent Evrard (BEL)	September 22, 1990 (age 35)
Alexander Geuens (BEL)	September 5, 1994 (age 32)
Abderrahmane Mehdi Hamza (ALG)	February 19, 1992 (age 34)
Ayoub Karrar (ALG)	2 March 1993 (age 33)

Rider	Date of birth
Matthias Legley (BEL)	15 January 1991 (age 35)
Hamza Mansouri (ALG)	April 13, 1999 (age 27)
Islam Mansouri (ALG)	July 23, 1997 (age 29)
Hicham Mokhtari (ALG)	December 11, 1996 (age 29)
Davide Rebellin (ITA)	August 9, 1971 (age 55)
Youcef Reguigui (ALG)	January 9, 1990 (age 36)
Robin Stenuit (BEL)	16 June 1990 (age 36)
Marco Zamparella (ITA)	1 October 1987 (age 38)
