= Nesrine Houili =

Algerian cyclist (born 2003)

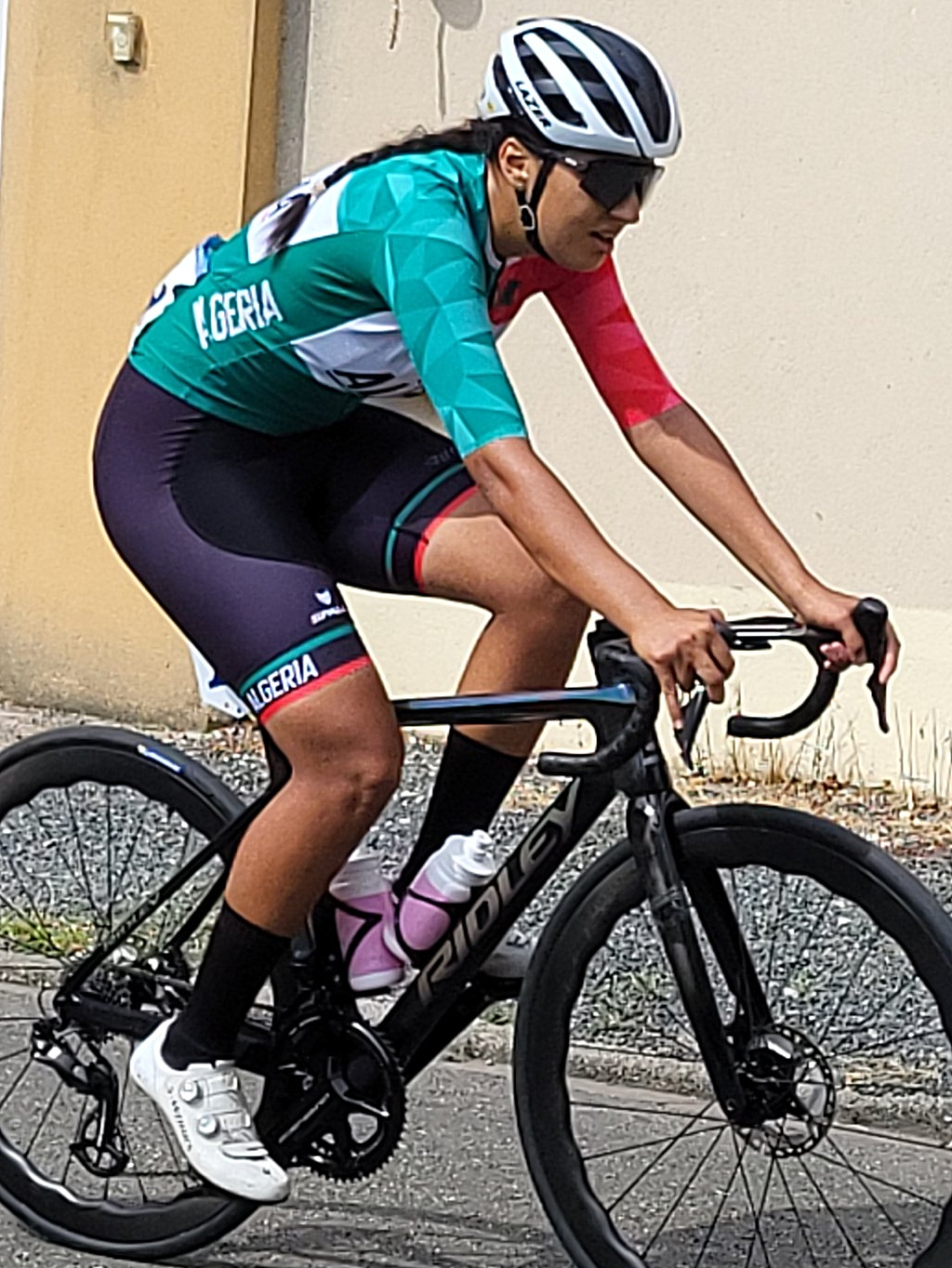
- Houili at the 2024 Summer Olympics

Personal information
- Born: 27 August 2003 (age 23) Oued Tlélat

Cycling career
- Sport: Cycling
- Disciplines: Road; Track
- Role: Rider

Amateur team
- 2022: Mix 3

Professional teams
- 2023: Canyon–SRAM Generation
- 2026: WCC Team
Medal record
Representing Algeria
African Games
Gold medal – first place	2024 Accra	Under-23 road race
Silver medal – second place	2024 Accra	Under-23 time trial
Arab Games
Gold medal – first place	2023 Algeria	Time trial
Gold medal – first place	2023 Algeria	Team time trial
African Road Championships
Gold medal – first place	2022 Sharm El Sheikh	Time trial
Gold medal – first place	2023 Accra	Under-23 Time trial
Gold medal – first place	2025 Kwale	Under-23 Time trial
Bronze medal – third place	2025 Kwale	Mixed-team time trial
Arab Championships
Gold medal – first place	2023 Riyadh	Time trial
Gold medal – first place	2023 Riyadh	Team time trial
Silver medal – second place	2023 Riyadh	Road race

Nesrine Houili (Arabic: نسرين حويلي; born 27 August 2003) is an Algerian road and track cyclist who currently competes under the Algerian national team. She previously competed for UCI Continental team Canyon-SRAM Generation during the 2023 season.

== Career ==
Houili has found success in African competitions, winning medals in the African Road Championships and competing in the 2023 Africa Games. Houili competed in 2023 at the professional level, entering events such as the Princess Anna Vasa Tour and the Giore della Toscana.

Houili was selected to represent Algeria in the road race at the 2024 Summer Olympics. She participated, but failed to finish.

== Major results ==
2021
National Junior Road Championships

1st Road race
1st Time trial

African Junior Road Championships

3rd Road race
3rd Time trial

2022
African Road Championships

1st Time trial
4th Road race

National Road Championships

1st Road race
1st Under-23 time trial

10th Road race, Mediterranean Games
4th Arab Road Cycling Championships Road race
2023
1st Time trial, African Under-23 Road Championships
Arab Games

1st Time trial
1st Team time trial
4th Road race

Arab Road Championships

1st Time trial
1st Team time trial
2nd Road race

National Road Championships

4th Time trial
5th Road race

2024
National Road Championships

1st Time trial
3rd Road race

2nd International Alanya Castle Criterium
African Games

1st Under-23 road race
2nd Under-23 time trial
5th Road race
7th Time trial

2025
3rd Tour of Bostonliq Ladies
National Road Championships

1st Time trial
1st Road race

African Road Championships

1st Under-23 Time trial
3rd Mixed-relay time trial

2026
National Road Championships

1st Time trial
1st Road race
