= Youcef Reguigui =

Algerian cyclist (born 1990)

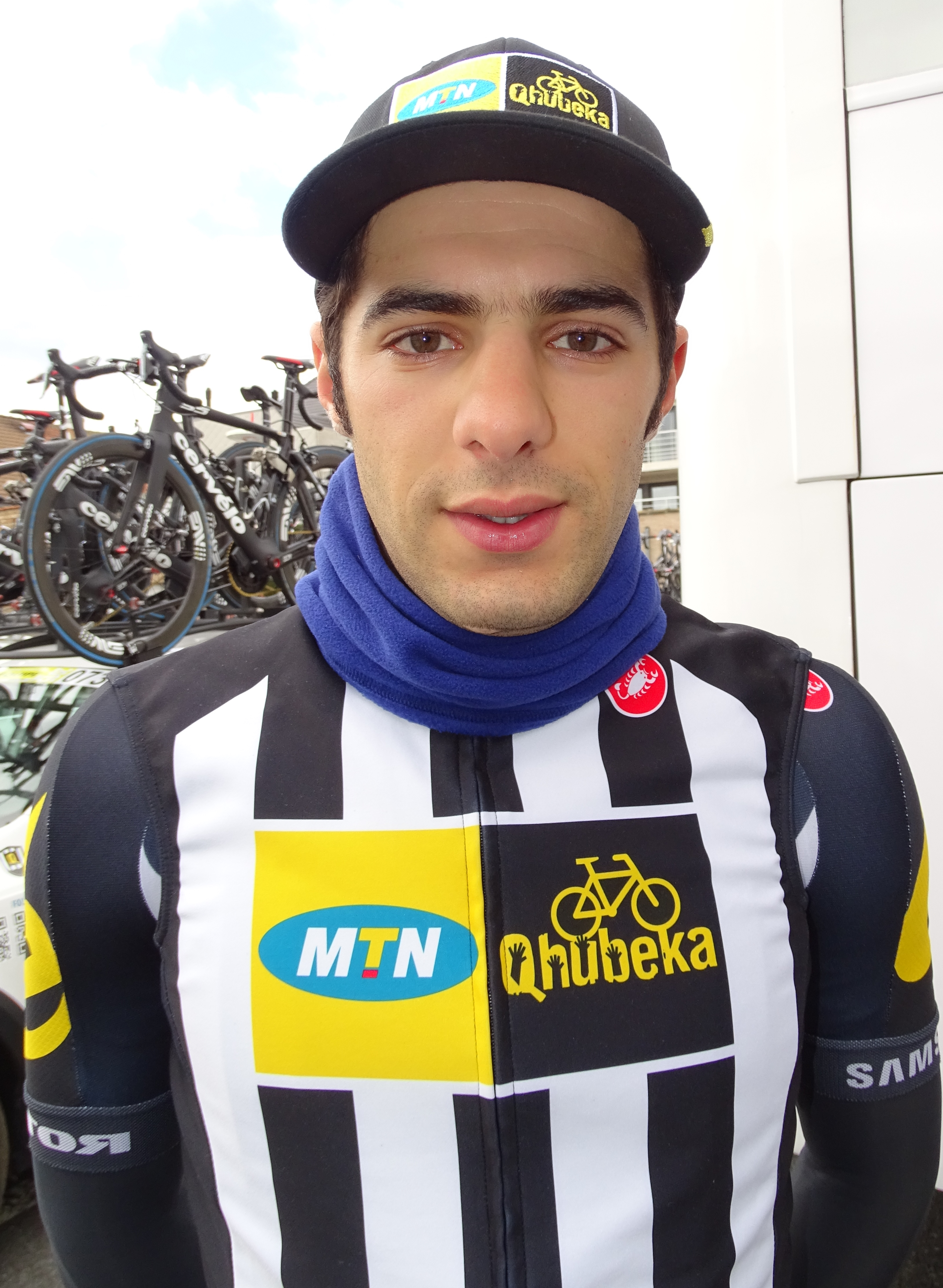
- Reguigui in 2015.

Personal information
- Full name: Youcef Reguigui
- Born: 9 January 1990 (age 36) Algiers, Algeria
- Height: 172 cm (5 ft 8 in)
- Weight: 69 kg (152 lb)

Cycling career
- Sport: Cycling
- Current team: Madar Pro Cycling Team
- Discipline: Road
- Role: Rider

Amateur team
- 2009–2010: World Cycling Centre

Professional teams
- 2011–2012: Groupement Sportif Pétrolier Algérie
- 2013–2017: MTN–Qhubeka
- 2018: Sovac–Natura4Ever
- 2019–2024: Terengganu Inc. TSG
- 2025–: Madar Pro Cycling Team

Major wins
- One-day races and Classics National Road Race Championships (2011,2017,2018) National Time Trial Championships (2019, 2020) African Games Road Race (2019) Races stage Tour de Langkawi (2015) Tour d'Azerbaïdjan (2012)

Youcef Reguigui (born 9 January 1990) is an Algerian road racing cyclist, who currently rides for UCI Continental team Madar Pro Cycling Team.

He began his professional career with the African MTN–Qhubeka team in 2013. His first professional win came in 2014 at the 2.1-ranked Tour d'Azerbaïdjan. The following year, he won his second professional victory at the summit finish of Fraser's Hill in the 2015 Tour de Langkawi. He was named in the start list for the 2015 Vuelta a España.

== Major results ==
2011
1st Road race, National Road Championships
1st Road race, National Under-23 Road Championships
1st Stage 7 Tour du Faso
Challenge du Prince

2nd Trophée de la Maison Royale
3rd Trophée de l'Anniversaire

3rd Road race, Pan Arab Games
3rd ZLM Tour
5th Road race, African Road Championships
7th Overall Tour d'Algérie

1st Stage 3

2012
1st Overall Tour d'Azerbaïdjan
1st Stage 2 Toscana-Terra di Ciclismo
3rd Road race, National Road Championships
8th La Côte Picarde
2013
1st Road race, Arab Road Championships
2nd Overall Sharjah International Cycling Tour

1st Stage 4

2014
1st Stage 2 Tour de Chlef
1st Stage 3 Tour d'Azerbaïdjan
2015
1st Overall Tour de Langkawi

1st Stage 7

2016
2nd Road race, African Road Championships
7th Trofeo Playa de Palma
2017
National Road Championships

1st Road race
2nd Time trial

1st Overall Tour de Blida
2018
1st Road race, National Road Championships
Tour du Sénégal

1st Points classification
1st Stages 2, 3 & 4

Tour International des Zibans

1st Stages 2 & 4

African Road Championships

3rd Team time trial
8th Road race

4th Overall Grand Prix International de la ville d'Alger

1st Stage 2

5th Overall Tour d'Algérie

1st Points classification
1st Stages 4, 5 & 7

7th Overall La Tropicale Amissa Bongo
7th Grand Prix de la Pharmacie Centrale
10th Overall Tour de la Pharmacie Centrale

1st Stage 1

2019
1st Road race, African Games
National Road Championships

1st Time trial
4th Road race

Challenge du Prince

1st Trophée de l'Anniversaire
1st Trophée de la Maison Royale
4th Trophée Princier

1st Points classification Tour of China II
3rd Road race, African Road Championships
3rd Overall Tour de Kumano
3rd Overall Tour of Iran (Azerbaijan)

1st Stage 2

4th Overall Tour de Korea

1st Points classification

4th Overall La Tropicale Amissa Bongo
2020
National Road Championships

1st Time trial
4th Road race

4th Overall La Tropicale Amissa Bongo

1st Stage 5

4th Overall Tour of Saudi Arabia
6th Overall Tour de Taiwan
2021
African Road Championships

3rd Road race
3rd Team time trial

6th Grand Prix Gazipaşa
7th GP Manavgat
2022
2nd Road race, Islamic Solidarity Games
6th Grand Prix Develi
7th Grand Prix Erciyes
10th Road race, Mediterranean Games
2023
National Road Championships

1st Time trial
4th Road race

Tour d'Algérie

1st Stages 3, 9 & 10

1st Grand Prix de la Ville d'Alger
1st Courts Mammouth Classique de l'île Maurice
1st Grand Prix de la Famille Royale
2nd Grand Prix du Trône
Arab Games

3rd Road race
8th Time trial

6th Overall Tour of Sakarya
9th Overall Tour de Maurice
2024
2nd Courts Mammouth Classique de l'Île Maurice
8th Overall Tour d'Algérie

1st Stages 2 & 4

9th Grand Prix de la Ville d'Annaba
2025
1st Stage 2 Tour de Ghardaia
3rd Overall Tour d'Algérie

1st Mountains classification
1st Stage 9

3rd Grand Prix de la Ville d'Alger
3rd Grand Prix Sonatrach
8th Overall Baltic Chain Tour

=== Grand Tour general classification results timeline ===
Grand Tour	2015	2016	2017
Giro d'Italia	—	—	—
Tour de France	—	—	—
Vuelta a España	134	—	DNF

Legend
—	Did not compete
DNF	Did not finish
