= Abdelmalek Madani =

Algerian bicycle racer

Personal information
- Full name: Abdelmalek Madani
- Born: 28 February 1983 (age 43)

Cycling career
- Sport: Cycling
- Current team: Retired
- Discipline: Road
- Role: Rider

Amateur team
- 2016–2017: Groupement Sportif des Pétroliers d'Algérie

Professional teams
- 2009: Doha Team
- 2011–2015: Groupement Sportif Pétrolier Algérie

Abdelmalek Madani (born 28 February 1983) is an Algerian former professional cyclist.

== Major results ==
2008
2nd Time trial, National Road Championships
3rd Road race, African Road Championships
5th Grand Prix de la ville de Tunis
2009
National Road Championships

1st Time trial
2nd Road race

Tour de Tipaza

1st Stages 1 & 2

3rd Overall Perlis Open
4th Emirates Cup
2010
1st Time trial, National Road Championships
8th Time trial, African Road Championships
2011
1st Stage 3 Tour du Faso
Challenge du Prince

3rd Trophée Princier
6th Trophée de l'Anniversaire

6th Challenge Khouribga, Challenge des phosphates
2012
2nd Road race, National Road Championships
Challenge du Prince

2nd Trophée Princier
9th Trophée de l'Anniversaire

2013
1st Team time trial, Arab Road Championships (with Azzedine Lagab, Youcef Reguigui and Faysal Hamza)
2nd Team time trial, African Road Championships
2nd Road race, National Road Championships
9th Overall Tour de Blida
2014
National Road Championships

2nd Time trial
3rd Road race

2015
2nd Road race, National Road Championships
2nd Overall Tour de Constantine

1st Stage 1

7th Overall Tour International de Sétif
2016
9th Overall Tour d'Annaba
