= Hamza Mansouri =

Algerian cyclist

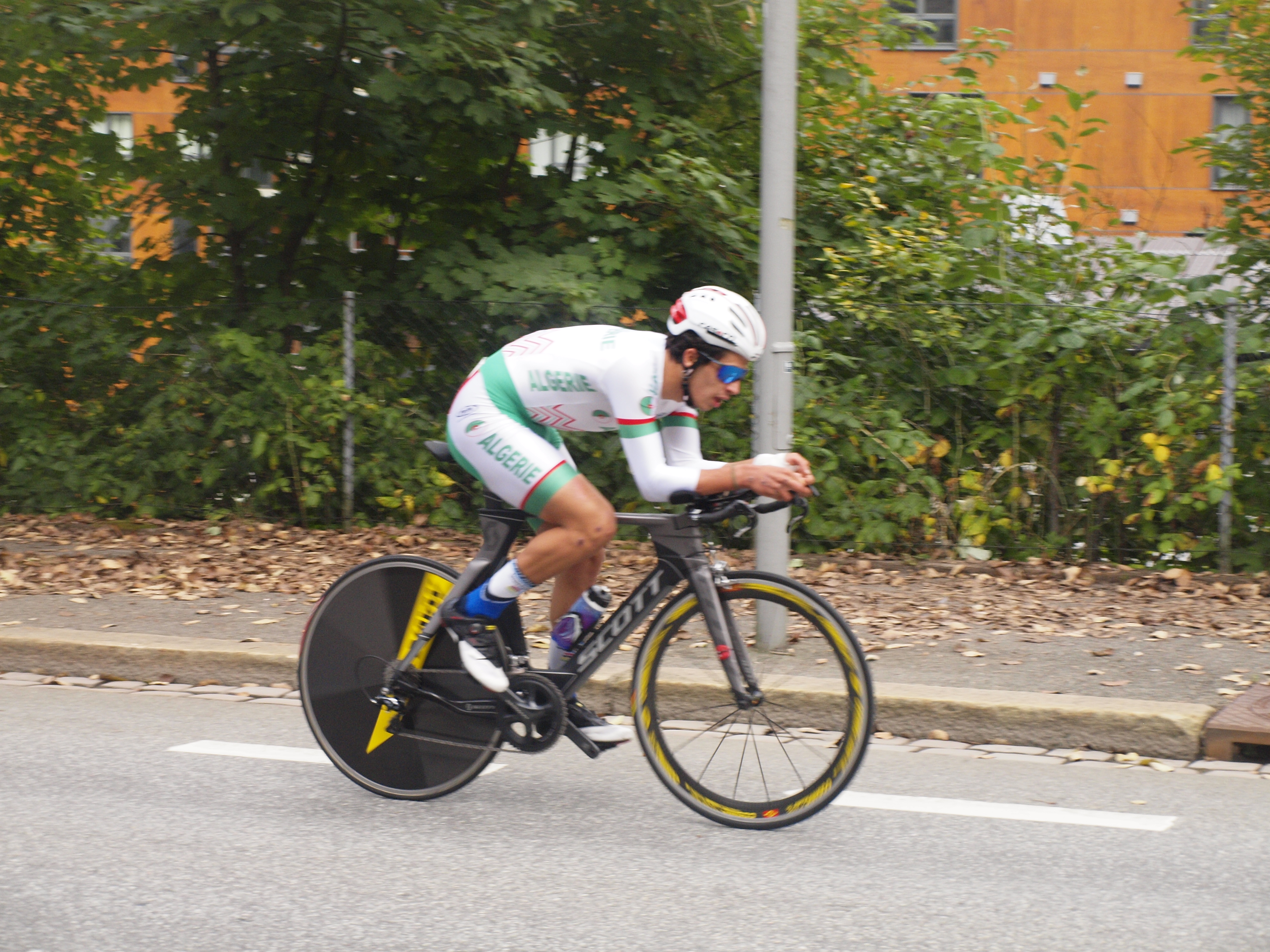
- Mansouri in 2017

Personal information
- Born: 13 April 1999 (age 27)

Cycling career
- Sport: Cycling
- Current team: Madar Pro Cycling Team
- Discipline: Road
- Role: Rider

Amateur teams
- 2017: World Cycling Centre
- 2020: Sovac Algérie
- 2021–2022: Mouloudia Club d'Alger

Professional teams
- 2018–2019: Sovac–Natura4Ever
- 2024–: Madar Pro Cycling Team

Hamza Mansouri (born 13 April 1999) is an Algerian cyclist, who currently rides for UCI Continental team Madar Pro Cycling Team. He competed in the men's road race event at the 2020 Summer Olympics. His brother Islam is also a cyclist.

== Major results ==
2016
African Junior Road Championships

1st Road race
3rd Time trial

National Junior Road Championships

1st Road race
1st Time trial

2017
African Junior Road Championships

1st Road race
1st Time trial
1st Team time trial

1st Time trial, Arab Junior Road Championships
1st Arab Under-23 XCO Championships
African Junior Track Championships

2nd Omnium
3rd Sprint
3rd Keirin

2018
1st Time trial, National Under-23 Road Championships
1st Overall Tour des Aéroports

1st Stage 6

2nd Time trial, National Road Championships
2019
1st Time trial, National Under-23 Road Championships
4th Time trial, National Road Championships
8th Overall Tour du Faso

1st Stage 8

2021
1st Time trial, National Under-23 Road Championships
2nd Time trial, National Road Championships
African Road Championships

3rd Team time trial
4th Time trial

8th Overall Tour du Faso
2022
National Road Championships

2nd Time trial
4th Road race

African Road Championships

3rd Team time trial
9th Time trial

9th Time trial, Mediterranean Games
2023
1st Team time trial, African Road Championships
2024
1st Stage 1 (ITT) Tour International des Zibans
1st Stage 2 Tour de Tlemcen
2nd Time trial, National Road Championships
2025
National Road Championships

2nd Road race
3rd Time trial

2nd Overall Tour National de Sidi bel Abbes

1st Stage 2

7th Overall Tour of Bostonliq
