= Abderrahmane Hamza =

Algerian cyclist

Personal information
- Full name: Abderrahmane Mehdi Hamza
- Born: 19 February 1992 (age 34) Algeria

Cycling career
- Sport: Cycling
- Discipline: Road
- Role: Rider

Amateur team
- 2016–2017: Groupement Sportif des Pétroliers d'Algérie

Professional teams
- 2012–2015: Vélo Club Sovac Algérie
- 2015: Groupement Sportif des Pétroliers d'Algérie
- 2018–2019: Sovac–Natura4Ever

Abderrahmane Mehdi Hamza (born 19 February 1992) is an Algerian racing cyclist, who last rode for UCI Continental team Sovac Algérie. He rode at the 2013 UCI Road World Championships.

== Major results ==
2014
10th Circuit d'Alger
2015
4th Overall Tour Internationale d'Oranie
2016
2nd Overall Tour du Sénégal

1st Stage 3

7th Circuit de Constantine
2017
3rd Road race, National Road Championships
2018
1st Stage 1 Tour d'Algérie
2nd Overall Tour du Sénégal
2nd Grand Prix de la Pharmacie Centrale
10th Overall Tour International de la Wilaya d'Oran
