= Nassim Saidi =

Algerian cyclist (born 1994)

Personal information
- Born: 9 December 1994 (age 31) Algiers, Algeria

Cycling career
- Sport: Cycling
- Current team: Madar Pro Cycling Team
- Discipline: Road
- Role: Rider

Amateur teams
- 2015: AS Sûreté nationale
- 2015: Tours Agglo 37
- 2016: Touraine Cycliste 37
- 2016–2018: AS Sûreté nationale
- 2020: Vélo Club Sovac
- 2021: Mouloudia Club d'Alger
- 2022–2023: Dubai Police

Professional teams
- 2013–2014: Olympique Team Algerie-Tour Aglo37
- 2016: Al Marakeb Cycling Team
- 2019: Sovac Algérie
- 2024–: Madar Pro Cycling Team

Nassim Saidi (born 9 December 1994) is an Algerian cyclist, who currently rides for UCI Continental team Madar Pro Cycling Team.

== Major results ==
2015
2nd Team time trial, African Games
3rd Time trial, National Road Championships
3rd Critérium International de Blida
9th Road race, African Under-23 Road Championships
2016
1st Critérium International de Blida
2nd Team time trial, African Road Championships
National Road Championships

2nd Road race
4th Time trial

4th Critérium International d'Alger
4th Circuit d'Alger
8th Overall Tour du Faso

1st Stage 8

8th Overall Tour d'Annaba
10th Overall Tour Internationale d'Oranie
2019
3rd Road race, African Games
5th Overall Tour d'Egypte

1st Points classification
1st Stage 2

6th Overall Tour of Mevlana
8th Trophée de l'Anniversaire, Challenge du Prince
2020
9th Grand Prix Manavgat–Side
2021
African Road Championships

2nd Road race
3rd Team time trial

2nd Time trial, National Road Championships
9th Grand Prix Velo Manavgat
2022
1st Road race, Arab Road Championships
3rd Grand Prix Tomarza
4th Road race, African Road Championships
2023
African Road Championships
1st Team time trial

4th Road race

1st Stage 6 Tour d'Algérie
Arab Road Championships

3rd Road race
3rd Time trial

8th Overall Tour of Sharjah

1st Points classification

2024
1st Overall Tour d'Algérie
1st Grand Prix de la Ville d'Oran
