= Fayçal Hamza =

Algerian cyclist

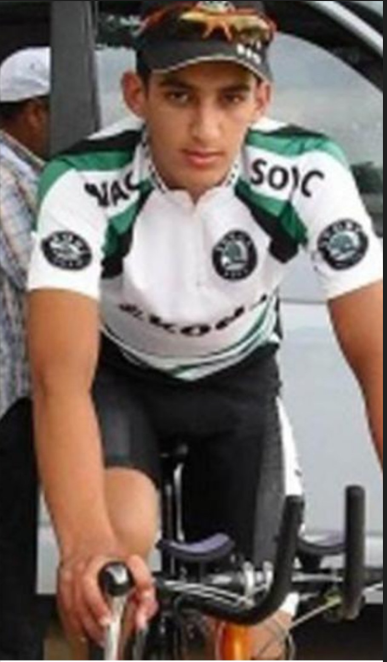

Personal information
- Born: 6 September 1992 (age 34) Algeria

Cycling career
- Sport: Cycling
- Discipline: Road
- Role: Rider

Amateur teams
- 2016: Vélo Club Sovac
- 2017: Groupement Sportif des Pétroliers d'Algérie
- 2019: Nadi Riadhi Dely Ibrahim
- 2020: Chabiba Eriadi Draria
- 2022–2023: Nadi Riadhi Dely Ibrahim

Professional team
- 2012–2015: Vélo Club Sovac Algérie

Fayçal Hamza (born 6 September 1992) is an Algerian racing cyclist. He rode at the 2013 UCI Road World Championships.

== Major results ==
2011
3rd Time trial, National Road Championships
6th Time trial, All-Africa Games
10th Time trial, African Road Championships
2012
1st Stage 8 Tour du Faso
3rd Team time trial, African Road Championships
2014
8th Critérium International de Sétif
2015
2nd Grand Prix d'Oran
2016
3rd Road race, National Road Championships
2022
5th Time trial, National Road Championships
2023
5th Time trial, National Road Championships
