= Yacine Hamza =

Algerian cyclist (born 1997)

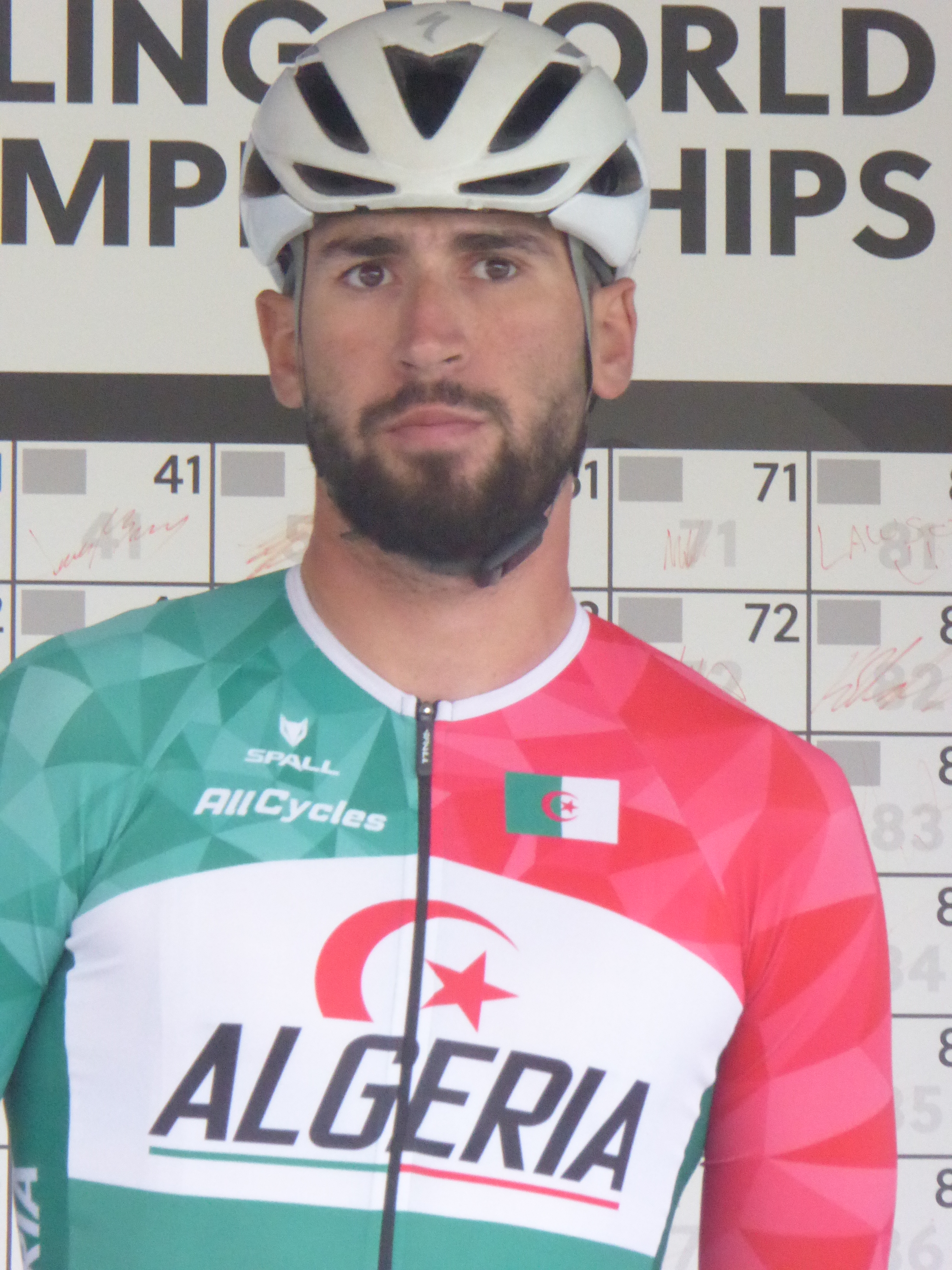
- Hamza at the 2023 World Championships

Personal information
- Born: 18 April 1997 (age 29) El Biar, Algeria

Cycling career
- Sport: Cycling
- Current team: Madar Pro Cycling Team
- Discipline: Road
- Role: Rider

Amateur teams
- 2016–2017: Groupement Sportif des Pétroliers d'Algérie
- 2017: Peloton Tenerife
- 2018: Telco.m Ederlan Frenkit
- 2019: ULB Sports–Natural Greatness
- 2021: Groupement Sportif des Pétroliers d'Algérie
- 2022–2023: Dubai Police Team

Professional teams
- 2018: Groupement Sportif des Pétroliers d'Algérie
- 2019: VIB Sports
- 2020: Groupement Sportif des Pétroliers
- 2024–: Madar Pro Cycling Team

Yacine Hamza (Arabic: ياسين حمزة; born 18 April 1997) is an Algerian cyclist, who currently rides for UCI Continental team Madar Pro Cycling Team.

== Major results ==
2015
1st Road race, Arab Junior Road Championships
2016
5th Critérium International de Sétif
7th Overall Tour International de Constantine

1st Young rider classification

2017
1st Road race, National Under-23 Road Championships
1st Team time trial, Arab Road Championships
1st Stages 2 & 4 Tour d'Algérie
2nd Overall Grand Prix International de la ville d'Alger

1st Stage 4

2018
1st Road race, National Under-23 Road Championships
1st Stage 4 Tour International de la Wilaya d'Oran
2nd Road race, Arab Road Championships
2nd Road race, National Road Championships
6th Overall Tour d'Algérie

1st Young rider classification
1st Stage 2

7th Overall Grand Prix International de la ville d'Alger

1st Young rider classification
1st Stage 3

2019
1st Overall Tour des Aéroports

1st Stages 1 & 2

1st Stage 4 Grand Prix Chantal Biya
2nd Road race, African Under-23 Road Championships
3rd Road race, Arab Road Championships
5th Road race, African Games
7th Road race, African Road Championships
Challenge du Prince

8th Trophée Princier
10th Trophée de la Maison Royale

10th Overall Tour of Kayseri
2020
3rd Grand Prix Manavgat–Side
2021
Tour du Faso

1st Points classification
1st Stage 6

1st Stage 4 Tour of Mevlana
3rd Time trial, National Road Championships
2022
1st Grand Prix Tomarza
3rd Grand Prix Develi
4th Time trial, National Road Championships
6th Grand Prix Justiniano Hotels
2023
1st Overall Grand Prix Chantal Biya

1st Points classification
1st Stages 2 & 4

1st Road race, Arab Games
Arab Road Championships

1st Road race
3rd Team time trial

Tour d'Algérie

1st Points classification
1st Stages 2, 4, 7 & 8

Tour of Salalah

1st Points classification
1st Stages 1 & 4

1st Stage 2 Tour of Sharjah
2nd Road race, African Road Championships
2nd Overall Tour du Bénin

1st Stages 2, 3 & 5

3rd Road race, National Road Championships
7th Overall Tour du Cameroun

1st Points classification
1st Stages 1, 2 & 7

8th Grand Prix Kültepe
2024
1st Overall Tour de Tlemcen

1st Stage 1

1st Nad Al Sheba Sports Tournament
Tour d'Algérie

1st Points classification
1st Stages 1, 6, 8 & 9

1st Stages 1 & 4 Tour of Salalah
2nd Overall Grand Prix Chantal Biya

1st Mountains classification
1st Stage 1

2nd Grand Prix de la ville de Nogent-sur-Oise
2nd Grand Prix d'Ongola
4th Grand Prix de la Ville d'Alger
10th Overall Tour du Bénin

1st Stage 4

10th Grand Prix de la Ville d'Annaba
2025
National Road Championships

1st Road race
5th Time trial

1st Grand Prix de la Ville d'Alger
1st Nad Al Sheba Sports Tournament
1st Daman Ramadan Night Race
1st Stage 1 Tour de Kurpie
2nd Overall Tour de Ghardaia
2nd Grand Prix Sakiat Sidi Youcef
2nd Grand Prix Sonatrach
3rd Overall Tour d'Aïn Defla

1st Stage 2

4th Overall Tour d'Algérie

1st Points classification
1st Stages 1, 2, 3, 4, 5,7 & 10
