= International Syrian Tour =

Syrian multi-day road cycling race

Race details
- Date: October
- Region: Syria
- Local name(s): الجولة السورية الدولية (in Arabic)
- Discipline: Road
- Competition: UCI Asia Tour (2022–present)
- Type: Stage race
- Organiser: Syrian Arab Cycling Federation

History
- First edition: 2022
- Editions: 1 (as of 2022)
- First winner: Hamza Amari (ALG)
- Most wins: No repeat winners
- Most recent: Hamza Amari (ALG)

The International Syrian Tour, is a men's stage cycle race which takes place in Syria and is rated by the UCI as 2.2 since 2022. It is part of the UCI Asia Tour. Professional road cycling competitions were resumed in Syria after eleven-years hiatus.

The first edition was in 2022, from 4 October to 8 October, and lasted for four days. The tour routes commences from Qardaha and it passes through Tartus and Jableh, and then it finishes at Latakia.

== Winners ==
Year	Country	Rider	Team
2022	Algeria	Hamza Amari	Algeria national

=== Wins per country ===
Wins	Country
1	Algeria
