= Islam Mansouri =

Algerian cyclist

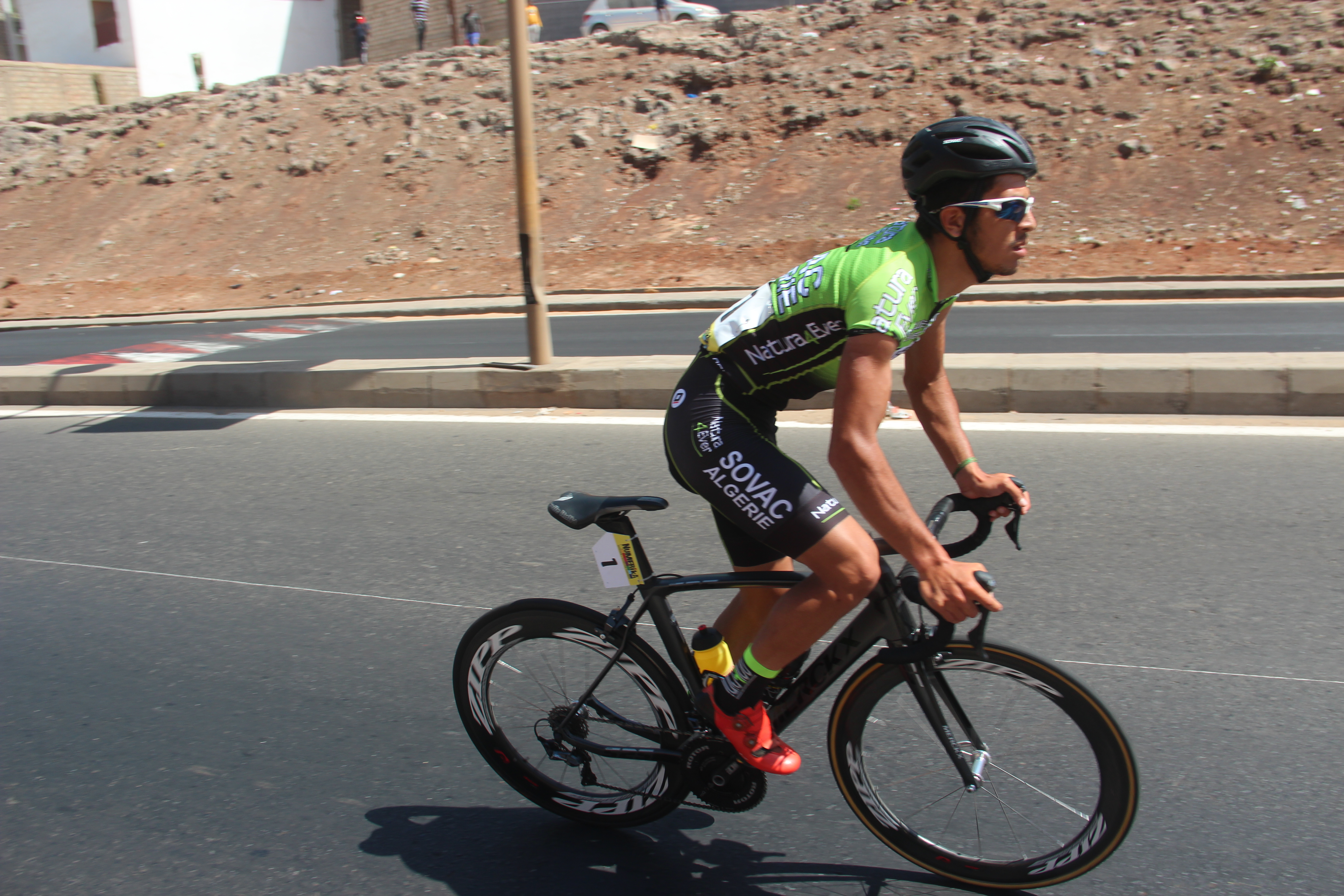
- 8th stage of the Tour du Sénégal 2018

Personal information
- Born: 23 July 1997 (age 29)

Cycling career
- Sport: Cycling
- Current team: Madar Pro Cycling Team
- Discipline: Road
- Role: Rider

Amateur teams
- 2016: Ooredoo
- 2021–2022: Mouloudia Club d'Alger

Professional teams
- 2017: Vélo Club Sovac
- 2018–2020: Sovac–Natura4Ever
- 2024–: Madar Pro Cycling Team

Islam Mansouri (born 23 July 1997) is an Algerian cyclist, who currently rides for UCI Continental team Madar Pro Cycling Team. His brother Hamza is also a professional road cyclist.

== Major results ==
2014
Arab Junior Road Championships

1st Time trial
1st Team time trial

National Junior Road Championships

1st Road race
2nd Time trial

2015
1st Road race, National Junior Road Championships
African Junior Road Championships

2nd Road race
2nd Time trial

3rd Time trial, Arab Junior Road Championships
2016
9th Critérium International de Sétif
2017
1st Team time trial, Arab Road Championships (with Abderrahmane Mansouri, Azzedine Lagab & Abdellah Ben Youcef)
National Under-23 Road Championships

1st Time trial
5th Road race

1st Overall Tour du Sénégal

1st Young rider classification
1st Stage 2

1st Stage 1 Tour d'Algérie
1st Stage 5 Tour de Tunisie
1st Stage 3 Grand Prix International de la ville d'Alger
7th Road race, African Road Championships
2018
1st Stage 8 Tour du Sénégal
3rd Team time trial, African Road Championships
4th Road race, National Road Championships
2019
2nd Time trial, National Under-23 Road Championships
3rd Time trial, African Under-23 Road Championships
8th Overall Tour d'Egypte

1st Young rider classification

2022
1st Road race, National Road Championships
1st Grand Prix d'Ongola
African Road Championships

3rd Team time trial
10th Road race

5th Road race, Arab Road Championships
5th Overall Grand Prix Chantal Biya

1st Stage 1

2023
1st Overall GP El Malah
2024
3rd Overall Tour de Tlemcen

1st Stage 4

7th Overall Grand Prix Chantal Biya

1st Points classification
1st Stages 3 & 4

2025
1st Overall Tour du Cameroun

1st Stage 6

1st Overall Tour de Ghardaia

1st Stages 1 & 4 (ITT)

2nd Time trial, National Road Championships
9th Overall Tour d'Algérie
