= Hamza Amari =

Algerian cyclist

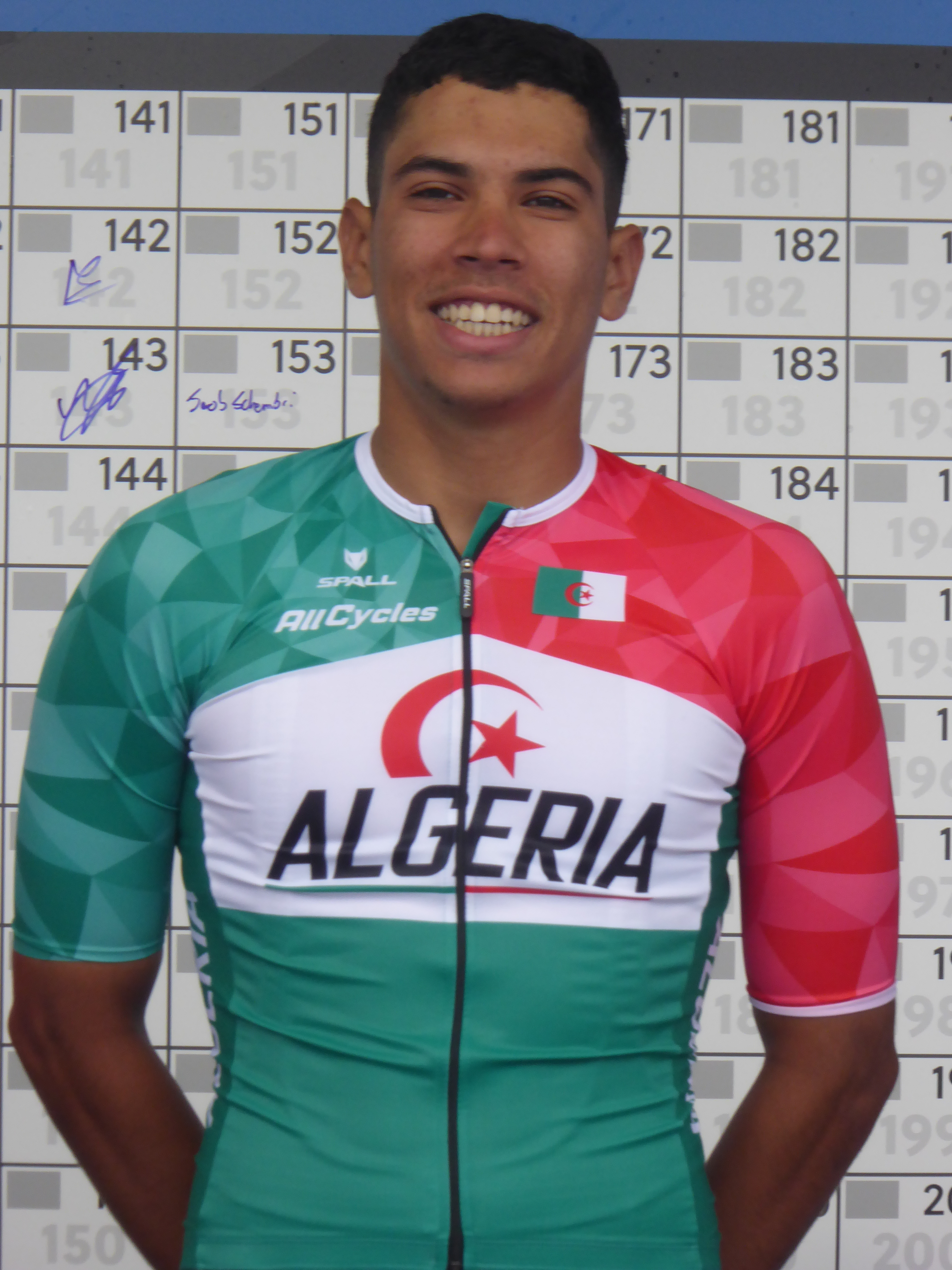
- Amari in 2023

Personal information
- Born: 2 October 2002 (age 24)

Cycling career
- Sport: Cycling
- Current team: Madar Pro Cycling Team
- Discipline: Road
- Role: Rider

Amateur teams
- 2021: Groupement Sportif des Pétroliers
- 2022: Dubai Police Team

Professional teams
- 2023: Q36.5 Continental Team
- 2024–: Madar Pro Cycling Team

Hamza Amari (born 2 October 2002) is an Algerian cyclist, who currently rides for UCI Continental team Madar Pro Cycling Team.

== Major results ==
2019
1st Stages 3 & 4 Tour du Sahel
3rd Road race, National Junior Road Championships
2021
1st Stage 2 Classique Tipaza
2022
1st Time trial, National Under-23 Road Championships
1st Overall International Syrian Tour

1st Stage 1

1st Overall Tour de Gardaia

1st Stage 3

1st Overall GP Ville de Oran

1st Stage 1

3rd Road race, African Road Championships
6th Overall Tour d'Algérie
6th Road race, Arab Road Championships
2023
1st Team time trial, African Road Championships
National Road Championships

2nd Time trial
5th Road race

2nd Overall La Tropicale Amissa Bongo

1st Young rider classification

Arab Road Championships

2nd Road race
5th Time trial

Arab Games

2nd Team time trial
4th Time trial
6th Road race

3rd Time trial, African Under-23 Road Championships
5th Grand Prix de la Ville d'Alger
5th Grand Prix du Trône
2024
1st Grand Prix de la Ville d'Alger
1st Stage 2 Tour du Bénin
1st Stage 4 Tour National de Sidi bel Abbes
2nd Time trial, National Under-23 Road Championships
3rd Road race, National Road Championships
4th Grand Prix d'Ongola
10th Overall Grand Prix Chantal Biya

1st Young rider classification

2025
1st Overall Tour d'Algérie
1st MyWhoosh Ramadan Cycling Championship
3rd Road race, National Road Championships
3rd Overall Tour de Ghardaia

1st Stage 3

4th Grand Prix Sonatrach
6th Grand Prix Edebiyat Yolu
