= Algerian National Road Race Championships =

National road cycling championship in Algeria

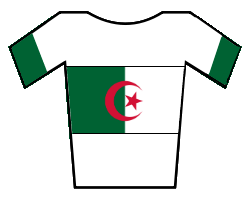
The champion's jersey

The Algerian National Road Race Championships is a cycling race where the Algerian cyclists decide who will become the champion for the year to come.

== Multiple winners ==
Men

Wins	Name	Years
5	Cherif Merabet	2003, 2004, 2005, 2006, 2007
5	Azzedine Lagab	2009, 2010, 2012, 2021, 2024
3	Ahmed Kebaïli	1948, 1950, 1951
3	Youcef Reguigui	2011, 2017, 2018
2	Abderrahmane Mansouri	2015, 2016

== Men ==
Algerian National Road Race Championships Championships – Men's elite race
Race details
- Region: Algeria
- Discipline: Road bicycle racing
- Type: One-day

History
- First edition: 1948
- First winner: Ahmed Kebaïli
- Most wins: Cherif Merabet (5 wins)
- Most recent: Azzedine Lagab

=== Elite ===
Year	Gold	Silver	Bronze
1948	Ahmed Kebaïli		
1950	Ahmed Kebaïli		
1951	Ahmed Kebaïli		
1981	Malek Hamza	Ahmed Zaaf	A. Waheb Demerdji
1982	Nieddline Tchambaz	Malek Hamza	A. Guerroudj
1983	Moussa Bessa	Hamid Chibane	Nieddline Tchambaz
1984	Mohamed Belabid	Hamid Chibane	Ahmed Zaaf
1985	Salim Belksir	Irbeh Sebti Benzine	Madjid Ghoumarassi
1986	Irbeh Sebti Benzine	Malek Hamza	Karim Mpora Gherabiouh
1987	Madjid Ghoumarassi	Mohamed Mir	Abdelkader Reguigui
1998	Hicham Menad	Omar Slimane Zitoune	Billal Derbal
1999	Hakim Hamza	Redouane Hamza	Khelil Haddad
2000	Fares Allik	Omar Slimane Zitoune	Fethi Medjami
2001	Redouane Salah	Azzedine Madani	Mourad Mezned
2003	Cherif Merabet		
2004	Cherif Merabet		
2005	Cherif Merabet		
2006	Cherif Merabet		
2007	Cherif Merabet	Rostom Slimane Zitoune	Omar Slimane Zitoune
2008	Redouane Chabaane	Azzedine Lagab	Cherif Merabet
2009	Azzedine Lagab	Abdelmalek Madani	Karim Charif
2010	Azzedine Lagab	Hichem Chaabane	Ismail Lalouchi
2011	Youcef Reguigui	Azzedine Lagab	Abdellah Ben Youcef
2012	Azzedine Lagab	Abdelmalek Madani	Youcef Reguigui
2013	Hichem Chaabane	Abdelmalek Madani	Mouadh Betira
2014	Abdelbasset Hannachi	Azzedine Lagab	Abdelmalek Madani
2015	Abderrahmane Mansouri	Abdelmalek Madani	Hichem Mokhtari
2016	Abderrahmane Mansouri	Nassim Saidi	Fayçal Hamza
2017	Youcef Reguigui	Azzedine Lagab	Abderrahmane Mehdi Hamza
2018	Youcef Reguigui	Yacine Hamza	Oussama Mansouri
2019	Abderrahmane Bouchlaghem	Mohamed Bouzidi	Abderrahmane Mansouri
2021	Azzedine Lagab	Khacib El Sassane	Abderrahmane Mansouri
2022	Islam Mansouri	Sif Eddine Yebka	Abdalla Benyoucef
2023	Abdelraouf Bengayou	Oussama Cheblaoui	Yacine Hamza
2024	Azzedine Lagab	Ayoub Ferkous	Hamza Amari
2025	Yacine Hamza	Hamza Mansouri	Hamza Amari

=== U23 ===
Year	Gold	Silver	Bronze
2010	Hichem Chaabane	Ismail Lallouchi	Mourad Faid
2011	Youcef Reguigui	Billel Saâda	Khaled Abdenbi
2012	Mouadh Betira	Adil Barbari	Mohamed Bouzidi
2013	Mouadh Betira	Adil Barbari	Mohamed Bouzidi
2014	Adil Barbari		
2015	Abderrahmane Mansouri	Hichem Mokhtari	Ayoub Karrar
2017	Yacine Hamza	Abderrahmane Mansouri	Zineddine Karar

=== Junior ===
Algerian National Road Race Championships Championships – Men's junior race
Race details
- Region: Algeria
- Discipline: Road bicycle racing
- Type: One-day

History
- First edition: 1942
- First winner: Marcel Velasco
- Most wins: Salim Belksir, Abderrahmane Mansouri, Islam Mansouri, Aymen Merdj (2 wins each)
- Most recent: Mohamed Abderahmane Ksir

Year	Gold	Silver	Bronze
1942	Marcel Velasco		
1981	Salim Belksir	Zoubir Lagab	Abdelkrim Chikha
1982	Salim Belksir	Zoubir Lagab	Abdelkrim Chikha
1983	Karim Chekaoui	Karim Mpora Gherabiouh	Kamel Mekaout
1984	Mourad Beladjila	Telailia	Ali Dribine
1985	Samir Ladjimi	Miloud Saddouki	Mehrez Sayah
1986	Benguerna	Bacha	Mohktari
1987	Z. Bousahla	K. Haddad	Lyes Laadjel
2007	Mohamed Khalfa	Dahmane Al Debi	
2009	Abdelhadi Laddour		
2010	Abdesslam Dahmane	Mahdi Abderrahmane Hamza	Kamel Mohamed Hamza
2011	no race		
2012	Abderrahmane Mansouri	Mustapha Derouache	Zinedine Ahmed
2013	Abderrahmane Mansouri	Zoheir Benyoub	Lyes Charrif
2014	Islam Mansouri	Ibrahim Al Khalil Achouri	Oussama Mansouri
2015	Islam Mansouri	Oussama Mansouri	-
2016	Hamza Mansouri	Abderahmane Amari	Abdelraouf Bengayou
2017	Aymen Merdj	Wali Ibrahim Ogbi	Ayoub Habbou
2018	Aymen Merdj	Mohamed Cherif Noura	Aissa Nadji Lebsir
2019	Ayoub Sahiri	Sadik Benganif	Hamza Amari
2021	Mohamed Abderahmane Ksir	Oussama Khellaf	Ammar Chenegriha

== See also ==
- Algerian National Time Trial Championships
- National Road Cycling Championships
