= Véloce Club Rouen 76 =

French road cycling team

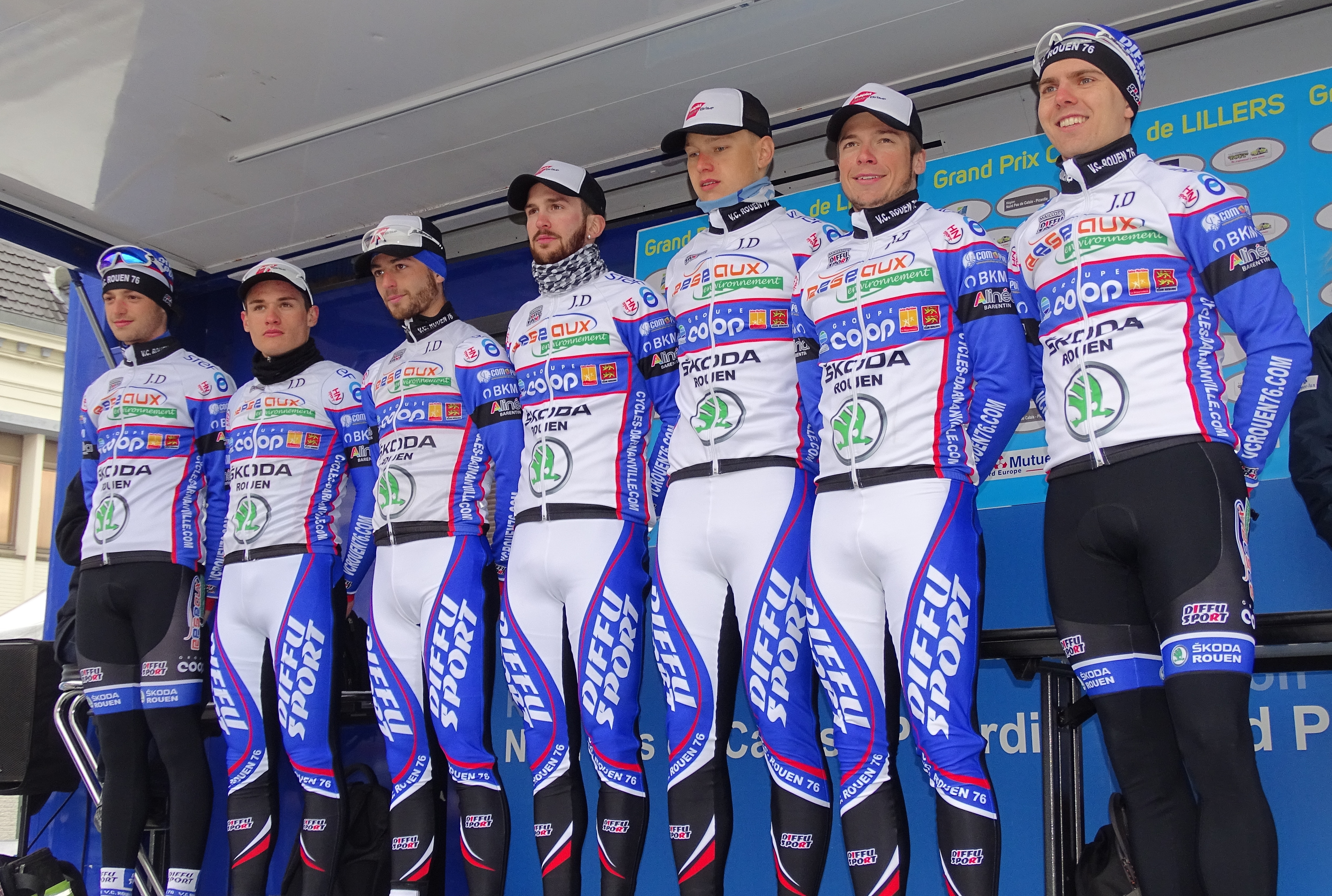
- The team in 2016

Team information
- UCI code: VCR
- Registered: France
- Founded: 1869
- Discipline: Road
- Status: DN1 (–2024); UCI Continental (2025–)
- Bicycles: Colnago

Key personnel
- General manager: Pascal Carlot
- Team managers: Jean-Philippe Yon; Sébastien Havot; Lucas Lebreton

Team name history
- 1869–1999 2000–2024 2025–: VC Rouen; VC Rouen 76; Véloce Club Rouen 76

Véloce Club Rouen 76 is a French UCI Continental road cycling team established in 1869. Until 2025, it was a national first-division (DN1) club team.
