= Sidi Ali–Unlock Team =

Moroccan cycling team

Team information
- UCI code: SPT (2020); SKT (2021); SUT (2022–)
- Registered: Morocco
- Founded: 2020
- Discipline: Road
- Status: UCI Continental

Key personnel
- General manager: Hamza Ait Oufqir
- Team managers: Mohamed Aitoufkir; Mustapha El Amal

Team name history
- 2020; 2021; 2022–: Sidi Ali Pro Cycling; Sidi Ali–Kinetik Sports; Sidi Ali–Unlock Team

Sidi Ali–Unlock Team is a Moroccan professional road bicycle racing team that was founded in 2020.

== Team roster ==
As of 12 March 2024.

Rider	Date of birth
Youssef Bdadou (MAR)	18 June 2000 (age 26)
Mounir El Azhari (MAR)	22 January 1999 (age 27)
Alejandro Gainza (ESP)	11 July 1999 (age 27)
Alessio Gasparini (ITA)	21 October 1998 (age 27)
Hernán Darío Gómez (COL)	26 January 1996 (age 30)
Stepan Grigoryan (ARM)	27 March 1994 (age 32)
Younes Hakim (MAR)	3 February 2004 (age 22)

Rider	Date of birth
Saad Hatifi (MAR)	24 July 2001 (age 25)
Vladimir López (COL)	8 January 1988 (age 38)
Kamal Mahroug (MAR)	26 July 1996 (age 30)
Yin-Chih Wang (TWN)	12 October 1988 (age 37)
Yu-Kuan Wang (TWN)	9 August 1993 (age 33)
Xu He (CHN)	31 October 1997 (age 28)
Nikolaos Zegklis (GRE)	5 July 1996 (age 30)

== Major results ==
Bouskoura Ligue Casablanca Settat, Mounir Al Azhari
Stages 3 & 6 Tour du Cameroun, Nasser Eddine Maatougui

== National Champions ==
Morocco U23 Road Race, Nasser Eddine Maatougui
