= Grand Prix de la Ville d'Alger =

Cycling race in Algeria

Grand Prix International de la ville d'Alger
Race details
- Region: Algiers, Algeria
- Discipline: Road
- Competition: UCI Africa Tour
- Type: One-day race

History
- Editions: 20 (as of 2026)
- Most recent: Yacine Hamza (ALG)

The Grand Prix International de la ville d'Alger is a one-day race held annually in Algeria. It is rated as a category 1.2 event on the UCI Africa Tour. Prior to 2022, it was held as a stage race, and was on the 2018 UCI Africa Tour as a category 2.2 event.

== Winners ==
| Year | Country | Rider | Team |
|---|---|---|---|
| 2017 | Algeria | Abdellah Ben Youcef | Vélo Club Sovac |
| 2018 | Greece | Charalampos Kastrantas | Java Partizan |
| 2019– 2021 | No race | | |
| 2022 | Algeria | Azzedine Lagab | Mouloudia Club Alger |
| 2023 | Algeria | Youcef Reguigui | Terengganu Polygon Cycling Team |
| 2024 | Algeria | Hamza Amari | Madar Pro Cycling Team |
| 2025 | Algeria | Yacine Hamza | Madar Pro Cycling Team |
| 2026 | Algeria | Yacine Hamza | Madar Pro Cycling Team |
