= Algerian National Time Trial Championships =

National road cycling championship in Algeria

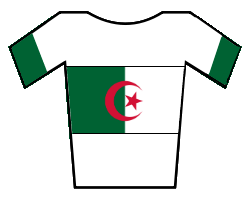
The champion's jersey

The Algerian National Time Trial Championships is a cycling race where the Algerian cyclists decide who will become the champion for the year to come.

== Men ==
Year	Gold	Silver	Bronze
1999	Abdelkadar Rahmani	Khelil Hadad	Zineddine Merabent
2000	Omar Slimane Zeitoune	Hichem Menad	Fares Allik
2001	Omar Slimane Zeitoune	Zineddine Merabent	Brahim El Ouaret
2005	Brahim El Ouaret	Zineddine Merabent	Aziz Boukhari
2007	Redouane Chabaane	Azzedine Lagab	Okkacha Bouanani
2008	Azzedine Lagab	Abdelmalek Madani	Khalil Tamarent
2009	Abdelmalek Madani	Azzedine Lagab	Redouane Chabaane
2010	Abdelmalek Madani	Mourad Faid	Hichem Chaabane
2011	Azzedine Lagab	Khalil Tamarent	Fayçal Hamza
2012	Azzedine Lagab	Hichem Chaabane	Redouane Chabaane
2013	Adil Barbari	Hichem Chaabane	Azzedine Lagab
2014	Azzedine Lagab	Abdelmalek Madani	Hichem Chaabane
2015	Abdelkader Belmokhtar	Adil Barbari	Nassim Saidi
2016	Azzedine Lagab	Adil Barbari	Abderrahmane Mansouri
2017	Islam Mansouri	Azzedine Lagab	Youcef Reguigui
2018	Azzedine Lagab	Hamza Mansouri	Oussama Mansouri
2019	Youcef Reguigui	Azzedine Lagab	Abderrahmane Mansouri
2021	Azzedine Lagab	Hamza Mansouri	Nassim Saidi
2022	Azzedine Lagab	Hamza Amari	Hamza Mansouri
2023	Youcef Reguigui	Mohamed Amine N'Hari	Riyad Gouri
2024	Azzedine Lagab	Hamza Mansouri	Ayoub Sahiri
2025	Azzedine Lagab	Islam Mansouri	Hamza Mansouri

=== U23 ===
Year	Gold	Silver	Bronze
2010	Mourad Faid	Hichem Chaabane	Abdelmalek Kessi
2011	Fayçal Hamza	Billel Saâda	Youcef Reguigui
2012	Fayçal Hamza	Youcef Reguigui	Karim Hadjbouzit
2013	Adil Barbari	Fayçal Hamza	Boualem Belmokhtar
2014	Adil Barbari	Mouadh Bettira	Abdesalam Dahmane
2015	Adil Barbari	Nassim Saidi	Boualem Belmokhtar

=== Junior ===
Year	Gold	Silver	Bronze
2007	Mohamed Khalfa	Nassim Benserai	Djaafar Abdelatif Al Mehdi
2012	Abderrahmane Mansouri	Abderrahmane Bouchlagem	Mustapha Derouache
2013	Abderrahmane Mansouri	Abdelghani Fellah	Salim Keddah
2014	Salim Keddah	Islam Mansouri	Zoheir Benyoub

== See also ==
- Algerian National Road Race Championships
- National Road Cycling Championships
