= UCI race classifications =

The Union Cycliste Internationale (UCI), the world's governing body in the sport of bicycle racing, classifies races according to a rating scale.

The rating is represented by a code made of two or three parts and indicates both the type or style of race (the first part), and its importance or difficulty (the second and third parts, lower being harder). The first part can be an integer or an abbreviation, and the second part, when present, are usually integers. Both parts are separated by a period or decimal point (.).

A higher rated race will result in the successful riders receiving more world ranking points.

== Road racing ==
UCI race classifications are denoted as follows:

The first part of the code denotes whether the race is one-day '1', or a multi-day (stage) race '2'. The second part of the code indicates the race ranking. From highest to lowest these are: '.UWT' (UCI World Tour) or '.WWT' (Women’s World Tour), '.Pro', '.1', and '.2'.

For example, a race rated 1.1 equates to a one-day, category 1 race. A race classification ‘U’ (e.g. 2.2U) denotes an U-23 race and ‘NCup’ (e.g. 1.NCup) a Nations Cup race involving national teams or ‘mixed teams’. While U23 riders are 19-22 years of age, "Juniors" are 17 or 18.

Code	Description	Examples	Participation
1.UWT; 2.UWT	UCI World Tour-races	Tour de France, Tour of Flanders, Paris–Roubaix, Liège–Bastogne–Liège, Tour de Suisse, UAE Tour	UCI WorldTeams (compulsory participation). UCI ProTeams need a wild card In events covered by article 2.15.154: National team of the organising country
1.WWT; 2.WWT	UCI Women's World Tour-races	Strade Bianche Donne, Tour de France Femmes, Paris–Roubaix Femmes, Giro d'Italia Women, Simac Ladies Tour	UCI Women's World Teams (compulsory participation)
1.Pro; 2.Pro	Races part of the UCI ProSeries (men) or UCI ProSeries (women)	Paris–Tours; Kuurne-Brussels-Kuurne; Arctic Race of Norway; Tour de Langkawi; Tour of Slovenia; Deutschland Tour; Vuelta a San Juan Thüringen Ladies Tour	UCI WorldTeams (max 70%); UCI ProTeams; UCI Continental teams (of the country the race is in); National teams (of the country of the organiser); UCI foreign continental teams (max. 2)
1.1; 2.1	One-day race Stage race	Le Samyn; Tour de Taiwan; Tour of Slovakia; Tour of Thailand	UCI WorldTeams (max 50%); UCI ProTeams; UCI continental teams National teams
1.2; 2.2	One-day race Stage race	Paris–Troyes, Tour de Normandie, International Syrian Tour	UCI ProTeams of the country UCI continental teams National teams UCI foreign ProTeams (max. 2); Regional and club teams

== Mountain biking ==
The mountain bike discipline includes the following events comprising the formats listed below:

Code	Description
XC XCO XCM XCP XCC XCE XCT XCR XCS	Cross-country: XC (Chapter II cross-country events) Cross-country Olympic: XCO Cross-country marathon: XCM Cross-country point-to-point: XCP (point to point) Cross-country short circuit: XCC (Short Track) Cross-country eliminator: XCE Cross-country time trial: XCT (Time Trial) Cross-country team relay: XCR (Team Relay) Cross-country stage race: XCS (Stage races)
DH DHI DHM	Downhill: DH (downhill) (Chapter III downhill events) Downhill individual: DHI Downhill marathon: DHM
4X	Four cross: 4X (Chapter IV four cross events)
END	Enduro: END (Chapter IVa enduro events)

== Cyclo-cross ==
All cyclo-cross races are identified by the code 'C'. Again, no decimal point is used in the written form of the classifications.

Code	Meaning
CM	UCI Cyclo-cross World Championships (Championnat Mondial)
CDM	UCI Cyclo-cross World Cup (Coupe du Monde)
CMM	UCI masters cyclo-cross world championships (Championnats du Monde Masters)
CC	Continental Championships (Championnats Continentaux)
C1	Class 1 event
C2	Class 2 event

== Code tables ==
Code	Meaning
JO	Olympic Games (Jeux Olympiques)
JR	Regional Games (Jeux Régionaux)
CM	World Championships (Championnat Mondial)
WT	World Tour
GT	Grand Tour
CDM	World Cup (Coupe du Monde)
PRO	ProSeries (Beyond Category)
CN	National Championships (Championnats Nationaux)
CC	Continental Championships (Championnats Continentaux)
CMM	World Masters Championships (Championnats du Monde Masters)
1	Category 1
2	Category 2
3	Category 3
