= Tour International des Zibans =

Race details
- Date: January
- Region: Biskra, Algeria
- Discipline: Road
- Competition: UCI Africa Tour
- Type: stage race
- Organiser: Algerian Cycling Federation

History
- First edition: 2018
- Editions: 2 (as of 2018)
- First winner: Abdellah Ben Youcef (ALG)
- Most wins: No repeat winners
- Most recent: Abdellah Hida (MAR)

The Tour International des Zibans is a stage cycling race held annually in Algeria since 2018. It is rated 2.2 and is part of UCI Africa Tour.

== Winners ==
Year	Country	Rider	Team
2017	Algeria	Abdellah Ben Youcef	Groupement Sportif des Pétroliers
2018	Morocco	Abdellah Hida	
2019			
2020			
