= Tour du Sénégal =

Race details
- Date: April
- Region: Senegal
- Discipline: Road
- Competition: UCI Africa Tour
- Type: stage race

History
- First edition: 2001
- Editions: 18 (as of 2019)
- First winner: Christophe Lebarbier (FRA)
- Most wins: No repeat winners
- Most recent: Didier Munyaneza (RWA)

The Tour du Sénégal is a stage cycling race held annually in Senegal since 2001. It is rated 2.2 and is part of UCI Africa Tour.

== Winners ==
Year	Country	Rider	Team
2001	France	Christophe Lebarbier	
2002	Latvia	Andris Naudužs	Colombia-Selle Italia
2003	Italy	Leonardo Scarselli	Colombia-Selle Italia
2004	Italy	Mariano Giallorenzo	Colombia-Selle Italia
2005	France	Alexandre Lecocq	
2006	Poland	Łukasz Podolski	
2007	Morocco	Adil Jelloul	
2008	Belgium	Joeri Calleeuw	
2009	France	Stéphane Roger	
2010	Senegal	Massamba Diouf	
2015	Morocco	Zouhair Rahil	
2016	Algeria	Abdellah Benyoucef	Algeria
2017	Algeria	Islam Mansouri	Vélo Club Sovac
2018	Namibia	Dan Craven	Team Embrace The World
2019	Rwanda	Didier Munyaneza	Benediction–Excel Energy
