= List of 2019 UCI Professional Continental and Continental teams =

The Union Cycliste Internationale (UCI) – the governing body of cycling – categorizes teams into three divisions. The first division, consisting of the top 18 teams, are classified as UCI WorldTeams, and compete in the UCI World Tour. The second and third divisions respectively are the Professional Continental teams and the Continental teams.

Teams compete in the UCI Continental Circuits, which is divided into five continental zones: Africa, America, Asia, Europe and Oceania. Teams win points in the UCI World Ranking. Professional Continental teams are also invited to participate in events in the UCI World Tour, although they are not eligible to win points in the World Tour rankings.

== List of 2019 UCI Professional Continental teams ==
According to the UCI Rulebook,

"A professional continental team is an organisation created to take part in road events open to professional continental teams. It is known by a unique name and registered with the UCI in accordance with the provisions below.

- The professional continental team comprises all the riders registered with the UCI as members of the team. This includes the paying agent, the sponsors and all other persons contracted by the paying agent and/or the sponsors to provide for the continuing operation of the team (manager, team manager, coach, paramedical assistant, mechanic, etc.).
- Each professional continental team must employ at least 14 riders, 2 team managers and 3 other staff (paramedical assistants, mechanics, etc.) on a full time basis to be eligible for the whole registration year."

Code	Official Team Name	Country	Continent
ANS	Androni Giocattoli–Sidermec	Italy	Europe
BRD	Bardiani–CSF	Italy	Europe
BBH	Burgos BH	Spain	Europe
CJR	Caja Rural–Seguros RGA	Spain	Europe
COF	Cofidis	France	Europe
COC	Corendon–Circus	Belgium	Europe
DMP	Delko–Marseille Provence	France	Europe
TDE	Total Direct Énergie	France	Europe
EUS	Euskadi–Murias	Spain	Europe
GAZ	Gazprom–RusVelo	Russia	Europe
HBA	Hagens Berman Axeon	United States	America
ICA	Israel Cycling Academy	Israel	Europe
MZN	Team Manzana Postobón	Colombia	America
NSK	Neri Sottoli–Selle Italia–KTM	Italy	Europe
NIP	Nippo–Vini Fantini–Faizanè	Italy	Europe
RLY	Rally UHC Cycling	United States	America
RIW	Riwal Readynez	Denmark	Europe
ROC	Roompot–Charles	Netherlands	Europe
SVB	Sport Vlaanderen–Baloise	Belgium	Europe
PCB	Arkéa–Samsic	France	Europe
TNN	Team Novo Nordisk	United States	America
VCB	Vital Concept–B&B Hotels	France	Europe
W52	W52 / FC Porto	Portugal	Europe
WVA	Wallonie Bruxelles	Belgium	Europe
WGG	Wanty–Gobert	Belgium	Europe

Aqua Blue Sport and United Healthcare folded after 2018.

CCC as well did not return but became the title sponsor of the former BMC team at the World Tour level.

Corendon Circus, Riwal Readynez, and W52/FC Porto moved up from the Continental level.

Willier Trestina Selle Italia changed sponsors to Neri Sottoli Selle Italia for 2019

Fortuno Samsic became Team Areka Samsic for 2019

Verandas Willems Crelan merged with team Roompot-Charles for 2019

Holowesko Citadel returned to the Continental level for 2019.

== List of 2019 UCI Continental teams ==
Code	Official Team Name	Country	Continent
BEX	Benediction–Excel Energy	Rwanda	Africa
GUE	Guerciotti–Kiwi Atlantico	Guinea-Bissau	Africa
PRO	ProTouch Sports	South Africa	Africa
CCS	Sovac Algérie	Algeria	Africa
ACM	Asociación Civil Mardan	Argentina	America
AVF	A.C. Agrupación Virgen de Fátima	Argentina	America
EMP	Equipo Continental Municipalidad de Pocito	Argentina	America
MRW	Municipalidad de Rawson	Argentina	America
SEP	Sindicato de Empleados Publicos de San Juan	Argentina	America
DCC	Drapac Cannondale Holistic Development Team	Australia	Oceania
FMP	Futuro–Maxxis Pro Cycling	Australia	Oceania
OLI	Oliver's Real Food Racing	Australia	Oceania
ACA	Pro Racing Sunshine Coast	Australia	Oceania
STG	St George Continental Cycling Team	Australia	Oceania
BLN	Team BridgeLane	Australia	Oceania
HAC	Hrinkow Advarics Cycleang	Austria	Europe
MPB	Maloja Pushbikers	Austria	Europe
CTN	SPORT.LAND. Niederösterreich Selle SMP–St. Rich	Austria	Europe
RSW	Team Felbermayr–Simplon Wels	Austria	Europe
VBG	Team Vorarlberg Santic	Austria	Europe
TIR	Tirol KTM Cycling Team	Austria	Europe
CIB	Cibel–Cebon	Belgium	Europe
PSB	Pauwels Sauzen–Bingoal	Belgium	Europe
TIS	Tarteletto–Isorex	Belgium	Europe
TFL	Telenet–Fidea Lions	Belgium	Europe
WBD	Wallonie–Bruxelles Development Team	Belgium	Europe
MCC	Minsk Cycling Club	Belarus	Europe
DPA	Deprisa Team	Bolivia	America
STF	Start Cycling Team	Bolivia	America
SFS	São Francisco Saúde-Klabin-SME Ribeirão Preto	Brazil	America
VIB	VIB Sports	Bahrain	Asia
BRC	Brunei Continental Cycling Team	Brunei	Asia
DCB	DCBank Pro Cycling Team	Canada	America
FPC	Floyd's Pro Cycling	Canada	America
PCD	Probaclac/Devinci	Canada	America
GCB	China Continental Team of Gansu Bank	China	Asia
MSS	Giant Cycling Team	China	Asia
HEN	Hengxiang Cycling Team	China	Asia
JLC	Jilun Cycling Team	China	Asia
KBS	Kunbao Sport Continental Cycling Team	China	Asia
MBE	Mitchelton–BikeExchange	China	Asia
NLC	Ningxia Sports Lottery Livall Gusto	China	Asia
TYD	Tianyoude Hotel Cycling Team	China	Asia
XDS	Shenzhen Xidesheng Cycling Team	China	Asia
TMC	Taiyuan Miogee Cycling Team	China	Asia
YUN	Yunnan Lvshan Landscape	China	Asia
BET	BetPlay Cycling Team	Colombia	America
BSM	Bicicletas Strongman–Colombia Coldeportes	Colombia	America
CZS	Coldeportes–Zenú–Sello Rojo	Colombia	America
EPM	EPM	Colombia	America
EOP	Orgullo Paisa	Colombia	America
GWS	GW–Shimano	Colombia	America
MED	Medellín	Colombia	America
MKT	Meridiana–Kamen	Croatia	Europe
ACS	AC Sparta Praha	Czech Republic	Europe
ELA	Elkov–Author	Czech Republic	Europe
PAR	Pardus–Tufo Prostějov	Czech Republic	Europe
TDP	Team Dukla Praha	Czech Republic	Europe
ABB	BHS–Almeborg Bornholm	Denmark	Europe
TCQ	Team ColoQuick	Denmark	Europe
TVC	Team Waoo	Denmark	Europe
DCT	Inteja Dominican Cycling Team	Dominican Republic	America
MTE	Team Ecuador	Ecuador	America
PLK	Polartec–Kometa	Spain	Europe
EUK	Fundación Euskadi	Spain	Europe
MPC	Memil CCN Pro Cycling	Finland	Europe
CGF	Équipe Continentale Groupama–FDJ	France	Europe
NRL	Natura4Ever–Roubaix–Lille Métropole	France	Europe
AUB	St. Michel–Auber93	France	Europe
DHB	Canyon dhb p/b Bloor Homes	United Kingdom	Europe
MGT	Madison Genesis	United Kingdom	Europe
RPC	Ribble Pro Cycling	United Kingdom	Europe
SCB	SwiftCarbon Pro Cycling	United Kingdom	Europe
WGN	Team Wiggins Le Col	United Kingdom	Europe
VIT	Vitus Pro Cycling Team p/b Brother UK	United Kingdom	Europe
BAI	Bike Aid	Germany	Europe
DSU	Development Team Sunweb	Germany	Europe
HRN	Heizomat–rad-net.de	Germany	Europe
LKT	LKT Team Brandenburg	Germany	Europe
TDA	Dauner D&DQ–Akkon	Germany	Europe
LKH	Team Lotto–Kern Haus	Germany	Europe
SVL	Team Sauerland NRW p/b SKS Germany	Germany	Europe
HKS	HKSI Pro Cycling Team	Hong Kong	Asia
XSU	X-Speed United	Hong Kong	Asia
KBN	Kőbánya Cycling Team	Hungary	Europe
PNN	Pannon Cycling Team	Hungary	Europe
CCI	Customs Cycling Indonesia	Indonesia	Asia
KFC	KFC Cycling Team	Indonesia	Asia
PGN	PGN Road Cycling Team	Indonesia	Asia
DFT	Fengsheng Sports DFT Team	Iran	Asia
FSC	Foolad Mobarakeh Sepahan	Iran	Asia
OMT	Omidnia Mashhad Team	Iran	Asia
HOL	Holdsworth	Ireland	Europe
BIC	Biesse–Carrera Gavardo	Italy	Europe
CTF	Cycling Team Friuli	Italy	Europe
AZT	D'Amico Utensilnord	Italy	Europe
IRC	Iseo Serrature–Rime–Carnovali	Italy	Europe
SMV	Sangemini–MG.K Vis Vega	Italy	Europe
BHP	Team Beltrami TSA–Hopplà–Petroli Firenze	Italy	Europe
CPK	Team Colpack	Italy	Europe
AIS	Aisan Racing Team	Japan	Asia
IPC	Interpro Stradalli	Japan	Asia
KIN	Kinan Cycling Team	Japan	Asia
MTR	Matrix Powertag	Japan	Asia
NAS	Nasu Blasen	Japan	Asia
SMN	Shimano Racing Team	Japan	Asia
BGT	Team Bridgestone Cycling	Japan	Asia
UKO	Team Ukyo	Japan	Asia
BLZ	Utsunomiya Blitzen	Japan	Asia
APL	Apple Team	Kazakhstan	Asia
TSE	Astana City	Kazakhstan	Asia
VAM	Vino–Astana Motors	Kazakhstan	Asia
GPC	Gapyeong Cycling Team	South Korea	Asia
GIC	Geumsan Insam Cello	South Korea	Asia
KCT	Korail Cycling Team	South Korea	Asia
KSP	KSPO Bianchi Asia	South Korea	Asia
LXC	LX Cycling Team	South Korea	Asia
SCT	Seoul Cycling Team	South Korea	Asia
UCT	Uijeongbu Cycling Team	South Korea	Asia
KWT	Massi–Kuwait	Kuwait	Asia
CCN	Nex CCN	Laos	Asia
AMO	Amore & Vita–Prodir	Latvia	Europe
STC	Staki–Technorama	Lithuania	Europe
LPC	Leopard Pro Cycling	Luxembourg	Europe
CCD	Team Differdange–Geba	Luxembourg	Europe
FAR	Forca Amskins Racing	Malaysia	Asia
TSC	Team Sapura Cycling	Malaysia	Asia
TSG	Terengganu Cycling Team	Malaysia	Asia
CAS	Canel's–Specialized	Mexico	America
NCA	Project Nice Côte d'Azur	Mongolia	Asia
ALE	Alecto Cycling Team	Netherlands	Europe
BRT	BEAT Cycling Club	Netherlands	Europe
DCR	Delta Cycling Rotterdam	Netherlands	Europe
DES	Destil–Parkhotel Valkenburg	Netherlands	Europe
MET	Metec–TKH	Netherlands	Europe
MCT	Monkey Town Continental Team	Netherlands	Europe
SEG	SEG Racing Academy	Netherlands	Europe
VLA	Vlasman Cycling Team	Netherlands	Europe
TJI	Joker Icopal	Norway	Europe
TCO	Team Coop	Norway	Europe
UXT	Uno-X Norwegian Development Team	Norway	Europe
VIV	Vivo Team Grupo Oresy	Paraguay	America
7RP	7 Eleven–Cliqq Roadbike Philippines	Philippines	Asia
CDT	CCC Development Team	Poland	Europe
THU	Hurom BDC Development	Poland	Europe
VOS	Voster ATS Team	Poland	Europe
WIB	Wibatech Merx 7R	Poland	Europe
ALU	Aviludo–Louletano	Portugal	Europe
EFP	Efapel	Portugal	Europe
LAA	LA Alumínios	Portugal	Europe
LSC	Liberty Seguros–Carglass	Portugal	Europe
MIR	Miranda–Mortágua	Portugal	Europe
RPB	Rádio Popular–Boavista	Portugal	Europe
STA	Sporting / Tavira	Portugal	Europe
VFB	Vito–Feirense–BlackJack	Portugal	Europe
W52	W52 / FC Porto	Portugal	Europe
MST	MsTina–Focus	Romania	Europe
TNV	Team Novak	Romania	Europe
DDC	Dimension Data for Qhubeka	South Africa	Africa
LOK	Lokosphinx	Russia	Europe
ADR	Adria Mobil	Slovenia	Europe
LGS	Ljubljana Gusto Santic	Slovenia	Europe
DGV	Dare Gaviota	Serbia	Europe
JVP	Java Partizan	Serbia	Europe
AKR	Akros–Renfer SA	Switzerland	Europe
DKB	Dukla Banská Bystrica	Slovakia	Europe
TCC	Thailand Continental Cycling Team	Thailand	Asia
TRK	Torku Şekerspor	Turkey	Europe
SHJ	Sharjah Team	United Arab Emirates	Asia
LCT	Lviv Cycling Team	Ukraine	Europe
TKC	Kyiv Capital Team	Ukraine	Europe
3O3	303Project	United States	America
AEV	Aevolo	United States	America
AHB	Arapahoe Hincapie p/b BMC	United States	America
ELV	Elevate–KHS Pro Cycling	United States	America
ILU	Team Illuminate	United States	America
TSL	Team Skyline	United States	America
WGC	Wildlife Generation Pro Cycling p/b Maxxis	United States	America
TAS	Tashkent Cycling Team	Uzbekistan	Asia

Preceded by 2018	List of UCI Professional Continental and Continental teams 2019	Succeeded by 2020
