= List of 2020 UCI ProTeams and Continental teams =

The Union Cycliste Internationale (UCI) – the governing body of cycling – categorizes teams into three divisions. The first division, consisting of the top 19 teams, are classified as UCI WorldTeams, and compete in the UCI World Tour. The second and third divisions respectively are the ProTeams (formerly Professional Continental teams) and the Continental teams.

== 2020 UCI ProTeams ==
According to the UCI Rulebook,

"A ProTeam is an organisation created to take part in road events open to ProTeams. It is known by a unique name and registered with the UCI in accordance with the provisions below.

- The ProTeam comprises all the riders registered with the UCI as members of the team. This includes the paying agent, the sponsors and all other persons contracted by the paying agent and/or the sponsors to provide for the continuing operation of the team (manager, team manager, coach, paramedical assistant, mechanic, etc.).
- Each ProTeam must employ at least 20 riders, 3 team managers and 5 other staff (paramedical assistants, mechanics, etc.) on a full time basis to be eligible for the whole registration year."

ProTeams compete in the UCI Continental Circuits, which is divided into five continental zones: Africa, America, Asia, Europe and Oceania. Sometimes, teams are also invited to participate in UCI World Tour and UCI ProSeries events, usually through wildcard invitations, although they are not eligible to win points in the World Tour rankings.

Code	Official Team Name	Country	Continent
AFC	Alpecin–Fenix	Belgium	Europe
ANS	Androni Giocattoli–Sidermec	Italy	Europe
ARK	Arkéa–Samsic	France	Europe
BVC	B&B Hotels–Vital Concept	France	Europe
BRD	Bardiani–CSF–Faizanè	Italy	Europe
WVA	Bingoal–Wallonie Bruxelles	Belgium	Europe
BBH	Burgos BH	Spain	Europe
CJR	Caja Rural–Seguros RGA	Spain	Europe
CWG	Circus–Wanty Gobert	Belgium	Europe
FOR	Euskaltel–Euskadi	Spain	Europe
GAZ	Gazprom–RusVelo	Russia	Europe
NDP	Nippo–Delko–One Provence	France	Europe
RLY	Rally Cycling	United States	America
RIW	Riwal Securitas	Denmark	Europe
SVB	Sport Vlaanderen–Baloise	Belgium	Europe
TNN	Team Novo Nordisk	United States	America
TDE	Total Direct Énergie	France	Europe
UXT	Uno-X Pro Cycling Team	Norway	Europe
THR	Vini Zabù–Brado–KTM	Italy	Europe

== 2020 UCI Continental teams ==
Continental teams, the third division of the UCI cycling pyramid, compete almost exclusively in the UCI Continental Circuits while sometimes getting wildcard invitations to UCI ProSeries events as well.

Code	Official Team Name	Country	Continent
GSP	Groupement Sportif des Pétroliers	Algeria	Africa
BSP	BAI–Sicasal–Petro de Luanda	Angola	Africa
AVF	Agrupación Virgen de Fátima–SaddleDrunk	Argentina	America
CSL	Equipo Continental San Luis	Argentina	America
EMP	Equipo Continental Municipalidad de Pocito	Argentina	America
MRW	Municipalidad de Rawson	Argentina	America
SEP	Sindicato de Empleados Publicos de San Juan	Argentina	America
TPC	Transportes Puertas de Cuyo	Argentina	America
ACA	ARA Pro Racing Sunshine Coast	Australia	Oceania
NER	Nero Continental	Australia	Oceania
OLI	Oliver's Real Food Racing	Australia	Oceania
STG	St George Continental Cycling Team	Australia	Oceania
BLN	Team BridgeLane	Australia	Oceania
RSW	Team Felbermayr–Simplon Wels	Austria	Europe
HAC	Hrinkow Advarics Cycleang	Austria	Europe
CTN	SPORT.LAND. Niederösterreich	Austria	Europe
VBG	Team Vorarlberg Santic	Austria	Europe
TIR	Tirol KTM Cycling Team	Austria	Europe
WSA	WSA KTM Graz	Austria	Europe
BCA	Bahrain Cycling Academy	Bahrain	Asia
FCT	Ferei–CCN	Belarus	Europe
MCC	Minsk Cycling Club	Belarus	Europe
PSB	Pauwels Sauzen–Bingoal	Belgium	Europe
TIS	Tarteletto–Isorex	Belgium	Europe
TBL	Telenet–Baloise Lions	Belgium	Europe
WBD	Wallonie–Bruxelles Development Team	Belgium	Europe
SFS	São Francisco Saúde–SME Ribeirão Preto	Brazil	America
CCA	Cambodia Cycling Academy	Cambodia	Asia
DCP	DC Bank/Probaclac	Canada	America
XSU	X-Speed United	Canada	America
GCB	China Continental Team of Gansu Bank	China	Asia
DCS	Docs Cycling Team	China	Asia
MSS	Giant Cycling Team	China	Asia
HEN	Hengxiang Cycling Team	China	Asia
JLC	Jilun Cycling Team	China	Asia
KBS	Kunbao Sport Continental Cycling Team	China	Asia
NLC	Ningxia Sports Lottery Continental Team	China	Asia
XDS	Shenzhen Xidesheng Cycling Team	China	Asia
SMC	SSOIS Miogee Cycling Team	China	Asia
TYD	Tianyoude Hotel Cycling Team	China	Asia
WNH	Wunvhu Cycling Team	China	Asia
YUN	Yunnan Lvshan Landscape	China	Asia
CTA	Colombia Tierra de Atletas–GW Bicicletas	Colombia	America
EPM	EPM–Scott	Colombia	America
ECS	Equipo Continental Supergiros	Colombia	America
MED	Team Medellín	Colombia	America
EOP	Equipe Continental Orgullo Paisa	Colombia	America
MKT	Meridiana–Kamen	Croatia	Europe
ACS	AC Sparta Praha	Czech Republic	Europe
ELA	Elkov–Kasper	Czech Republic	Europe
TLT	Topforex–Lapierre	Czech Republic	Europe
SKC	Tufo–Pardus Prostějov	Czech Republic	Europe
ABB	BHS–PL Beton Bornholm	Denmark	Europe
TCQ	Team ColoQuick	Denmark	Europe
BES	Best PC Ecuador	Ecuador	America
EKP	Equipo Kern Pharma	Spain	Europe
KTX	Kometa Xstra Cycling Team	Spain	Europe
TBC	Tartu2024–BalticChainCycling.com	Estonia	Europe
CGF	Équipe Continentale Groupama–FDJ	France	Europe
NRL	Natura4Ever–Roubaix–Lille Métropole	France	Europe
AUB	St. Michel–Auber93	France	Europe
BAI	Bike Aid	Germany	Europe
TDA	Dauner–Akkon	Germany	Europe
DSU	Development Team Sunweb	Germany	Europe
LKT	LKT Team Brandenburg	Germany	Europe
LKH	Team Lotto–Kern Haus	Germany	Europe
PBS	Maloja Pushbikers	Germany	Europe
PBS	P&S Metalltechnik	Germany	Europe
RNR	Rad-Net Rose Team	Germany	Europe
SVL	Team SKS Sauerland NRW	Germany	Europe
DHB	Canyon dhb p/b Soreen	United Kingdom	Europe
RWC	Ribble Weldtite	United Kingdom	Europe
SCB	SwiftCarbon Pro Cycling	United Kingdom	Europe
VIT	Vitus Pro Cycling Team p/b Brother UK	United Kingdom	Europe
CMI	EuroCyclingTrips–CMI	Guam	Oceania
HKS	HKSI Pro Cycling Team	Hong Kong	Asia
KFC	KFC Cycling Team	Indonesia	Asia
PGN	Mula Cycling Team	Indonesia	Asia
FSC	Foolad Mobarakeh Sepahan	Iran	Asia
MES	Mes Kerman	Iran	Asia
OMT	Omidnia Mashhad Team	Iran	Asia
TCT	Tabriz Cycling Team	Iran	Asia
EVO	EvoPro Racing	Ireland	Europe
ISA	Israel Cycling Academy	Israel	Europe
BTM	Beltrami TSA–Marchiol	Italy	Europe
BIA	Biesse–Arvedi	Italy	Europe
CPH	Casillo–Petroli Firenze–Hopplà	Italy	Europe
CTF	Cycling Team Friuli ASD	Italy	Europe
AZT	D'Amico–UM Tools	Italy	Europe
GEF	General Store–Essegibi–Fratelli Curia	Italy	Europe
IRC	Iseo Serrature–Rime–Carnovali	Italy	Europe
NPC	NTT Continental Cycling Team	Italy	Europe
SAT	Efapel	Italy	Europe
CPK	Team Colpack–Ballan	Italy	Europe
IWD	Work Service–Dinatek–Vega	Italy	Europe
AIS	Aisan Racing Team	Japan	Asia
KIN	Kinan Cycling Team	Japan	Asia
MTR	Matrix Powertag	Japan	Asia
NAS	Nasu Blasen	Japan	Asia
SDV	Saitama Dreve	Japan	Asia
SMN	Shimano Racing Team	Japan	Asia
BGT	Team Bridgestone Cycling	Japan	Asia
UKO	Team Ukyo	Japan	Asia
BLZ	Utsunomiya Blitzen	Japan	Asia
VCH	Victoire Hiroshima	Japan	Asia
APL	Apple Team	Kazakhstan	Asia
VAM	Vino–Astana Motors	Kazakhstan	Asia
GPC	Gapyeong Cycling Team	South Korea	Asia
GIC	Geumsan Insam Cello	South Korea	Asia
KSP	KSPO Professional	South Korea	Asia
KCT	KTX Korail Cycling Team	South Korea	Asia
LXC	LX Cycling Team	South Korea	Asia
SCT	Seoul Cycling Team	South Korea	Asia
UCT	Uijeongbu Cycling Team	South Korea	Asia
AMO	Amore & Vita–Prodir	Latvia	Europe
LPC	Leopard Pro Cycling	Luxembourg	Europe
TSC	Team Sapura Cycling	Malaysia	Asia
TSG	Terengganu Inc. TSG	Malaysia	Asia
CAS	Canel's–Zerouno	Mexico	America
CRS	Crisa–SEEI Pro Cycling	Mexico	America
SPT	Sidi Ali Pro Cycling	Morocco	Africa
ABC	à Bloc	Netherlands	Europe
BRT	BEAT Cycling Club	Netherlands	Europe
JVD	Jumbo–Visma Development Team	Netherlands	Europe
MET	Metec–TKH	Netherlands	Europe
SEG	SEG Racing Academy	Netherlands	Europe
VLA	Vlasman Cycling Team	Netherlands	Europe
VWM	VolkerWessels–Merckx Cycling Team	Netherlands	Europe
JFN	Joker Fuel of Norway	Norway	Europe
TCO	Team Coop	Norway	Europe
BSC	Black Spoke Pro Cycling Academy	New Zealand	Oceania
MVC	Massi Vivo–Conecta	Paraguay	America
7RP	7 Eleven–Cliqq–air21 by Roadbike Philippines	Philippines	Asia
G4G	Go for Gold Philippines	Philippines	Asia
CDT	CCC Development Team	Poland	Europe
MSP	Mazowsze Serce Polski	Poland	Europe
VOS	Voster ATS Team	Poland	Europe
WIB	Wibatech Merx 7R	Poland	Europe
ATM	Atum General / Tavira / Maria Nova Hotel	Portugal	Europe
AVL	Aviludo–Louletano	Portugal	Europe
EFP	Efapel	Portugal	Europe
CDF	Feirense	Portugal	Europe
KIU	Kelly / Simoldes / UDO	Portugal	Europe
LAA	LA Alumínios / LA Sport	Portugal	Europe
MIR	Miranda–Mortágua	Portugal	Europe
RPB	Rádio Popular–Boavista	Portugal	Europe
W52	W52 / FC Porto	Portugal	Europe
GTV	Giotti Victoria	Romania	Europe
TNV	Team Novak	Romania	Europe
PRO	ProTouch	South Africa	Africa
LOK	Lokosphinx	Russia	Europe
BIG	Benediction Ignite	Rwanda	Africa
SAC	Skol Adrien Cycling Academy	Rwanda	Africa
ADR	Adria Mobil	Slovenia	Europe
LGS	Ljubljana Gusto Santic	Slovenia	Europe
DKB	Dukla Banská Bystrica	Slovakia	Europe
AET	Akros–Excelsior–Thömus	Switzerland	Europe
SRA	Swiss Racing Academy	Switzerland	Europe
MPC	Memil Pro Cycling	Sweden	Europe
TCC	Thailand Continental Cycling Team	Thailand	Asia
SBB	Salcano–Sakarya BB Team	Turkey	Europe
STC	Spor Toto Cycling Team	Turkey	Europe
AEV	Aevolo	United States	America
ELV	Elevate–Webiplex Pro Cycling	United States	America
HBA	Hagens Berman Axeon	United States	America
HLB	Hincapie–Leomo p/b BMC	United States	America
ILU	Team Illuminate	United States	America
TSL	Team Skyline	United States	America
WGC	Wildlife Generation Pro Cycling	United States	America
GIO	Gios–Kiwi Atlántico	Venezuela	America

Preceded by 2019	List of UCI ProTeams and Continental teams 2020	Succeeded by 2021
