= List of 2021 UCI ProTeams and Continental teams =

The Union Cycliste Internationale (UCI) – the governing body of cycling – categorizes teams into three divisions. The first division, consisting of the top 19 teams, were classified as UCI WorldTeams, and competed in the UCI World Tour. The second and third divisions, respectively, were the ProTeams (formerly Professional Continental teams) and the Continental teams.

== 2021 UCI ProTeams ==
According to the UCI Rulebook,

"A ProTeam is an organisation created to take part in road events open to ProTeams. It is known by a unique name and registered with the UCI in accordance with the provisions below.

- The ProTeam comprises all the riders registered with the UCI as members of the team. This includes the paying agent, the sponsors and all other persons contracted by the paying agent and/or the sponsors to provide for the continuing operation of the team (manager, team manager, coach, paramedical assistant, mechanic, etc.).
- Each ProTeam must employ at least 20 riders, 3 team managers and 5 other staff (paramedical assistants, mechanics, etc.) on a full time basis to be eligible for the whole registration year."

ProTeams compete in the UCI Continental Circuits, which is divided into five continental zones: Africa, America, Asia, Europe and Oceania. Sometimes, teams are also invited to participate in UCI World Tour and UCI ProSeries events, usually through wildcard invitations, although they are not eligible to win points in the World Tour rankings.

Code	Official Team Name	Country	Continent
AFC	Alpecin–Fenix	Belgium	Europe
ANS	Androni Giocattoli–Sidermec	Italy	Europe
ARK	Arkéa–Samsic	France	Europe
BBK	B&B Hotels p/b KTM	France	Europe
BCF	Bardiani–CSF–Faizanè	Italy	Europe
BWB	Bingoal Pauwels Sauces WB	Belgium	Europe
BBH	Burgos BH	Spain	Europe
CJR	Caja Rural–Seguros RGA	Spain	Europe
DKO	Delko	France	Europe
EOK	Eolo–Kometa	Italy	Europe
EKP	Equipo Kern Pharma	Spain	Europe
FOR	Euskaltel–Euskadi	Spain	Europe
GAZ	Gazprom–RusVelo	Russia	Europe
RLY	Rally Cycling	United States	America
SVB	Sport Vlaanderen–Baloise	Belgium	Europe
TNN	Team Novo Nordisk	United States	America
TDE	Team TotalEnergies	France	Europe
UXT	Uno-X Pro Cycling Team	Norway	Europe
THR	Vini Zabù	Italy	Europe

== 2021 UCI Continental teams ==
Continental teams, the third division of the UCI cycling pyramid, compete almost exclusively in the UCI Continental Circuits while sometimes getting wildcard invitations to UCI ProSeries events as well.

Code	Official Team Name	Country	Continent
AVF	Agrupación Virgen de Fátima	Argentina	America
EHE	Electro Hiper Europa	Argentina	America
CSL	Equipo Continental San Luis	Argentina	America
EMP	Equipo Continental Municipalidad de Pocito	Argentina	America
MRW	Municipalidad de Rawson	Argentina	America
SEP	Sindicato de Empleados Publicos de San Juan	Argentina	America
TPC	Transportes Puertas de Cuyo	Argentina	America
ACA	ARA Pro Racing Sunshine Coast	Australia	Oceania
NER	Nero Continental	Australia	Oceania
STG	St George Continental Cycling Team	Australia	Oceania
BLN	Team BridgeLane	Australia	Oceania
HAC	Hrinkow Advarics Cycleang	Austria	Europe
RSW	Team Felbermayr–Simplon Wels	Austria	Europe
VBG	Team Vorarlberg	Austria	Europe
TIR	Tirol KTM Cycling Team	Austria	Europe
URT	Union Raiffeisen Radteam Tirol	Austria	Europe
WSA	WSA KTM Graz	Austria	Europe
BCA	Bahrain Cycling Academy	Bahrain	Asia
BAZ	BelAZ	Belarus	Europe
FCT	Ferei–CCN	Belarus	Europe
MCC	Minsk Cycling Club	Belarus	Europe
AFD	Alpecin–Fenix Development Team	Belgium	Europe
TBL	Baloise–Trek Lions	Belgium	Europe
TIS	Tarteletto–Isorex	Belgium	Europe
WBD	Bingoal WB Development Team	Belgium	Europe
PRC	Pío Rico Cycling Team	Bolivia	America
CCA	Cambodia Cycling Academy	Cambodia	Asia
XSU	X-Speed United	Canada	America
Y4M	Yoeleo Test Team p/b 4Mind	Canada	America
CFC	CFC Continental Team	China	Asia
GCB	China Continental Team of Gansu Bank	China	Asia
CHJ	China Huajian Cycling Team	China	Asia
MSS	Giant Cycling Team	China	Asia
HEN	Hengxiang Cycling Team	China	Asia
LNS	Li-Ning Star Cycling Team	China	Asia
NLC	Ningxia Sports Lottery Continental Team	China	Asia
PDS	Pardus Cycling Team	China	Asia
XDS	Shenzhen Xidesheng Cycling Team	China	Asia
TMC	Taiyuan Miogee Cycling Team	China	Asia
TYD	Tianyoude Hotel Cycling Team	China	Asia
CCM	Colnago CM Team	Colombia	America
CTA	Colombia Tierra de Atletas–GW Bicicletas	Colombia	America
EOP	Equipe Continental Orgullo Paisa	Colombia	America
ECS	Equipo Continental Supergiros	Colombia	America
MED	Team Medellín–EPM	Colombia	America
MKT	Meridiana–Kamen	Croatia	Europe
ACS	AC Sparta Praha	Czech Republic	Europe
EKA	Elkov–Kasper	Czech Republic	Europe
TFA	Topforex–ATT Investments	Czech Republic	Europe
SKC	Tufo–Pardus Prostějov	Czech Republic	Europe
BPC	BHS–PL Beton Bornholm	Denmark	Europe
SCC	Restaurant Suri–Carl Ras	Denmark	Europe
RIW	Riwal Cycling Team	Denmark	Europe
TCQ	Team ColoQuick	Denmark	Europe
BES	Best PC Ecuador	Ecuador	America
ADT	Ampler Development Team	Estonia	Europe
CGF	Équipe Continentale Groupama–FDJ	France	Europe
AUB	St. Michel–Auber93	France	Europe
XRL	Xelliss–Roubaix–Lille Métropole	France	Europe
BAI	Bike Aid	Germany	Europe
TDA	Dauner–Akkon	Germany	Europe
DDS	Development Team DSM	Germany	Europe
PBS	Maloja Pushbikers	Germany	Europe
PUS	P&S Metalltechnik	Germany	Europe
RNR	Rad-Net Rose Team	Germany	Europe
LKH	Team Lotto–Kern Haus	Germany	Europe
SVL	Team SKS Sauerland NRW	Germany	Europe
CMI	EuroCyclingTrips–CMI	Guam	Oceania
HKS	HKSI Pro Cycling Team	Hong Kong	Asia
MLA	Mula Cycling Team	Indonesia	Asia
RJC	Roojai.com Cycling Team	Indonesia	Asia
FSC	Foolad Mobarakeh Sepahan	Iran	Asia
ICP	Iraq Cycling Project	Iraq	Asia
EVO	EvoPro Racing	Ireland	Europe
ICA	Israel Cycling Academy	Israel	Europe
BTC	Beltrami TSA–Tre Colli	Italy	Europe
BIA	Biesse–Arvedi	Italy	Europe
CTF	Cycling Team Friuli ASD	Italy	Europe
AZT	D'Amico–UM Tools	Italy	Europe
GEF	General Store–Fratelli Curia–Essegibi	Italy	Europe
IRC	Iseo–Rime–Carnovali	Italy	Europe
MGK	MG.K Vis VPM	Italy	Europe
CPK	Team Colpack–Ballan	Italy	Europe
T4Q	Team Qhubeka	Italy	Europe
IWD	Work Service–Marchiol–Vega	Italy	Europe
ZEF	Zalf Euromobil Fior	Italy	Europe
AIS	Aisan Racing Team	Japan	Asia
KIN	Kinan Cycling Team	Japan	Asia
MTR	Matrix Powertag	Japan	Asia
NAS	Nasu Blasen	Japan	Asia
SMN	Shimano Racing Team	Japan	Asia
BGT	Team Bridgestone Cycling	Japan	Asia
UKO	Team Ukyo Sagamihara	Japan	Asia
BLZ	Utsunomiya Blitzen	Japan	Asia
ALT	Almaty Cycling Team	Kazakhstan	Asia
VAM	Vino–Astana Motors	Kazakhstan	Asia
KPT	Kuwait Pro Cycling Team	Kuwait	Asia
LPC	Leopard Pro Cycling	Luxembourg	Europe
SNC	Sweet Nice Continental Cycling Team	Malaysia	Asia
TSC	Team Sapura Cycling	Malaysia	Asia
TSG	Terengganu Cycling Team	Malaysia	Asia
CAZ	Canel's–Zerouno	Mexico	America
SPT	Sidi Ali–Kinetik Sports	Morocco	Africa
ABC	Abloc CT	Netherlands	Europe
BCY	BEAT Cycling	Netherlands	Europe
JVD	Jumbo–Visma Development Team	Netherlands	Europe
MET	Metec–Solarwatt p/b Mantel	Netherlands	Europe
SEG	SEG Racing Academy	Netherlands	Europe
VWE	VolkerWessels Cycling Team	Netherlands	Europe
BSC	Black Spoke Pro Cycling	New Zealand	Oceania
GLC	Global 6 Cycling	New Zealand	Oceania
TCO	Team Coop	Norway	Europe
UDT	Uno-X Dare Development Team	Norway	Europe
PCV	Panamá es Cultura y Valores	Panama	America
MVC	Massi Vivo–Conecta	Paraguay	America
7RP	7 Eleven–Cliqq–air21 by Roadbike Philippines	Philippines	Asia
G4G	Go for Gold Philippines	Philippines	Asia
MSP	HRE Mazowsze Serce Polski	Poland	Europe
VOS	Voster ATS Team	Poland	Europe
CDF	Antarte–Feirense	Portugal	Europe
ATM	Atum General / Tavira / Maria Nova Hotel	Portugal	Europe
EFP	Efapel	Portugal	Europe
KSU	Kelly / Simoldes / UDO	Portugal	Europe
LAA	LA Alumínios / LA Sport	Portugal	Europe
LLC	Louletano–Loulé Concelho	Portugal	Europe
RPB	Rádio Popular–Boavista	Portugal	Europe
TAV	Tavfer–Measindot–Mortágua	Portugal	Europe
W52	W52 / FC Porto	Portugal	Europe
GTS	Giotti Victoria–Savini Due	Romania	Europe
TNV	Team Novak	Romania	Europe
LOK	Lokosphinx	Russia	Europe
BIG	Benediction Ignite	Rwanda	Africa
SAC	Skol Adrien Cycling Academy	Rwanda	Africa
AMX	A.R. Monex Pro Cycling Team	San Marino	Europe
CAT	Cycling Academy Trenčín	Slovakia	Europe
DKB	Dukla Banská Bystrica	Slovakia	Europe
ADR	Adria Mobil	Slovenia	Europe
LGS	Ljubljana Gusto Santic	Slovenia	Europe
PRO	ProTouch	South Africa	Africa
GPC	Gapyeong Cycling Team	South Korea	Asia
GIC	Geumsan Insam Cello	South Korea	Asia
KCT	Korail Cycling Team	South Korea	Asia
KSP	KSPO Professional	South Korea	Asia
LXC	LX Cycling Team	South Korea	Asia
SCT	Seoul Cycling Team	South Korea	Asia
UCT	Uijeongbu Cycling Team	South Korea	Asia
NIP	Nippo–Provence–PTS Conti	Switzerland	Europe
SRA	Swiss Racing Academy	Switzerland	Europe
TCC	Thailand Continental Cycling Team	Thailand	Asia
MPC	Meiyo CCN Pro Cycling	Taiwan	Asia
SBB	Salcano–Sakarya BB Team	Turkey	Europe
STC	Spor Toto Cycling Team	Turkey	Europe
AMO	Amore & Vita	Ukraine	Europe
EGU	Eurocar–Grawe	Ukraine	Europe
LCT	Lviv Cycling Team	Ukraine	Europe
DHB	Canyon dhb SunGod	United Kingdom	Europe
RWC	Ribble Weldtite	United Kingdom	Europe
SPC	Saint Piran	United Kingdom	Europe
SCB	SwiftCarbon Pro Cycling	United Kingdom	Europe
TRI	Trinity Racing	United Kingdom	Europe
AEV	Aevolo	United States	America
ELV	Elevate–Webiplex Pro Cycling	United States	America
HBA	Hagens Berman Axeon	United States	America
LLA	L39ION of Los Angeles	United States	America
ILU	Team Illuminate	United States	America
TND	Team Novo Nordisk Development	United States	America
TSL	Team Skyline	United States	America
WGC	Wildlife Generation Pro Cycling	United States	America
GIO	Gios	Venezuela	America
STF	Start Cycling Team	Venezuela	America

Preceded by 2020	List of UCI ProTeams and Continental teams 2021	Succeeded by 2022
