= List of 2022 UCI ProTeams and Continental teams =

List of cycling teams

The Union Cycliste Internationale (UCI) – the governing body of cycling – categorizes teams into three divisions. The first division, consisting of the top 18 teams, is classified as UCI WorldTeams, and competes in the UCI World Tour. The second and third divisions, respectively, are the ProTeams (formerly known as Professional Continental teams) and the Continental teams.

== 2022 UCI ProTeams ==
According to the UCI Rulebook,

A UCI ProTeam is an organisation created to take part in road events open to UCI ProTeams . . . [and] is known by a unique name and registered with the UCI in accordance with the provisions below.

- The UCI ProTeam comprises all the riders registered with the UCI as members of the team, the paying agent, the sponsors and all other persons contracted by the paying agent and/or the sponsors to provide for the operation of the team (manager, sports director, coach, paramedical assistant, mechanic, etc.).
- Each ProTeam must employ at least 20 riders, 3 team managers and 5 other staff (paramedical assistants, mechanics, etc.) on a full time basis to be eligible for the whole registration year.

ProTeams compete in the UCI Continental Circuits, which are divided into five continental zones: Africa, America, Asia, Europe, and Oceania. Sometimes, teams are also invited to participate in UCI World Tour and UCI ProSeries events, usually through wildcard invitations, although they are not eligible to win points in the World Tour rankings.

Code	Official Team Name	Country	Continent
AFC	Alpecin–Fenix	Belgium	Europe
ARK	Arkéa–Samsic	France	Europe
BBK	B&B Hotels–KTM	France	Europe
BCF	Bardiani–CSF–Faizanè	Italy	Europe
BWB	Bingoal Pauwels Sauces WB	Belgium	Europe
BBH	Burgos BH	Spain	Europe
CJR	Caja Rural–Seguros RGA	Spain	Europe
DRA	Drone Hopper–Androni Giocattoli	Italy	Europe
EOK	Eolo–Kometa	Italy	Europe
EKP	Equipo Kern Pharma	Spain	Europe
FOR	Euskaltel–Euskadi	Spain	Europe
GAZ	~~Gazprom–RusVelo~~ (Note: As of 1 March 2022, the UCI revoked the licences of Russian and Belarusian teams due to the Russian invasion of Ukraine.)	Russia	Europe
HPM	Human Powered Health	United States	America
SVB	Sport Vlaanderen–Baloise	Belgium	Europe
TNN	Team Novo Nordisk	United States	America
TEN	Team TotalEnergies	France	Europe
UXT	Uno-X Pro Cycling Team	Norway	Europe

== 2022 UCI Continental teams ==
According to the UCI Rulebook,

A UCI continental team or UCI women’s continental team is a team of road riders recognised and certified by the National Federation of the nationality of the majority of its riders to take part in road events on the international calendars.

- A UCI Continental team or UCI women's continental team will comprise riders who may or may not be professional, in the elite and/or under 23 categories. It must have minimum 10 riders for UCI continental teams, 8 for UCI women’s continental teams and a maximum of 16 riders for both categories.
- However, a UCI continental team shall also have the right to add up to 4 riders specialising in other endurance cycling disciplines (cyclo-cross; mountain bike: cross country; track: points race, scratch, pursuit, omnium) as long as the riders in question are among the top 150 of the last final UCI individual classification.

Continental teams, the third division of the UCI cycling pyramid, compete almost exclusively in the UCI Continental Circuits while sometimes getting wildcard invitations to UCI ProSeries events as well.

As of 11 May 2022

Code	Official Team Name	Country	Continent
BSP	BAI–Sicasal–Petro de Luanda	Angola	Africa
AVF	Agrupación Virgen de Fátima–San Juan Biker Motos	Argentina	South America
CTQ	Chimbas Te Quiero	Argentina	South America
EGD	Electro 3–Gremios por el Deporte	Argentina	South America
EMP	Equipo Continental Municipalidad de Pocito	Argentina	South America
MDR	Municipalidad de Rawson	Argentina	South America
CSL	Equipo Continental San Luis	Argentina	South America
SEP	Sindicato de Empleados Publicos de San Juan	Argentina	South America
ACA	ARA Pro Racing Sunshine Coast	Australia	Oceania
NER	Nero Continental	Australia	Oceania
STG	St George Continental Cycling Team	Australia	Oceania
BLN	Team BridgeLane	Australia	Oceania
HAC	Hrinkow Advarics	Austria	Europe
RSW	Team Felbermayr–Simplon Wels	Austria	Europe
VBG	Team Vorarlberg	Austria	Europe
TIR	Tirol KTM Cycling Team	Austria	Europe
URT	Union Raiffeisen Radteam Tirol	Austria	Europe
WSA	WSA KTM Graz p/b Leomo	Austria	Europe
BCA	Bahrain Cycling Academy	Bahrain	Asia
CCN	~~CCN Factory Racing~~	Belarus	Europe
MCC	~~Minsk Cycling Club~~	Belarus	Europe
AFD	Alpecin–Fenix Development Team	Belgium	Europe
WBD	Bingoal Pauwels Sauces WB Development Team	Belgium	Europe
EHS	Elevate p/b Home Solution–Soenens	Belgium	Europe
GDM	Geofco–Doltcini Matériel-vélo.com	Belgium	Europe
MCT	Minerva Cycling Team	Belgium	Europe
TIS	Tarteletto–Isorex	Belgium	Europe
PRC	Pío Rico Cycling Team	Bolivia	South America
SCP	Swift Carbon Pro Cycling Brasil	Brazil	South America
PTU	Premier Tech U-23 Cycling Project	Canada	America
TOR	Toronto Hustle	Canada	America
XSU	X-Speed United	Canada	America
Y4M	Yoeleo Test Team p/b 4Mind	Canada	America
CGS	China Glory Continental Cycling Team	China	Asia
MSS	Giant Cycling Team	China	Asia
BDR	Henan Bodywrap Cycling Team	China	Asia
HEN	Hengxiang Cycling Team	China	Asia
LNS	Li-Ning Star	China	Asia
NLC	Ningxia Sports Lottery Continental Team	China	Asia
PDS	Pardus Cycling Team	China	Asia
PIT	Pingtan International Tourism Island Cycling Team	China	Asia
XDS	Shenzhen Xidesheng Cycling Team	China	Asia
THT	The Hurricane & Thunder Cycling Team	China	Asia
TYD	Tianyoude Hotel Cycling Team	China	Asia
CTA	Colombia Tierra de Atletas–GW Shimano	Colombia	South America
EHE	Electro Hiper Europa–Caldas	Colombia	South America
MED	Team Medellín–EPM	Colombia	South America
MKT	Meridiana–Kamen	Croatia	Europe
ACS	AC Sparta Praha	Czech Republic	Europe
ATT	ATT Investments	Czech Republic	Europe
EKA	Elkov–Kasper	Czech Republic	Europe
SKC	TUFO–Pardus Prostějov	Czech Republic	Europe
BPC	BHS–PL Beton Bornholm	Denmark	Europe
GSH	Restaurant Suri–Carl Ras	Denmark	Europe
RIW	Riwal Cycling Team	Denmark	Europe
TCQ	Team ColoQuick	Denmark	Europe
MBP	Movistar–Best PC	Ecuador	South America
BGE	Team Banco Guayaquil–Ecuador	Ecuador	South America
TAT	Team Ampler–Tartu2024	Estonia	Europe
GRL	Go Sport–Roubaix–Lille Métropole	France	Europe
CGF	Équipe Continentale Groupama–FDJ	France	Europe
NMC	Nice Métropole Côte d'Azur	France	Europe
AUB	St. Michel–Auber93	France	Europe
UNA	Team UC Nantes Atlantique	France	Europe
BAI	Bike Aid	Germany	Europe
TDA	Dauner–Akkon	Germany	Europe
PBS	Maloja Pushbikers	Germany	Europe
PUS	P&S Benotti	Germany	Europe
RNR	Rad-Net Rose Team	Germany	Europe
SVL	Saris Rouvy Sauerland Team	Germany	Europe
SWT	Santic–Wibatech	Germany	Europe
LKH	Team Lotto–Kern Haus	Germany	Europe
ECT	EuroCyclingTrips Pro Cycling	Guam	Oceania
HKS	HKSI Pro Cycling Team	Hong Kong	Asia
MLA	Mula Cycling Team	Indonesia	Asia
RJC	Roojai Cycling Team	Indonesia	Asia
ASO	Arvich Shargh Omidnia	Iran	Asia
UAT	Azad University Team	Iran	Asia
EVO	EvoPro Racing	Ireland	Europe
ICA	Israel Cycling Academy	Israel	Europe
BTC	Beltrami TSA–Tre Colli	Italy	Europe
BIE	Biesse–Carrera	Italy	Europe
CAR	Carnovali–Rime	Italy	Europe
CTF	Cycling Team Friuli ASD	Italy	Europe
AZT	D'Amico–UM Tools	Italy	Europe
GAL	Gallina Ecotek Lucchini	Italy	Europe
GEF	General Store–Essegibi–Fratelli Curia	Italy	Europe
MGK	MG.K Vis Colors for Peace VPM	Italy	Europe
CPK	Team Colpack–Ballan	Italy	Europe
COR	Team Corratec	Italy	Europe
T4Q	Team Qhubeka	Italy	Europe
IWM	Work Service–Vitalcare–Vega	Italy	Europe
ZEF	Zalf Euromobil Fior	Italy	Europe
AIS	Aisan Racing Team	Japan	Asia
KIN	Kinan Racing Team	Japan	Asia
MTR	Matrix Powertag	Japan	Asia
NAS	Nasu Blasen	Japan	Asia
SMN	Shimano Racing	Japan	Asia
BGT	Team Bridgestone Cycling	Japan	Asia
UKO	Team Ukyo	Japan	Asia
BLZ	Utsunomiya Blitzen	Japan	Asia
VCH	Victoire Hiroshima	Japan	Asia
ALT	Almaty Cycling Team	Kazakhstan	Asia
AQD	Astana Qazaqstan Development Team	Kazakhstan	Asia
VSM	Vino SKO Team	Kazakhstan	Asia
KPT	Kuwait Pro Cycling Team	Kuwait	Asia
KCC	Kaunas Cycling Team	Lithuania	Europe
VCT	Voltas Cycling Team	Lithuania	Europe
LPC	Leopard Pro Cycling	Luxembourg	Europe
SNC	Sweet Nice Continental Cycling Team	Malaysia	Asia
TSC	Team Sapura Cycling	Malaysia	Asia
TSG	Terengganu Polygon Cycling Team	Malaysia	Asia
FMD	Ferei Mongolia Development Team	Mongolia	Asia
SUT	Sidi Ali–Unlock Team	Morocco	Africa
ABC	Abloc CT	Netherlands	Europe
ALQ	Allinq Continental Cycling Team	Netherlands	Europe
BCY	BEAT Cycling	Netherlands	Europe
DDS	Development Team DSM	Netherlands	Europe
JVD	Jumbo–Visma Development Team	Netherlands	Europe
MET	Metec–Solarwatt p/b Mantel	Netherlands	Europe
VWE	VolkerWessels Cycling Team	Netherlands	Europe
TCO	Team Coop	Norway	Europe
UDT	Uno-X Dare Development Team	Norway	Europe
BEB	Bolton Equities Black Spoke Pro Cycling	New Zealand	Oceania
GLC	Global 6 Cycling	New Zealand	Oceania
NZP	MitoQ–NZ Cycling Project	New Zealand	Oceania
PCV	Panamá es Cultura y Valores	Panama	South America
MVC	~~Massi Vivo–Conecta~~ (Note: The team ceased operations on 31 March.)	Paraguay	South America
7RP	7 Eleven–Cliqq–air21 by Roadbike Philippines	Philippines	Asia
G4G	Go for Gold Philippines	Philippines	Asia
MSP	HRE Mazowsze Serce Polski	Poland	Europe
VOS	Voster ATS Team	Poland	Europe
CDF	ABTF–Feirense	Portugal	Europe
ATM	Atum General / Tavira / AP Maria Nova Hotel	Portugal	Europe
ALL	Aviludo–Louletano–Loulé Concelho	Portugal	Europe
EFL	Efapel Cycling	Portugal	Europe
GCT	Glassdrive–Q8–Anicolor	Portugal	Europe
KSU	Kelly / Simoldes / UDO	Portugal	Europe
LAA	LA Alumínios / Credibom / Marcos Car	Portugal	Europe
RPB	Rádio Popular–Paredes–Boavista	Portugal	Europe
TAV	Tavfer–Mortágua–Ovos Matinados	Portugal	Europe
W52	W52 / FC Porto	Portugal	Europe
GTS	Giotti Victoria–Savini Due	Romania	Europe
MEN	Mentorise Elite Team CFX	Romania	Europe
TNV	Team Novak	Romania	Europe
VZR	~~Vozrozhdenie~~	Russia	Europe
BIG	Benediction Ignite	Rwanda	Africa
MSR	May Stars Cycling	Rwanda	Africa
FCM	Ferei–CCN Metalac	Serbia	Europe
DKB	Dukla Banská Bystrica	Slovakia	Europe
ADR	Adria Mobil	Slovenia	Europe
CTK	Cycling Team Kranj	Slovenia	Europe
LGS	Ljubljana Gusto Santic	Slovenia	Europe
PRO	ProTouch	South Africa	Africa
GPC	Gapyeong Cycling Team	South Korea	Asia
GIC	Geumsan Insam Cello	South Korea	Asia
KSP	KSPO Professional	South Korea	Asia
KCT	Korail Cycling Team	South Korea	Asia
LXC	LX Cycling Team	South Korea	Asia
SCT	Seoul Cycling Team	South Korea	Asia
UCT	Uijeongbu Cycling Team	South Korea	Asia
MAN	Manuela Fundación	Spain	Europe
MSA	Motala AIF Serneke Allebike	Sweden	Europe
TUD	Tudor Pro Cycling Team	Switzerland	Europe
MPC	Meiyo CCN Pro Cycling	Taiwan	Asia
GTB	Grant Thornton–Bike Zone	Thailand	Asia
TCC	Thailand Continental Cycling Team	Thailand	Asia
SBB	Sakarya BB Pro Team	Turkey	Europe
STC	Spor Toto Cycling Team	Turkey	Europe
EGS	Eurocar GS Cycling Team	Ukraine	Europe
RWC	Ribble Weldtite	United Kingdom	Europe
SPC	Saint Piran	United Kingdom	Europe
RDW	WiV SunGod	United Kingdom	Europe
TRI	Trinity Racing	United Kingdom	Europe
EFD	EF Education–Nippo Development Team	United States	America
HBA	Hagens Berman Axeon	United States	America
ILU	Team Illuminate	United States	America
LLA	L39ION of Los Angeles	United States	America
TND	Team Novo Nordisk Development	United States	America
TSL	Team Skyline	United States	America
WGC	Wildlife Generation Pro Cycling	United States	America
TCM	Tashkent City Professional Cycling Team	Uzbekistan	Asia
JAV	Java Kiwi Atlántico	Venezuela	South America
STF	Start Cycling Team	Venezuela	South America

== Notes ==
Preceded by 2021	List of UCI ProTeams and Continental teams 2022	Succeeded by 2023
