= 2021 in Oceania =

List of events that happened during 2021 in Oceania.

== Sovereign states ==
=== Australia ===
(Australia)

- Chief of state: Queen Elizabeth II (since 1952)
- Governor-General – David Hurley (since 2019)
- Prime Minister – Scott Morrison (since 2018)

==== Christmas Island ====
(Christmas Island)

- Governor General of the Commonwealth of Australia: David Hurley (since 2019)
- Administrator: Natasha Griggs (since 2018)

==== Cocos (Keeling) Islands ====
(Cocos (Keeling) Islands)

- Governor General: David Hurley (since 2019)
- Administrator: Natasha Griggs (since 2018)

==== Norfolk Island ====
(Norfolk Island)

- Administrator: Eric Hutchinson (since 2017)

=== East Timor / Timor-Leste ===
(Timor-Leste)

- President of East Timor: Francisco Guterres (since 2017)
- Prime Minister: Taur Matan Ruak (since 2018)

=== Fiji ===
(Fiji)

- President of Fiji
  - George Konrote (until 12 November)
  - Ratu Wiliame Katonivere (starting 12 November)
- Head of Government: Frank Bainimarama (since 2007)
- Speaker: Epeli Nailatikau (since 2019)

=== Kiribati ===
(Kiribati)

- President: Taneti Mamau (since 2016)

=== Marshall Islands ===
(Marshall Islands)

- President: David Kabua (since 2020)
- Speaker of the legislature: Kenneth Kedi (since 2016)

=== Micronesia ===
(Federated States of Micronesia)

- President of the Federated States of Micronesia: David W. Panuelo (since 2019)
- Vice President of the Federated States of Micronesia: Yosiwo George (since 2015)

=== Nauru ===
(Nauru)

- President of Nauru: Lionel Aingimea (since 2019)
- Speaker of Parliament: Marcus Stephen (since 2019)

=== Palau ===
(Palau)

- President
  - Thomas Remengesau Jr. (until 21 January)
  - Surangel Whipps Jr. (starting 21 January)
- Vice President
  - Raynold Oilouch (until January 21)
  - Uduch Sengebau Senior (starting January 21)

=== Papua New Guinea ===
(Papua New Guinea)

- Monarchy of Papua New Guinea: Elizabeth II
- Governor-General: Bob Dadae (since 2017)
- Prime Minister: James Marape (since 2019)

=== Realm of New Zealand ===
The Realm of New Zealand consists of the sovereign state of New Zealand, the associated states of the Cook Islands and Niue, and the dependent territory of Tokelau. It also includes the Antarctica territorial claim of the Ross Dependency.

- Monarchy of New Zealand: Elizabeth II
- Governor-General of New Zealand:
  - Patsy Reddy (until 28 September)
  - Cindy Kiro (from 21 October)

==== New Zealand ====
- Speaker of the New Zealand House of Representatives: Trevor Mallard
- Prime Minister of New Zealand: Jacinda Ardern (since 2017)
- Deputy Prime Minister of New Zealand: Grant Robertson (since 2020)

==== Cook Islands ====
(Cook Islands)

- Queen's Representative: Tom Marsters (since 1973)
- Prime Minister of the Cook Islands: Mark Brown (since 2020)
- Speaker of the Cook Islands Parliament:
  - Niki Rattle (until 15 February)
  - Tai Tura (starting 22 March)

==== Niue ====
(Niue)

- Premier of Niue: Dalton Tagelagi (since 2020)

==== Tokelau ====
(Tokelau)

- Administrator of Tokelau: Ross Ardern (since 2018)
- Head of Government of Tokelau
  - Fofo Tuisano (until 8 March)
  - Kerisiano Kalolo (starting 8 March)

=== Samoa ===
(Samoa)

- Head of state: O le Ao o le Malo: Tuimalealiʻifano Vaʻaletoʻa Sualauvi II (since 2017)
- Prime Minister of Samoa
  - Tuilaʻepa Saʻilele Malielegaoi (until 24 May)
  - Fiamē Naomi Mataʻafa (starting 24 May)

=== Solomon Islands ===
(Solomon Islands)

- Governor-General: David Vunagi (since 2019)
- Prime Minister: Manasseh Sogavare (since 2019)

=== Tonga ===
(Tonga)

- Monarch: King Tupou VI (since 2012)
- Prime Minister
  - Pohiva Tuʻiʻonetoa (until 27 December)
  - Siaosi Sovaleni (starting 27 December)

=== Tuvalu ===
(Tuvalu)

- Head of State: Queen Elizabeth II
- Governor-General of Tuvalu:
  - Teniku Talesi Honolulu (until January)
  - Samuelu Teo (January–28 September)
  - Tofiga Vaevalu Falani (starting 28 September)
- Prime Minister of Tuvalu: Kausea Natano (since 2019)

=== Vanuatu ===
(Vanuatu)

- President of Vanuatu: Tallis Obed Moses (since 2017)
- Prime Minister of Vanuatu: Bob Loughman (since 2020)

== Dependencies ==
=== British Overseas Territories ===
(United Kingdom)

- Monarch: Queen Elizabeth II (since 1952)

==== Pitcairn Islands ====
(Pitcairn Islands)

- Governor (nonresident) of the Pitcairn Islands: Laura Clarke (since 2018)
- Mayor and Chairman of the Island Council: Charlene Warren-Peu (since 2020)

=== Chile ===
(Chile)

- President of Chile: Sebastián Piñera (since 2018)

==== Insular Chile ====
(Valparaíso Region)

- Intendant of Valparaíso Region: Jorge Martínez Durán
- Commune of the Juan Fernández Islands
  - Mayor: Felipe Paredes Vergara
- Province of Easter Island
- Governor
  - Laura Alarcón Rapu (until 29 April)
  - Rene de la Puente (starting 29 April)

=== France ===
(France)

- President of France: Emmanuel Macron (since 2017)
- Prime Minister of France: Jean Castex (since 2020)

==== French Polynesia ====
(French Polynesia)

- President of French Polynesia: Édouard Fritch (since 2014)
- High Commissioner of the Republic: Dominique Sorain (since 2019)
- President of the Assembly of French Polynesia: Gaston Tong Sang (since 2018)

==== New Caledonia ====
(New Caledonia)

- High Commissioner
  - Laurent Prevost (until 6 June)
  - Patrice Faure (starting 6 June)
- President of the Government
  - Thierry Santa (until 22 July)
  - Louis Mapou (starting 22 July)
- Vice President of the Government of New Caledonia
  - Gilbert Tyuienon (until 22 July)
  - Isabelle Champmoreau (starting 22 July)

==== Wallis and Futuna ====
(Wallis and Futuna)

- Administrator Superior of Wallis and Futuna: Hervé Jonathan (since January 11)
- President of the Territorial Assembly: Nivaleta Iloai (since 2020)
- There are three traditional kings with limited powers.

=== United States ===
(United States)

- President of the United States
  - Donald Trump (until January 20)
  - Joe Biden (starting January 20)
- Vice President of the United States
  - Mike Pence (until January 20)
  - Kamala Harris (starting January 20)

==== American Samoa ====
(American Samoa)

- Governor
  - Lolo Matalasi Moliga (until January 3)
  - Lemanu Peleti Mauga (since January 3)
- Lieutenant Governor
  - Lemanu Peleti Mauga (until 3 January)
  - Salo Ale (starting 3 January)

==== Guam ====
(Guam)

- Governor: Lou Leon Guerrero (since 2019)
- Lieutenant Governor: Josh Tenorio (since 2019)

==== Hawaii ====
(Hawaii)

- Governor of Hawaii: David Ige (since 2014)
- Lieutenant Governor of Hawaii: Josh Green (since 2018)

==== Northern Mariana Islands ====
(Northern Mariana Islands)

- Governor: Ralph Deleon Guerrero Torres (since 2015)
- Lieutenant Governor: Arnold Palacios (since 2019)

== Events ==
=== January and February ===
- January 1 – 2021 New Year Honours in the Commonwealth
- January 15 – Nazahat Shameen Khan of Fiji wins the presidency of the United Nations Human Rights Council (UNHRC).
- January 19 – Vanuatu detains Chinese fishing boats Dong Gang Xing 13 and Dong Gang Xing 16 plus a Russian yacht for operating illegally in its waters near Hiu Island.
- January 26 – Former president Xanana Gusmão of East Timor meets with Roman Catholic priest and self-proclaimed pedophile Richard Daschbach in Dili.
- February 4
  - Henry Puna of the Cook Islands is elected Secretary General of the Pacific Islands Forum Secretariat.
  - For the second time in 2021 and the third time in the last ten weeks, a ship reports losing containers due to rough weather in the South Pacific.
  - Pal Ahluwalia, Vice-Chancellor of the University of the South Pacific and his wife are deported from Fiji to Australia.
- February 10 – Tsunami alert after a 7.7 magnitude earthquake 415 kilometres (258 mi) east of Voh, New Caledonia. Waves between 30 centimeters and one meter high are reported in Fiji, New Zealand, and Vanuatu.
- February 16 – Australia is accused of "exporting its problems" by New Zealand Prime Minister Jacinda Ardern after cancelling the citizenship of a dual national Australian-New Zealander who joined the Islamic State in Syria (ISIS).

=== March and April ===
- March 2 – 2021 Micronesian parliamentary election
- March 3 – Simon Thompson, chairman of Rio Tinto mining corporation, resigns after a scandal resulting from the destruction of 46,000-year-old rock shelters at Juukan Gorge, Western Australia, in May 2020.
- March 4 – An earthquake of magnitude 7.3 strikes 178 kilometers (111 miles) northeast of the city of Gisborne, New Zealand, at a depth of 10 kilometers (six miles). No injuries or serious injuries are reported, but a tsunami warning is in place. Other large earthquakes were reported near Ohunua, ʻEua, Tonga (8.1) and one near Sola, Vanuatu (6.1).
- March 5 – Thirteen people are charged for workplace-related violations that took 22 lives in the 2019 Whakaari / White Island eruption in New Zealand.
- March 9
  - Admiral Philip S. Davidson, head of the United States Indo-Pacific Command testifies before the U.S. Senate Armed Services Committee needs an Aegis Ashore missile system to protect Guam and the United States from China. Davidson wants $27 billion, including $1.6 billion for the Aegis system.
  - Hawaii Governor David Ige (D) declares an emergency in all five counties after heavy rains bring floods, landslides and fear of dam failures.
- March 13 – 2021 Western Australian state election
- March 28 – President Surangel Whipps of Palau begins a four-day visit to Taiwan to promote tourism.

== Scheduled ==
=== Elections ===
- April 9 – 2021 Samoan general election
- November 2 – 2021 United States elections
- November – 2021 Tongan general election

=== Major national and territorial holidays ===
- January 23 – Bounty Day, Public holidays in the Pitcairn Islands
- January 26 – Australia Day
- February 8 – Waitangi Day celebrated, New Zealand.
- March 1 – Remembrance Day (Marshall Islands), Public holidays in the Marshall Islands
- March 6 – Norfolk Island Foundation Day
- April 6 – Self Determination Day, Public holidays in the Cocos (Keeling) Islands
- April 26 – Anzac Day celebrated, Public holidays in Australia and Public holidays in New Zealand
- June 1 – Independence Day (National Day), Public holidays in Samoa
- June 7 – Independence Day (National Day), Public holidays in the Solomon Islands
- June 12 – Queen's Official Birthday, Commonwealth countries
- June 29 – Autonomy Day, Public holidays in French Polynesia
- July 4/5 – Independence Day, United States′ territories and associated states
- July 12 – National Day, Public holidays in Kiribati
- July 14 – Bastille Day, French territories
- July 29 – Territory Day, Public holidays in Wallis and Futuna
- July 30 – Independence Day, Public holidays in Vanuatu
- October 4 – Tuvulu Day celebrated
- October 11 – Fiji Day celebrated, List of festivals in Fiji
- October 26 – Angam Day, Public holidays in Nauru
- November 3 – Independence Day, Public holidays in the Federated States of Micronesia
- November 4 – National Day celebrated, Tonga

== Sports ==
- January 13–23 — 2021 UCI Oceania Tour in New Zealand

== Deaths ==
- February 5 – Paul Tovua, 73, Solomon Islands politician, MP (since 1976), Speaker of the National Parliament of Solomon Islands (1994–2001).
- February 26 – Michael Somare, 84, first Prime Minister of Papua New Guinea (Father of the Nation); pancreatic cancer
- March 15 – Miriama Rauhihi Ness, New Zealand Māori activist and social worker.

== See also ==
- Tropical cyclones in 2021
  - 2020–21 Australian region cyclone season
  - 2021–22 Australian region cyclone season
  - 2021-22 South Pacific cyclone season
  - 2020–21 South Pacific cyclone season
- 2021 Pacific typhoon season
