= 2021 Adriatica Ionica Race =

Cycling race held in Italy

2021 UCI Europe Tour

Race details
- Dates: 15–17 June 2021
- Stages: 3
- Distance: 491.0 km (305.1 mi)
- Winning time: 11h 19' 56"

Results
Jersey awarded to the overall winner	Winner	Lorenzo Fortunato (ITA)	(Eolo–Kometa)
	Second	Merhawi Kudus (ERI)	(Astana–Premier Tech)
	Third	Vadim Pronskiy (KAZ)	(Astana–Premier Tech)
Jersey awarded to the points classification winner	Points	Elia Viviani (ITA)	(Italy)
Jersey awarded to the mountains classification winner	Mountains	Lorenzo Fortunato (ITA)	(Eolo–Kometa)
Jersey awarded to the young rider classification winner	Young rider	Vadim Pronskiy (KAZ)	(Astana–Premier Tech)
	Team	Bardiani–CSF–Faizanè	

The 2021 Adriatica Ionica Race/Sulle Rotte della Serenissima was a road cycling stage race that took place between 15 and 17 June 2021 in the northeastern Italy. It was the third edition of the Adriatica Ionica Race and a category 2.1 event on the 2021 UCI Europe Tour.

After the 2020 edition was cancelled due to the COVID-19 pandemic, the race made its return in 2021, though it was forced to downscale to three stages from the usual five.

== Teams ==
One UCI WorldTeam, six UCI ProTeams, seven UCI Continental teams, and two national teams made up the sixteen teams that participated in the race. With six riders each, Astana–Premier Tech and Cycling Team Friuli ASD were the only teams to not enter a full squad of seven riders. Of the 110 riders who started the race, 88 finished.

UCI WorldTeams

- Astana–Premier Tech

UCI ProTeams

- Androni Giocattoli–Sidermec
- Bardiani–CSF–Faizanè
- Eolo–Kometa
- Gazprom–RusVelo
- Team Novo Nordisk
- Vini Zabù

UCI Continental Teams

- Cycling Team Friuli ASD
- General Store–Fratelli Curia–Essegibi
- Iseo–Rime–Carnovali
- Team Colpack–Ballan
- Tirol KTM Cycling Team
- Work Service–Marchiol–Vega
- Zalf Euromobil Fior

National Teams

- Colombia
- Italy

== Route ==
The full race route details were revealed in a press conference on 10 June 2021.

Stage characteristics and winners
Stage	Date	Route	Distance	Type	Winner
1	15 June	Trieste to Aviano	185.3 km (115.1 mi)	Flat stage	Elia Viviani (ITA)
2	16 June	Vittorio Veneto to Cima Grappa	148.2 km (92.1 mi)	Mountain stage	Lorenzo Fortunato (ITA)
3	17 June	Ferrara to Comacchio	157.5 km (97.9 mi)	Flat stage	Elia Viviani (ITA)
Total			491.0 km (305.1 mi)		

== Stages ==
=== Stage 1 ===
15 June 2021 – Trieste to Aviano, 185.3 km (115.1 mi)

The first stage, in Friuli-Venezia Giulia, headed west from Trieste, with a slightly undulating route and one categorized climb on the way to Aviano.

Stage 1 Result
Rank	Rider	Team	Time
1	Elia Viviani (ITA)	Italy	4h 02' 02"
2	Davide Persico (ITA)	Team Colpack–Ballan	+ 0"
3	Luca Pacioni (ITA)	Eolo–Kometa	+ 0"
4	Jakub Mareczko (ITA)	Vini Zabù	+ 0"
5	Enrico Zanoncello (ITA)	Bardiani–CSF–Faizanè	+ 0"
6	Andrea D'Amato (ITA)	Iseo–Rime–Carnovali	+ 0"
7	Davide Boscaro (ITA)	Team Colpack–Ballan	+ 0"
8	Matteo Furlan (ITA)	Iseo–Rime–Carnovali	+ 0"
9	Davide Martinelli (ITA)	Astana–Premier Tech	+ 0"
10	Stefano Di Benedetto (ITA)	Work Service–Marchiol–Vega	+ 0"

General classification after Stage 1
Rank	Rider	Team	Time
1	Elia Viviani (ITA)	Italy	4h 01' 52"
2	Davide Persico (ITA)	Team Colpack–Ballan	+ 4"
3	Luca Pacioni (ITA)	Eolo–Kometa	+ 6"
4	Jakub Mareczko (ITA)	Vini Zabù	+ 10"
5	Enrico Zanoncello (ITA)	Bardiani–CSF–Faizanè	+ 10"
6	Andrea D'Amato (ITA)	Iseo–Rime–Carnovali	+ 10"
7	Davide Boscaro (ITA)	Team Colpack–Ballan	+ 10"
8	Matteo Furlan (ITA)	Iseo–Rime–Carnovali	+ 10"
9	Davide Martinelli (ITA)	Astana–Premier Tech	+ 10"
10	Stefano Di Benedetto (ITA)	Work Service–Marchiol–Vega	+ 10"

=== Stage 2 ===
16 June 2021 – Vittorio Veneto to Cima Grappa, 148.2 km (92.1 mi)

The second and queen stage sees the race continue heading west, from Vittorio Veneto in the Veneto region, with a summit finish atop the Cima Grappa at 1,712 metres (5,617 ft) above sea level.

Stage 2 Result
Rank	Rider	Team	Time
1	Lorenzo Fortunato (ITA)	Eolo–Kometa	3h 58' 38"
2	Merhawi Kudus (ERI)	Astana–Premier Tech	+ 1"
3	Vadim Pronskiy (KAZ)	Astana–Premier Tech	+ 3"
4	Giovanni Carboni (ITA)	Bardiani–CSF–Faizanè	+ 7"
5	Filippo Zana (ITA)	Bardiani–CSF–Faizanè	+ 35"
6	Alessandro Monaco (ITA)	Bardiani–CSF–Faizanè	+ 40"
7	Luca Covili (ITA)	Bardiani–CSF–Faizanè	+ 1' 07"
8	Eduardo Sepúlveda (ARG)	Androni Giocattoli–Sidermec	+ 1' 19"
9	Andrea Garosio (ITA)	Bardiani–CSF–Faizanè	+ 1' 27"
10	Davide Rebellin (ITA)	Work Service–Marchiol–Vega	+ 1' 32"

General classification after Stage 2
Rank	Rider	Team	Time
1	Lorenzo Fortunato (ITA)	Eolo–Kometa	8h 00' 30"
2	Merhawi Kudus (ERI)	Astana–Premier Tech	+ 5"
3	Vadim Pronskiy (KAZ)	Astana–Premier Tech	+ 9"
4	Giovanni Carboni (ITA)	Bardiani–CSF–Faizanè	+ 17"
5	Filippo Zana (ITA)	Bardiani–CSF–Faizanè	+ 45"
6	Alessandro Monaco (ITA)	Bardiani–CSF–Faizanè	+ 50"
7	Luca Covili (ITA)	Bardiani–CSF–Faizanè	+ 1' 17"
8	Eduardo Sepúlveda (ARG)	Androni Giocattoli–Sidermec	+ 1' 29"
9	Andrea Garosio (ITA)	Bardiani–CSF–Faizanè	+ 1' 37"
10	Davide Rebellin (ITA)	Work Service–Marchiol–Vega	+ 1' 42"

=== Stage 3 ===
17 June 2021 – Ferrara to Comacchio, 157.5 km (97.9 mi)

With the third and final stage, the race heads south into Emilia-Romagna: starting in Ferrara, riders will race towards the Adriatic coast and finish in Comacchio. Though this stage lacks much elevation gain, it does feature two laps of a 34-kilometre (21 mi) circuit in the second half of the stage that includes three sectors of dirt roads per lap.

Stage 3 Result
Rank	Rider	Team	Time
1	Elia Viviani (ITA)	Italy	3h 19' 23"
2	Jakub Mareczko (ITA)	Vini Zabù	+ 0"
3	Davide Martinelli (ITA)	Astana–Premier Tech	+ 0"
4	Enrico Zanoncello (ITA)	Bardiani–CSF–Faizanè	+ 0"
5	Marco Canola (ITA)	Gazprom–RusVelo	+ 0"
6	Giulio Masotto (ITA)	Zalf Euromobil Fior	+ 0"
7	Matevž Govekar (SLO)	Tirol KTM Cycling Team	+ 0"
8	Luca Pacioni (ITA)	Eolo–Kometa	+ 0"
9	Vadim Pronskiy (KAZ)	Astana–Premier Tech	+ 0"
10	Cristian Rocchetta (ITA)	General Store–Fratelli Curia–Essegibi	+ 0"

General classification after Stage 3
Rank	Rider	Team	Time
1	Lorenzo Fortunato (ITA)	Eolo–Kometa	11h 19' 56"
2	Merhawi Kudus (ERI)	Astana–Premier Tech	+ 2"
3	Vadim Pronskiy (KAZ)	Astana–Premier Tech	+ 6"
4	Giovanni Carboni (ITA)	Bardiani–CSF–Faizanè	+ 17"
5	Filippo Zana (ITA)	Bardiani–CSF–Faizanè	+ 42"
6	Alessandro Monaco (ITA)	Bardiani–CSF–Faizanè	+ 50"
7	Luca Covili (ITA)	Bardiani–CSF–Faizanè	+ 1' 17"
8	Eduardo Sepúlveda (ARG)	Androni Giocattoli–Sidermec	+ 1' 29"
9	Andrea Garosio (ITA)	Bardiani–CSF–Faizanè	+ 1' 34"
10	Davide Rebellin (ITA)	Work Service–Marchiol–Vega	+ 1' 42"

== Classification leadership table ==
Classification leadership by stage
Stage	Winner	General classification	Points classification	Mountains classification	Young rider classification	Team classification
1	Elia Viviani	Elia Viviani	Elia Viviani	Diego Pablo Sevilla	Davide Persico	Iseo–Rime–Carnovali
2	Lorenzo Fortunato	Lorenzo Fortunato	Elia Viviani	Lorenzo Fortunato	Vadim Pronskiy	Bardiani–CSF–Faizanè
3	Elia Viviani	Lorenzo Fortunato	Elia Viviani	Lorenzo Fortunato	Vadim Pronskiy	Bardiani–CSF–Faizanè
Final		Lorenzo Fortunato	Elia Viviani	Lorenzo Fortunato	Vadim Pronskiy	Bardiani–CSF–Faizanè

- On stage 2, Matteo Donegà, who was third in the points classification, wore the red jersey, because first placed Elia Viviani wore the blue jersey as the leader of the general classification and second placed Davide Persico wore the white jersey as the leader of the young rider classification.
- On stage 3, Merhawi Kudus, who was second in the mountains classification, wore the green jersey, because first placed Lorenzo Fortunato wore the blue jersey as the leader of the general classification.

== Final classification standings ==
Legend
Denotes the winner of the general classification	Denotes the winner of the mountains classification
Denotes the winner of the points classification	Denotes the winner of the young rider classification

=== General classification ===
Final general classification (1–10)
Rank	Rider	Team	Time
1	Lorenzo Fortunato (ITA)	Eolo–Kometa	11h 19' 56"
2	Merhawi Kudus (ERI)	Astana–Premier Tech	+ 2"
3	Vadim Pronskiy (KAZ)	Astana–Premier Tech	+ 6"
4	Giovanni Carboni (ITA)	Bardiani–CSF–Faizanè	+ 17"
5	Filippo Zana (ITA)	Bardiani–CSF–Faizanè	+ 42"
6	Alessandro Monaco (ITA)	Bardiani–CSF–Faizanè	+ 50"
7	Luca Covili (ITA)	Bardiani–CSF–Faizanè	+ 1' 17"
8	Eduardo Sepúlveda (ARG)	Androni Giocattoli–Sidermec	+ 1' 29"
9	Andrea Garosio (ITA)	Bardiani–CSF–Faizanè	+ 1' 34"
10	Davide Rebellin (ITA)	Work Service–Marchiol–Vega	+ 1' 42"

=== Points classification ===
Final points classification (1–10)
Rank	Rider	Team	Points
1	Elia Viviani (ITA)	Italy	56
2	Jakub Mareczko (ITA)	Vini Zabù	26
3	Riccardo Bobbo (ITA)	Work Service–Marchiol–Vega	22
4	Giacomo Garavaglia (ITA)	Work Service–Marchiol–Vega	19
5	Davide Persico (ITA)	Team Colpack–Ballan	18
6	Matteo Donegà (ITA)	Cycling Team Friuli ASD	16
7	Lorenzo Fortunato (ITA)	Eolo–Kometa	15
8	Luca Pacioni (ITA)	Eolo–Kometa	15
9	Matteo Zurlo (ITA)	Zalf Euromobil Fior	15
10	Davide Martinelli (ITA)	Astana–Premier Tech	14

=== Mountains classification ===
Final mountains classification (1–10)
Rank	Rider	Team	Points
1	Lorenzo Fortunato (ITA)	Eolo–Kometa	10
2	Merhawi Kudus (ERI)	Astana–Premier Tech	8
3	Vadim Pronskiy (KAZ)	Astana–Premier Tech	6
4	Diego Pablo Sevilla (ESP)	Eolo–Kometa	5
5	Giovanni Carboni (ITA)	Bardiani–CSF–Faizanè	4
6	Matteo Donegà (ITA)	Cycling Team Friuli ASD	3
7	Filippo Zana (ITA)	Bardiani–CSF–Faizanè	2
8	Mattia Bais (ITA)	Androni Giocattoli–Sidermec	2
9	Riccardo Verza (ITA)	Zalf Euromobil Fior	1
10	Leslie Lührs (GER)	Tirol KTM Cycling Team	1

=== Young rider classification ===
Final young rider classification (1–10)
Rank	Rider	Team	Time
1	Vadim Pronskiy (KAZ)	Astana–Premier Tech	11h 20' 02"
2	Filippo Zana (ITA)	Bardiani–CSF–Faizanè	+ 36"
3	Alessandro Monaco (ITA)	Bardiani–CSF–Faizanè	+ 44"
4	Florian Lipowitz (GER)	Tirol KTM Cycling Team	+ 2' 07"
5	Didier Merchán (COL)	Colombia	+ 2' 47"
6	Alejandro Ropero (ESP)	Eolo–Kometa	+ 3' 38"
7	Natnael Tesfatsion (ERI)	Androni Giocattoli–Sidermec	+ 3' 44"
8	Daniel Muñoz (COL)	Androni Giocattoli–Sidermec	+ 4' 20"
9	Andrii Ponomar (UKR)	Androni Giocattoli–Sidermec	+ 5' 20"
10	Jesús David Peña (COL)	Colombia	+ 6' 05"

=== Team classification ===
Final team classification (1–10)
Rank	Team	Time
1	Bardiani–CSF–Faizanè	34h 01' 31"
2	Androni Giocattoli–Sidermec	+ 5' 41"
3	Eolo–Kometa	+ 12' 37"
4	Colombia	+ 13' 32"
5	Gazprom–RusVelo	+ 14' 50"
6	Astana–Premier Tech	+ 22' 27"
7	General Store–Fratelli Curia–Essegibi	+ 28' 47"
8	Zalf Euromobil Fior	+ 30' 13"
9	Vini Zabù	+ 34' 08"
10	Work Service–Marchiol–Vega	+ 35' 09"
