= Park Sung-baek =

South Korean cyclist

Personal information
- Born: 27 February 1985 (age 41) Seoul, South Korea
- Height: 1.75 m (5 ft 9 in)
- Weight: 73 kg (161 lb)

Korean name
- Hangul: 박성백
- Hanja: 朴晟伯
- RR: Bak Seongbaek
- MR: Pak Sŏngbaek

Sport
- Cycling career
- Full name: Park Sung-baek
- Height: 1.72 m (5 ft 8 in)
- Weight: 68 kg (150 lb)
- Sport: Cycling
- Current team: Gapyeong Cycling Team
- Disciplines: Road; Track
- Role: Rider
- Rider type: Sprinter

Professional teams
- 2005: Giant Asia Racing Team
- 2008: Seoul Cycling Team
- 2009: EQA–Meitan Hompo–Graphite Design
- 2010–2018: KSPO
- 2019: UijeongBu Cycling Team
- 2020–: Gapyeong Cycling Team

Park Sung-baek (Korean: 박성백; Hanja: 朴晟伯; Korean pronunciation: [pak̚.s͈ʌŋ.bɛk̚]; born 27 February 1985) is a South Korean road bicycle racer, who currently rides for UCI Continental team Gapyeong Cycling Team. He competed at the 2012 Summer Olympics in the Men's road race, but failed to finish.

== Major results ==
2003
9th Overall Tour de Korea
2004
4th Overall Tour de Korea
5th Overall Tour de Hokkaido

1st Points classification
1st Stages 4 & 5

2005
Asian Cycling Championships

1st Team pursuit
1st Elimination race
5th Road race

1st Stage 4 Tour of Siam
1st Stage 1 Tour de Korea
2006
Asian Games

1st Team pursuit
1st Madison
3rd Road race

Asian Track Championships

1st Team pursuit
1st Madison

Tour of Thailand

1st Stages 2 & 6

6th Overall Tour de Korea
2007
1st Road race, National Road Championships
1st Overall Tour de Korea

1st Stages 1, 3, 5, 7 & 9

Tour of Hong Kong Shanghai

1st Points classification
1st Stage 1

Tour de East Java

1st Points classification
1st Stages 4 & 5

2008
1st Road race, National Road Championships
9th Overall Tour de Taiwan
2009
5th Overall Tour de Korea
2010
Tour de Hokkaido

1st Stages 1 & 4

5th Overall Tour de Singkarak

1st Stage 2

2011
Asian Track Championships

1st Team pursuit
1st Points race

1st Stage 2 Tour de Taiwan
3rd Team time trial, Summer Universiade
2012
1st Team pursuit, Asian Track Championships
1st Overall Tour de Korea

1st Mountains classification
1st Stage 6

2013
1st Team pursuit, Asian Track Championships
1st Stage 2 Tour of Japan
2nd Road race, National Road Championships
2014
1st Stage 8 Tour de Korea
1st Points classification Tour de Filipinas
4th Road race, National Road Championships
2015
Tour of Thailand

1st Stages 5 & 6

3rd Time trial, National Road Championships
2016
Jelajah Malaysia

1st Points classification
1st Stage 5

2018
5th Time trial, National Road Championships
2019
5th Time trial, National Road Championships
