= Ethan Ogrodniczuk =

Canadian track cyclist

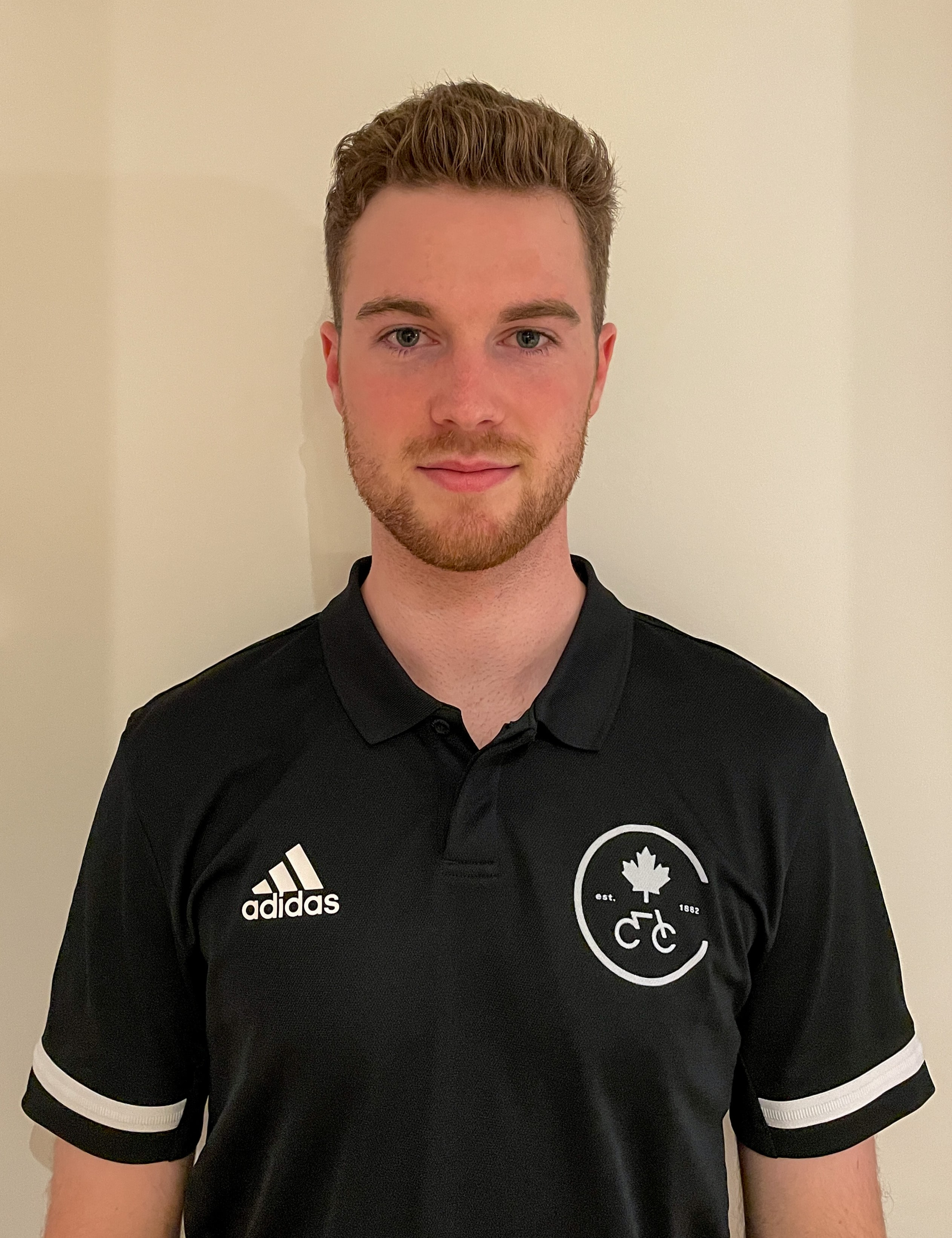
- Ogrodniczuk in 2022

Personal information
- Born: 19 April 2001 (age 25) Vancouver, British Columbia
- Height: 186 cm (6 ft 1 in)
- Weight: 75 kg (165 lb)

Cycling career
- Sport: Cycling
- Discipline: Track
- Role: Rider
- Rider type: Endurance
Medal record
Representing Canada
Men's track cycling
UCI Track Cycling Nations Cup
Silver medal – second place	2021 Cali, Colombia	Team pursuit

Ethan Ogrodniczuk (born 19 April 2001) is a Canadian track cyclist who currently rides for the Canadian National Team. He rode in the men's team pursuit event alongside Michael Foley, Jackson Kinniburgh & Derek Gee at the 2021 UCI Track Cycling World Championships in Roubaix, France, where the team placed 9th.

== Education ==
He attends the University of British Columbia for International Relations & Economics.

== Major results ==
=== Track ===
2016
National U17 Championships

1st Team Sprint (with Riley Pickrell & Tyler Davies)

2017
National U17 Championships

1st Team Sprint (with Riley Pickrell & Tyler Davies)

2018
National Junior Championships

1st Scratch Race
1st Madison (with Riley Pickrell)
1st Team Sprint (with Riley Pickrell & Tyler Davies)
2nd 1km Time Trial

2019
National Junior Championships

1st Team Pursuit (with Riley Pickrell, Jacob Rubuliak & Sean Richardson)
2nd Madison (with Riley Pickrell)
3rd 1km Time Trial

National Elite Championships

2nd Madison (with John Wilcox)

2021
UCI Track Cycling Nations Cup

2nd Team Pursuit, Cali (with Michael Foley, Jackson Kinniburgh, Sean Richardson & Mathias Guillemette)
6th Madison (with Jackson Kinniburgh)
7th 1km Time Trial

UCI Track Cycling World Championships

9th Team Pursuit (with Michael Foley, Jackson Kinniburgh & Derek Gee)
