= Jacob Tipper =

British cyclist (born 1991)

Personal information
- Full name: Jacob Daniel Tipper
- Born: 2 December 1991 (age 34) Dudley, England
- Height: 181 cm (5 ft 11 in)
- Weight: 86 kg (190 lb)

Cycling career
- Sport: Cycling
- Current team: Ribble Weldtite
- Discipline: Road
- Role: Rider
- Rider type: Sprinter

Amateur teams
- 2014: KTM road-and-trail.com
- 2015: Neon Velo
- 2017: Brother DriverPlan NRG

Professional teams
- 2016: Pedal Heaven
- 2018: Memil–CCN Pro Cycling
- 2019–: Ribble Pro Cycling

Jacob Daniel Tipper (born 2 December 1991) is a British cyclist, who last rode for UCI Continental team Ribble Weldtite.

== Coaching ==
Founder of Jacob Tipper Performance Coaching. Coach to World Tour cyclists and pro triatheletes, including: Ben Healy and Lucy Byam. Under this role, Jacob orchestrated strategy for Joe Skipper in the Sub7 triathlon event at the DEKRAring in Germany, which led to the fastest ever Ironman bike leg of 3:16. Jacob also coached Dan Bigham to the World Hour Record of 55.548 km in 2022

== Major results ==
2015
5th Overall Tour of Al Zubarah

1st Prologue

6th Overall Sharjah International Cycling Tour
2017
1st Team pursuit, National Track Championships (with Daniel Bigham, Charlie Tanfield and Jonathan Wale)
2nd GP Oued Eddahab, Les Challenges de la Marche Verte
9th Trophée de la Maison Royale, Challenge du Prince
2018
1st Stage 6 Tour du Maroc
1st Stage 11 Tour of Qinghai Lake
2nd Team pursuit, National Track Championships
