= Alessandro Monaco =

Italian cyclist

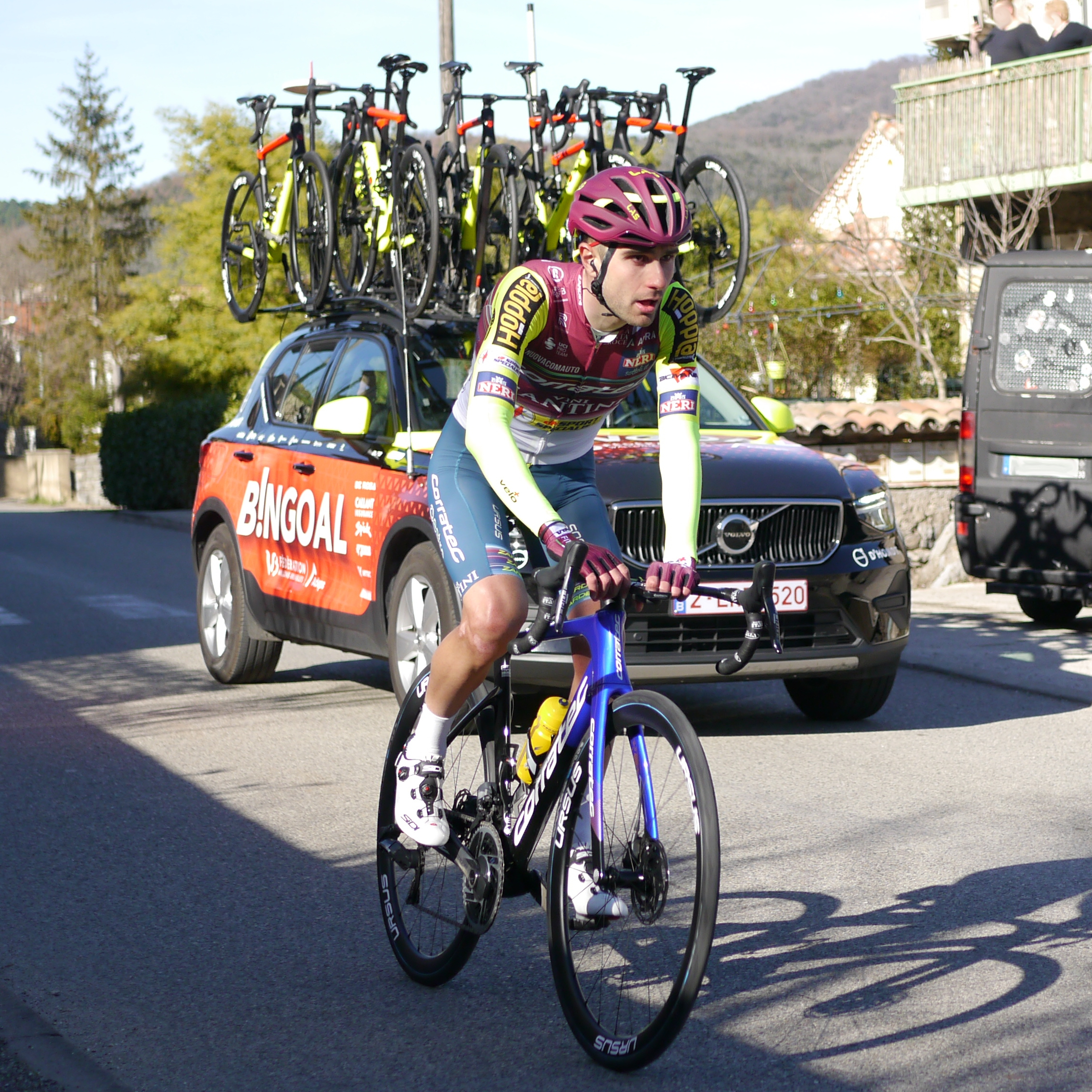
- Monaco during the 2024 Étoile de Bessèges

Personal information
- Born: 4 February 1998 (age 28) San Pietro Vernotico, Italy

Cycling career
- Sport: Cycling
- Current team: Retired
- Discipline: Road
- Role: Rider

Amateur teams
- 2011: Ciclistico Grottaglie
- 2012: Giovanile Franco Ballerini Bari
- 2013–2014: Ciclistico Grottaglie
- 2015–2016: Autotrasporti Convertini Domenico
- 2017–2018: Hopplà–Petroli Firenze
- 2019: Casillo–Maserati

Professional teams
- 2020–2021: Bardiani–CSF–Faizanè
- 2022: Giotti Victoria–Savini Due
- 2023: Team Technipes #inEmiliaRomagna
- 2024: Team Corratec–Vini Fantini

Alessandro Monaco (born 4 February 1998) is an Italian racing cyclist, who last rode for UCI ProTeam Team Corratec–Vini Fantini.

== Major results ==
2015
7th Trofeo Citta di Loano
2016
1st Overall Tre Giorni Orobica

1st Stage 3

3rd Trofeo Citta di Loano
4th Overall Giro della Lunigiana
2018
6th Overall Toscana-Terra di Ciclismo
8th Overall Giro della Valle d'Aosta
2019
8th Overall Grand Prix Priessnitz spa
8th G.P. Palio del Recioto
10th GP Capodarco
10th Gran Premio Sportivi di Poggiana
2021
6th Overall Adriatica Ionica Race
2022
5th Grand Prix Alanya
2023
7th Overall Istrian Spring Trophy
8th Overall Aziz Shusha

1st Stage 4

2024
7th Overall Tour de Taiwan
