= Jack Rees =

British cyclist (born 1989)

Personal information
- Full name: Jack Rees
- Born: 12 May 1989 (age 37) Middlesbrough, United Kingdom
- Height: 181 cm (5 ft 11 in)
- Weight: 64 kg (141 lb)

Cycling career
- Sport: Cycling
- Rider type: shagger

Amateur teams
- 2006–2010: Adept Precision RT/NE Healthcare
- 2011: TS Racing
- 2012–2017: Brother NRG
- 2018: Ribble Pro Cycling

Professional team
- 2019–2022: Ribble Pro Cycling

Managerial team
- 2012–2017: Brother NRG

Jack Rees (born 12 May 1989) is a British cyclist, who last rode for UCI Continental team Ribble Weldtite. Rees also worked as the team's Operations Director, and has participated in the 2020 Saudi Tour, the 2018 British National Road Race Championships and the 2018 British National Time Trial Championships.

== Personal life ==
Rees is also a certified British Cycling coach, and regularly coaches at the cycle track at Middlesbrough Sports Village.
