= Sean McKenna (cyclist) =

Irish cyclist

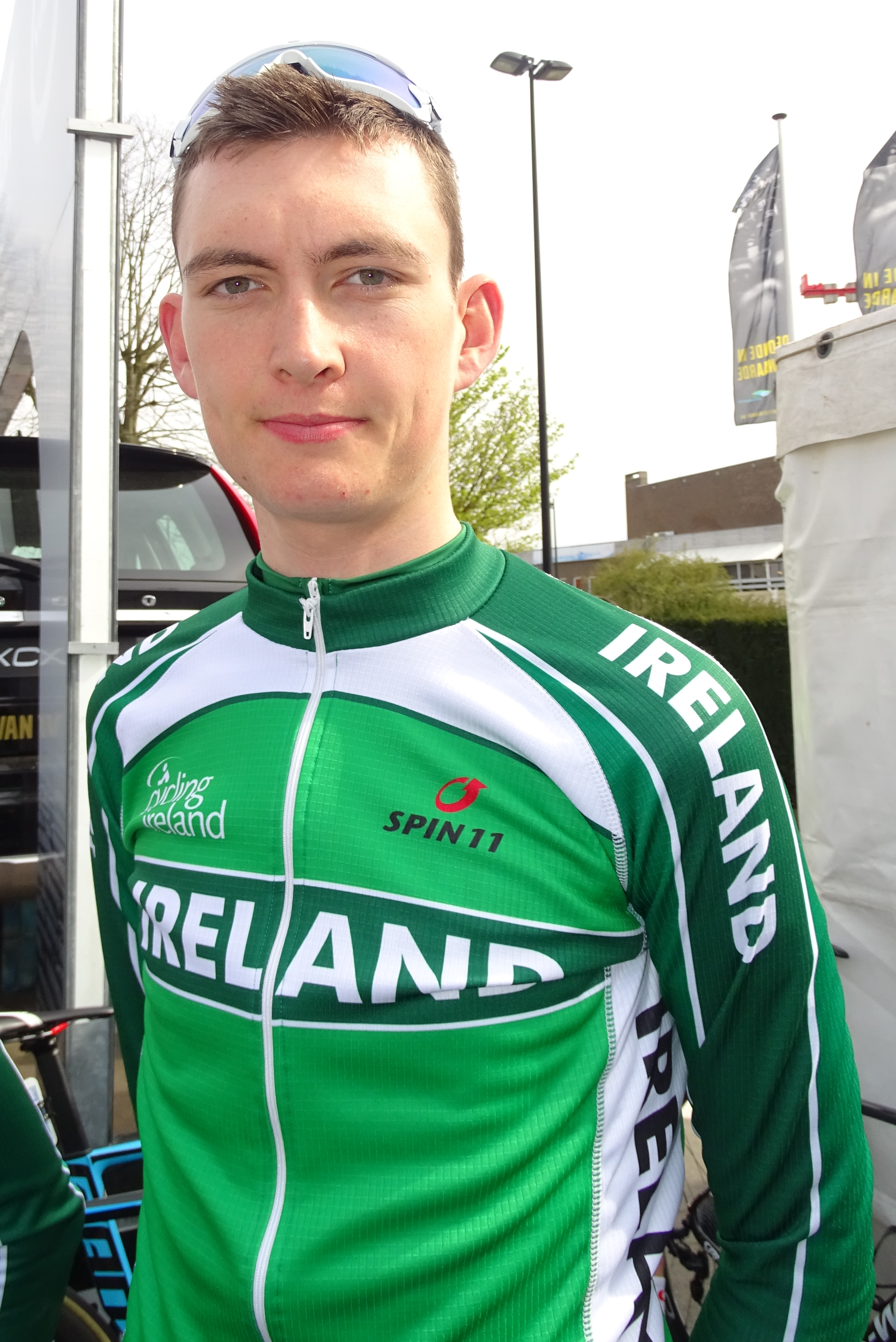

Personal information
- Born: 8 March 1994 (age 32) Dublin, Ireland

Cycling career
- Sport: Cycling
- Current team: Dan Morrissey–MIG.ie–Pactimo
- Discipline: Road
- Role: Rider

Amateur teams
- 2016: An Post–Chain Reaction (stagiaire)
- 2019–: Dan Morrissey–MIG.ie–Pactimo

Professional teams
- 2017: An Post–Chain Reaction
- 2018: Holdsworth

Sean McKenna (born 8 March 1994 in Dublin) is an Irish cyclist riding for Dan Morrissey–MIG.ie–Pactimo. He was selected to ride for Team Holdsworth Pro Cycling at the 2018 Tour de Yorkshire.

== Major results ==
2017
5th Road race, National Road Championships
2018
1st Stage 6 Rás Tailteann
