= Finn Crockett =

Irish cyclist (born 1999)

Personal information
- Born: 30 June 1999 (age 27) Strathpeffer, Scotland
- Height: 1.83 m (6 ft 0 in)

Cycling career
- Sport: Cycling
- Current team: VolkerWessels Cycling Team
- Discipline: Road
- Role: Rider

Amateur teams
- 2017: Spokes BCP Racing
- 2018–2021: Wheelbase CabTech Castelli
- 2023: Spokes Racing Team

Professional teams
- 2022: Ribble Weldtite
- 2023: AT85 Pro Cycling
- 2023: Saint Piran
- 2024–: VolkerWessels Cycling Team
Medal record
Representing Scotland
Men's road bicycle racing
Commonwealth Games
| Bronze medal – third place | 2022 Birmingham | Road race |

Finn Crockett (born 30 June 1999) is a Scottish-born Irish cyclist who currently rides for UCI Continental team VolkerWessels Cycling Team. He raced as Scottish and British before switching his allegiance to Ireland in 2024, and won the bronze medal in the road race competing for Scotland at the 2022 Commonwealth Games.

Crockett has three professional cycling victories, all achieved on the UCI Europe Tour. His first victory came at the one-day Rutland–Melton CiCLE Classic in 2022 riding for Ribble Weldtite. His other victories both came on stage races, taking stage five at the 2023 Rás Tailteann for Irish amateur team Foyle CC and stage one at the 2024 Tour de la Mirabelle for VolkerWessels Cycling Team.

== Major results ==
2022
1st Rutland–Melton CiCLE Classic
3rd Road race, Commonwealth Games
Tour Series

3rd Galashiels
3rd Sunderland

3rd Lincoln Grand Prix
9th Overall Tour du Loir-et-Cher
2023
1st Overall Rás Mumhan

1st Points classification
1st Stage 2

1st Beaumont Trophy
National Circuit Series

1st Sheffield

1st Stage 5 Rás Tailteann
10th Midden–Brabant Poort Omloop
2024
1st Stage 1 Tour de la Mirabelle
5th Road race, Irish National Road Championships
2025
1st Overall Kreiz Breizh Elites
National Circuit Series

2nd Ilkley
3rd Otley
