= Conn McDunphy =

Irish cyclist

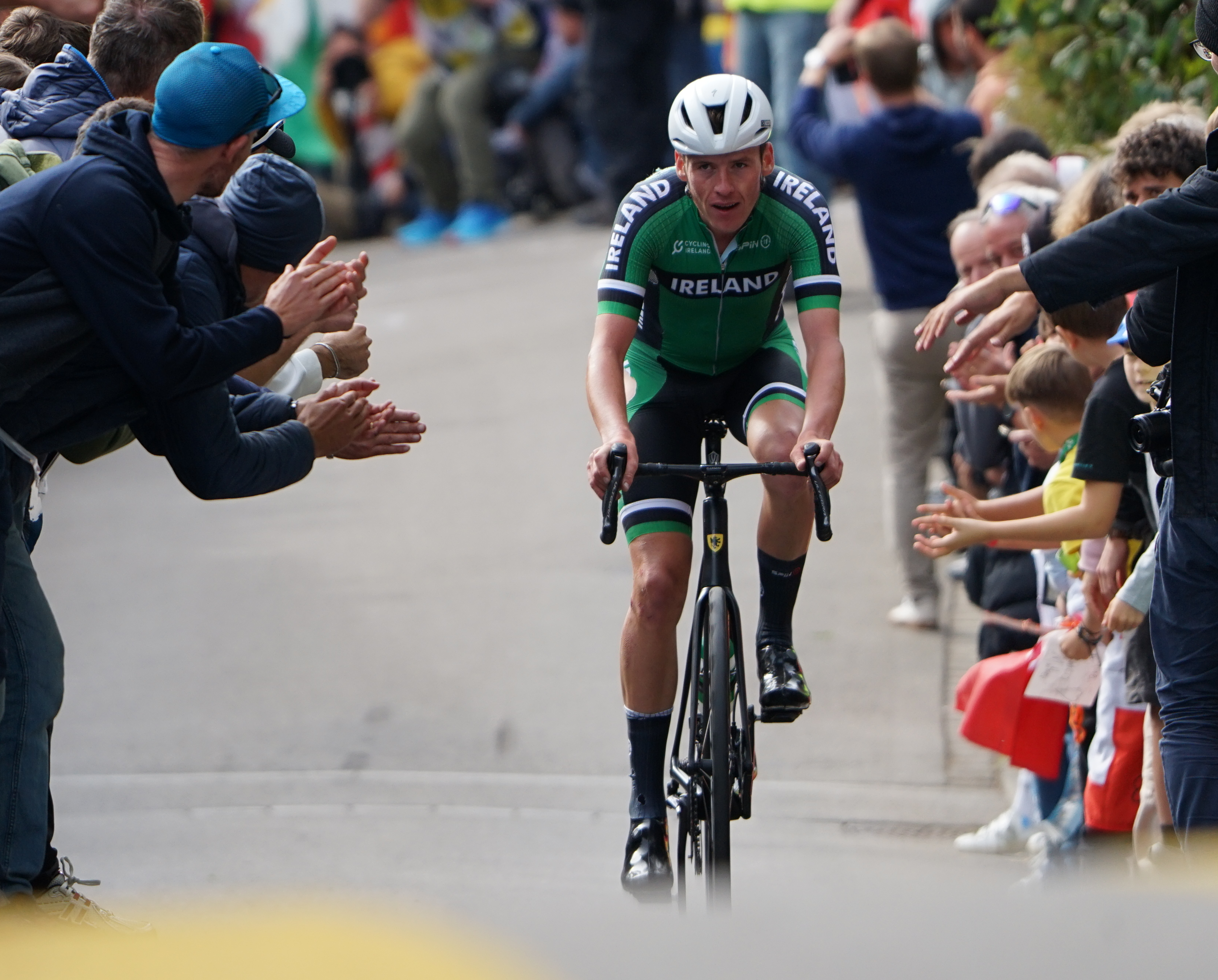
- Conn McDunphy during the 2024 World Championships

Personal information
- Born: 3 February 1997 (age 29) Kilcock, Ireland
- Height: 1.85 m (6 ft 1 in)
- Weight: 70 kg (154 lb)

Cycling career
- Sport: Cycling
- Current team: APS Pro Cycling by Team Cadence Cyclery
- Discipline: Road
- Role: Rider

Amateur teams
- 2017–2019: Lucan CRC
- 2019–2021: CC Nogent-sur-Oise
- 2023: SoCalCycling.com Team

Professional teams
- 2017: Team Raleigh–GAC
- 2018: Holdsworth
- 2021–2022: EvoPro Racing
- 2024–2025: Team Skyline
- 2026–: APS Pro Cycling by Team Cadence Cyclery

Conn McDunphy (born 3 February 1997) is an Irish cyclist, who currently rides for UCI Continental team APS Pro Cycling by Team Cadence Cyclery.

== Major results ==
2017
2nd Time trial, National Under-23 Road Championships
5th Time trial, National Road Championships
2018
1st Stage 1 Tour of Ulster
2nd Time trial, National Under-23 Road Championships
2019
8th Chrono Champenois
2020
1st Time trial, National Road Championships
2021
3rd Road race, National Road Championships
2022
8th PWZ Zuidenveld Tour
2023
1st Hill-climb, National Road Championships
1st Shay Elliott Memorial Race
1st Stephen Roche Grand Prix
1st Bobby Power Memorial
1st Sean Nolan Meath Grand Prix
1st John Drumm Cup
1st Sliabh Luachra Clasaicí
2024
1st Stephen Roche Grand Prix
2nd Overall Rás Tailteann

1st Stage 2

9th Overall Tour of Szeklerland

1st Stage 2

2025
1st Overall Rás Mhaigh Eo

1st Stages 1 & 2

1st Stage 2 Tour de Beauce
2026
1st Overall Rás Tailteann
