= Sean Christian =

American cyclist

Personal information
- Born: April 20, 2002 (age 24) Minneapolis, Minnesota, United States
- Height: 1.86 m (6 ft 1 in)

Cycling career
- Sport: Cycling
- Current team: Modern Adventure Pro Cycling
- Discipline: Road
- Role: Rider

Amateur teams
- 2019–2020: Debondt Verandas
- 2021–2022: Cinch Cycling
- 2023–2024: Aevolo

Professional teams
- 2025: Team Skyline
- 2026–: Modern Adventure Pro Cycling

Sean Christian (born April 20, 2002) is an American racing cyclist, who currently rides for UCI ProTeam Modern Adventure Pro Cycling.

== Major results ==
2022
1st El Tour de Tucson
1st Historic Riverton Criterium
1st Stage 4 Green Mountain Stage Race
4th Road race, National Under-23 Road Championships
2023
2nd El Tour de Tucson
9th International Rhodes Grand Prix
2024
4th Road race, National Under-23 Road Championships
2025
1st Gran Premio New York City
1st Stage 1 Tour de Beauce
