= 2022 UCI Oceania Tour =

Oceania cycling circuit 2022

- Eighteenth edition of the UCI Oceania Tour

Details
- Dates: 5 January – 9 January
- Location: New Zealand and Australia
- Races: 2

The 2022 UCI Oceania Tour was the 18th season of the UCI Oceania Tour.

The UCI ratings from highest to lowest were as follows:

- Multi-day events: 2.1 and 2.2
- One-day events: 1.1 and 1.2

== Events ==
Races in the 2022 UCI Oceania Tour
Race	Rating	Date	Winner	Team
New Zealand Cycle Classic	2.2	5–9 January	Mark Stewart (GBR)	Bolton Equities Black Spoke Pro Cycling
(Australia) Bay Classic Series	CRT - Criterium	8–9 January	Blake Quick (AUS)	InForm TMX MAKE
