= Jackson Kinniburgh =

Canadian racing cyclist

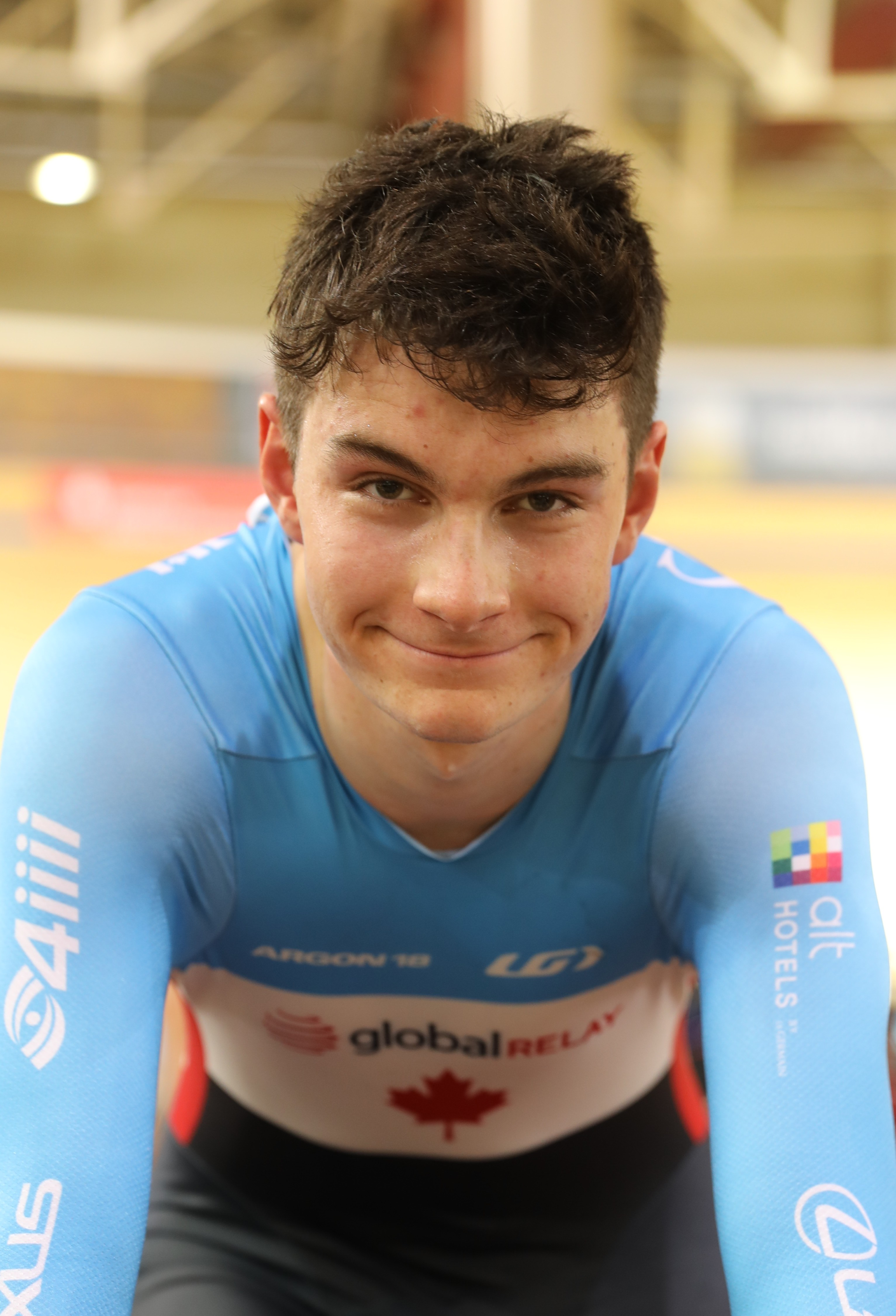
- Kinniburgh in 2019

Personal information
- Born: February 24, 2001 (age 25) Calgary, Alberta, Canada
- Height: 189 cm (6 ft 2 in)
- Weight: 76 kg (168 lb)

Cycling career
- Sport: Cycling
- Discipline: Track
- Role: Rider

Professional team
- 2020: DC Bank/Probaclac

Jackson Kinniburgh (born February 24, 2001) is a Canadian racing cyclist. In 2021, he represented Canada at the UCI Track Cycling World Championships in the men's team pursuit event.

== Major results ==
2018
National Junior Championships

1st Points race
2nd Scratch

2019
2nd Team pursuit, National Championships
2020
3rd Team pursuit, Milton, 2019–20 UCI World Cup
2021
2nd Team pursuit, Cali, UCI Nations Cup
