= Public holidays in French Polynesia =

This is a list of public holidays in French Polynesia.

Date	Name in English	Name in French	Remarks
January 1	New Year's Day	Jour de l'An	
March 5	Missionary Day	Arrivée de l'Evangile	
movable holiday	Good Friday	Vendredi Saint	
movable holiday	Easter Sunday	Pâques	
movable holiday	Easter Monday	Lundi de Pâques	
May 1	Labour Day	Fête du Travail	
May 8	Victory Day	Fête de la Victoire	
movable holiday	Ascension Day	Ascension	
movable holiday	Whit Sunday	Pentecôte	
movable holiday	Whit Monday	Lundi de Pentecôte	
July 14	National Day	Fête Nationale	
August 15	Assumption Day	Assomption	
November 1	All Saints' Day	Toussaint	
November 11	Armistice Day	Armistice	
November 20	Matari'i	Matari'i	
December 25	Christmas Day	Noël	
