= 2021 UCI Asia Tour =

- Twenty-first edition of the UCI Asia Tour

Details
- Dates: 28 May – 10 October 2021
- Location: Asia
- Races: 4

The 2021 UCI Asia Tour was the 17th season of the UCI Asia Tour. The season began on 28 May with the Tour of Japan and ended on 10 October 2021.

The points leader, based on the cumulative results of previous races, wears the UCI Asia Tour cycling jersey.

Throughout the season, points are awarded to the top finishers of stages within stage races and the final general classification standings of each of the stages races and one-day events. The quality and complexity of a race also determines how many points are awarded to the top finishers, the higher the UCI rating of a race, the more points are awarded.

The UCI ratings from highest to lowest are as follows:

- Multi-day events: 2.Pro, 2.1 and 2.2
- One-day events: 1.Pro, 1.1 and 1.2

== Events ==
Races in the 2021 UCI Asia Tour
Race	Rating	Date	Winner	Team
Tour of Japan	2.2	28–30 May	Nariyuki Masuda (JPN)	Utsunomiya Blitzen
(China) Tour of Qinghai Lake	2.2	11–18 Jul	Zhang Zhishan (CHN)	Tianyoude Hotel Cycling Team
(Japan) Oita Urban Classic	1.2	10 Oct	Francisco Mancebo (ESP)	Matrix Powertag
