= Public holidays in the Cocos (Keeling) Islands =

This is a list of public holidays in the Cocos (Keeling) Islands.

== Public holidays ==
Date	Name
1 January	New Year's Day
26 January	Australia Day
Varies according to the Christian calendar	Good Friday
Varies according to the Christian calendar	Easter Monday
6 April	Self Determination Day
25 April	Anzac Day
6 June	King's Birthday
Varies according to the Islamic calendar	Hari Raya Puasa
Varies according to the Islamic calendar	Hari Raya Haji
Varies according to the Islamic calendar	Islamic New Year
Varies according to the Islamic calendar	Hari Maulaud Nabi
25 December	Christmas Day
26 December	Boxing Day

== See also ==
- Public holidays in Australia
