= Holdsworth (cycling team) =

Team information
- UCI code: HOL
- Registered: Ireland
- Founded: 2018
- Disbanded: 2018
- Discipline: Road
- Status: UCI Continental (2018)

Key personnel
- General manager: Dean Downing

Team name history
- 2018: Holdsworth

Holdsworth was a UCI Continental team founded in 2018. Although the team is British-based, with its headquarters in Rotherham, Yorkshire, it is Irish-registered. The founding of the team marked the return of the bicycle brand to competition after a 40 year absence, with the Holdsworth name being revived by Planet X founder Dave Loughran. In 2017, the team announced their intention to race in the 2018 Tour de Yorkshire: their place was confirmed in March 2018.

== Team roster ==
Rider	Date of birth
Russell Downing (GBR)	23 August 1978 (age 48)
Seid Lizde (ITA)	8 July 1995 (age 31)
Leon Mazzone (GBR)	13 December 1996 (age 29)
Tom Mazzone (GBR)	9 July 1993 (age 33)
Byran Mccrystal (IRE)	20 January 1981 (age 45)
Conn Mcdunphy (IRE)	3 February 1997 (age 29)
Sean Mckenna (IRE)	8 March 1994 (age 32)

Rider	Date of birth
Damien Shaw (IRE)	10 July 1984 (age 42)
Bjorn Thurau (GER)	23 July 1988 (age 38)
Dermot Trulock (IRE)	7 November 1997 (age 28)
Mattia Viel (ITA)	22 April 1995 (age 31)
Jake Womersley (GBR)	12 December 1995 (age 30)
Nicholas Yallouris (AUS)	24 February 1994 (age 32)

== Major results ==
2018
Stage 6 Rás Tailteann, Sean McKenna
