= DC Bank/Probaclac =

Canadian cycling team

Team information
- UCI code: EKG (2012); EKD (2013); PCD (2018–2019); DCP (2020–)
- Registered: Canada
- Founded: 2012
- Discipline: Road
- Status: UCI Continental (2012–2013, 2018–present); Amateur (2014–2017)

Team name history
- 2012; 2013; 2014–2017; 2018–2019; 2020–: Ekoï.com–Gaspésien (EKG); Ekoï.com–Devinci (EKD); Transports Lacombe/Devinci; Probaclac/Devinci (PCD); DC Bank/Probaclac (DCP)

DC Bank/Probaclac is a Canadian UCI Continental cycling team established in 2012.

== Team roster ==
As of 19 March 2020.

Rider	Date of birth
Mark Bonar (CAN)	18 November 1992 (age 33)
Lukas Conly (CAN)	24 May 1997 (age 29)
Nicolas Côté (CAN)	1 August 1996 (age 30)
Emmett Culp (CAN)	10 June 1993 (age 33)
Simon Dubuc (CAN)	11 April 2000 (age 26)
Chris Ernst (CAN)	31 August 1999 (age 27)
Anthony Ferrari (CAN)	9 June 1989 (age 37)

Rider	Date of birth
Matt Kamermans (CAN)	13 April 1996 (age 30)
Jackson Kinniburgh (CAN)	24 February 2001 (age 25)
Christian Ricci (CAN)	11 June 1996 (age 30)
Connor Toppings (CAN)	11 February 1996 (age 30)
Marcus van der Sande (CAN)	10 February 1996 (age 30)
Alexander Webb (CAN)	22 January 2001 (age 25)
Adam Wolfe (CAN)	26 June 1999 (age 27)
