= Kunbao Sport Continental Cycling Team =

Chinese cycling team

Team information
- UCI code: KBS
- Registered: China
- Founded: 2019
- Discipline: Road
- Status: UCI Continental (2019–)
- Bicycles: Laminar

Team name history
- 2019–: Kunbao Sport Continental Cycling Team

Kunbao Sport Continental Cycling Team (UCI team code: KBS) is a UCI Continental team founded in 2019 that is based in Inner Mongolia, China.

== Team roster ==
As of 9 April 2020.

Rider	Date of birth
Chen Xin (CHN)	13 July 2000 (age 26)
Gao Hongyu (CHN)	7 February 2001 (age 25)
Huang Jianye (CHN)	7 March 2000 (age 26)
Jia Weihui (CHN)	17 February 1997 (age 29)
Li Jiayuan (CHN)	7 September 1998 (age 27)

Rider	Date of birth
Wang Bing (CHN)	3 January 2001 (age 25)
Xue Guanhua (CHN)	2 May 1998 (age 28)
Yi Tegele (CHN)	3 July 1998 (age 28)
Yu Jiahao (CHN)	1 July 2000 (age 26)
Zeng Chao (CHN)	3 January 2000 (age 26)
