= 2021 UCI Oceania Tour =

- Seventeenth edition of the UCI Oceania Tour

Details
- Dates: 13–23 January
- Location: New Zealand
- Races: 2

The 2021 UCI Oceania Tour was the 17th season of the UCI Oceania Tour.

Due to the restrictions resulting from the COVID-19 pandemic, the season was heavily curtailed and reduced to just two races in New Zealand, the New Zealand Cycle Classic on 13 January 2021 and the Gravel and Tar on 23 January 2021. Due to very low COVID-19 rates, New Zealand was one of the few countries in a position to operate bike races at the time, but this meant that competitors were restricted to those living in New Zealand or able to undergo a two-week quarantine before entering.

Points were awarded to the top finishers of stages at the New Zealand Cycle Classic, and the final general classification standings of both events. The quality and complexity of a race also determined how many points were awarded to the top finishers, the higher the UCI rating of a race, the more points were awarded. The UCI ratings from highest to lowest were are as follows:

- Multi-day events: 2.1 and 2.2
- One-day events: 1.1 and 1.2

No official rankings from the Tour have been published, though Aaron Gate accrued the most UCI Points over the two races.

== Events ==
Races in the 2021 UCI Oceania Tour
Race	Rating	Date	Winner	Team
New Zealand Cycle Classic	2.2	13–17 January	Corbin Strong (NZL)	New Zealand (national team)
(New Zealand) Gravel and Tar	1.2	23 January	Aaron Gate (NZL)	Black Spoke Pro Cycling Academy
