= Omidnia Mashhad Team =

Iranian cycling team

Team information
- UCI code: OMT
- Registered: Iran
- Founded: 2018
- Discipline: Road
- Status: UCI Continental

Team name history
- 2018–: Omidnia Mashhad Team

Omidnia Mashhad Team is an Iranian UCI Continental cycling team established in 2018.

== Team roster ==
As of 21 April 2020.

Rider	Date of birth
Gholamreza Cheraghikavari (IRN)	17 December 1990 (age 35)
Saeed Dargahi (IRN)	22 May 1977 (age 49)
Amirhossein Mohammadiroushnavand (IRN)	4 October 2001 (age 24)
Ahmad Noormohammadi Baygi (IRN)	27 October 1973 (age 52)
Masoud Poor Hemmati (IRN)	12 December 1980 (age 45)
Keivan Rakani (IRN)	29 June 1996 (age 30)

Rider	Date of birth
Kamal Razi (IRN)	30 March 1978 (age 48)
Mahdi Rouzbahaneh (IRN)	24 April 1974 (age 52)
Mohammadjavad Safdari (IRN)	20 September 1991 (age 34)
Seyed Mohammadmoein Salimi (IRN)	21 April 1998 (age 28)
Ehsan Vojdani (IRN)	23 June 1989 (age 37)
