= Pardus Cycling Team =

Chinese cycling team

Team information
- UCI code: PDS
- Registered: China
- Founded: 2020
- Discipline: Road
- Status: UCI Continental (2020–)

Key personnel
- Team manager: Sheng Yongyan

Team name history
- 2020 2021–: Wunvhu Cycling Team (WNH); Pardus Cycling Team (PDS)

Pardus Cycling Team (UCI team code: PDS) is a UCI Continental team, based in Liaoning, China, that was founded in 2020.

== Team roster ==
As of 7 September 2023.

Rider	Date of birth
Feng Shoubo (CHN)	8 November 2004 (age 21)
Ni Zhou (CHN)	2 June 2004 (age 22)
Pan Changyi (CHN)	21 February 2003 (age 23)
Qiao Feng (CHN)	7 May 1991 (age 35)
Wang Bin (CHN)	25 December 2000 (age 25)

Rider	Date of birth
Wang Zhishi (CHN)	22 April 2004 (age 22)
Wang Zihao (CHN)	23 April 2002 (age 24)
Yang Wensen (CHN)	4 May 2004 (age 22)
Zhang Hongtao (CHN)	13 November 2004 (age 21)
Zhang Jiajun (CHN)	5 June 2004 (age 22)
