= Ningxia Sports Lottery Continental Team =

Chinese cycling team

Team information
- UCI code: NLC
- Registered: China
- Founded: 2014
- Discipline: Road
- Status: UCI Continental
- Bicycles: Gusto

Key personnel
- General manager: Jun Feng

Team name history
- 2014 2015–2016 2016–2019 2019 2020–: Ningxia Sports Lottery Cycling Team; Ningxia Sports Lottery–Focus Cycling Team; Ningxia Sports Lottery–Livall Cycling Team; Ningxia Sports Lottery Livall Gusto; Ningxia Sports Lottery Continental Team

Ningxia Sports Lottery Continental Team is a Chinese UCI Continental cycling team established in 2014.

== Team roster ==
As of 21 February 2021.

| Rider | Date of birth |
|---|---|
| Bai Lijun (CHN) | 19 November 1988 (age 37) |
| Jiang Junhua (CHN) | 15 June 2002 (age 24) |
| Li Shan (CHN) | 23 January 1996 (age 30) |
| Liu Zhi Chao (CHN) | 20 March 1997 (age 29) |
| Ma Yinghao (CHN) | 21 February 2002 (age 24) |
| Qiao Feng (CHN) | 7 May 1991 (age 35) |

| Rider | Date of birth |
|---|---|
| Sun Zhengshuai (CHN) | 22 December 1996 (age 29) |
| Wu Leping (CHN) | 8 February 1998 (age 28) |
| Xu Changquan (CHN) | 16 January 1997 (age 29) |
| Xue Chaohua (CHN) | 31 March 1992 (age 34) |
| You Liming (CHN) | 6 October 1999 (age 26) |
| Zhao Huanan (CHN) | 25 October 2001 (age 24) |

== Major results ==
2018
Stage 1 Tour of Qinghai Lake, Georgios Bouglas
Stage 2 Tour de Singkarak, Oleksandr Polivoda
2019
Stage 5 Tour of Qinghai Lake, Georgios Bouglas
Stage 7 Tour of Fuzhou, Alexei Shnyrko
