= Team Skyline =

American UCI Continental cycling team

Team Skyline Pro Cycling
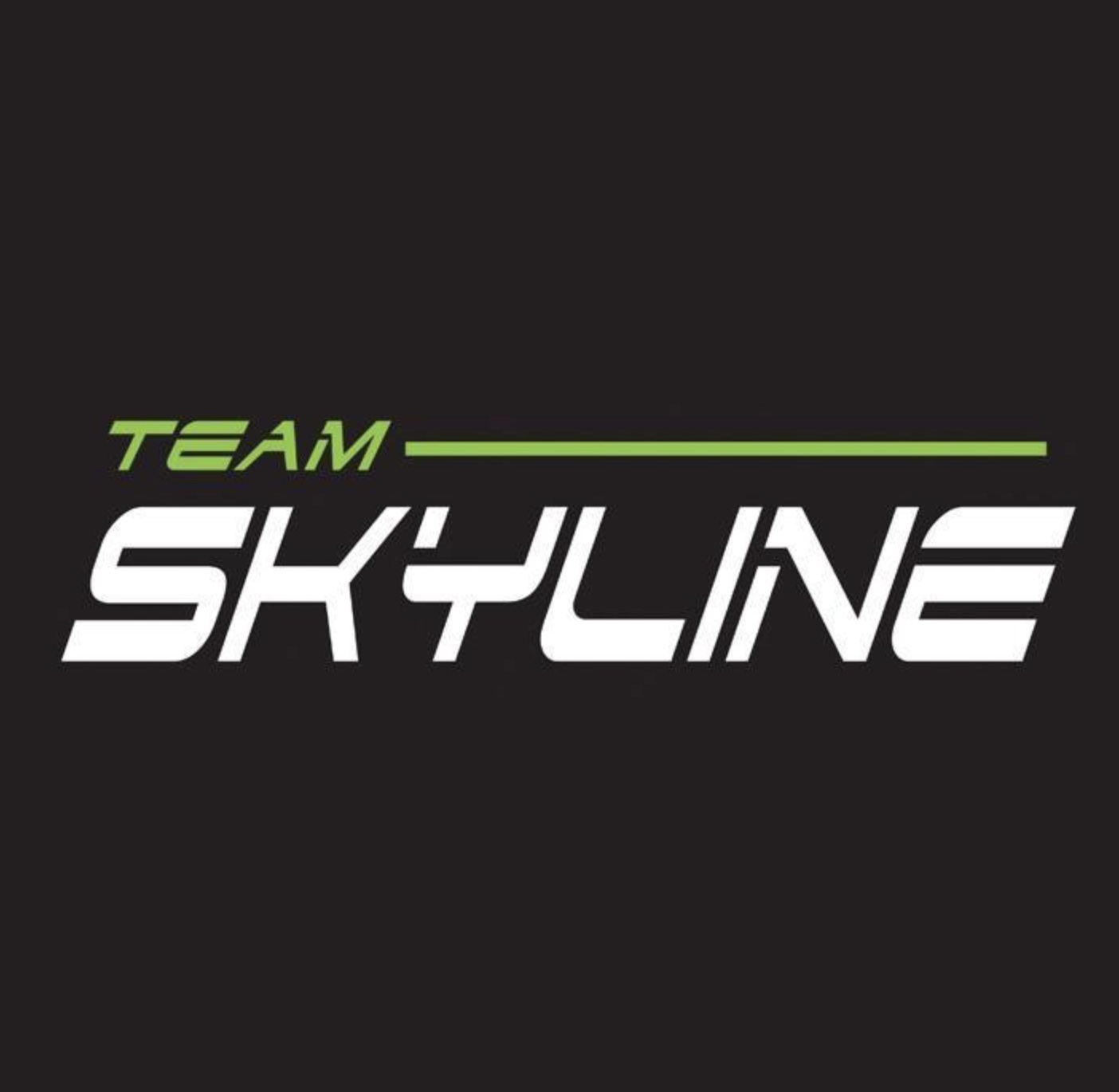
- Team Skyline logo

Team information
- UCI code: TSL
- Registered: United States
- Founded: 2013
- Discipline: Road (2013–present)
- Status: USA Cycling Club (2013–2018); UCI Continental (2019–present)
- Bicycles: Specialized (2024–present)
- Components: Campagnolo
- Website: Team home page

Key personnel
- Team manager: Michael Tacci

Team Skyline is an American UCI Continental cycling team, founded in 2013 and registered in the United States. The squad stepped up to Continental level in 2019 and is now one of the most internationally active American teams, racing in over a dozen countries each year with more than 80 UCI race days per season. Known for its aggressive racing style, Skyline regularly competes against WorldTour teams at events such as the Volta a Portugal, Sibiu Cycling Tour, and Maryland Cycling Classic, where the team has proven capable of animating races at the highest level despite limited resources.

== History ==
Team Skyline was created in 2013 as a grassroots programme in the United States and initially raced as an amateur club. In 2019 the team registered with the UCI as a Continental squad, enabling participation in international stage races.

Since then, Skyline has expanded its calendar significantly, competing across North America and Europe. The team has raced in Portugal, Spain, France, Ireland, Romania, Canada, and the United Arab Emirates, establishing itself as a consistent American presence on the European scene. Its attacking approach has earned invitations to major international events, providing the riders with exposure at some of the sport’s most competitive races.

== Major results ==
=== 2024 ===
- 1st, Stage 5 Tour de Beauce – Conn McDunphy
- 1st, Mountains classification Tour de Beauce – Liam Flanagan
- 1st, Stage 2 Tour of Szeklerland – Conn McDunphy
- 1st, Mountains classification Rás Tailteann – Conn McDunphy
- 1st, Young rider classification Tour of Romania – Jack Makohon
- 1st, Mountains classification Tour of Romania – Jack Makohon
- 1st, Team classification Tour de Beauce

=== 2025 ===
- 1st, Gran Premio New York City – Sean Christian
- 1st, Stage 1 Tour de Beauce – Sean Christian
- 1st, Stage 2 Tour de Beauce – Conn McDunphy
- 1st, Mountains classification Vuelta a Castilla y León – Adam Lewis
- 1st, Points classification Vuelta a Castilla y León – Liam Flanagan
- 4th, Circuito del Porto – Liam Flanagan
- 1st, Leinster Road Championships – Cian Keogh
- 10th overall, Sibiu Cycling Tour – Ethan Dunham
- 5th, Stage 3 & 4 Tour of the Gila – Liam Flanagan
- 4th, Stage 3 Tour of the Gila – Sean Christian
- 8th, Stage 3 Tour of Romania – Adam Lewis
- 10th overall, Tour of Romania – Adam Lewis
- 6th, Stage (Volta a Portugal) – Adam Lewis
- 2nd, National Road Championships Romania – Mihnea Harasim
- 10th overall, Tour of Rhodes – Adam Lewis

== National champions ==
- 2021 – Conn McDunphy, Ireland, Time Trial
- 2022 – Liam Flanagan, United States, U23 Criterium
- 2024 – Cian Keogh, Ireland, Scratch Race
- 2024 – Sean Christian, Pan-American Team Pursuit

== Team roster ==
Rider	Date of birth
Liam Flanagan (USA)	July 27, 2000 (age 26)
Conn McDunphy (IRL)	February 3, 1997 (age 29)
Logan O’Krafka (CAN)	December 30, 2002 (age 23)
Cian Keogh (IRL)	April 6, 1999 (age 27)
Ethan Dunham (USA)	February 27, 2003 (age 23)
Ronan O’Connor (IRL)	September 10, 2003 (age 22)
Adam Lewis (GBR)	August 21, 1995 (age 31)
Jack Makohon (USA)	August 26, 2005 (age 21)
Mihnea Harasim (ROU)	April 28, 2004 (age 22)
Luke Pharis (USA)	November 13, 2003 (age 22)
Chaz Turmon (USA)	September 29, 1990 (age 35)
Alex St Andre (USA)	September 23, 2005 (age 20)
René Corella (MEX)	September 30, 1991 (age 34)
Sean Christian (USA)	April 20, 2002 (age 24)
