= Gapyeong Cycling Team =

South Korean cycling team

Team information
- UCI code: GPC
- Registered: South Korea
- Founded: 2017
- Discipline: Road
- Status: UCI Continental

Key personnel
- Team manager: Oh Chanil

Team name history
- 2017–: Gapyeong Cycling Team

Gapyeong Cycling Team is a South Korean UCI Continental cycling team established in 2017.

== Team roster ==
As of 10 February 2021.

Rider	Date of birth
Cha Dong-heon (KOR)	7 September 1995 (age 30)
Jung Eun-seong (KOR)	30 September 1989 (age 36)
Keum Kang-san (KOR)	7 January 1997 (age 29)
Kim Dae-won (KOR)	11 May 2001 (age 25)
Kim Woong-tae (KOR)	22 January 1997 (age 29)

Rider	Date of birth
Kwon Oh-choel (KOR)	15 March 2002 (age 24)
Lee Ki-suk (KOR)	28 September 1988 (age 37)
Oh Tae-hee (KOR)	18 August 1993 (age 33)
Park Joo-young (KOR)	5 September 2000 (age 26)
Park Sung-baek (KOR)	27 February 1985 (age 41)
