= X-Speed United Continental Team =

Canadian cycling team

Team information
- UCI code: XSU
- Registered: Hong Kong (2019); Canada (2020–)
- Founded: 2019
- Status: UCI Continental (2019–)

Key personnel
- General manager: Ricky Lee
- Team managers: Art Adams; Marc Godart; Amanda O'Connor; Mathieu Tahon; Jonathan Wiggins

Team name history
- 2019–: X-Speed United Continental Team

X-Speed United Continental Team is a Canadian UCI Continental road cycling team. The team registered with the UCI for the 2019 season.

== Team roster ==
As of 8 June 2025.

Rider	Date of birth
Joshua Anderson (USA)	29 December 1998 (age 27)
Aviv Bental (ISR)	28 January 2003 (age 23)
Jack Clark (AUS)	29 January 2006 (age 20)
Filipe Duarte (CAN)	19 February 2006 (age 20)
Freddie Grover (GBR)	19 February 2001 (age 25)
Joe Howcroft (GBR)	10 July 2000 (age 26)
Garin Kelley (USA)	24 September 2004 (age 21)
Kristian Klevgård (NOR)	15 September 1993 (age 32)

Rider	Date of birth
Henrique Martins (CAN)	13 January 2005 (age 21)
Oliver Mortensen (DEN)	20 March 2004 (age 22)
George Radcliffe (GBR)	11 September 2003 (age 22)
Louis Raymond (CAN)	4 April 2004 (age 22)
Tim Riesen (SUI)	16 July 2002 (age 24)
Kiya Rogora (ETH)	3 June 2003 (age 23)
Nikolai Rysletten-Solvoll (NOR)	16 January 2006 (age 20)
Clovis Sanscartier (CAN)	29 September 2006 (age 19)

== Major wins ==
2019
Stage 1 Tour de Iskandar Johor, Ryan Roth
Stage 3 GP Charlevoix, Dylan McKenna
Teams classification Grand Prix Cycliste de Saguenay
