= Meiyo CCN Pro Cycling =

Swedish cycling team

Team information
- UCI code: MPC
- Registered: Sweden (2005–2016, 2019–2020); Kuwait (2017); Finland (2018); Republic of China (Taiwan) (2021–)
- Founded: 2005
- Discipline: Road
- Status: UCI Continental

Team name history
- 2005–2008 2009 2010 2011–2013 2014–2016 2017 2017 2018 2019–2020 2021–: Cyclesport.se; MagnusMaximusCoffee.com; Sprocket; Cyclesport.se; Team Bliz–Merida; Cyclesport.se–Memil Pro Cycling; Memil Pro Cycling; Memil–CCN Pro Cycling; Memil Pro Cycling; Meiyo CCN Pro Cycling

Meiyo CCN Pro Cycling is a Taiwanese UCI Continental team founded in 2005.

== Team roster ==
As of 20 February 2021.

Rider	Date of birth
Emil Andersson (SWE)	20 March 1993 (age 33)
Chen Chien-liang (TWN)	7 November 1993 (age 32)
Jordan Kerby (NZL)	15 August 1992 (age 34)
Lee Wei-cheng (TWN)	3 July 1984 (age 42)
Li Kuan-hsien (TWN)	19 July 1994 (age 32)
Carl Ljunggren (SWE)	9 December 1996 (age 29)
Kane Richards (AUS)	1 December 1996 (age 29)

Rider	Date of birth
Elliot Schultz (AUS)	5 August 2000 (age 26)
Bradley Soden (NZL)	12 August 1997 (age 29)
Ting Cheng-chang (TWN)	10 October 1980 (age 45)
Tsai Shao-yu (TWN)	20 August 1982 (age 44)
Tsai Ying-jie (TWN)	18 November 2002 (age 23)
Sam Volkers (AUS)	13 July 1992 (age 34)
Bailey Walters (AUS)	8 June 1999 (age 27)

== Major results ==
2018
Stage 6 Tour du Maroc, Jacob Tipper
Stage 11 Tour of Qinghai Lake, Jacob Tipper
Stage 3 Tour of Quanzhou Bay, Roy Eefting

2019
Stage 1 Tour du Maroc, Ben Hetherington
Stages 11 & 12 Tour of Qinghai Lake, Roy Eefting
Stage 3 Tour of Xingtai, Roy Eefting

2022
Stage 1 (ITT) Sharjah International Cycling Tour, Cyrus Monk
