= Massi Vivo–Conecta =

Paraguayan cycling team

Team information
- UCI code: VIV (until 2019); MVC (2020–)
- Registered: Paraguay
- Founded: 2015
- Discipline: Road
- Status: UCI Continental (2016–)

Key personnel
- Team managers: Luis Manuel Meaurio; Andrés Orbegozo

Team name history
- 2015 2016–2018 2019 2020–: Team Vivo; Vivo Team Grupo Oresy; Massi Vivo–Grupo Oresy; Massi Vivo–Conecta

Massi Vivo–Conecta is a Paraguayan UCI Continental cycling team founded in 2015 as an amateur team. The following year, the team was granted a UCI Continental licence.

== Team roster ==
As of 20 February 2021.

Rider	Date of birth
Nelson Acosta (PAR)	7 June 2000 (age 26)
Francisco Adorno (PAR)	27 September 2001 (age 24)
Ramón Cabrera (PAR)	14 August 2002 (age 24)
Rubén Caseny (ESP)	13 September 1986 (age 39)
Javier Comín (ESP)	23 May 1994 (age 32)

Rider	Date of birth
Samuel Coronel (PAR)	26 June 1990 (age 36)
Esteban Gómez (PAR)	24 March 1999 (age 27)
David Maidana (PAR)	14 July 2000 (age 26)
Juan Salas (ARG)	5 September 1997 (age 29)
Emanuel Villalba (ARG)	8 July 1996 (age 30)

== Major results ==
2016
Stage 2 Volta Ciclistica Internacional do Rio Grande do Sul, Daniel Juarez
