= Korail Cycling Team =

South Korean cycling team

Team information
- Registered: South Korea
- Founded: 2012
- Disciplines: Road; Track
- Status: UCI Continental

Key personnel
- Team managers: Do Eun-chul; Kim Myoung-gon

Team name history
- 2013–2019; 2020; 2021–: Korail Cycling Team; KTX Korail Cycling Team; Korail Cycling Team

Korail Cycling Team is a South Korean UCI Continental cycling team, established in 2012 to compete from the start of the 2013 season.

== Team roster ==
As of 14 February 2021.

Rider	Date of birth
Bang Seon-hoe (KOR)	7 April 1998 (age 28)
Choi Jong-hyeok (KOR)	15 June 2001 (age 25)
Im Jae-yeon (KOR)	6 September 1991 (age 35)
Joo Dae-yeong (KOR)	10 October 1996 (age 29)
Joo Kang-eun (KOR)	16 March 1996 (age 30)

Rider	Date of birth
Jun Jee-hwan (KOR)	7 August 2002 (age 24)
Kim Dong-uk (KOR)	23 January 1998 (age 28)
Kim Hyeon-seok (KOR)	18 August 1995 (age 31)
Kim Ji-ho (KOR)	1 October 1996 (age 29)
Yun Jae-bin (KOR)	17 April 2001 (age 25)

== Major wins ==
2014
Stage 6 Tour de Korea, Kyung-Gu Jang

2016
Stage 6 Tour de Singkarak, Kyung-Gu Jang

== National champions ==
2015
South Korea National Time Trial, Jang Kyung-gu
