= Beltrami TSA–Tre Colli =

Italian cycling team

Team information
- UCI code: BTC
- Registered: Italy
- Founded: 2016
- Discipline: Road
- Status: Amateur (2016–18); UCI Continental (2019–)

Key personnel
- General manager: Stefano Chiari
- Team managers: Orlando Maini; Roberto Miodini

Team name history
- 2016–2017 2018 2019 2020 2021–: Hopplà–Petroli Firenze; Petroli Firenze Hoppla Maserati; Team Beltrami TSA–Hopplà–Petroli Firenze (BHP); Beltrami TSA–Marchiol (BTM); Beltrami TSA–Tre Colli (BTC)

Beltrami TSA–Tre Colli is an Italian UCI Continental team founded in 2016. The team upgraded from amateur status to UCI Continental level in 2019.

== Team roster ==
As of 31 January 2021.

Rider	Date of birth
Lorenzo Balestra (ITA)	24 September 2002 (age 23)
Federico Chiari (ITA)	15 May 2001 (age 25)
Giosuè Crescioli (ITA)	20 April 2001 (age 25)
Luca Cretti (ITA)	30 June 2001 (age 25)
Nicolò De Lisi (SUI)	7 January 2001 (age 25)
Davide De Pretto (ITA)	19 April 2002 (age 24)
Matteo Freddi (ITA)	1 June 2001 (age 25)

Rider	Date of birth
Marco Grendene (ITA)	4 October 2000 (age 25)
Lorenzo Milesi (ITA)	19 March 2002 (age 24)
Nicolò Parisini (ITA)	25 April 2000 (age 26)
Lorenzo Peschi (ITA)	13 January 2002 (age 24)
Thomas Pesenti (ITA)	16 October 1999 (age 26)
Andrea Piras (ITA)	5 February 2002 (age 24)
