= Uijeongbu Cycling Team =

South Korean cycling team

Team information
- UCI code: UCT
- Registered: South Korea
- Founded: 2018
- Discipline: Road
- Status: UCI Continental

Key personnel
- Team manager: Jeong Han-jong

Team name history
- 2018–: Uijeongbu Cycling Team

Uijeongbu Cycling Team is a South Korean UCI Continental cycling team established in 2018.

== Team roster ==
As of 2 March 2021.

Rider	Date of birth
Choi Tae-ho (KOR)	10 September 1997 (age 28)
Jang Hun (KOR)	30 April 2000 (age 26)
Jun Hyun-su (KOR)	22 January 2000 (age 26)
Jung Min-gyo (KOR)	3 September 2002 (age 24)
Kim Ung-gyeom (KOR)	11 January 1996 (age 30)

Rider	Date of birth
Lee Ho (KOR)	19 April 2001 (age 25)
Lee Ho-sam (KOR)	12 September 2002 (age 23)
Park Gyeong-min (KOR)	15 June 2000 (age 26)
Park Sang-hoon (KOR)	13 March 1993 (age 33)
So In-su (KOR)	10 August 1998 (age 28)
