= Sias–Rime =

Italian cycling team

Team information
- UCI code: SRD
- Registered: Italy
- Founded: 2019
- Discipline: Road
- Status: UCI Continental (2019–)
- Bicycles: Drali
- Components: Deda

Key personnel
- Team managers: Daniele Calosso; Sergio Gozio; Gabriele Rampollo

Team name history
- 2019–2021; 2022 2023–: Iseo–Rime–Carnovali; Carnovali–Rime Sias–Rime

Sias–Rime is an Italian UCI Continental road bicycle racing team founded in 2019.

== Team roster ==
As of 13 February 2021.

Rider	Date of birth
Christian Bagatin (ITA)	14 June 2002 (age 24)
Michele Berasi (ITA)	13 January 2002 (age 24)
Filippo Bertone (ITA)	15 January 1997 (age 29)
Andrea D'Amato (ITA)	14 November 2002 (age 23)
Omar El Gouzi (ITA)	16 August 1999 (age 27)
Giosuè Epis (ITA)	4 March 2002 (age 24)
Matteo Furlan (ITA)	31 October 1998 (age 27)
Federico Iacomoni (ITA)	10 July 2002 (age 24)

Rider	Date of birth
Leandro Masotto (ITA)	14 May 1999 (age 27)
Michael Minali (ITA)	2 July 1999 (age 27)
Yaroslav Parashchak (UKR)	3 October 2000 (age 25)
Alex Raimondi (ITA)	30 March 2000 (age 26)
Luca Regalli (ITA)	3 December 1999 (age 26)
Matteo Tarolla (ITA)	25 September 2001 (age 24)
Samuele Zambelli (ITA)	2 April 1998 (age 28)
