= Ribble Weldtite =

British cycling team

Team information
- UCI code: RPC (2019); RWC (2020–2023)
- Registered: Great Britain
- Founded: 2017
- Disbanded: 2023
- Discipline: Road
- Status: UCI Continental (2019–2023)
- Bicycles: Ribble
- Website: Team home page

Key personnel
- General manager: Tom Timothy
- Team managers: Colin Sturgess; Matt Cronshaw; Sean McNicholl; John Reeve

Team name history
- 2017–2019 2020–2023: Ribble Pro Cycling; Ribble Weldtite

Ribble Weldtite Pro Cycling was a UCI Continental team, that was founded in 2017 by Jack Rees. The team registered with the UCI for the 2019 season. The team will fold due to sponsorship issues for the 2023 season and the foreseeable future.

== Team roster ==
As of 2 January 2022.

Rider	Date of birth
Will Brown (GBR)	26 November 1992 (age 33)
Cameron Jeffers (GBR)	30 October 1996 (age 29)
Richard Jones (GBR)	30 September 1992 (age 33)
Zeb Kyffin (GBR)	23 February 1998 (age 28)
Gruffudd Lewis (GBR)	11 November 1987 (age 38)
Finn Crockett (GBR)	30 June 1999 (age 27)
Ollie Peckover (GBR)	23 April 1998 (age 28)
Matthew King (GBR)	20 October 1995 (age 30)
Jack Rees (GBR)	12 May 1989 (age 37)
Simon Wilson (GBR)	1 August 1980 (age 46)
Harry Tanfield (GBR)	17 November 1994 (age 31)
Alex Peters (GBR)	31 March 1994 (age 32)
Charlie Tanfield (GBR)	17 November 1996 (age 29)
Ross Lamb (GBR)	12 October 1995 (age 30)
Red Walters (GRN)	19 January 1999 (age 27)
Stuart Balfour (GBR)	13 May 1997 (age 29)
Tom Timothy (GBR)

== Major results ==
2019
Grand Prix des Marbriers, Damien Clayton
2022
Rutland–Melton CiCLE Classic, Finn Crockett
