= 2005 national road cycling championships =

The 2005 national road cycling championships began in January in Australia and New Zealand. Most of the European national championships take place in June.

== Jerseys ==
The winner of each national championship wears the national jersey in all their races for the next year in the respective discipline, apart from the World Championships, or unless they are wearing a category leader's jersey in a stage race. Most national champion jerseys tend to represent a country's flag or use the colours from it. Jerseys may also feature traditional sporting colours of a country that not derived from a national flag, such as the National colours of Australia on the jerseys of Australian national champions.

== 2005 champions ==
=== Men's Elite ===
Country	Men's Elite Road Race Champion	Champion's Current Team	Men's Elite Time Trial Champion	Champion's Current Team
Argentina	Gustavo Toledo	Rioja	Guillermo Brunetta	Cordobesa
Australia	Robbie McEwen	Davitamon–Lotto	Nathan O'Neill	Navigators Insurance
Austria	Gerrit Glomser	Lampre–Caffita	Hans-Peter Obwaller	Sava
Belarus	Aleksandr Kuschynski	Amore & Vita–Beretta	Vasil Kiryienka	
Belgium	Serge Baguet	Davitamon–Lotto	Marc Wauters	Rabobank
Bolivia	Horacio Gallardo			
Brazil	Roberson Silva	Scott–Marcondes Cesar–Fadenp SJC	Pedro Nicacio	Clube DataRo de Ciclismo
Bulgaria	Ivailo Gabrovski	Hemus 1896-Aurora 2000 Berchi	Ivailo Gabrovski	Hemus 1896-Aurora 2000 Berchi
Burkina Faso	Rabaki Jérémie Ouédraogo			
Canada	François Parisien	Espoirs Laval	Svein Tuft	Symmetrics
Chile	Juan Francisco Cabrera			
Colombia	Walter Pedraza		Iván Parra	Colombia–Selle Italia
Costa Rica	Paulo Vargas		Federico Ramírez	
Ivory Coast	Abdoulaye Sessouma			
Croatia	Matija Kvasina	Perutnina Ptuj	Martin Cotar	
Cuba	Damian Martínez		Luís Alberto Romero	
Czech Republic	Ján Svorada	eD'system-ZVVZ	Ondřej Sosenka	Acqua & Sapone–Adria Mobil
Denmark	Lars Bak	Team CSC	Michael Blaudzun	Team CSC
Estonia	Jaan Kirsipuu	Crédit Agricole	Jaan Kirsipuu	Crédit Agricole
France	Pierrick Fédrigo	Bouygues Télécom	Sylvain Chavanel	Cofidis
Finland	Jussi Veikkanen	Française des Jeux	Tommi Martikainen	
Germany	Gerald Ciolek	Akud Arnolds Sicherheit	Michael Rich	Gerolsteiner
Greece	Vasilis Anastopoulos	Volksbank-Ideal	Ioannis Tamouridis	
Guatemala	Jhonny Morales			
Hungary	Laszlo Garamszegi		Csaba Szekeres	
Iran	Mehdi Sohrabi	Paykan	Mehdi Sohrabi	Paykan
Ireland	David O'Loughlin	Navigators Insurance	David McCann	Giant Asia Racing Team
Israel	Maxim Burlutsky		Gali Ronen	
Italy	Enrico Gasparotto	Liquigas–Bianchi	Marco Pinotti	Saunier Duval–Prodir
Japan	Hidenori Nodera	Shimano–Memory Corp	Makoto Iijima	Sumita Ravanello Pearl Izumi
Kazakhstan	Alexander Vinokourov	T-Mobile Team	Dmitriy Muravyev	Crédit Agricole
Latvia	Aleksejs Saramotins	Rietumu Bank	Raivis Belohvoščiks	Team Universal Caffé-Styloffice
Lithuania	Aivaras Baranauskas		Raimondas Rumšas	
Luxembourg	Fränk Schleck	Team CSC	Andy Schleck	Team CSC
Malaysia	Jamaludin Amiruddin	Proton T-Bikes Cycling Team		
Malta	Roderick Muscat		Etienne Bonello	
Mongolia	Jamsran Ulzii-Orshikh	Marco Polo Cycling Team	Jamsran Ulzii-Orshikh	Marco Polo Cycling Team
Mexico	Domingo González			
Namibia	Dan Craven			
Netherlands	Léon van Bon	Davitamon–Lotto	Thomas Dekker	Rabobank
Netherlands Antilles	Jaime Perestrelo			
New Zealand	Gordon McCauley		Robin Reid	Marco Polo Cycling Team
Norway	Morten Christiansen	Sparebanken Vest–Ridley	Thor Hushovd	Crédit Agricole
Paraguay	Fernando Rolón		Carlos Carlson	
Peru	José Valverde		Gustavo Rios	
Poland	Adam Wadecki	Intel–Action	Piotr Mazur	
Portugal	Joaquim Andrade	Riberalves-Goldnutrition	Cândido Barbosa	L.A. Aluminios-Liberty Seguros
Qatar	Said Moosa			
Romania	Dan Diaconu		Alexandru Ciocan	
Russia	Serguei Ivanov	T-Mobile Team	Maxim Belkov	
Serbia and Montenegro	Ivan Stević	Aerospace Engeenering Pro Equipe	Zsolt Dér	
Seychelles	Hedson Mathieu			
Singapore	Junaidi Hashim			
Slovakia	Martin Prázdnovský	CK ZP Sport A.S. Podbrezova	Matej Jurčo	Domina Vacanze
Slovenia	Mitja Mahorič	Perutnina Ptuj	Gregor Gazvoda	Perutnina Ptuj
South Africa	Ryan Cox	Barloworld	Tiaan Kannemeyer	Barloworld
Spain	Juan Manuel Gárate	Saunier Duval–Prodir	José Iván Gutiérrez	Illes Balears–Caisse d'Epargne
Sweden	Jonas Ljungblad	Amore & Vita–Beretta	Viktor Renäng	
Switzerland	Martin Elmiger	Phonak	Fabian Cancellara	Fassa Bortolo
Tunisia	Ayman Ben Hassine			
Ukraine	Mikhaylo Khalilov	LPR–Piacenza	Andriy Hrivko	Domina Vacanze
United Kingdom	Russell Downing	Recycling.co.uk–MG X-Power	Stuart Dangerfield	
United States	Chris Wherry	Health Net–Maxxis	Chris Baldwin	Navigators Insurance
Uzbekistan	Sergey Lagutin	Landbouwkrediet–Colnago	Sergey Lagutin	Landbouwkrediet–Colnago
Venezuela	Wilmer Vasquez			
Zimbabwe	Mohamed Conway		Dave Martin	

=== Women's ===
Country	Women's Road Race Champion	Women's Time Trial Champion
Argentina	Paola Toane	Valeria Müller
Australia	Lorian Graham	Oenone Wood
Austria	Andrea Graus	Christiane Soeder
Belarus	Tatsiana Sharakova	Tatsiana Sharakova
Belgium	Corine Hierckens	Natacha Maes
Brazil	Clemilda Fernandes	Camila Rodrigues
Canada	Geneviève Jeanson	Sue Palmer-Komar
Cuba		Yuliet Rodríguez
Czech Republic	Lada Kozlíková	Lada Kozlíková
Denmark	Dorte Rasmussen	Dorte Rasmussen
France	Magali Le Floc'h	Edwige Pitel
Finland	Pia Sundstedt	Tiina Nieminen
Germany	Regina Schleicher	Judith Arndt
Greece	Anastasia Pastourmatzi	Anastasia Pastourmatzi
Hungary	Mónika Király	
Ireland	Siobhan Horgan	
Italy	Silvia Parietti	Tatiana Guderzo
Japan	Miho Oki	Miyoko Karami
Kazakhstan	Zulfiya Zabirova	Zulfiya Zabirova
Lithuania	Inga Čilvinaitė	Svetlana Pauliukaitė
Luxembourg	Nathalie Lamborelle	
Malta	Stefania Magri	Michelle Wood
Mongolia	Jamsran Ulziisolongo	Jamsran Ulziisolongo
Netherlands	Janneke Vos	Suzanne de Goede
New Zealand	Sarah Ulmer	Sarah Ulmer
Norway	Anita Valen	Anita Valen
Poland	Paulina Brzeźna	Bogumiła Matusiak
Portugal	Isabel Caetano	
Russia	Yuliya Martisova	Svetlana Bubnenkova
Serbia and Montenegro	Zorica Milicevic	Zorica Milicevic
South Africa	Ronel Van Wyk	Anke Moore
Spain	María Isabel Moreno	Eneritz Iturriagaechevarria
Sweden	Susanne Ljungskog	Emma Johansson
Switzerland	Sereina Trachsel	Karin Thürig
Ukraine	Valentyna Karpenko	Iryna Shpylyova
United Kingdom	Nicole Cooke	Julia Shaw
United States	Katheryn Curi	Kristin Armstrong
Venezuela	Blendys Rojas	
Zimbabwe	Linda Davidson	

=== Men's Under-23 ===
Country	Men's Under-23 Road Race Champion	Men's Under-23 Time Trial Champion
Argentina	Jorge Montenegro	Juan Pablo Dotti
Australia	Chris Sutton	Mark Jamieson
Austria	Markus Eibegger	Markus Eibegger
Belarus	Sergei Dovbniuk	Branislau Samoilau
Belgium	Dries Devenyns	Dominique Cornu
Brazil	Breno Sidoti	Breno Sidoti
Canada	Ryan Roth	Christian Meier
Colombia	Juan Pablo Forero	Dalivier Ospina
Costa Rica	Henry Raabe	Henry Raabe
Croatia	Emanuel Kišerlovski	Romano Vičič
Czech Republic	František Raboň	František Raboň
Denmark	Jan Almblad	Martin Mortensen
Estonia	Kalle Kriit	Rene Mandri
France	Aurélien Passeron	Dimitri Champion
Germany		Paul Martens
Greece		Panagiotis Potsakis
Hungary	Daniel Zsombók	Péter Kusztor
Ireland	Paidi O'Brien	
Italy	Adriano Angeloni	Tiziano Dall'Antonia
Japan	Yukiya Arashiro	
Luxembourg	Patrick Gressnich	Laurent Didier
Netherlands	Sebastian Langeveld	Thom Van Dulmen
New Zealand	Logan Hutchings	Logan Hutchings
Norway	Lars Nordhaug	
Poland		Rafał Ratajczyk
Portugal	Hélder Oliveira	Filipe Cardoso
Russia	Alexander Mironov	
Slovakia	Martin Velits	Peter Velits
Slovenia	Simon Špilak	
South Africa	Willie Van Zyl	
Spain	Javier Moreno	José Luis Ruíz
Switzerland	Loic Mühlemann	Michael Schär
United Kingdom	Ben Greenwood	Ben Greenwood
United States	Ian MacGregor	Steven Cozza
