= 2008 national road cycling championships =

The 2008 national road cycling championships begin in January in Australia and New Zealand. Most of the other national championships do not take place until June or July.

== Jerseys ==
The winner of each national championship wears the national jersey in all their races for the next year in the respective discipline, apart from the World Championships. The jerseys tend to represent the countries' flag or use the colours from it.

== 2008 Champions ==
Country	Men's Elite		Women's Elite		Men's U-23	
Country	Road Race	Time Trial	Road Race	Time Trial	Road Race	Time Trial
Albania	Paljon Zarka	Paljon Zarka				
Algeria	Redouane Chabaane	Azzedine Lagab				
Andorra		David Albós				
Angola	Bruno André	Leonardo Zietoso				
Antigua and Barbuda	Jyme Bridges					
Netherlands Antilles	Jerry Otten	Jerry Otten	Gerda Fokker	Gerda Fokker		
Argentina	Gerardo Fernández	Matías Médici	Daiana Almada	Valeria Müller	Gustavo Borcard	Roman Mastrangelo
Australia	Matthew Lloyd	Adam Hansen	Oenone Wood	Bridie O'Donnell	Simon Clarke	Matt King
Austria	Christian Pfannberger	Stefan Denifl	Monika Schachl	Monika Schachl	Martin Schöffmann	Stefan Denifl
Bahamas	Tracey Sweeting	Mark Holowesko			Laurence Jupp	
Belarus	Yauheni Hutarovich	Andrei Kunitski	Tatsiana Sharakova	Tatsiana Sharakova	Siarhei Papok	Siarhei Papok
Belgium	Jürgen Roelandts	Stijn Devolder	Ilse Geldhof	An Van Rie	Dimitri Claeys	Jan Ghyselinck
Belize	Gregory Lovell					
Bolivia	Horacio Gallardo	Óscar Soliz	Ana Maria Ventura		Ramiro Miranda	
Brazil	Valcemar Justino da Silva	Cleberson de Almeida	Clemilda Fernandes	Camila Pinheiro Monteiro Rodrigues		
Bulgaria	Georgi Petrov	Ivaïlo Gabrovski				
Burkina Faso	Abdul Wahab Sawadogo					
Canada	Christian Meier	Svein Tuft	Alex Wrubleski	Anne Samplonius		David Veilleux
Chile	Gonzalo Miranda	Robinson Núñez	Paola Muñoz		Juan Raúl Bravo	Juan Raúl Bravo
China	Gang Xu	Baoqing Song				
Colombia	Darwin Atapuma	Israel Ochoa	Ana Paola Madriñan	Ana Paola Madriñan		
Ivory Coast	Bassirou Konté					
Costa Rica	Alexander Sanchez	Henry Raabe	Marcela Castillo	Roxana Alvarado	César Rojas	Moisés Hernández
Croatia	Tomislav Dančulović	Matija Kvasina	Viena Balen	Viena Balen	Kristijan Đurasek	Kristijan Đurasek
Cyprus	Nikos Dimitriou	Andreas Nikolaou				
Cuba	Juan Carlos Arias	Pedro Portuondo	Yumari González	Dalila Rodriguez		
Czech Republic	Petr Benčík	František Raboň	Martina Ružicková	Jarmila Machačová		
Denmark	Nicki Sørensen	Lars Bak	Linda Villumsen	Linda Villumsen	Mads Rydicher	Michael Christensen
Dominican Republic	Wendy Cruz		Juana Fernandez		Adderlyn Cruz	
Ecuador	Carlos Quishpe		Maria Bone		Rafael Eduardo	
El Salvador	Alberto Guevara	Paolo Ferraro	Roxana Ortiz	Roxana Ortiz		
Eritrea	Daniel Teklehaymanot					
Estonia	Jaan Kirsipuu	Tanel Kangert	Grete Treier	Grete Treier	Jõeäär Gert	Jõeäär Gert
France	Nicolas Vogondy	Sylvain Chavanel	Jeannie Longo	Jeannie Longo	Arnaud Courteille	
Finland	Jussi Veikkanen	Matti Helminen	Mirella Harju	Anne Rautio	Paavo Paajanen	Jussi Eskelinen
Germany	Fabian Wegmann	Bert Grabsch	Luise Keller	Hanka Kupfernagel	Martin Reimer	Andreas Henig
Ghana	Emmanuel Amoako					
Greece	Nikolaos Kaloudakis	Iosif Dalezios	Anastasia Pastourmatzi	Elissavet Chantzi		Neofytos Sakellaridis
Guatemala	José Migdael Zeceña				Rolando Solomán	
Guyana	John Charles					
Hungary	Zoltán Madaras	László Bodrogi		Mónika Király		Gábor Fejes
India		Harpreet Singh		Neelamma Malagawad		
Indonesia	Parno Parno		Santia Tri Kusuma			
Iran	Ghader Mizbani	Hossein Askari				
Ireland	Dan Martin	Paul Healion	Siobhan Dervan	Olivia Dillon	Dan Martin	Denis Dunworth
Iceland	Hafsteinn Geirsson	Hafsteinn Geirsson	Bryndís Þorsteinsdóttir	Karen Axelsdóttir		
Israel	Hortig Nati	Maxim Borlitzkey	Leah Goldstein	Leah Goldstein		
Italy	Filippo Simeoni	Marco Pinotti	Fabiana Luperini	Tatiana Guderzo	Damiano Caruso	Adriano Malori
Jamaica			Iona Wynter-Parks			
Japan	Hidenori Nodera	Kazuya Okazaki	Miho Oki			
Kazakhstan	Assan Bazayev	Andrey Mizurov	Zoulfia Zabirova	Zoulfia Zabirova		
Kyrgyzstan	Evgeny Vakker	Evgeny Vakker				
Latvia	Normunds Lasis	Raivis Belohvoščiks				Gatis Smukulis
Lesotho	Poloko Makara	Poloko Makara				
Lebanon	Salah Ribah	Kevork Altounian				
Libya	Fethi Ahmed Atunsi	Ahmed Atunsi				
Liechtenstein	Dimitri Jiriakov	Dimitri Jiriakov				
Lithuania	Tomas Vaitkus	Ignatas Konovalovas	Modesta Vžesniauskaitė	Daiva Tušlaitė		
Luxembourg	Fränk Schleck	Kim Kirchen	Nathalie Lamborelle	Christine Majerus	Cyrille Heymans	Ben Gastauer
Madagascar	Fiandraza Bayard	David Solosofon				
Malaysia	Mohammed Lutfi		Alias Noor Azian			
Malta	Etienne Bonello	Etienne Bonello	Marie Claire Aquilina	Danica Spiteri		
Morocco	Adil Jelloul					
Mauritius	Hugo Caëtane	Yannick Lincoln				
Mexico	Luis Fernando Macias	José Manuel García	Alessandra Grassi	Alessandra Grassi	Luis Pulido	Rodolfo Avila
Moldova	Alexandre Pliușchin	Sergiu Cioban				
Mongolia	Khayankhyarvaa Uuganbayar	Tuulkhangai Tuguldur	Jamsran Ulzii-Solongo	Jamsran Ulzii-Solongo		
Namibia	Dan Craven	Jacques Celliers	Cordula Moller			
Netherlands	Lars Boom	Lars Boom	Marianne Vos	Mirjam Melchers	Ronan van Zandbeek	
New Zealand	Julian Dean	Logan Hutchings	Melissa Holt	Melissa Holt	Thomas Hanover	Clinton Avery
Nicaragua	Fernando Tejada					
North Korea	Chol Ryong Kim	Chol Ryong Kim				
Norway	Kurt Asle Arvesen	Edvald Boasson Hagen	Anita Valen de Vries	Anita Valen de Vries	Ole Jørgen Jensen	Vegard Breen
Panama	Jonathon Torres				Jorge Castelblanco	
Paraguay	Raúl Fernández	Raúl Fernández				
Peru	Hugo Mochica	Hugo Mochica	Daysi Sulca	Daysi Sulca	Sergio Sarate	Fernando Flores
Poland	Marcin Sapa	Łukasz Bodnar	Paulina Brzeźna	Bogumiła Matusiak	Piotr Osiñski	Jarosław Marycz
Portugal	João Cabreira	Sérgio Paulinho	Esther Alves	Isabel Caetano		Nelson Oliveira
Romania	Alexandru Ciocan	George Manu	Eniko Nagy	Eniko Nagy		Ionel Rusu
Russia	Serguei Ivanov	Vladimir Gusev	Yuliya Martisova	Elena Chalyh		Timofey Kritsky
Saint Lucia	Kurt Maraj					
Seychelles	Francis Louis	Andy Rose				
South Korea	Sung Baek Park	Jung Hwan Youm				
Serbia	Predrag Prokić	Esad Hasanović	Dragana Kovačević	Vanessa Durman	Gabor Kasa	Đorde Jovanovic
Slovakia	Matej Jurčo	Matej Jurčo			Ondrej Zelinka	
Slovenia	Borut Božič	Gregor Gazvoda			Gašper Švab	
Spain	Alejandro Valverde	Luis León Sánchez				
Sweden	Jonas Ljungblad	Fredrik Ericsson	Emilia Fahlin	Emma Johansson	Jonas Ahlstrand	Tobias Ludvigsson
Switzerland	Markus Zberg	Fabian Cancellara	Jennifer Hohl	Karin Thürig		Marcel Wyss
Turkey	Orhan Şahin	Kemal Küçükbay	Semra Yetiş		Recep Ünalan	
Ukraine	Ruslan Pidgornyy	Andriy Hryvko	Tetyana Styazhkina	Tetyana Styazhkina		Yuriy Agarkov
United Kingdom	Robert Hayles	Michael Hutchinson	Nicole Cooke	Sharon Laws	Peter Kennaugh	Alex Dowsett
United Arab Emirates	Khaled Ali Shambih	Badr Bani Hammad				
United States	Tyler Hamilton	David Zabriskie	Brooke Miller	Alison Powers	Kirk Carlsen	Peter Stetina
Uzbekistan	Sergey Lagutin	Vladimir Tuychiev				
Venezuela	Noel Vasquez	Tomás Gil	Danielys García	Danielys García		
Vietnam		Mai Cong Hieu		Doan Thi Cam Mien		
Zimbabwe	Dave Martin	Dave Martin	Linda Davidson			
