= Greek National Road Race Championships =

Annual cycling competition

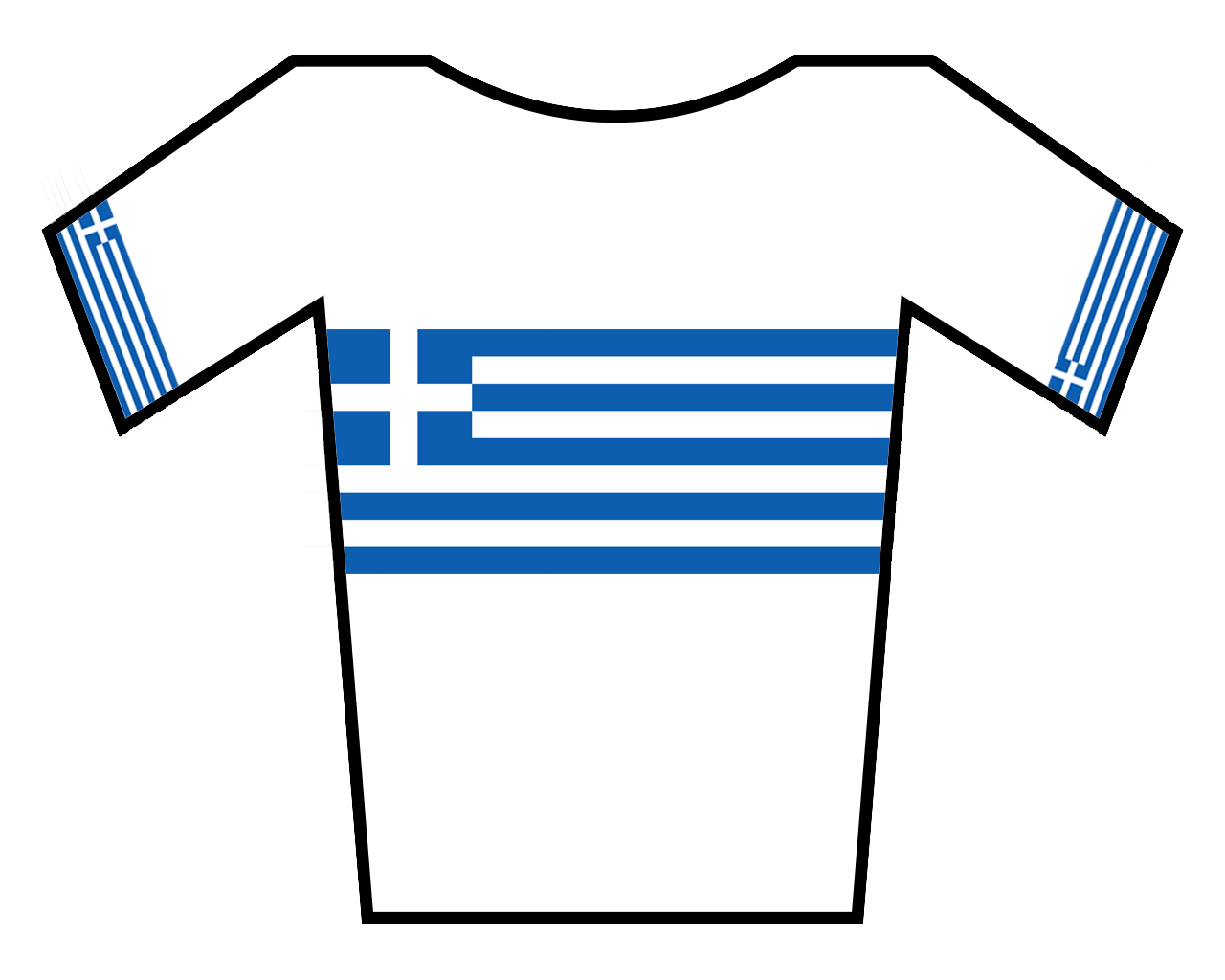

The Greek National Road Race Championships have been held since 2000.

== Men ==
=== Elite ===
Greek National Road Race Championships – Men's elite race
Race details
- Region: Greece
- Discipline: Road bicycle racing
- Type: One-day

History
- First edition: 2000
- Editions: 26 (as of 2025)
- First winner: Vasilis Anastopoulos
- Most wins: Ioannis Tamouridis (5 wins)
- Most recent: Nikiforos Arvanitou

Year	Gold	Silver	Bronze
2000	Vasilis Anastopoulos	Panayotis Marentakis	Iosif Dalezios
2001	Vasilis Anastopoulos	Panayotis Marentakis	Markos Moraïtakis
2002	Márkos Moraïtákis	Andreas Markakis	Dimitris Dimitrakopoulos
2003	Panayotis Marentakis	Iosif Dalezios	Manolis Kotoulas
2004	Vasilis Anastopoulos	Minas Malatos	Vassilis Krommidas
2005	Vasilis Anastopoulos	Elpidoforos Potouridis	Ioannis Tamouridis
2006	Ioannis Tamouridis	Orestis Andriotis	Vasilis Anastopoulos
2007	Periklis Ilias	Nikolaos Kaloudakis	Georgios Tentsos
2008	Nikolaos Kaloudakis	Georgios Skalidakis	Alexandros Mavridis
2009	Ioannis Drakakis	Dimitrios Gkaliouris	Vasilis Anastopoulos
2010	Ioannis Tamouridis	Polychronis Tzortzakis	Neofytos Sakellaridis-Mangouras
2011	Ioannis Tamouridis	Neofytos Sakellaridis-Mangouras	Polychronis Tzortzakis
2012	Ioannis Drakakis	Georgios Bouglas	Charalampos Kastrantas
2013	Ioannis Tamouridis	Georgios Bouglas	Apostolos Boúglas
2014	Georgios Bouglas	Apostolos Boúglas	Ioannis Tamouridis
2015	Polychronis Tzortzakis	Ioannis Tamouridis	Stylianos Farantakis
2016	Ioannis Tamouridis	Polychronis Tzortzakis	Stylianos Farantakis
2017	Charalampos Kastrantas	Stylianos Farantakis	Polychronis Tzortzakis
2018	Polychronis Tzortzakis	Stylianos Farantakis	Charalampos Kastrantas
2019	Stylianos Farantakis	Polychronis Tzortzakis	Periklis Ilias
2020	Periklis Ilias	Stylianos Farantakis	Polychronis Tzortzakis
2021	Georgios Boutopoulos	Nikolaos Drakos	Panagiotis Christopoulos-Cheller
2022	Georgios Bouglas	Panagiotis Christopoulos-Cheller	Polychronis Tzortzakis
2023	Georgios Bouglas	Nikolaos Drakos	Charalampos Kastrantas
2024	Nikiforos Arvanitou	Georgios Bouglas	Emiliano Vila
2025	Nikiforos Arvanitou	Georgios Bouglas	Miltiadis Giannoutsos

=== Under 23 ===
Year	Gold	Silver	Bronze
2012	Alexandros Papaderos	Ioannis Spanopoulos	Nikolaos Ioannidis
2014	Stylianos Farantakis	Ioannis Spanopoulos	Alexandros Vrochidis
2015	Stylianos Farantakis	Nikolaos Ioannidis	Michail Mavrikakis
2016	Stylianos Farantakis	Michail Mavrikakis	Anastasios Koumpetsos
2019	Emiliano Vila	Miltiadis Giannoutsos	Georgios Stavrakakis
2020	Dimitrios Christakos	Ioannis Kiriakidis	Nikolaos Tsapas
2021	Panagiotis Karatsivis	Nikolaos Drakos	Georgios Kaloniatis
2022	Andreas Katopis	Sarris Evangelos	Ioannis Davarias
2023	Nikiforos Arvanitou	Nikolaos Drakos	Ioannis Davarias
2024	Nikiforos Arvanitou	Nikolaos Drakos	Dionysios Douzas
2025	Nikiforos Arvanitou	Nikolaos Manthos	Konstantinos Berdempes

== Women ==
=== Elite ===
Greek National Road Race Championships – Women's elite race
Race details
- Region: Greece
- Discipline: Road bicycle racing
- Type: One-day

History
- First edition: 2000
- Editions: 26 (as of 2025)
- First winner: Rita Ellinikaki
- Most wins: Argiro Milaki (7 wins)
- Most recent: Argiro Milaki

Year	Gold	Silver	Bronze
2000	Rita Ellinikaki	Anastasia Pastourmatzi	Eleni Diakaki
2001	Eleni Diakaki	Chalime Giourbouz	Eleni Govina
2002	Rita Ellinikaki	Anastasia Pastourmatzi	Ntonka Driva Balabanova
2003	Rita Ellinikakis	Marina Pargiou	Ntonka Driva Balabanova
2004	Anastasia Pastourmatzi	Chalime Giourbouz	Elissavet Chantzi
2005	Anastasia Pastourmatzi	Chalime Giourbouz	Elissavet Chantzi
2006	Anastasia Pastourmatzi	Elissavet Chantzi	Eleni Michali Tsavari
2007	Anastasia Pastourmatzi	Elissavet Chantzi	Eleni Michali Tsavari
2008	Anastasia Pastourmatzi	Elissavet Chantzi	Athina Chatzistyli
2009	Elissavet Chantzi	Athina Chatzistyli	Dimitra Plesioti
2010	Elissavet Chantzi	Eleni Michali Tsavari	Athina Chatzistyli
2011	Elissavet Chantzi	Eleni Michali Tsavari	Varvara Fasoi
2012	Elissavet Chantzi	Argiro Milaki	Varvara Fasoi
2013	Eleni Michali Tsavari	Despoina Tsemedzidou	Varvara Fasoi
2014	Varvara Fasoi	Eleni Michali Tsavari	Despoina Tsemedzidou
2015	Argiro Milaki	Varvara Fasoi	Eleni Michali Tsavari
2016	Varvara Fasoi	Eleni Michali Tsavari	Maria Theoxari
2017	Argiro Milaki	Varvara Fasoi	Anna Maria Zogli
2018	Argiro Milaki	Varvara Fasoi	Konstantina Sintzanaki
2019	Argiro Milaki	Varvara Fasoi	Anna Maria Zogli
2020	Athina Chatzistyli	Varvara Fasoi	Argiro Milaki
2021	Varvara Fasoi	Sofia Liodaki	Eirini Maria Karousou
2022	Varvara Fasoi	Aikaterini Eleftheriadou	Argiro Milaki
2023	Argiro Milaki	Aikaterini Eleftheriadou	Maria Ioanna Giampani
2024	Argiro Milaki	Eirini Papadimitrioy	Varvara Fasoi
2025	Argiro Milaki	Varvara Fasoi	Eleftheria Giachou

== See also ==
- Greek National Time Trial Championships
- National road cycling championships
