= Charalampos Kastrantas =

Greek cyclist (born 1991)

Personal information
- Born: 13 March 1991 (age 35) Tripoli, Greece

Cycling career
- Sport: Cycling
- Discipline: Road
- Role: Rider

Amateur teams
- 2014–2015: CC Villeneuve Saint-Germain
- 2020: Alfa Cycling Team

Professional teams
- 2011: Partizan Powermove
- 2012–2013: Gios–Deyser Leon Kastro
- 2017–2018: Dare Viator Partizan
- 2019: Brunei Continental Cycling Team
- 2021–2022: Kuwait Pro Cycling Team

Charalampos Kastrantas (born 13 March 1991) is a Greek cyclist, who last rode for UCI Continental team Kuwait Pro Cycling Team.

== Major results ==
2012
1st Young rider classification Tour of Greece
3rd Road race, National Road Championships
3rd Grand Prix Dobrich II
2013
9th Road race, Mediterranean Games
2014
4th Road race, National Road Championships
2015
Tour of Aegean

1st Points classification
1st Mountains classification

2nd Belgrade–Banja Luka I
10th Overall Tour of Torku Mevlana
2017
National Road Championships

1st Road race
2nd Time trial

1st Overall Tour de Serbie
2018
1st Overall Grand Prix International de la ville d'Alger

1st Points classification
1st Stage 4

1st Stage 3 Tour de Indonesia
National Road Championships

3rd Road race
3rd Time trial

7th Overall Ronde de l'Oise
2019
1st Overall Tour of Kosovo

1st Points classification
1st Stages 1, 2 & 3

2nd International Rhodes Grand Prix
National Road Championships

4th Road race
5th Time trial

6th Bursa Yildirim Bayezit Race
6th Bursa Orhangazi Race
10th Overall Tour of Peninsular
2020
6th International Rhodes Grand Prix
7th Overall In the footsteps of the Romans
2021
4th Time trial, National Road Championships
