= Varvara Fasoi =

Greek cyclist (born 1991)

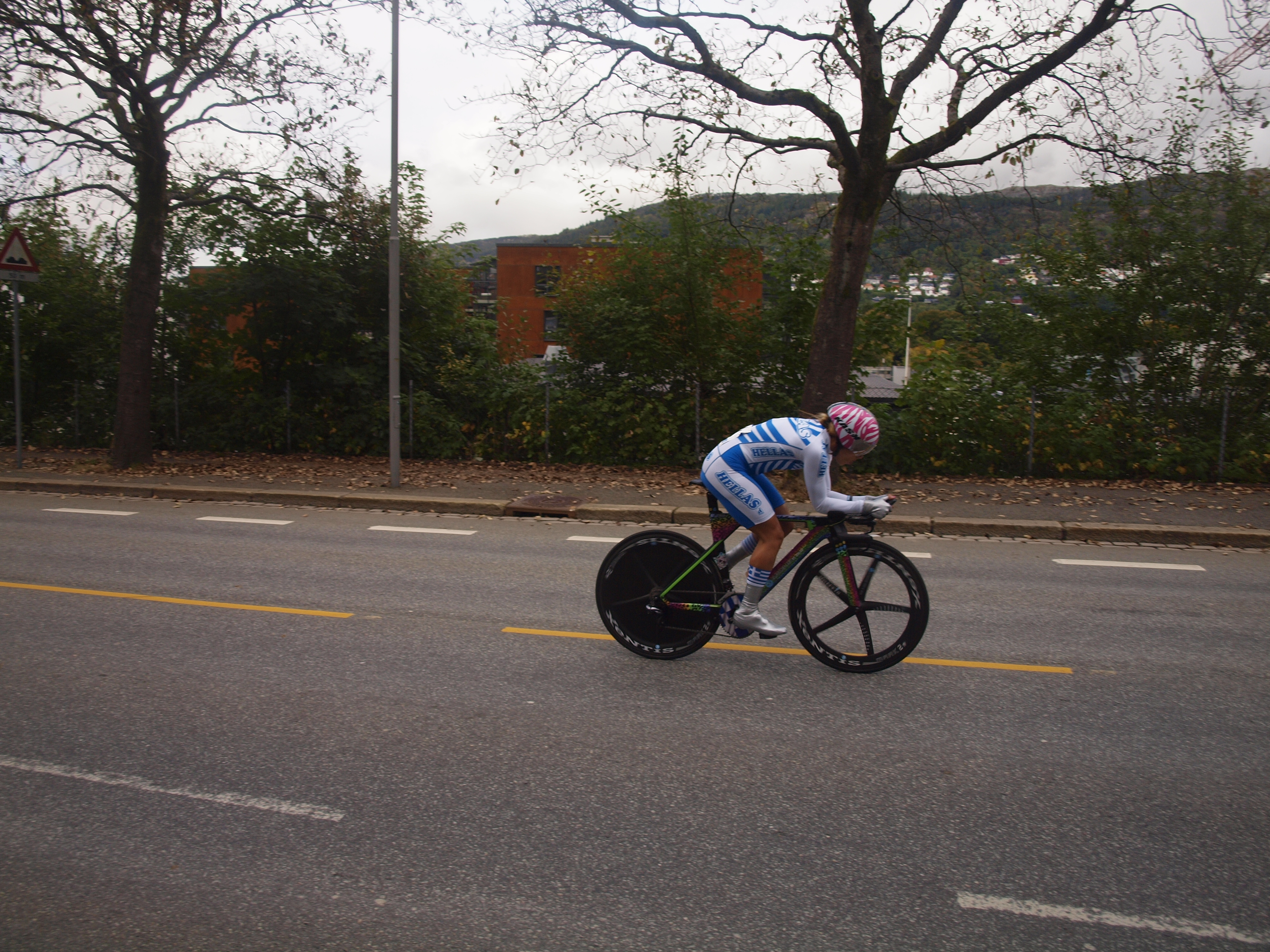
- Fasoi at the 2017 UCI Road World Championships

Personal information
- Full name: Varvara Fasoi
- Born: 2 February 1991 (age 35) Greece

Cycling career
- Sport: Cycling
- Current team: Panathinaikos
- Disciplines: Road; Track; Mountain biking
- Role: Rider

Professional teams
- 2019–2022: Eneicat
- 2022–: Panathinaikos

Varvara Fasoi (Greek: Βαρβάρα Φασόη; born 2 February 1991) is a Greek cyclist, who, as of December 2022, competes for Panathinaikos cycling team of Greece.

== Career ==
Between 2019 and 2022 she rode for UCI Women's Continental Team Eneicat–RBH Global–Martín Villa. She competed at the UCI Road World Championships on five occasions between 2014 and 2019.

== Major results ==
=== Road ===
2007
National Novices Road Championships

3rd Road race
3rd Time trial

2008
National Junior Road Championships

2nd Time trial
3rd Road race

2011
3rd Road race, National Road Championships
2012
3rd Road race, National Road Championships
2013
National Road Championships

3rd Road race
3rd Time trial

2014
National Road Championships

1st Road race
3rd Time trial

2015
National Road Championships

1st Time trial
2nd Road race

2016
National Road Championships

1st Road race
2nd Time trial

2017
National Road Championships

2nd Road race
2nd Time trial

2018
National Road Championships

1st Time trial
2nd Road race

5th Time trial, Mediterranean Games
2019
2nd Road race, National Road Championships
6th Tour of Arava
2020
National Road Championships

1st Time trial
2nd Road race

2021
1st Road race, National Road Championships
2022
National Road Championships

1st Road race
2nd Time trial

9th Road race, Mediterranean Games

=== Track ===
2006
National Novices Track Championships

3rd Individual pursuit
3rd 500m time trial

2014
National Track Championships

1st 500m time trial
2nd Scratch

2015
National Track Championships

2nd 500m time trial
2nd Scratch
2nd Individual pursuit

2016
National Track Championships

2nd 500m time trial
3rd Keirin
3rd Individual pursuit

2018
National Track Championships

1st Individual pursuit
2nd 500m time trial

2020
3rd Individual pursuit, National Track Championships

=== Mountain biking ===
2006
3rd Cross-country, National Novices Mountain Bike Championships
2015
National Mountain Bike Championships

1st Cross-country marathon
1st Cross-country

1st Cross-country, Sfendami
1st Cross-country marathon, Sfendami
3rd Chalkidiki Mountainbike
3rd Naousa Mountainbike
2016
1st Lamia Mountainbike
2nd Cross-country eliminator, Balkan Mountain Bike Championships
2nd Polonezköy Mountainbike
2017
1st Alterbiketours Tours Sparti Peter and Pauls
2020
1st Cross-country, National Mountain Bike Championships
2021
1st Cross-country, National Mountain Bike Championships
2022
National Mountain Bike Championships

2nd Cross-country
3rd Cross-country marathon
