= Polychronis Tzortzakis =

Greek cyclist (born 1989)

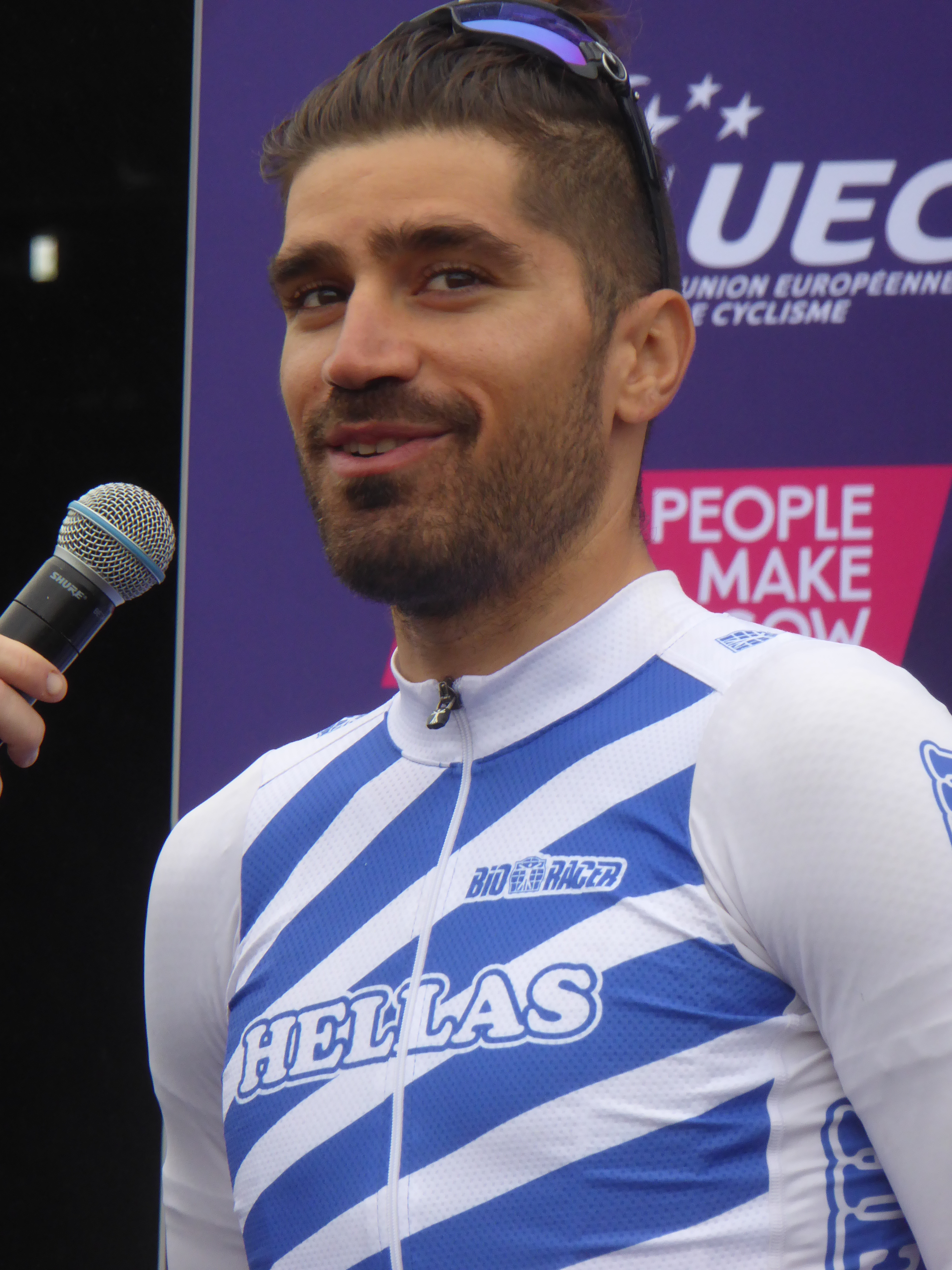
- Tzortzakis at the 2018 European Road Cycling Championships

Personal information
- Full name: Polychronis Tzortzakis; Greek: Πολυχρόνης Τζωρτζάκης
- Nickname: Pol
- Born: 3 January 1989 (age 37) Chania, Greece
- Height: 1.86 m (6 ft 1 in)
- Weight: 80 kg (176 lb)

Cycling career
- Sport: Cycling
- Disciplines: Road; Track
- Role: Rider
- Rider type: Sprinter

Amateur teams
- 2012–2013: Guidon Chalettois
- 2014: Team UC Nantes Atlantique
- 2015–2016: CC Villeneuve Saint-Germain
- 2020: Alfa Cycling Team
- 2023: PS Kronos

Professional teams
- 2010–2011: Heraklion Kastro–Murcia
- 2017: RTS–Monton Racing Team
- 2018–2019: Tarteletto–Isorex
- 2021–2022: Kuwait Pro Cycling Team
- 2023–2024: Roojai Online Insurance

Polychronis Tzortzakis (Greek: Πολυχρόνης Τζωρτζάκης; born 3 January 1989) is a Greek road and track cyclist, who most recently rode for UCI Continental team Roojai Insurance. Representing Greece, he competed in the team pursuit event at the 2010 and 2011 UCI Track Cycling World Championships.

== Major results ==
2006
2nd Road race, National Junior Road Championships
2007
1st Road race, National Junior Road Championships
2009
7nd Road race, National Road Championships
2010
National Road Championships

1st Under-23 time trial
2nd Road race

2011
National Road Championships

1st Under-23 time trial
3rd Road race

6th Overall Tour of Greece
9th Points race, UCI Track Cycling World Championships
2012
1st Stage 2 Trophée de l'Essor
2nd Time trial, National Road Championships
2013
1st Stage 1 Tour du Loiret
1st Stage 1 Tour Nivernais Morvan
1st Boucles Dunoises
2nd Dijon–Auxonne–Dijon
National Road Championships

3rd Time trial
4th Road race

8th Time trial, Mediterranean Games
2014
National Road Championships

1st Time trial
5th Road race

1st La Castelbriantaise
2015
National Road Championships

1st Time trial
4th Road race

3rd Belgrade–Banja Luka I
6th Paris–Mantes-en-Yvelines
2016
National Road Championships

2nd Time trial
2nd Road race

4th Belgrade–Banja Luka I
7th Belgrade–Banja Luka II
2017
National Road Championships

1st Time trial
3rd Road race

10th Hong Kong Challenge
2018
National Road Championships

1st Road race
2nd Time trial

8th Time trial, Mediterranean Games
2019
National Road Championships

1st Time trial
2nd Road race

1st Overall Tour d'Egypte

1st Prologue

1st Overall In the steps of Romans

1st Stage 1

Tour du Maroc

1st Points classification
1st Stages 7 & 8

4th Bursa Orhangazi Race
6th International Rhodes Grand Prix
7th Bursa Yildirim Bayezit Race
2020
National Road Championships

1st Time trial
3rd Road race

2021
1st Time trial, National Road Championships
Tour de Guadeloupe

1st Points classification
1st Stages 3 & 5

3rd Overall Tour of Estonia
2022
National Road Championships

3rd Road race
4th Time Trial

10th Time trial, Mediterranean Games
10th Overall Tour of Thailand
2023
1st Syedra Ancient City
National Road Championships

2nd Time trial
4th Road race

3rd The Tour Oqtosh–Chorvoq - Mountain II
5th Hong Kong Cyclothon
9th Overall Tour of Albania

1st Stage 5

9th Overall Tour of Taihu Lake
2024
1st Time trial, National Road Championships
