= Georgios Bouglas =

Greek cyclist (born 1990)

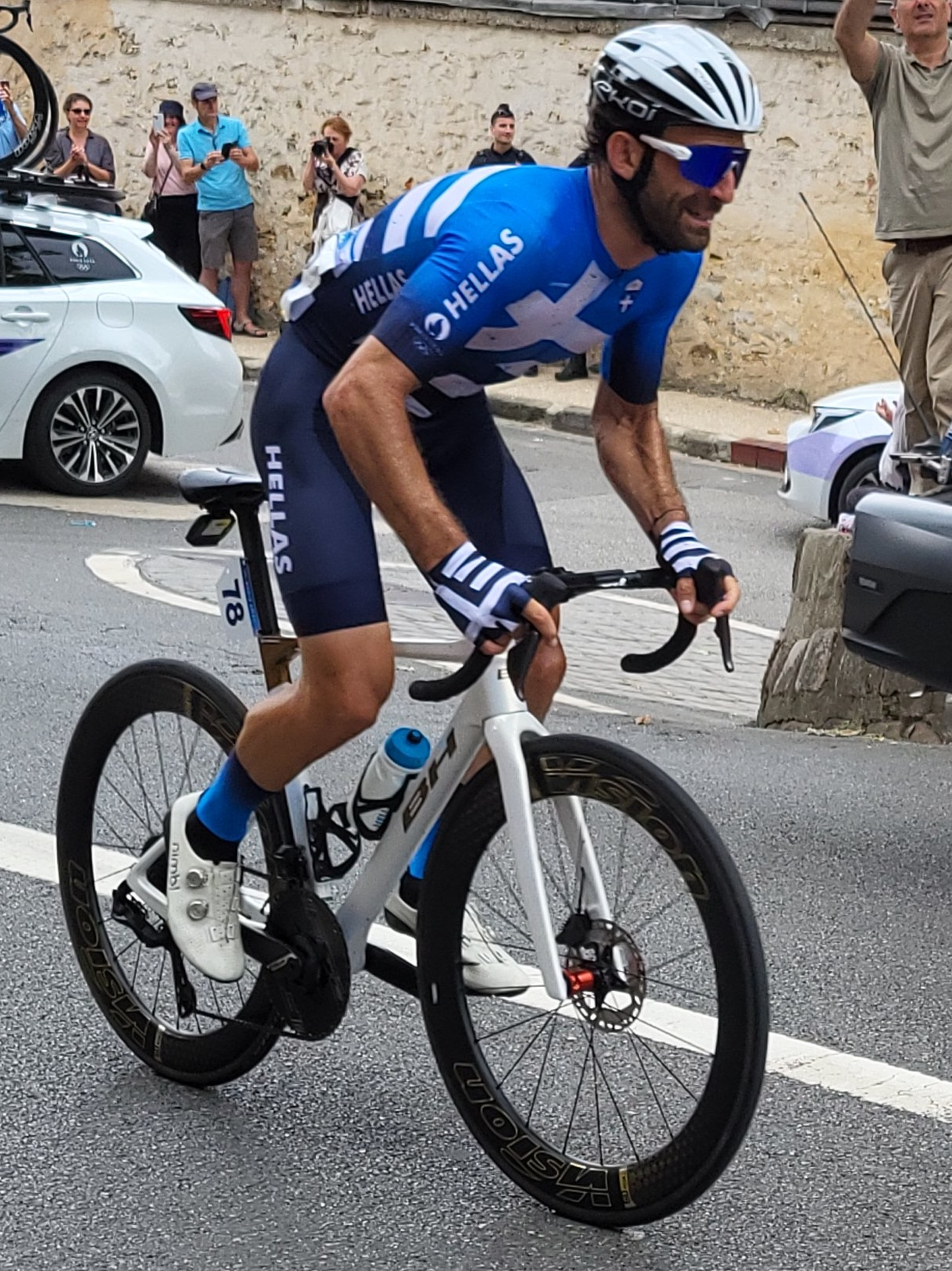
- Bouglas at the 2024 Olympics

Personal information
- Full name: Georgios Bouglas; Greek: Γεώργιος Μπούγλας
- Born: 17 November 1990 (age 35) Trikala, Greece
- Height: 1.81 m (5 ft 11 in)
- Weight: 71 kg (157 lb)

Cycling career
- Sport: Cycling
- Current team: Burgos Burpellet BH
- Discipline: Road
- Role: Rider
- Rider type: Sprinter

Professional teams
- 2009–2012: Heraklion–Nessebar
- 2013–2014: SP Tableware
- 2016–2017: China Continental Team of Gansu Bank
- 2018–2019: Ningxia Sports Lottery–Livall Cycling Team
- 2020: SSOIS Miogee Cycling Team
- 2021: Salcano–Sakarya BB Team
- 2022: Spor Toto Cycling Team
- 2023: Matrix Powertag
- 2024–: Burgos BH

Georgios Bouglas (Greek: Γεώργιος Μπούγλας; born 17 November 1990) is a Greek racing cyclist, who currently rides for UCI ProTeam Burgos Burpellet BH.

== Major results ==
2011
10th Banja Luka–Belgrade I
2012
National Road Championships

1st Under-23 road race
2nd Road race

2013
Tour of Romania

1st Stages 2 & 5

2nd Road race, National Road Championships
6th Memorial Oleg Dyachenko
9th Overall Grand Prix of Sochi
2014
1st Road race, National Road Championships
1st Madison, National Track Championships (with Apostolos Boúglas)
2nd Banja Luka–Belgrade II
2016
3rd Time trial, National Road Championships
2017
8th International Rhodes Grand Prix
2018
1st Stage 1 Tour of Qinghai Lake
5th Road race, National Road Championships
8th International Rhodes Grand Prix
2019
1st Stage 5 Tour of Qinghai Lake
National Road Championships

2nd Time trial
5th Road race

2nd Bursa Orhangazi Race
3rd Grand Prix Minsk
5th Bursa Yildirim Bayezit Race
6th Minsk Cup
2020
5th Overall Tour of Mevlana
2021
1st Stage 2 In the footsteps of the Romans
2nd GP Mediterranean
9th Grand Prix Gazipaşa
10th GP Manavgat
2022
National Road Championships

1st Road race
3rd Time trial

4th Grand Prix Gazipaşa
8th International Rhodes Grand Prix
9th Grand Prix Megasaray
2023
1st Road race, National Road Championships
1st International Criterium in Sakai
1st Stage 2 Tour of Japan
10th Overall Tour of Sharjah
