= Periklis Ilias =

Greek cyclist (born 1986)

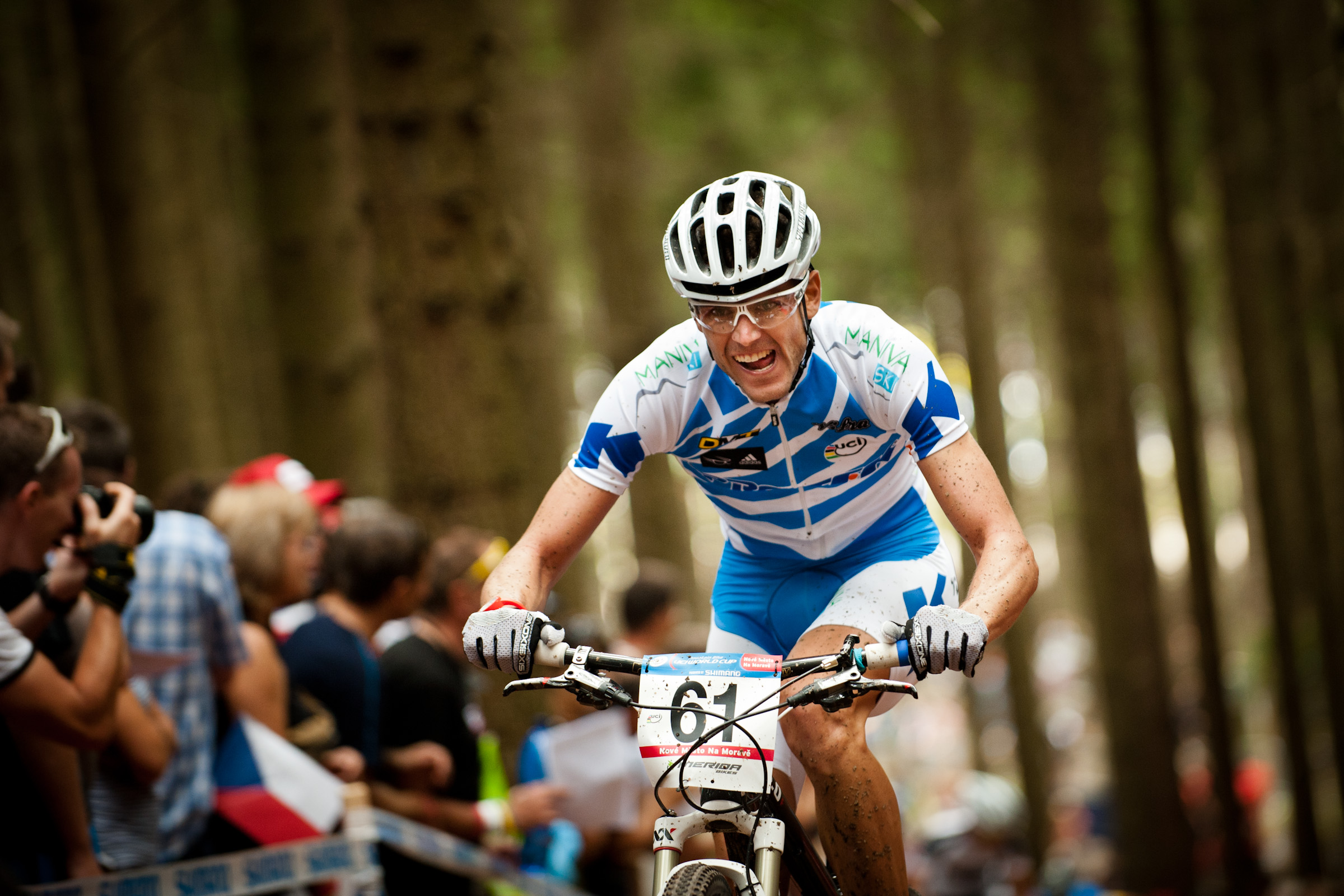
- Ilias in 2011

Personal information
- Full name: Periklis Ilias
- Born: 26 June 1986 (age 40) Athens, Greece
- Height: 1.83 m (6 ft 0 in)
- Weight: 69 kg (152 lb)

Cycling career
- Sport: Cycling
- Current team: PS Krónos
- Disciplines: Mountain bike, road
- Role: Rider
- Rider type: Cross-country and marathon

Amateur teams
- 2008–2010: ISD–International MTB
- 2017: SP Tableware
- 2019–: PS Krónos

Professional teams
- 2007: Technal Kastro
- 2011–2014: SP Tableware
Medal record
Representing Greece
Men's Mountain bike marathon
World Championships
Gold medal – first place	2012 Ornans	Men's race

Periklis Ilias (born 26 June 1986) is a Greek cross-country mountain biker and road cyclist. Periklis became World Champion at the 2012 UCI Mountain Bike Marathon World Championships which was held at Ornans, France.

At the 2012 Summer Olympics, he competed in the Men's cross-country at Hadleigh Farm, finishing in 33rd place.

== Major results ==
=== Road ===
2003
3rd Road race, National Junior Road Championships
2004
2nd Road race, National Junior Road Championships
2006
8th Overall Tour of Turkey
2007
1st Road race, National Road Championships
2008
1st Stage 2 Tour of Halkidiki
5th Road race, National Road Championships
2010
National Road Championships

3rd Time trial
4th Road race

2012
4th Overall Tour d'Algérie
7th Overall Tour of Hellas

1st Stage 3

2017
5th Overall Tour of Albania
10th Overall Tour de Serbie
2019
3rd Road race, National Road Championships
2020
National Road Championships

1st Road race
5th Time trial

2022
1st Time trial, National Road Championships
2023
1st The Tour Oqtosh – Chorvoq – Mountain II
3rd Syedra Ancient City
3rd Overall Tour of Albania

1st Mountains classification

5th Tour of Bostonliq II
5th Time trial, National Road Championships
8th Overall Kırıkkale Road Race
10th The Tour Oqtosh – Chorvoq – Mountain

=== Mountain ===
2005
1st Cross-country, National Mountain-bike Championships
2006
1st Cross-country, National Mountain-bike Championships
2007
1st Cross-country, National Mountain-bike Championships
2009
1st Cross-country, National Mountain-bike Championships
2010
1st Cross-country, National Mountain-bike Championships
2011
1st Cross-country, National Mountain-bike Championships
2012
1st Marathon, UCI World Championships
2013
1st Cross-country, National Mountain-bike Championships
2014
1st Cross-country, National Mountain-bike Championships
2015
1st Marathon, National Mountain-bike Championships
2017
1st Marathon, National Mountain-bike Championships
