= Apostolos Boúglas =

Greek cyclist (born 1989)

Personal information
- Full name: Apostolos Boúglas
- Born: 16 March 1989 (age 37) Trikala

Cycling career
- Sport: Cycling
- Discipline: Road
- Role: Rider

Professional teams
- 2008–2012: Cosmote Kastro
- 2013–2014: SP Tableware

Apostolos Boúglas (Greek: Γεώργιος Μπούγλας; born 16 March 1989 in Trikala) is a Greek road and track cyclist, who last rode for UCI Continental team SP Tableware. He became professional in 2008, and is the older brother of Georgios Bouglas – who like his brother – is a professional cyclist.

== Major results ==
2010
2nd National Time Trial Championships
2012
6th Grand Prix Dobrich II
2013
3rd National Road Race Championships
8th Overall Grand Prix of Sochi
2014
1st National Madison Championships (with Georgios Bouglas)
2nd National Road Race Championships
4th Banja Luka–Belgrade I
4th Grand Prix of Moscow
10th Mayor Cup
