= Colin Stüssi =

Swiss cyclist

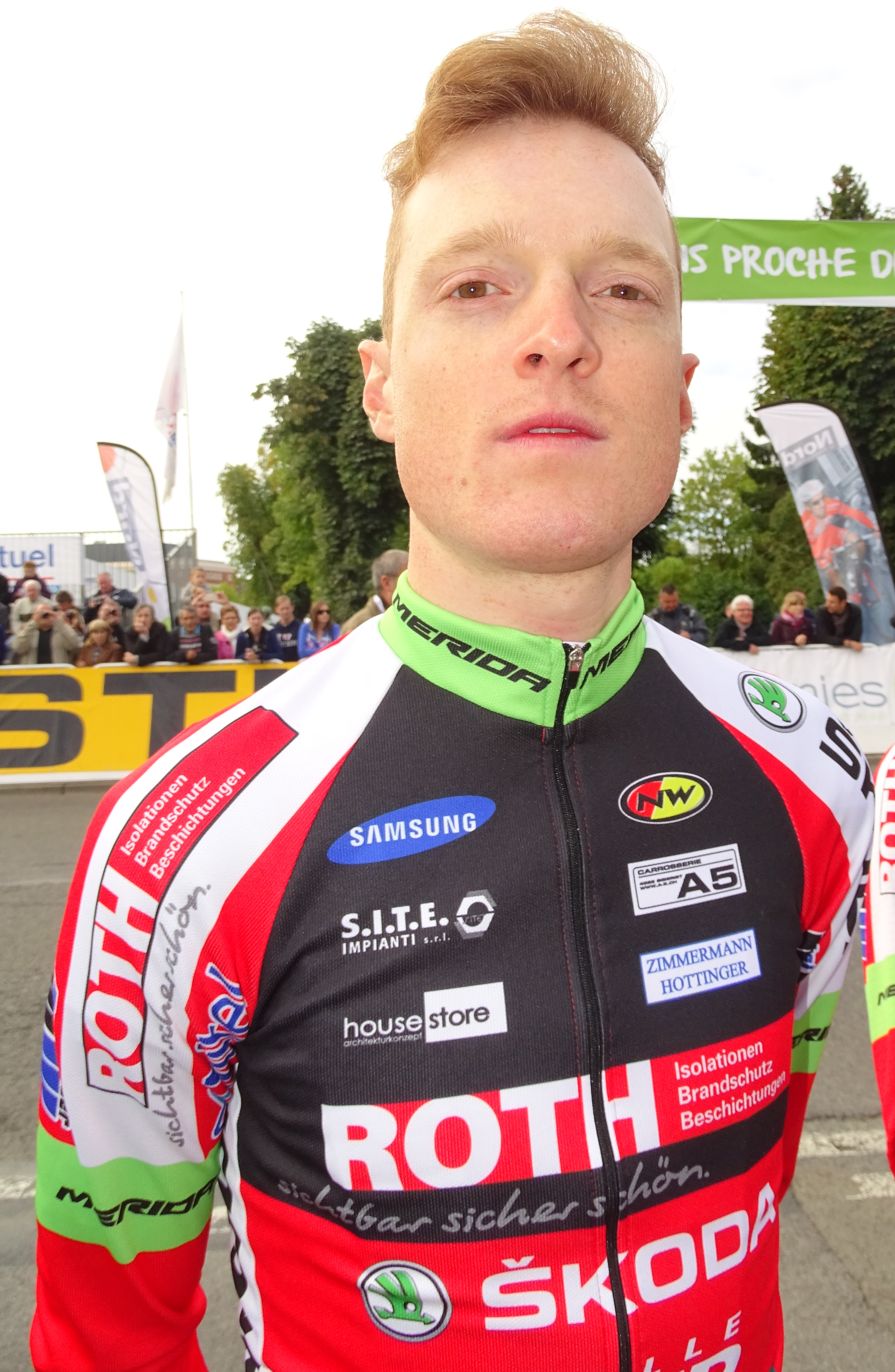
- Stüssi in September 2015

Personal information
- Full name: Colin Chris Stüssi
- Born: 4 June 1993 (age 33) Glarus, Switzerland
- Height: 1.87 m (6 ft 2 in)
- Weight: 68 kg (150 lb)

Cycling career
- Sport: Cycling
- Current team: Team Vorarlberg
- Discipline: Road
- Role: Rider

Professional teams
- 2015–2017: Roth–Škoda
- 2018: Amore & Vita–Prodir
- 2019–: Team Vorarlberg Santic

Colin Chris Stüssi (born 4 June 1993) is a Swiss cyclist, who currently rides for UCI Continental team Team Vorarlberg.

Stüssi at 2025 Tour of Romania

== Major results ==
2013
2nd Road race, National Under-23 Road Championships
2014
8th Trofeo Città di San Vendemiano
2015
3rd Giro del Friuli Venezia Giulia

1st Young rider classification

2016
1st Young rider classification, Giro di Toscana
2017
1st Overall Tour of Rhodes

1st Stage 1

2nd Overall Sibiu Cycling Tour
4th Famenne Ardenne Classic
4th Overall Tour of Almaty
5th Overall Le Tour de Savoie Mont Blanc
8th Overall Tour du Gévaudan Languedoc-Roussillon
8th Overall Tour Alsace
2018
6th Overall Tour of Almaty
2019
1st Stage 2 Tour de Savoie Mont Blanc
1st Mountains classification, Tour of Rhodes
5th Paris–Bourges
2020
6th Overall Tour of Rhodes
2021
1st Mountains classification, Okolo Jižních Čech
2022
3rd Road race, National Road Championships
2023 (2 pro wins)
1st Overall Volta a Portugal

1st Stage 7

4th Overall Oberösterreich Rundfahrt
8th Overall Tour of Rhodes

1st Mountains classification

2024 (1)
2nd Overall Volta a Portugal

1st Stage 1

3rd Overall International Tour of Rhodes
10th Overall Flèche du Sud
2025
5th Overall International Tour of Hellas
9th Overall Tour Alsace
