= Team Vorarlberg =

Austrian cycling team

Team information
- UCI code: VOL (2002–2005, 2016–2018); VBG (2006–2015, 2019–)
- Registered: Austria
- Founded: 1999
- Discipline: Road
- Status: Continental

Key personnel
- General manager: Thomas Kofler
- Team managers: Florent Horeau; Cornel Enzler; Johann Innerhofer; Johannes Kofler; Jürgen Schatzmann; René Stüssi

Team name history
- 1999–2000 2001 2002–2003 2004–2005 2005–2008 2009–2010 2011–2017 2018–2020 2021–: ÖAMTC Volksbank–Colnago; Volksbank–Schwinn; Volksbank–Ideal (VOL); Volksbank–Ideal Leingruber (VOL); Volksbank–Vorarlberg; Vorarlberg–Corratec (VBG); Team Vorarlberg; Team Vorarlberg Santic; Team Vorarlberg (VBG)

Team Vorarlberg (UCI team code: VBG) is a cycling team based in Austria. The team was founded in 1999 by the twin brothers Thomas Kofler and Johannes Kofler and previously known as Team Volksbank. In 2009, the Austrian federal state of Vorarlberg replaced Volksbank as title sponsor. In 2006 it became the first ever Austrian professional cycling team and was registered as a UCI Professional Continental team until June 2010, when their UCI license was suspended due to financial insecurity. The team was later re-registered as a UCI Continental team, and retained that status in 2011.

In 2007, the team received international attention when former German Tour de France-winner Jan Ullrich announced to join the team in an official function after having been suspended by his T-Mobile Team due to his involvement in the Operación Puerto doping case. After pressure from the team's sponsors, the plan was discarded.

Team Vorarlberg was the first Austrian cycling team to participate in events of the UCI ProTour, the top tier racing league in professional cycling. It did so by receiving a wild card for the 2007 Deutschland Tour, also returning in 2008 with Daniel Musiol winning the mountains classification. From 2007 to 2009 it also raced three times at the Tour de Suisse (winning the sprint classification both with Florian Stalder in 2007 and with René Weissinger in 2008) as well as joining the 2009 Tour of Flanders. Other notable results besides several national champion titles include the overall victory at the 2015 Tour of Austria by Victor de la Parte and the 2023 Volta a Portugal by Colin Stüssi.

== Team roster ==
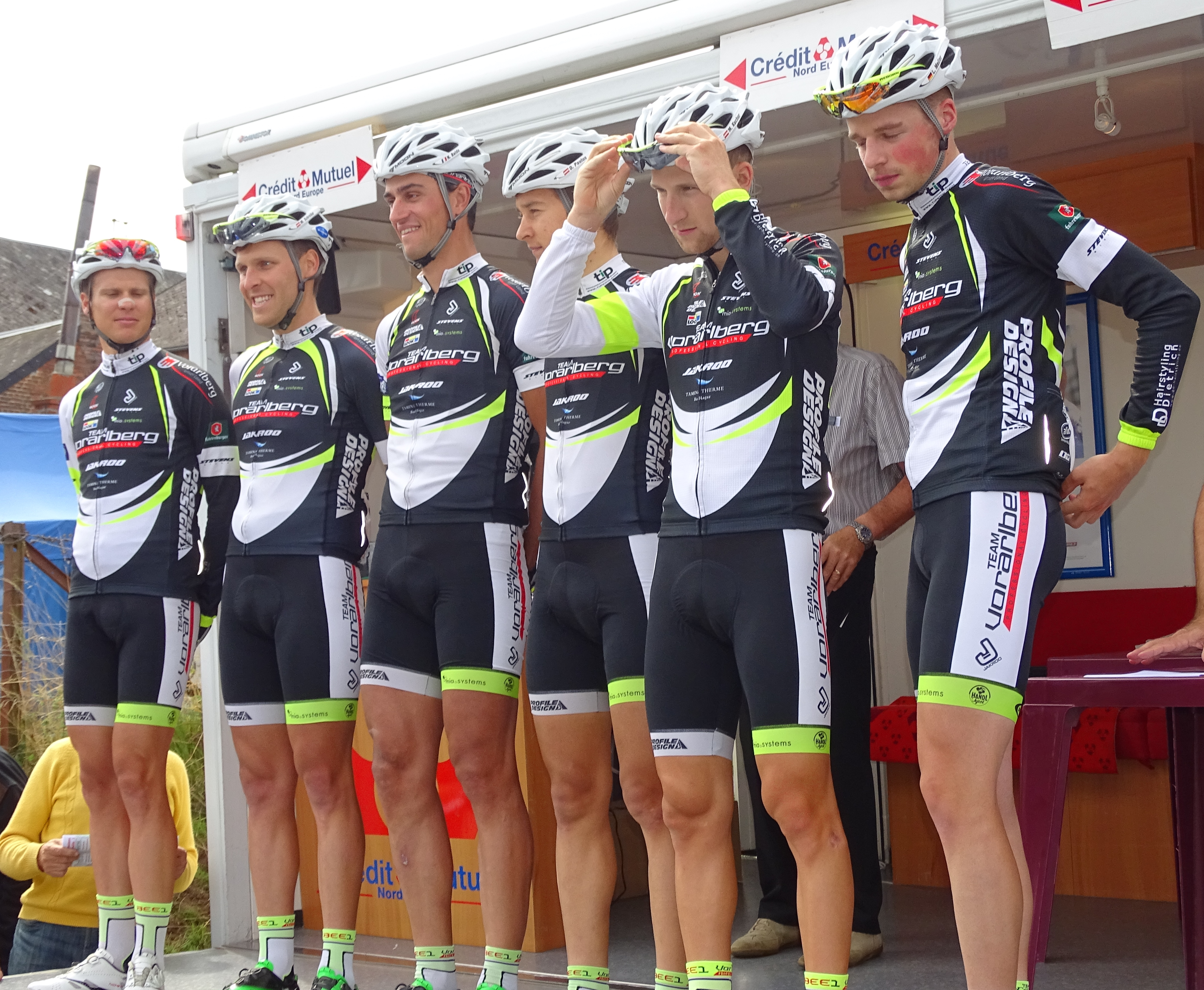
The team at the 2015 Grand Prix des Marbriers.

As of 23 May 2023.

Rider	Date of birth
Dominik Amann (AUT)	12 February 1999 (age 27)
Pirmin Benz (GER)	26 November 2000 (age 25)
Antoine Berlin (MON)	2 August 1989 (age 37)
Óscar Cabedo (ESP)	12 November 1994 (age 31)
Peter Inauen (SUI)	28 July 1996 (age 30)
Jon Knolle (GER)	11 September 1999 (age 26)
Lukas Meiler (GER)	14 February 1995 (age 31)

Rider	Date of birth
Laurin Nenning (AUT)	25 September 2004 (age 21)
Nikolas Riegler (AUT)	15 September 2001 (age 24)
Lukas Rüegg (SUI)	9 September 1996 (age 29)
Linus Stari (AUT)	4 January 1998 (age 28)
Colin Stüssi (SUI)	4 June 1993 (age 33)
Moran Vermeulen (AUT)	14 June 1997 (age 29)

== Major wins ==
2002
Ireland Time Trial Championship, David McCann
Poreč Trophy 6, Fraser MacMaster
Stage 3 International Tour of Rhodes, Vasilis Anastopoulos
Manx International, David McCann
2003
Prologue Istrian Spring Trophy, Jean Nuttli
Sacrifice Cup, Philippe Schnyder
Overall Tour of Greece, Vasilis Anastopoulos

Stage 2, Vasilis Anastopoulos

Stage 5, Tour of Slovenia, Jure Golčer
Overall Brandenburg–Rundfahrt, Jean Nuttli

Stage 1b, Jean Nuttli

Duo Normand, Jean Nuttli & Philippe Schnyder
2004
Greece Road Race Championship, Vasilis Anastopoulos
Austria Road Race Championship, Harald Morscher
Köln-Bonn, Pascal Hungerbühler
2005
Greece Road Race Championship, Vasilis Anastopoulos
Tour de Berne, René Weissinger
2007
Stage 6 Tour of Austria, Gerrit Glomser
2008
Stage 2 Bayern–Rundfahrt, Olaf Pollack
2009
Stage 8 Tour of Turkey, Sebastian Siedler
Stage 6 Danmark Rundt, Sebastian Siedler
2010
Stage 2 Oberösterreich Rundfahrt, Josef Benetseder
2012
Slovenia Time Trial Championship, Robert Vrečer
Stage 3 Tour du Loir-et-Cher, Robert Vrečer
Overall Tour of Greece, Robert Vrečer

Stage 1, Robert Vrečer

Overall Oberösterreich Rundfahrt, Robert Vrečer

Stage 1, Robert Vrečer

Stage 1 Tour du Gévaudan Languedoc-Roussillon, Robert Vrečer
2013
Stage 1 Oberösterreich Rundfahrt, Florian Bissinger
2014
Stage 5 Tour de Taiwan, Fabian Schnaidt
Stage 2 Paris–Arras Tour, Fabian Schnaidt
Stages 1 & 6 Tour of Iran, Fabian Schnaidt
Stage 5 Tour of China I, Grischa Janorschke
2015
Paris–Mantes-en-Yvelines, Nicolas Baldo
Overall Flèche du Sud, Víctor de la Parte
Stage 1 Oberösterreich Rundfahrt, Víctor de la Parte
Overall Tour of Austria, Víctor de la Parte

Stages 4 & 6 Tour of Austria, Víctor de la Parte

2018
Switzerland U23 National Time Trial Championships, Lukas Rüegg
Stages 3 (ITT) & 4 Tour de Savoie Mont-Blanc, Patrick Schelling
Stage 2 Kreiz Breizh Elites, Jannik Steimle
Prologue Tour de Hongrie, Patrick Schelling
Stage 3 (ITT) Okolo Jižních Čech, Patrick Schelling
Stage 5 Okolo Jižních Čech, Jannik Steimle
2019
Stage 1a (ITT) Szlakiem Grodów Piastowskich, Jannik Steimle
Stage 4 Flèche du Sud, Jannik Steimle
Overall Oberösterreich Rundfahrt, Jannik Steimle

Stage 1, Jannik Steimle

Stage 2 Tour de Savoie Mont-Blanc, Colin Stüssi
Prologue & Stage 5 Tour of Austria, Jannik Steimle
2021
Stage 1 Istrian Spring Trophy, Filippo Fortin
Overall Oberösterreich Rundfahrt, Alexis Guérin

Stage 3, Alexis Guérin

Stage 4 Tour de Savoie Mont-Blanc, Alexis Guérin
2022
Prologue International Tour of Rhodes, Lukas Meiler
2023
Overall Volta a Portugal, Colin Stüssi

Stage 7, Colin Stüssi

== National Champions ==
2002
Ireland Time Trial Championship, David McCann
2004
Greece Road Race Championship, Vasilis Anastopoulos
Austria Road Race Championship, Harald Morscher
2005
Greece Road Race Championship, Vasilis Anastopoulos
2012
Slovenia Time Trial Championship, Robert Vrečer

== Known former riders ==
- (Denmark) Michael Rasmussen (1999)
- (United States) Tyson Apostol (2005-2007)
- (Austria) Stefan Denifl (2006)
- (Austria) Harald Morscher (2006–2009)
- (Austria) Gerrit Glomser (2006–2008)
- (Germany) Sven Teutenberg (2006–2007)
- (Germany) Olaf Pollack (2008)
- (Switzerland) Reto Hollenstein (2009-2011)
- (Austria) René Haselbacher (2009–2010)
- (Germany) Sebastian Siedler (2009–2010)
- (Switzerland) Silvan Dillier (2011)
- (Germany) René Weissinger (2004–2005 and 2007–2012)
- (Slovenia) Robert Vrečer (2012 and 2014)
- (Spain) Victor de la Parte (2015)
