= Argiro Milaki =

Belarusian cyclist (born 1998)

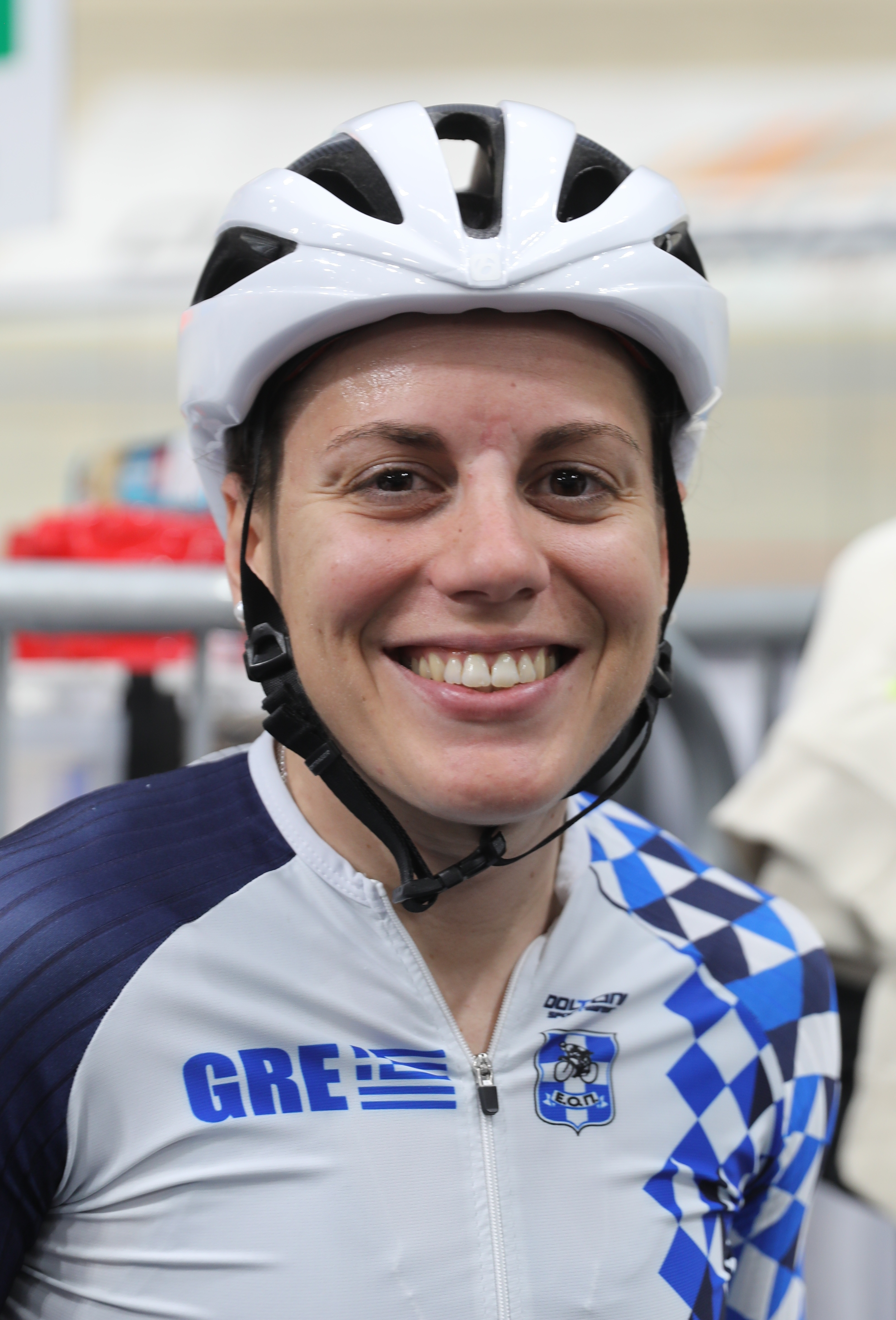
- Milaki in 2024

Personal information
- Born: 3 July 1992 (age 34) Heraklion, Greece

Cycling career
- Sport: Cycling
- Current team: Aromitalia Vaiano
- Disciplines: Road; Track
- Role: Rider

Amateur team
- 2019: Mexx–Watersley International WCT

Professional teams
- 2018: Servetto–Stradalli Cycle–Alurecycling
- 2021: Lviv Cycling Team
- 2023: Denver Disruptors
- 2024: BTC City Ljubljana Zhiraf Ambedo
- 2025–: Aromitalia 3T Vaiano

Argiro Milaki (born 3 July 1992) is a Greek racing cyclist, who currently rides for UCI Women's Continental Team Aromitalia Vaiano.

She is a seven time Greek national road race champion and two time time trial champion. She also competes in track cycling, where she has won a number of national titles in various events.

In 2012 and 2016, Milaki competed as a tandem pilot at the Paralympic Games, leading the visually impaired rider Adamantia Chalkiadaki. At the 2017 UCI Para-cycling Road World Championships, she finished third in the road race leading Eleni Kalatzi.

== Major results ==
=== Road ===
2012
National Championships

2nd Road race
5th Time trial

2015
1st Road race, National Championships
2017
1st Road race, National Championships
2018
National Championships

1st Road race
2nd Time trial

1st Stage 1 Tour of Zhoushan Island
7th Time trial, Mediterranean Games
7th Overall Panorama Guizhou International Women's Road Cycling Race
2019
National Championships

1st Road race
2nd Time trial

2020
National Championships

2nd Time trial
3rd Road race

2021
2nd Time trial, National Championships
2022
National Championships

1st Time trial
3rd Road race

5th Grand Prix Justiniano Race
2023
National Championships

1st Road race
1st Time trial

5th Overall Belgrade GP Woman Tour
2024
National Championships

1st Road race
2nd Time trial

9th Umag Trophy
2025
National Championships

1st Road race
2nd Time trial

2nd Road race, Balkan Championships

=== Track ===
2008
1st Individual pursuit, National Junior Championships
2014
National Championships

1st Scratch
1st Keirin

2015
National Championships

1st Scratch
1st Keirin

2018
National Championships

1st Omnium
1st Scratch
1st Keirin

2019
National Championships

1st Scratch
1st Keirin

2020
National Championships

1st Scratch
1st Omnium
1st Individual pursuit
1st Sprint

2021
1st Sprint, National Championships
2022
National Championships

1st Scratch
1st Keirin
1st Sprint

2023
National Championships

1st Scratch
1st Omnium
1st Individual pursuit
1st Sprint
1st Points race
1st Elimination race
1st Keirin

2024
National Championships

1st Omnium
1st Individual pursuit
1st Points race
1st Elimination race
