= Fraser MacMaster =

New Zealand cyclist

Personal information
- Full name: Fraser MacMaster
- Born: 14 December 1978 (age 47) Christchurch, New Zealand

Cycling career
- Sport: Cycling
- Current team: Retired
- Discipline: Road
- Role: Rider

Professional team
- 2002–2006: Vorarlberger

Fraser MacMaster (born 14 November 1978) is a retired New Zealand professional racing cyclist, who last rode for UCI Continental team Vorarlberger. MacMaster competed in the 4000m Individual Pursuit at the 1998 Commonwealth Games where he came 6th. Macmaster's greatest achievement is winning the overall at the Tour of Greece in 2002.

== Major results ==
2001
4th Time trial, National road championships
2002
1st Overall Tour of Greece

1st Stage 1

1st Porec Trophy VI
7th Radclassic - Gleisdorf
9th Tour du Lac Léman
2003
3rd Overall Tour of Southland

1st Stage 10

4th Time trial, National road championships
5th Sacrifice Cup
2004
9th Overall UAE International Emirates Post Tour
2005
2nd Overall Tour of Wellington
2006
10th Overall Tour of Southland
2007
1st Overall K2 road race Coromandel NZ
