= Ioannis Spanopoulos =

Greek cyclist (born 1993)

Personal information
- Born: 20 May 1993 (age 33) Athens, Greece

Cycling career
- Sport: Cycling
- Current team: Retired
- Disciplines: Road; Track
- Role: Rider

Amateur team
- 2015: Easton Ritte Road Racing Team

Professional teams
- 2013: Etcetera–Worldofbike
- 2016: Veranclassic–Ago

Ioannis Spanopoulos (born 20 May 1993) is a Greek professional racing cyclist. He rode at the 2015 UCI Track Cycling World Championships.

== Major results ==
2010
National Junior Road Championships

2nd Time trial
3rd Road race

2011
National Junior Road Championships

1st Time trial
1st Road race

2012
2nd Time trial, National Under-23 Road Championships
2013
1st Time trial, National Under-23 Road Championships
2014
2nd Road race, National Under-23 Road Championships
2015
3rd Time trial, National Road Championships
