= Nikiforos Arvanitou =

Greek cyclist (born 1990)

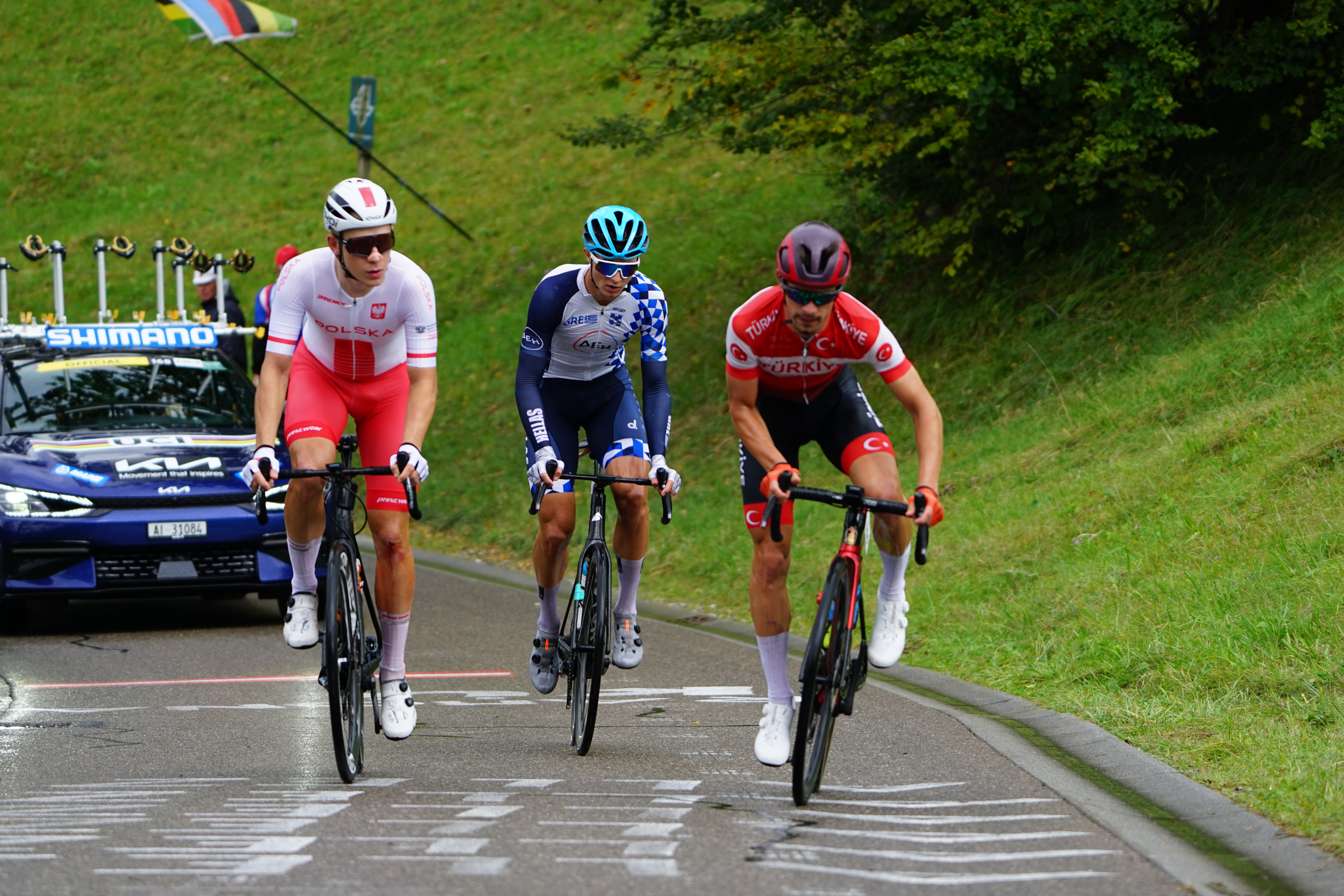
- Arvanitou (center) at the 2024 UCI Road World Championships

Personal information
- Born: 13 January 2003 (age 23) Athens, Greece
- Height: 1.84 m (6 ft 0 in)
- Weight: 71 kg (157 lb)

Cycling career
- Sport: Cycling
- Current team: XDS Astana Team
- Disciplines: Road; Track
- Role: Rider

Professional teams
- 2022: Java Kiwi Atlántico
- 2023: Sofer–Savini Due–OMZ
- 2024–2025: Novapor Speedbike Team
- 2025–2026: Team United Shipping
- 2026: XDS Astana Team (stagiaire)
- 2027-: XDS Astana Team

Major wins
- One-day races and Classics National Road Race Championships (2024, 2025, 2026)

Nikiforos Arvanitou (Greek: Νικηφόρος Αρβανίτου; born 13 January 2003) is a Greek racing cyclist, who currently rides for UCI WorldTeam XDS Astana Team. He is a three-time winner of the Greek National Road Race Championships.

From 1 August 2026, Arvanitou joins XDS Astana Team from UCI Continental team Team United Shipping as stagiaire until the end of the season, and represented them in some races while still being contracted to Team United Shipping. At the end of the season in October, he officially joined XDS Astana for a two year contract.

== Major results ==
2020
National Junior Road Championships

1st Road race
3rd Time trial

2021
National Junior Road Championships

1st Road race
1st Time trial

2022
5th Road race, National Road Championships
2023
Balkan Road Championships

1st Road race
5th Time trial

National Under-23 Road Championships

1st Road race
2nd Time trial

1st Overall Kırıkkale Road Race

1st Stage 1

1st Points classification, Tour of Albania
National Road Championships

3rd Time trial
5th Road race

2024
1st Road race, National Road Championships
1st Madison (with Nikolaos Drakos), National Track Championships
National Under-23 Road Championships

1st Road race
2nd Time trial

1st Tour of Thysia
1st Aegeas Road Race
1st Omphalios Classic
1st Stage 4 Tour de Kurpie
2nd Road race, Balkan Road Championships
6th Ronde van Overijssel
2025
National Road Championships

1st Road race
5th Time trial

National Under-23 Road Championships

1st Road race
3rd Time trial

1st Overall Tour of Bulgaria

1st Young rider classification
1st Stage 3

1st Grand Prix Edebiyat Yolu
1st Grand Prix Kahramanmaraş
1st Prologue Tour of Małopolska
2nd Overall Tour of Szeklerland

1st Young rider classification

3rd Overall Belgrade Banjaluka

1st Young rider classification

3rd Overall Tour de Serbie
9th Overall Turul Romaniei
2026
National Road Championships

1st Road race

1st International Rhodes Grand Prix
1st Tour of Thysia
1st Visegrad 4 Bicycle Race – GP Poland
1st Stage 2 Tour of Mersin
1st Stage 2 Tour of Rhodes
1st Stage 2 Belgrade-Banja Luka
2nd Velika Nagrada Novega Mesta
