= Kanellos Kanellopoulos =

Greek cyclist (born 1957)

Personal information
- Born: 25 April 1957 (age 69) Patras, Greece

Cycling career
- Sport: Cycling
- Discipline: Road
- Role: Rider

Kanellos Kanellopoulos (born 25 April 1957) is a Greek former cyclist. He competed in the individual road race event at the 1984 Summer Olympics. He was also the pilot and human engine for the 1988 MIT Daedalus project, completing the 72.4 mi (115.11 km) flight from Crete to the Greek island of Santorini in 3 hours, 54 minutes. It is the longest human-powered flight in history.

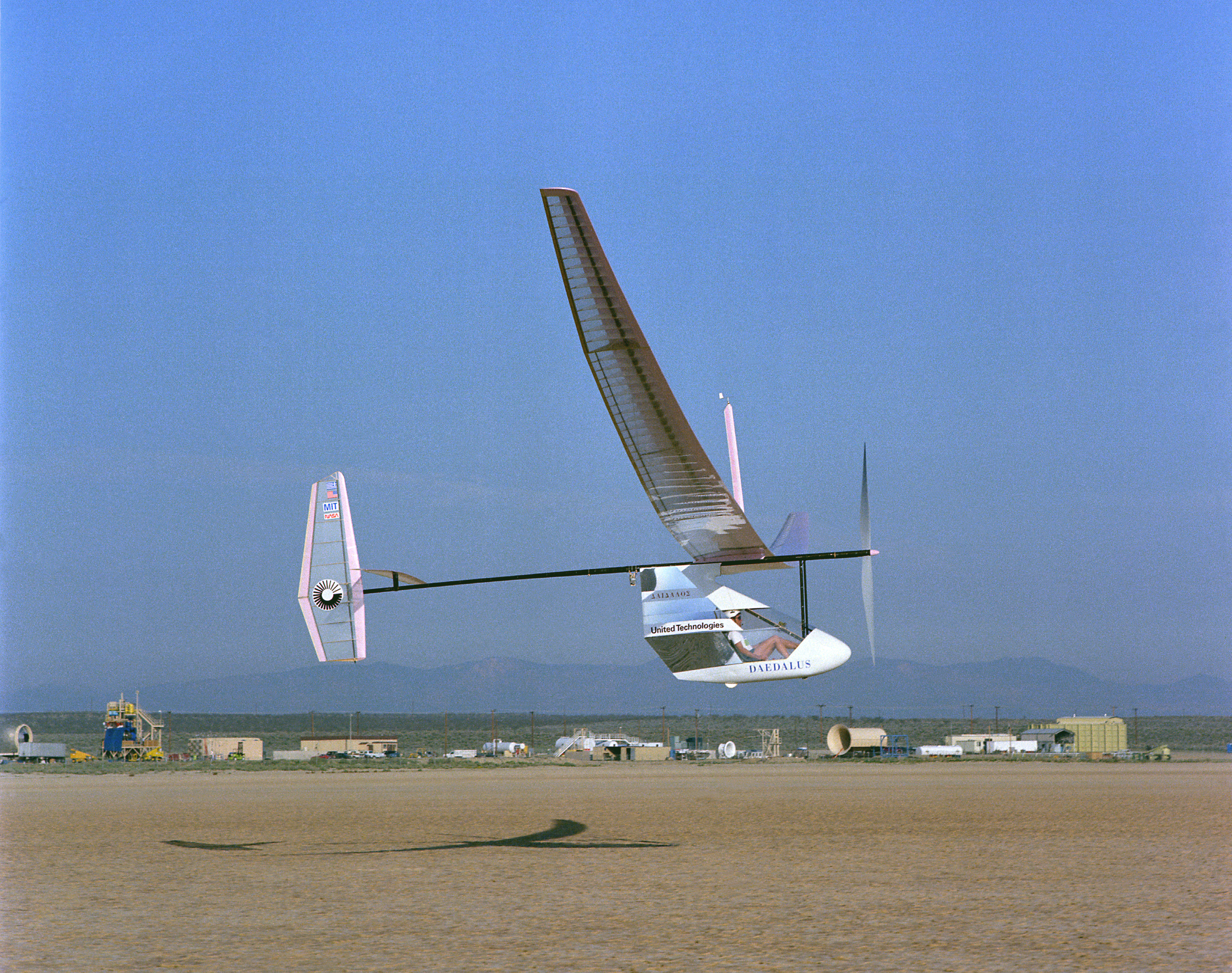
The MIT Daedalus in flight

== Major results ==
1976
2nd Road race, National Road Championships
1980
1st Road race, National Road Championships
1981
1st Overall Tour of Hellas
1982
1st Road race, National Road Championships
1984
1st Road race, National Road Championships
1985
1st Road race, National Road Championships
1986
2nd Overall Tour of Hellas
1987
1st Road race, National Road Championships
2nd Overall Tour of Hellas
