= SP Tableware =

Team information
- UCI code: SPT
- Registered: Greece
- Founded: 2009
- Discipline: Road
- Status: UCI Continental (2009–2014); National (2015– )
- Bicycles: Eddy Merckx
- Website: Team home page

Key personnel
- General manager: Vasileios Anastopoulos

Team name history
- 2009 2010–2011 2012 2013–: SP. Tableware–Gatsoulis Bikes; SP Tableware; SP Tableware Cycling Team; SP Tableware

SP Tableware was a UCI Continental cycling team based in Greece. It was founded in 2009 and dropped to National level for the 2015 season onwards.

== Major results ==
2009
Overall Romanian Cycling Tour, Alexey Shchebelin

Prologue, Ioannis Tamouridis
Stage 7, Alexey Shchebelin

2011
Stage 3 Jelajah Malaysia, Ioannis Tamouridis
Stage 2 International Tour of Hellas, Ioannis Tamouridis
Stage 3 Romanian Cycling Tour, Ioannis Tamouridis
Stage 1 Tour of Szeklerland, Ioannis Tamouridis

2012
Stage 2 Tour d'Algérie, Joaquin Sobrino
Circuit d'Alger, Ioannis Tamouridis
Stage 3 International Tour of Hellas, Periklis Ilias
Stages 1 (ITT) & 7 Romanian Cycling Tour, Ioannis Tamouridis
Stage 8 Romanian Cycling Tour, Víctor de la Parte
Greece National Time Trial Championship, Ioannis Tamouridis
Overall Sibiu Cycling Tour, Víctor de la Parte

Stage 1, Víctor de la Parte

Stage 4b Tour of Szeklerland, Ioannis Tamouridis
Stage 3 Okolo Jiznich Cech, Joaquin Sobrino

2013
Overall Tour d'Algérie, Víctor de la Parte

Stage 5, Víctor de la Parte

Stage 3 Tour de Tipaza, Georgios Karatzios
Stage 4 Five Rings of Moscow, Joaquin Sobrino
Stages 2 & 5 Romanian Cycling Tour, Georgios Bouglas

2014
Stage 4 Tour de Taiwan, Ioannis Tamouridis
Greece National Time Trial Championship, Georgios Bouglas

== Final roster ==
Rider	Date of birth
Antoniadis Dimitrios (GRE)	July 29, 1992 (age 34)
Apostolos Boúglas (GRE)	March 16, 1989 (age 37)
Georgios Bouglas (GRE)	November 17, 1990 (age 35)
Periklis Ilias (GRE)	June 26, 1986 (age 40)
Panagiotis Karabinakis (GRE)	April 26, 1993 (age 33)

Rider	Date of birth
Georgios Karatzios (GRE)	November 7, 1990 (age 35)
Neofytos Sakellaridis-Mangouras (GRE)	January 31, 1989 (age 37)
Vasileios Simantirakis (GRE)	March 1, 1989 (age 37)
Ioannis Tamouridis (GRE)	June 3, 1980 (age 46)
