= Cycling at the 2018 Mediterranean Games – Women's road time trial =

Women's road time trial at the 2018 Mediterranean Games
- Venue: Vila-seca Urban Circuit; 18 km (11.2 mi)
- Date: 30 June
- Competitors: 9 from 6 nations
- Winning time: 24:15

Medalists
gold medal	Elena Cecchini	Italy
silver medal	Lisa Morzenti	Italy
bronze medal	Antri Christoforou	Cyprus

The women's individual time trial was one of 4 cycling events of the 2018 Mediterranean Games. The event started and finished on 30 June at the Vila-seca Urban Circuit.

== Results ==
Pos.	No.	Rider	Country	Time	Diff
1st place, gold medalist(s)	1	Elena Cecchini	Italy	24:15.67	
2nd place, silver medalist(s)	5	Lisa Morzenti	Italy	25:02.36	+0:47
3rd place, bronze medalist(s)	4	Antri Christoforou	Cyprus	25:12.10	+0:57
4	7	Daniela Reis	Portugal	25:38.45	+1:23
5	9	Varvara Fasoi	Greece	25:51.61	+1:36
6	6	Sara Martín	Spain	26:18.34	+2:03
7	3	Argyro Milaki	Greece	26:36.71	+2:21
8	2	Kübra Bektaş	Turkey	30:00.56	+5:45
9	8	Beyza Kahveci	Turkey	30:57.16	+6:42
