= Yuliya Martisova =

Russian cyclist (born 1976)

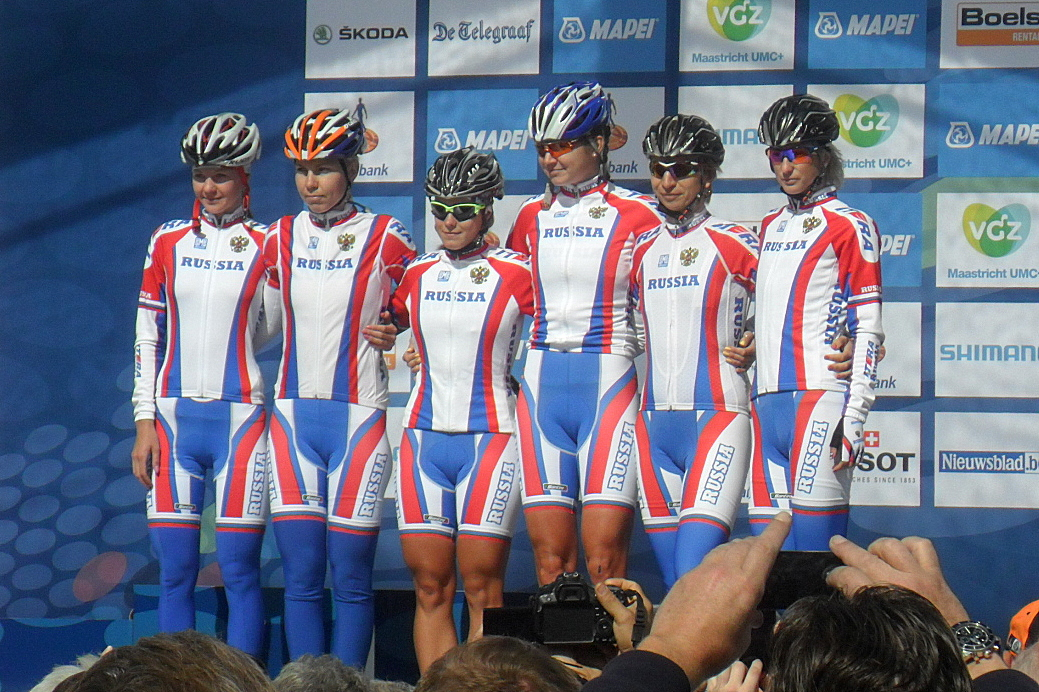
- Yuliya Martisova at the 2012 UCI Road World Championships

Personal information
- Full name: Yuliya Viktorovna Martisova
- Born: 15 June 1976 (age 50) Velikiye Luki, Pskov Oblast, Russian SFSR
- Height: 1.69 m (5 ft 6 1/2 in)
- Weight: 64 kg (141 lb)

Cycling career
- Sport: Cycling
- Current team: Forno d'Asolo Colavita
- Discipline: Road
- Role: Rider, time-trialist

Professional teams
- 2000: Itera
- 2003: Team Prato Marathon Bike
- 2005–2006: P.M.B. Fenix
- 2008–2011: Gauss RDZ-Ormu
- 2012: Be Pink
- 2013: Forno d'Asolo Colavita

Major wins
- Russian Championships (2005, 2008)

Yuliya Viktorovna Martisova (also Julia Martisova, Russian: Юлия Викторовна Мартисова; born 15 June 1976 in Velikiye Luki, Pskov Oblast) is a Russian professional road cyclist. She has awarded two Russian championship titles (2005 and 2008) in the women's road race, and later represented her nation Russia at the 2008 Summer Olympics. Martisova currently races for Italy's Forno d'Asolo Colavita pro cycling team during the 2013 annual season.

== Racing career ==
Since her professional debut in 2000, Martisova made the worldwide headlines in her sporting career, following her tremendous success in the women's road race at the 2005 Russian Championships. Strong results landed her spot on the P.M.B. Fenix Cycling Team in Italy under an exclusive three-year contract, and eventually added another title in her career hardware from the seventh stage of Tour De L'Aude Cycliste Féminin in Languedoc-Roussillon, France. When her contract with Fenix expired shortly, Martisova transferred to Gauss RDZ-Ormu pro cycling team in 2008, and stayed for four consecutive seasons. Furthermore, she recaptured her title in the same category at the Russian Championships on the same year.

Martisova qualified for the Russian squad in the women's road race at the 2008 Summer Olympics in Beijing by receiving one of the nation's three available berths from the UCI World Cup. She scored a career-high, twelfth place as the top Russian cyclist on a grueling race against sixty-five other riders in 3:32:45, finishing more than twenty-one seconds behind Olympic champion Nicole Cooke of Great Britain.

At the 2011 UCI Road World Championships, Martisova could not chase four other riders from the leading group on the final lap, as she sprinted towards the finish line with a fifth-place effort in 3:21:28, narrowly missing out the podium by a short distance.

In 2012, Martisova renounced her membership in Gauss, and instead signed a one-year exclusive contract with Italy's BePink ladies' cycling team.

== Career highlights ==
2000
2nd Stage 3, Grande Boucle Féminine Internationale, France
3rd Russian Championships (Road), Russia
2001
2nd Overall, Trophée d'Or Féminin, France

1st Stage 1

2002
2nd Stage 5, Giro d'Italia Femminile, Italy
3rd Stage 3, Giro d'Italia Femminile, Italy
2005
1st Russian Championships (Road), Russia
1st Stage 7, Tour De L'Aude Cycliste Féminin, Languedoc-Roussillon (FRA)
2nd Stage 2, Tour de l'Ardèche, Beauchastel (FRA)
2nd Stage 3, Tour De L'Aude Cycliste Féminin, Languedoc-Roussillon (FRA)
3rd Stage 1b, Tour de l'Ardèche, Cruas (FRA)
3rd Stage 3b Giro della Toscana Int. Femminile – Memorial Michela Fanini, Campi Bisenzio (ITA)
3rd Stage 4, Tour de l'Ardèche, Bourg-Saint-Andéol (FRA)
2008
1st Russian Championships (Road), Russia
3rd Overall, Tour Féminin en Limousin, France

1st Stage 3, Lauriere

10th UCI World Championships (Road), Varese (ITA)
59th Olympic Games (Road), Beijing (CHN)
2009
3rd Stage 6, Giro della Toscana Int. Femminile, Florence (ITA)
4th Stage 2, Giro della Toscana Int. Femminile, Altopascio (ITA)
6th Prologue, Route de France Féminine, Chaix (FRA)

3rd Stage 5, Châtelguyon
4th Stage 1, Cholet
4th Stage 2, Cholet
6th Stage 3, Vierzon

7th Stage 9, Giro d'Italia Femminile, Grumo Nevano (ITA)
2010
2nd Russian Championships (Road), Cheboksary (RUS)
2nd Stage 6, Tour De L'Aude Cycliste Féminin, Languedoc-Roussillon (FRA)
3rd Stage 1, Trophée d'Or Féminin, Mehun-sur-Yèvre (FRA)
3rd Stage 3, Trophée d'Or Féminin, Avord (FRA)
5th Stage 3, Thüringen Rundfahrt der Frauen, Greiz (GER)
5th Stage 8, Tour De L'Aude Cycliste Féminin, Limoux (FRA)
5th Stage 9, Tour De L'Aude Cycliste Féminin, Languedoc-Roussillon (FRA)
8th Stage 2, Giro d'Italia Femminile, Riese Pio X (ITA)
8th Stage 5, Thüringen Rundfahrt der Frauen, Schmölln (GER)
9th Stage 2, Thüringen Rundfahrt der Frauen, Gera (GER)
10th Stage 2, Giro della Toscana Int. Femminile, Altopascio (ITA)
2011
3rd Stage 1, Tour de l'Ardèche, Beauchastel (FRA)
3rd Stage 3, Tour de l'Ardèche, Le Teil (FRA)
5th UCI World Championships (Road), Copenhagen (DEN)
5th Stage 2, Giro della Toscana Int. Femminile, Altopascio (ITA)
5th Stage 5, Giro d'Italia Femminile, Verona (ITA)
7th Stage 6, Giro d'Italia Femminile, Piacenza (ITA)
2012
5th Stage 4, Trophée d'Or Féminin, Cosne-sur-Loire (FRA)
8th Overall, Tour of Adygeya, Russia

1st Stage 1, Maykop
4th Stage 3, Maykop

10th Stage 1, Giro della Toscana Int. Femminile, Viareggio (ITA)
2013
10th Overall, Tour of Chongming Island World Cup, China
