= International Tour of Rhodes =

Greek multi-day road cycling race

Race details
- Region: Rhodes, Greece
- Local name: Διεθνής Γύρος Ρόδου (Greek)
- Discipline: Road
- Type: Stage race
- Organiser: Cycling Club ‘’Rodilios’’ & Sports Tours Hellas
- Race director: Giorgos Leventakis
- Web site: rhodestour.gr

History
- First edition: 1987
- Editions: 20 (as of 2026)
- First winner: Kanellos Kanellopoulos (GRE)
- Most wins: Fabian Cancellara (SUI) (2 wins)
- Most recent: Matteo Scalco (ITA)

The International Tour of Rhodes is an annual professional cycling stage race held in Rhodes, Greece. It was first held in 1987, but the second edition only took place in 1995. Between 2001 and 2003 it became a professional race. Fabian Cancellara won the race twice, in 2001 and 2002, including his first victory as a professional in 2001. The race was not held from 2004 until 2017 when it returned to the calendar as a 2.2 event and part of the UCI Europe Tour.

== Winners ==
Year	Country	Rider	Team
1987	Greece	Kanellos Kanellopoulos	–
1988– 1994	No race		
1995	Greece	Kyriakos Koutsoudakis Vasilis Anastopoulos	–
1996	Belarus	Evgeni Golovanov	–
1997	Czech Republic	Jozef Regec	–
1998	Germany	Holger Sievers	EC/Bayer Worringen
1999	Austria	Arno Kaspret	–
2000	Denmark	Dennis Rasmussen	Team Fakta
2001	Switzerland	Fabian Cancellara	Mapei–Quick-Step
2002	Switzerland	Fabian Cancellara	Mapei–Quick-Step
2003	Netherlands	Bram Schmitz	BankGiroLoterij
2004– 2016	No race		
2017	Switzerland	Colin Stüssi	Roth–Akros
2018	Italy	Mirco Maestri	Bardiani–CSF
2019	Netherlands	Martijn Budding	BEAT Cycling Club
2020	Norway	Søren Wærenskjold	Joker Fuel of Norway
2021	Norway	Fredrik Dversnes	Team Coop
2022	Denmark	Louis Bendixen	Team Coop
2023	Portugal	António Morgado	Hagens Berman Jayco
2024	Norway	André Drege	Team Drali–Repsol
2025	France	Pierre-Henry Basset	XDS Astana Development Team
2026	Italy	Matteo Scalco	XDS Astana Development Team

== See also ==
- Tour of Greece
- Rhodes Grand Prix
- Visit South Aegean Islands
