= Stylianos Farantakis =

Greek cyclist (born 1995)

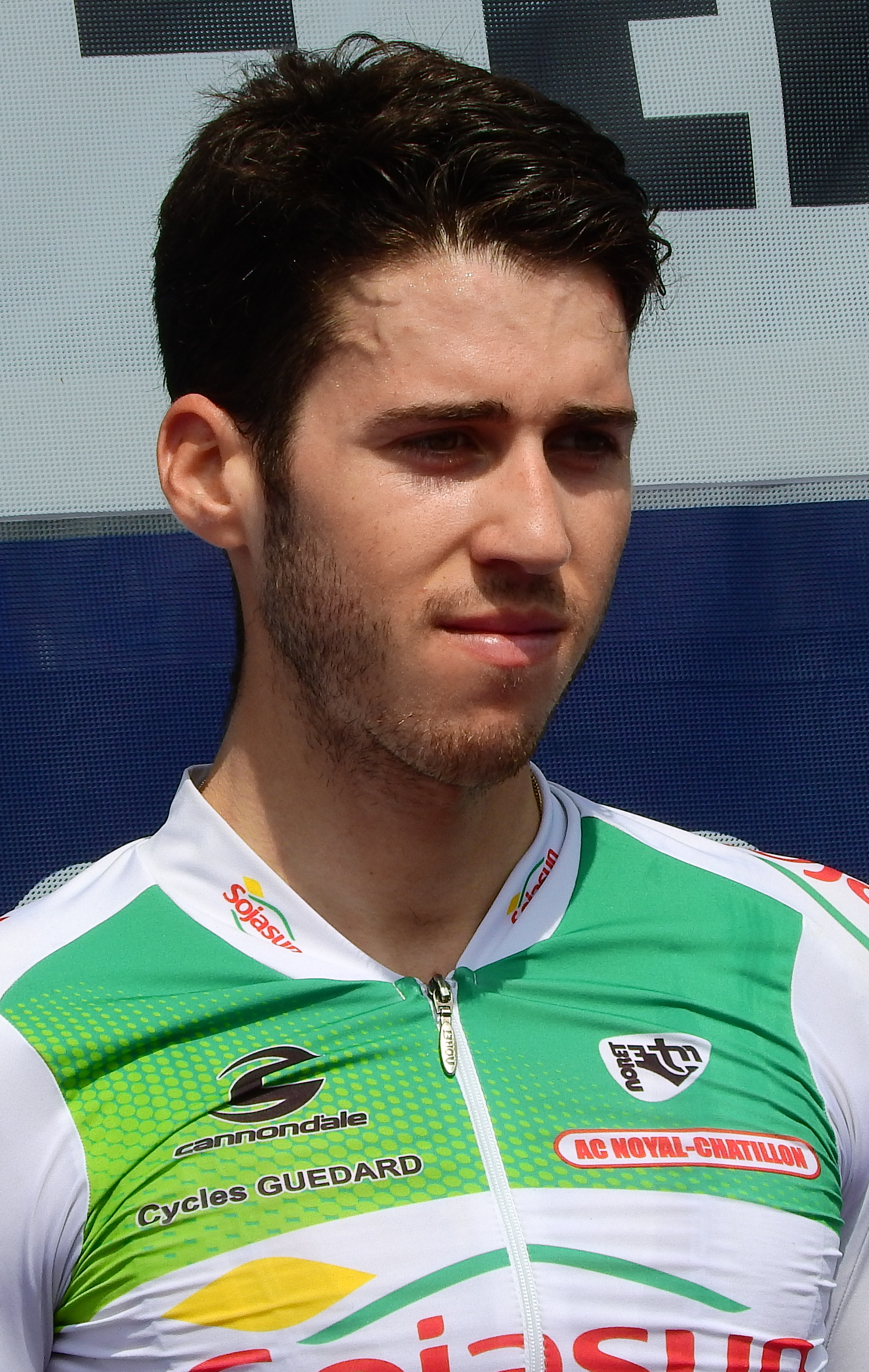
- Farantakis in 2017

Personal information
- Born: 25 May 1995 (age 31) Chania, Greece
- Height: 1.73 m (5 ft 8 in)
- Weight: 62 kg (137 lb)

Cycling career
- Sport: Cycling
- Current team: Retired
- Discipline: Road
- Role: Rider

Amateur teams
- 2012: VCC Morteau–Montbenoît Junior
- 2013: TWC Pijnenburg
- 2014–2015: UC Aubenas
- 2016–2019: Sojasun Espoir–ACNC
- 2020: VC Pays de Loudéac

Stylianos Farantakis (Greek: Στυλιανός Φαραντάκης; born 25 May 1995) is a Greek former cyclist, who rode competitively between 2012 and 2020 for amateur teams in the Netherlands and France.

== Major results ==
2012
National Junior Road Championships

1st Time trial
3rd Road race

2013
National Junior Road Championships

1st Time trial
2nd Road race

2014
1st Road race, National Under-23 Road Championships
2015
National Road Championships

1st Under-23 road race
2nd Under-23 time trial
3rd Road race

5th Road race, UEC European Under-23 Road Championships
2016
National Under-23 Road Championships

1st Road race
1st Time trial

National Road Championships

2nd Time trial
3rd Road race

2017
National Road Championships

2nd Road race
3rd Time trial

8th Paris–Tours Espoirs
2018
National Road Championships

1st Time trial
2nd Road race

2019
1st Road race, National Road Championships
4th Overall Tour d'Egypte

1st Stage 3

2020
2nd Road race, National Road Championships
