= Vasilis Anastopoulos =

Greek cyclist (born 1975)

Personal information
- Born: 20 December 1975 (age 50) Megalopolis, Greece

Cycling career
- Sport: Cycling
- Current team: Retired
- Discipline: Road
- Role: Rider

Professional teams
- 2002–2006: Volksbank–Ideal
- 2009: SP Tableware–Gatsoulis Bikes

Vasilis Anastopoulos (born 20 December 1975) is a Greek former cyclist and a cyclist trainer. Since 2019 he works for Quick-Step Cycling Team, training Mark Cavendish among others.

== Major results ==
1995
1st Stage 2 Tour of Rhodes
3rd National Road Race Championships
1997
1st Stage 7 Tour of Turkey
1998
1st Stage 9 Tour of Greece
1st Stage 1 Tour of Yugoslavia
2000
1st National Road Race Championships
2001
1st National Road Race Championships
1st National Time Trial Championships
2002
1st Balkan Road Race Championships
1st Stage 3 Tour of Rhodes
1st Stages 3 & 6 Tour of Greece
2nd National Time Trial Championships
2003
1st Overall Tour of Greece

1st Stage 2

2nd National Time Trial Championships
2004
1st National Road Race Championships
2nd National Time Trial Championships
2005
1st National Road Race Championships
3rd National Time Trial Championships
2006
3rd National Road Race Championships
2007
3rd National Time Trial Championships
2009
2nd National Time Trial Championships
3rd National Road Race Championships
