= Kuwait Pro Cycling Team =

Team information
- UCI code: KPT
- Registered: Kuwait
- Founded: 2021
- Disbanded: 2022
- Discipline: Road
- Status: UCI Continental

Key personnel
- Team managers: Maxime Martin; Muhamad Firdaus Daud; Yong Li Ng

Team name history
- 2021 to 2022: Kuwait Pro Cycling Team

The Kuwait Pro Cycling Team is a Kuwaiti UCI Continental cycling team founded in 2021.

== Team roster ==
As of 1 February 2022.

Rider	Date of birth
Abdulhadi Alajmi (KUW)	2 May 1995 (age 31)
Saied Jafer Alali (KUW)	29 October 1988 (age 37)
Abdulrahman Almansour (KUW)	25 October 1992 (age 33)
Salman Alsaffar (KUW)	26 January 1989 (age 37)
Mansoor Alsubaiei (KUW)	7 March 1997 (age 29)
Marcus Burnett (GBR)	2 September 1998 (age 28)

Rider	Date of birth
Matthew Clements (GBR)	15 October 1997 (age 28)
James Jobber (GBR)	9 January 1994 (age 32)
Jayde Julius (RSA)	27 August 1993 (age 33)
Charalampos Kastrantas (GRE)	13 March 1991 (age 35)
Mehdi Tigrine (BEL)	29 October 1986 (age 39)
Polychronis Tzortzakis (GRE)	3 January 1989 (age 37)
