= Chalime Giourbouz =

Greek cyclist (born 1979)

Personal information
- Born: 19 March 1979 (age 47) Greece

Cycling career
- Sport: Cycling
- Discipline: Road cycling

Chalime Giourbouz (born 19 March 1979) is a road cyclist from Greece. She represented her nation at the 2002 UCI Road World Championships.
