= Sfendami =

Sfendami Σφενδάμι
- Community
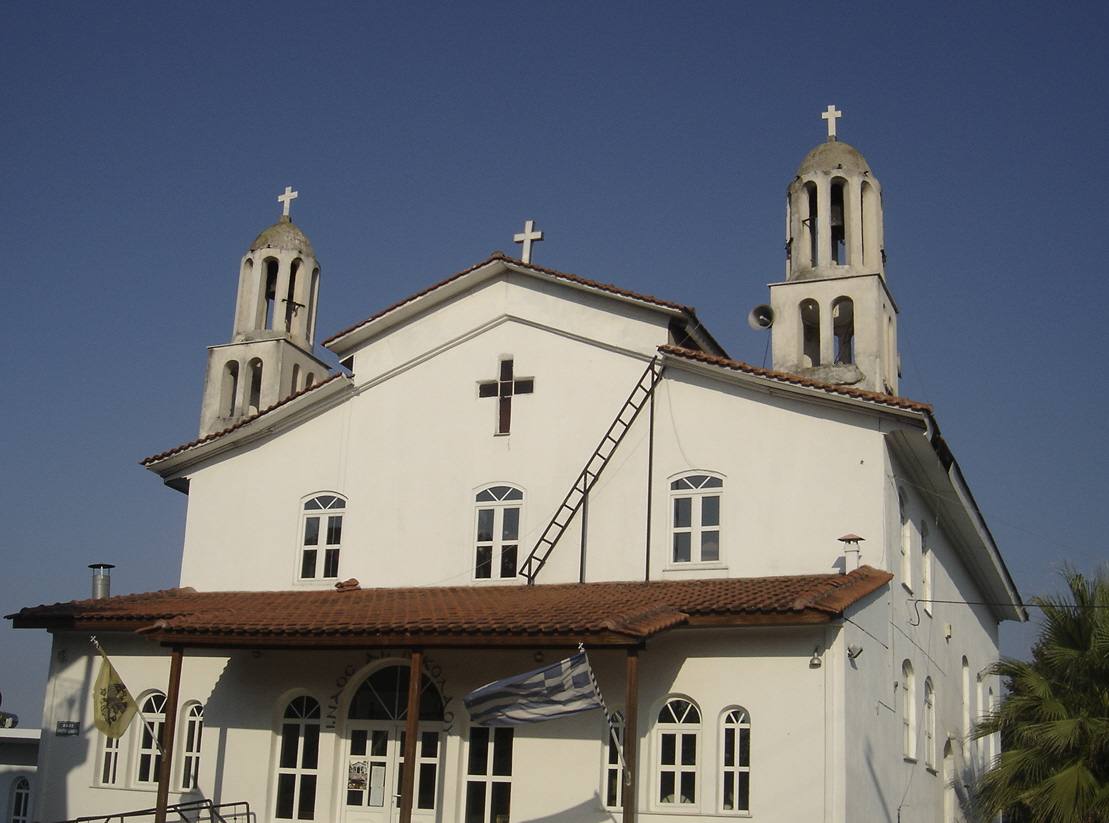
- A church in Sfendami

- Location within Greece
- Coordinates: 40°25′N 22°32.5′E
- Country: Greece
- Administrative region: Central Macedonia
- Regional unit: Pieria
- Municipality: Pydna-Kolindros
- Municipal unit: Pydna
- Elevation: 160 m (520 ft)

Population (2021)
  - Community: 694
- Time zone: UTC+2 (EET)
  - Summer (DST): UTC+3 (EEST)
- Postal code: 600 66
- Area code: +30-2351
- Vehicle registration: KN

Sfendami (Greek: Σφενδάμη) is a village in Pieria, Greece. Since the 2011 local government reform it is part of the municipality Pydna-Kolindros, of which it is a municipal community. The 2021 census recorded 694 residents in the village.

== See also ==
- List of settlements in the Pieria regional unit
