= Bassirou Konté =

Ivorian bicycle racer

Personal information
- Born: 18 July 1988 (age 38) Grand Bassam, Ivory Coast

Cycling career
- Sport: Cycling
- Discipline: Road
- Role: Rider

Professional teams
- 2010: Team Worldofbike.gr (stagiaire)
- 2011: Team Worldofbike.gr

Bassirou Konté (born 18 July 1988) is an Ivorian cyclist.

== Major results ==
2008
1st Road race, National Road Championships
1st Stage 6 Tour du Cameroun
2010
1st Stage 2 Tour du Cameroun
7th Overall Tour du Faso
2011
10th Road race, All-Africa Games
2013
1st Road race, National Road Championships
1st Stage 7 Tour du Faso
2014
1st Road race, National Road Championships
2015
1st Stage 7 Tour du Cameroun
2016
1st Road race, National Road Championships
2017
1st Road race, National Road Championships
5th Overall Tour de Côte d'Ivoire

1st Stage 3 (ITT)
