= Philippe Schnyder =

Swiss cyclist

Personal information
- Full name: Philippe Schnyder
- Born: 17 March 1978 (age 48) Rapperswil, Switzerland

Cycling career
- Sport: Cycling
- Current team: Retired
- Discipline: Road
- Role: Rider

Professional teams
- 2000–2001: KIA–Suisse
- 2002–2003: Volksbank–Ideal
- 2004–2007: Colombia–Selle Italia
- 2008: Hadimec–Nazionale Elettronica

Philippe Schnyder (born 17 March 1978 in Rapperswil) is a Swiss former professional cyclist.

== Major results ==
2002
1st Grand Prix Osterhas
2003
1st Duo Normand (with Jean Nuttli)
2004
2nd Tour du Sénégal
2005
1st National Hill Climb Championships
