= Ioannis Tamouridis =

Greek cyclist (born 1980)

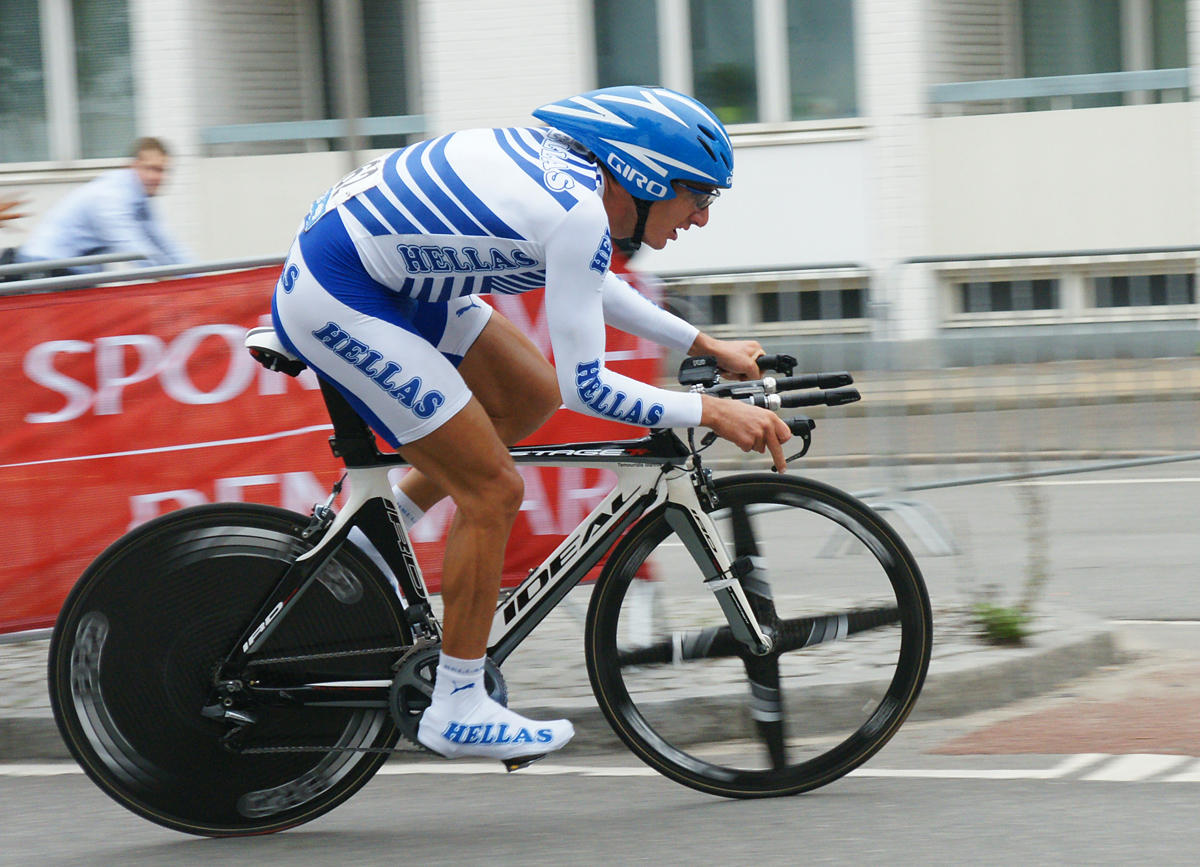
- Tamouridis during the time trial at the 2011 UCI Road World Championships

Personal information
- Full name: Ioannis Tamouridis
- Born: 3 June 1980 (age 46) Thessaloniki, Greece
- Height: 1.8 m (5 ft 11 in)
- Weight: 70 kg (154 lb)

Cycling career
- Sport: Cycling
- Current team: Intermarché–Wanty
- Disciplines: Road; Track
- Role: Rider (retired); Directeur sportif

Amateur teams
- 1999–2001: Aftodromos Salonika
- 2003–2005: Bergamasca
- 2006: Aftodromos Salonika
- 2007–2008: PAOK

Professional teams
- 2009–2012: SP Tableware–Gatsoulis Bikes
- 2013: Euskaltel–Euskadi
- 2014: SP Tableware
- 2015–2016: Synergy Baku

Managerial teams
- 2019–2021: SEG Racing Academy
- 2022–: Intermarché–Wanty–Gobert Matériaux

Major wins
- National Time Trial Championships (9 times) (Note: Tamouridis has won the Greek National Time Trial Championships in 2003, 2005, 2009, 2010, 2011, 2012, 2013, 2015 and 2016.); National Road Race Championships (5 times) (Note: Tamouridis has won the Greek National Road Race Championships in 2006, 2010, 2011, 2013 and 2016.)
Medal record
Representing Greece
Men's track cycling
World Championships
Silver medal – second place	2005 Los Angeles	Points race
Bronze medal – third place	2006 Bordeaux	Scratch race

Ioannis Tamouridis (Greek: Ιωάννης Ταμουρίδης; born 3 June 1980) is a Greek former professional cyclist from Thessaloniki, Greece. He started cycling in 1995 and he competed in the road and track disciplines. Tamouridis now works as a directeur sportif for UCI WorldTeam Intermarché–Wanty.

== Career ==
=== Early career ===
Highlights of his earlier career include two medals in world track championships, in Points Races (Los Angeles 2005) and Scratch (Bordeaux 2006). He has won 4 medals in track world cup by 2006 and has more than 30 times become Greek national champion in all disciplines (road, track and mountain bike races) and all categories.

In 2008, Tamouridis was given a one-year ban from cycling, following a positive drugs test for oxandrolone, an androgen and anabolic steroid (AAS).

He won the bronze medal for the time trial at the XVI Mediterranean Games held in Pescara, Italy, and competed with SP Tableware between 2009 and 2012.

=== Euskaltel–Euskadi (2013) ===
He then joined the Euskaltel–Euskadi team for the 2013 season, where he has affectionately become known as 'Tamu' among his teammates.

To date, he is the only Greek cyclist to have raced at the Spring Classics of Milan–San Remo, where he finished 88th out of 200 starters and 135 finishers under treacherous weather conditions, Paris–Roubaix, Tirreno–Adriatico and the Tour of Flanders. He is also the first Greek cyclist to have entered and finished a grand tour, the Giro d'Italia in 2013 where he participated in four bunch sprint finishes, achieving ninth place on the twelfth stage of the race. He also came seventh in the Premio della Fuga classification.

In June 2013 Tamouridis won both the Greek National Road Race Championships and Greek National Time Trial Championships titles, dedicating the latter to Rufino Murguía, Euskaltel–Euskadi's team masseur, who was killed when the team's bus was involved in a crash.

Tamouridis rejoined SP Tableware in 2014, after his previous team – Euskaltel–Euskadi – folded at the end of the 2013 season.

== Major results ==
=== Road ===
1997
National Junior Road Championships

1st Time trial
1st Road race

1998
1st Time trial, Balkan Junior Road Championships
National Junior Road Championships

1st Time trial
1st Road race

1st Overall Junior Tour of Greece
1st Firenze–Naples
1999
1st Time trial, National Under-23 Road Championships
2000
National Under-23 Road Championships

1st Time trial
2nd Road race

2001
1st Time trial, National Under-23 Road Championships
6th Time trial, Mediterranean Games
2002
1st Time trial, Balkan Under-23 Road Championships
1st Time trial, National Under-23 Road Championships
1st Prologue Tour of Greece
2003
1st Time trial, National Road Championships
3rd Overall Tour of Greece
3rd Sacrifice Cup
2004
4th Overall Tour of Greece
2005
National Road Championships

1st Time trial
3rd Road race

9th Time trial, Mediterranean Games
2006
1st Road race, National Road Championships
2009
1st Time trial, National Road Championships
3rd Time trial, Mediterranean Games
3rd Overall Tour du Maroc
9th Overall Tour of Romania

1st Prologue

2010
National Road Championships

1st Road race
1st Time trial

3rd Overall Tour of Romania
5th Overall Okolo Slovenska
2011
National Road Championships

1st Road race
1st Time trial

2nd Overall Tour of Greece

1st Stage 2a (ITT)

2nd Overall Tour of Szeklerland

1st Stage 1

2nd Overall Tour of Romania

1st Stage 3

2nd Jūrmala Grand Prix
3rd Overall Jelajah Malaysia

1st Stage 3

3rd Grand Prix de la ville de Nogent-sur-Oise
5th Tour of Vojvodina II
7th Tour of Vojvodina I
2012
1st Time trial, National Road Championships
1st Circuit d'Alger
Tour of Romania

1st Points classification
1st Stages 1 (ITT), 7 & 9

3rd Overall Tour of Greece

1st Mountains classification

4th Overall Sibiu Cycling Tour
5th Overall Troféu Joaquim Agostinho
6th Overall Tour d'Algérie
8th Overall Five Rings of Moscow
8th Banja Luka–Belgrade I
9th Overall Tour of Szeklerland

1st Stage 4b

2013
National Road Championships

1st Road race
1st Time trial

9th Paris–Tours
2014
National Road Championships

2nd Time trial
3rd Road race

2nd Overall Tour de Taiwan

1st Stage 4

7th Overall Five Rings of Moscow
9th Overall Tour de Serbie
9th Race Horizon Park 2
2015
National Road Championships

1st Time trial
2nd Road race

2nd Overall Tour of Estonia
5th Belgrade–Banja Luka II
5th Duo Normand (with Maksym Averin)
9th Odessa Grand Prix 2
2016
National Road Championships

1st Road race
1st Time trial

==== Grand Tour general classification results timeline ====
Grand Tour	2013
Giro d'Italia	152
Tour de France	—
Vuelta a España	—

Legend
—	Did not compete
DNF	Did not finish

=== Track ===
1997
1st Points race, National Junior Track Championships
1998
1st Points race, Balkan Junior Track Championships
1st Points race, National Junior Track Championships
1999
1st Points race, National Under-23 Track Championships
7th World Cup track team Pursuit
2002
2nd European Points Race Championships
2003
UCI Track World Cup Classics

6th Madison, Cape Town
6th Individual pursuit, Sydney
6th Points race, Sydney

2004
1st Manchester Revolution track event – 1500m
7th Team pursuit, UCI Track World Cup Classics, Aguascalientes
2005
1st Points race, National Track Championships
2nd Points race, UCI Track Cycling World Championships
2004–05 UCI Track Cycling World Cup Classics

2nd Points race, Sydney
3rd Scratch, Manchester

3rd Scratch, 2005–06 UCI Track Cycling World Cup Classics, Manchester
2006
2nd Points race, 2005–06 UCI Track Cycling World Cup Classics, Carson
UCI Track Cycling World Championships

3rd Scratch
6th Points race

2007
2nd Points race, 2006–07 UCI Track Cycling World Cup Classics, Manchester
2009
Points race, 2009–10 UCI Track Cycling World Cup Classics

1st Cali
2nd Melbourne

=== Mountain biking ===
1997
1st Cross-country, National Junior Mountain Bike Championships
