= Neofytos Sakellaridis-Mangouras =

Greek cyclist (born 1989)

Personal information
- Nickname: Neo
- Born: January 31, 1989 (age 37) Denver, United States

Cycling career
- Sport: Cycling
- Disciplines: Road; Track
- Role: Rider

Amateur teams
- 2015–2016: IBT Isolering–Ridley
- 2021: P.S. Kronos

Professional teams
- 2009: Heraklion–Nessebar
- 2010–2014: SP Tableware

Neofytos (Neo) Sakellaridis Mangouras (Greek: Νεόφυτος Σακελλαρίδης-Μάγκουρας; born January 31, 1989) is a Greek cyclist and legal scholar.

== Education and Career ==
Outside of cycling, Sakellaridis Mangouras is a legal theorist focusing on constitutional theory, the production of legislation and normativity. He holds a PhD in law from the University of Glasgow School of Law (title of PhD thesis: Legislating with dignity. Form as legislation's inner morality) and a Master of Laws from the University of Copenhagen.

== Major results ==
2008
1st Time trial, National Under-23 Road Championships
2009
1st Time trial, National Under-23 Road Championships
2010
National Road Championships

3rd Under-23 time trial
3rd Road race

2011
National Road Championships

2nd Under-23 time trial
2nd Road race

2012
3rd Time trial, National Road Championships
2013
2nd Time trial, National Road Championships
2014
3rd Time trial, National Road Championships
2015
2nd Time trial, National Road Championships
