= Elissavet Chantzi =

Greek cyclist (born 1977)

Personal information
- Born: 12 April 1977 (age 49) Greece

Cycling career
- Sport: Cycling
- Disciplines: Road cycling, Track cycling

Professional team
- 2004: Bik-Gios

Elissavet Chantzi (or Elisabet Chantzi; born 12 April 1977) is a track and road cyclist from Greece. Between 2006 and 2012 she became national champion in the women's time trial. She represented her nation at the 2007 UCI Road World Championships in the women's time trial and on the track at the 2010 UCI Track Cycling World Championships.
