= International Rhodes Grand Prix =

One-day road race

Race details
- Date: March
- Region: Greece
- Discipline: Road
- Competition: UCI Europe Tour
- Type: One-day race
- Web site: rhodestour.gr

History
- First edition: 2017; 9 years ago
- Editions: 10 (as of 2026)
- First winner: Alan Banaszek (POL)
- Most wins: No repeat winners
- Most recent: Nikiforos Arvanitou (GRE)

International Rhodes Grand Prix is a one-day road cycling race held annually, since 2017 on the Greek island of Rhodes. It is part of UCI Europe Tour in category 1.2.

== Winners ==
Year	Country	Rider	Team
2017	Poland	Alan Banaszek	CCC–Sprandi–Polkowice
2018	Italy	Matteo Moschetti	Polartec–Kometa
2019	Serbia	Dušan Rajović	Adria Mobil
2020	Norway	Erlend Blikra	Uno-X Norwegian Development Team
2021	Norway	Tord Gudmestad	Team Coop
2022	Norway	André Drege	Team Coop
2023	Norway	Eirik Lunder	Team Coop–Repsol
2024	United States	Tyler Stites	Project Echelon Racing
2025	Poland	Marcin Budziński	ATT Investments
2026	Greece	Nikiforos Arvanitou	Team United Shipping

== See also ==
- Tour of Rhodes, Greece
- Tour of Greece, Greece
- Visit South Aegean Islands, Greece
