= Anastasia Pastourmatzi =

Greek cyclist (born 1977)

Personal information
- Born: 4 November 1977 (age 48) Greece

Cycling career
- Sport: Cycling
- Discipline: Road cycling

Anastasia Pastourmatzi (born 4 May 1977) is a road cyclist from Greece. She represented her nation at the 2007 UCI Road World Championships.
