= Greek National Time Trial Championships =

National road cycling championship in Greece

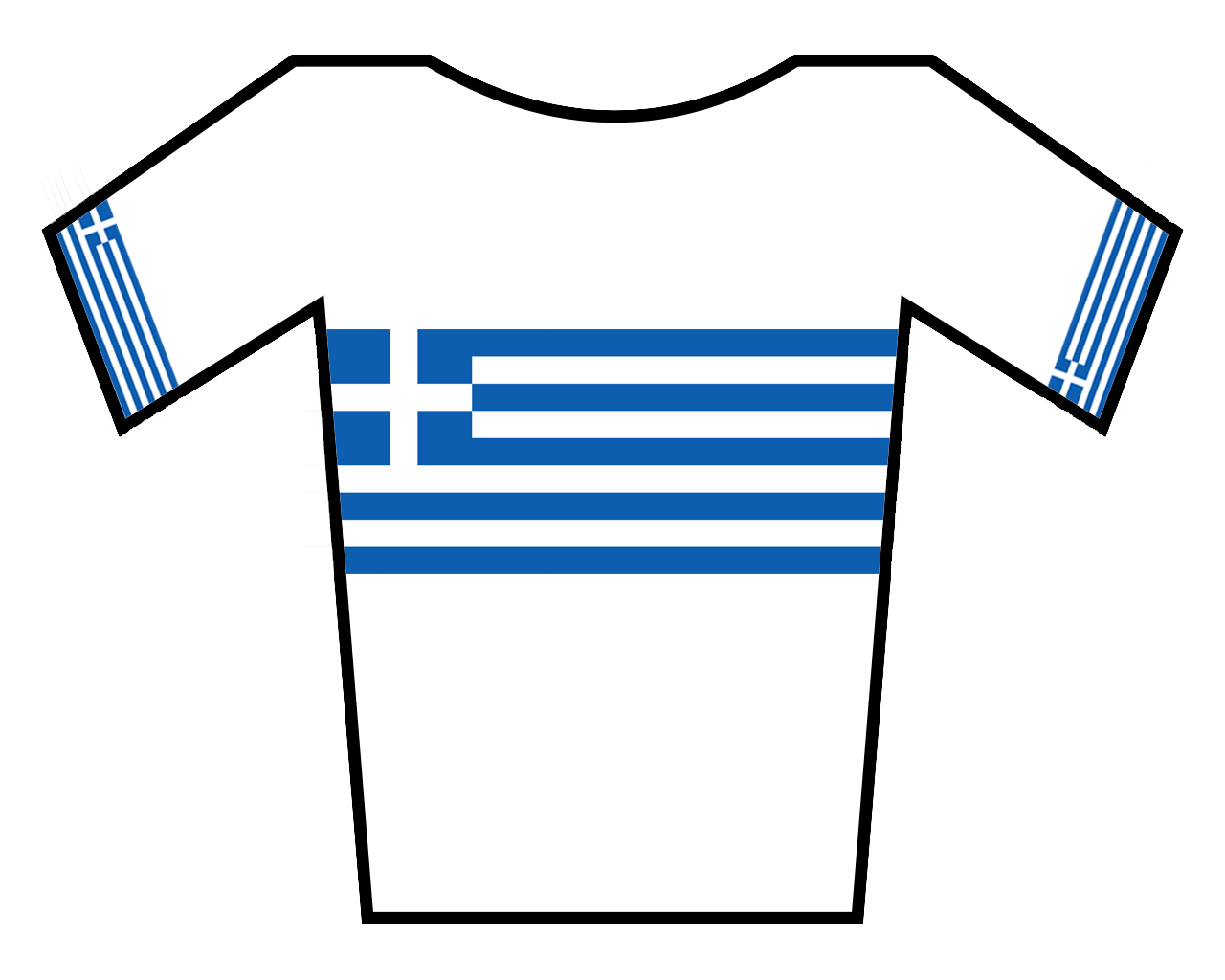

The Greek National Time Trial Championships have been held since 2000.

== Men ==
Year	Gold	Silver	Bronze
2000	Ioannis Tamouridis	Panagiotis Lekkas	Apostolos Sotis
2001	Vasilis Anastopoulos	Iosif Dalezios	Panagiotis Lekkas
2002	Iosif Dalezios	Vasilis Anastopoulos	Elpidofiros Potouridis
2003	Ioannis Tamouridis	Vasilis Anastopoulos	Elpidoforos Potouridis
2004	Elpidoforos Potouridis	Vasilis Anastopoulos	Minas Malatos
2005	Ioannis Tamouridis	Elpidoforos Potouridis	Vasilis Anastopoulos
2006	Elpidoforos Potouridis	Iosif Dalezios	Geirgios Tentsos
2007	Georgios Tentsos	Sotirios Exarchopoulos	Vasilis Anastopoulos
2008	Iosif Dalezios	Georgios Tzortzakis	Elpidoforos Potouridis
2009	Ioannis Tamouridis	Vasilis Anastopoulos	Iosif Dalezios
2010	Ioannis Tamouridis	Emmanouil Daskalakis	Periklis Ilias
2011	Ioannis Tamouridis	Panagiotis Exarchopoulos	Pavlos Chalkiopoulos
2012	Ioannis Tamouridis	Polychronis Tzortzakis	Neofytos Sakellaridis-Mangouras
2013	Ioannis Tamouridis	Neofytos Sakellaridis-Mangouras	Polychrónis Tzortzákis
2014	Polychronis Tzortzakis	Ioannis Tamouridis	Neofytos Sakellaridis-Mangouras
2015	Ioannis Tamouridis	Neofytos Sakellaridis-Mangouras	Ioannis Spanopoulos
2016	Ioannis Tamouridis	Stylianos Farantakis	Georgios Bouglas
2017	Polychronis Tzortzakis	Charalampos Kastrantas	Stylianos Farantakis
2018	Stylianos Farantakis	Polychronis Tzortzakis	Charalampos Kastrantas
2019	Polychronis Tzortzakis	Georgios Bouglas	Miltiadis Giannoutsos
2020	Polychronis Tzortzakis	Alexandros Avdelas	Panagiotis Karatsivis
2021	Polychronis Tzortzakis	Alex Mengoulas	Dimitrios Christakos
2022	Periklis Ilias	Miltiadis Giannoutsos	Georgios Bouglas
2023	Miltiadis Giannoutsos	Polychronis Tzortzakis	Nikiforos Arvanitou

=== U23 ===
Year	Gold	Silver	Bronze
2013	Ioannis Spanopoulos	Michail Kortsidakis	—
2015	Ioannis Spanopoulos	Stylianos Farantakis	Michail Kortsidakis
2016	Stylianos Farantakis	Michail Mavrikakis	Zisis Soulios
2017	Stylianos Farantakis	Ioannis Kiriakidis	Georgios Stavrakakis
2018	Miltiadis Giannoutsos	Ioannis Kiriakidis	Zisis Soulios
2019	Georgios Stavrakakis	Miltiadis Giannoutsos	Ioannis Kiriakidis
2020	Dimitrios Christakos	Panagiotis Karatsivis	Sarris Evangelos
2021	Dimitrios Christakos	Panagiotis Karatsivis	Nikolaos Drakos
2022	Sarris Evangelos	Nikolaos Drakos	Georgios Pneumaticos
2023	Nikolaos Drakos	Nikiforos Arvanitou	Ioannis Varotsos

== See also ==
- Greek National Road Race Championships
- National road cycling championships
