= Tour of Greece =

Road bicycle race in Greece

Tour of Hellas

Race details
- Date: April/May
- Region: Greece
- Local name: Ποδηλατικός Γύρος Ελλάδος (in Greek)
- Nickname: ToH
- Discipline: Road
- Competition: UCI Europe Tour
- Type: Stage race
- Organiser: Cycling Greece; Hellenic Cycling Federation
- Web site: www.hellas-tour.gr

History
- First edition: 1968
- Editions: 21
- First winner: Gerhard Nielsen (DEN)
- Most wins: No repeat winners
- Most recent: Harold Martín López (ECU)

The Tour of Hellas is a road bicycle racing stage race. It consists of five stages and is usually held between April and May. The race was first held in 1968 as the Antiquities Trophy, and was later known as the Tour of Hellas (or Greece). The race was held sporadically from 1968 until 2012. The Union Cycliste Internationale (UCI) made the race part of the UCI Europe Tour in 2005; the race had previously been held as an amateur event. The race was revived in 2022 as a category 2.1 event on the UCI Europe Tour.

Cycling Greece is the organizing committee for the race working together with the local authorities of the hosting cities.

== History ==
Nikos Kapsokefalos envisioned the organization of the first Tour of Hellas, drawing inspiration from the popularity of the Tour de France and the Giro d'Italia at the time. The first edition of the race was held in 1968, and was known as the Tour of Ancient Monuments. The first stage was held on 7 October, covering 170 kilometres (110 mi) from Athens to Delphi, and the first overall winner was Danish rider Gerhard Nielsen.

The second edition was held in 1981, 13 years later. That year, Greek riders completed a podium sweep, with Kanellos Kanellopoulos (PO Patras) becoming the first Greek cyclist to win the race.

After several problems, the race, now known as the Tour of Hellas, returned in 2002. The race went on its most recent hiatus after 2012 due to a lack of financial resources and sponsors.

On 13 December 2021, the Greek Ministry of Culture and Sports announced that the race, which was rebranded as the International Tour of Hellas, would return in 2022.

== Past winners ==
Year	Winner	Second	Third
1968	Gerhard Nielsen (DEN)	Noël Vantyghem (BEL)	Břetislav Souček (CZE)
1969–1980	Not Held		
1981	Kanellos Kanellopoulos (GRE)	Evaggelos Papadakis (GRE)	Ilias Kelesidis (GRE)
1982	Henri Manders (NED)	Pascal Kolkhuis Tanke (NED)	Dragić Borovičanin (YUG)
1983	Not Held		
1984	Asiat Saitov (URS)	Evgeni Korolkov (URS)	Vasily Zhdanov (URS)
1985	Jonas Romanovas (URS)	Marat Ganeyev (URS)	Vassili Schpundov (URS)
1986	Roland Königshofer (AUT)	Kanellos Kanellopoulos (GRE)	Stancho Stanchev (BUL)
1987	Olaf Jentzsch (DDR)	Kanellos Kanellopoulos (GRE)	Jan Schur (DDR)
1988	Gintautas Umaras (URS)	Michel Zanoli (NED)	Dan Radtke (DDR)
1989	Frank Kühn (DDR)	Jan Schur (DDR)	Andreas Wartenberg (DDR)
1990–1997	Not Held		
1998	Thomas Liese (GER)	Hristo Zaikov (BUL)	Matthew Stephens (GBR)
1999–2001	Not Held		
2002	Fraser MacMaster (NZL)	Philippe Schnyder (SUI)	Adam Gawlik (POL)
2003	Vasilis Anastopoulos (GRE)	Svetoslav Tchanliev (BUL)	Ioannis Tamouridis (GRE)
2004	Assan Bazayev (KAZ)	André Schulze (GER)	Maxim Iglinskiy (KAZ)
2005	Valeriy Dmitriyev (KAZ)	Alexandr Dymovskikh (KAZ)	Nebojša Jovanović (SRB)
2006	Pavel Brutt (RUS)	Vladimir Koev (BUL)	René Andrle (CZE)
2007–2010	Not Held		
2011	Stefan Schäfer (GER)	Ioannis Tamouridis (GRE)	Markus Fothen (GER)
2012	Robert Vrečer (SLO)	Davide Rebellin (ITA)	Ioannis Tamouridis (GRE)
2013–2021	Not Held		
2022	Aaron Gate (NZL)	Lennert Teugels (BEL)	Mark Stewart (GBR)
2023	Iúri Leitão (POR)	Aaron Gate (NZL)	Stanisław Aniołkowski (POL)
2024	Riccardo Zoidl (AUT)	Hermann Pernsteiner (AUT)	Valerio Conti (ITA)
2025	Harold Martín López (ECU)	Anton Schiffer (GER)	Adrien Maire (FRA)
2026	Václav Ježek (CZE)	Domenico Pozzovivo (ITA)	Nikiforos Arvanitou (GRE)

=== Wins per country ===
Wins	Country
3	Soviet Union
2	East Germany; Greece; Kazakhstan; Germany; New Zealand; Austria
1	Denmark; Netherlands; Russia; Slovenia; Portugal; Ecuador; Czech Republic
