= 2021 Tour of Britain =

2021 UCI Europe Tour 2021 UCI ProSeries
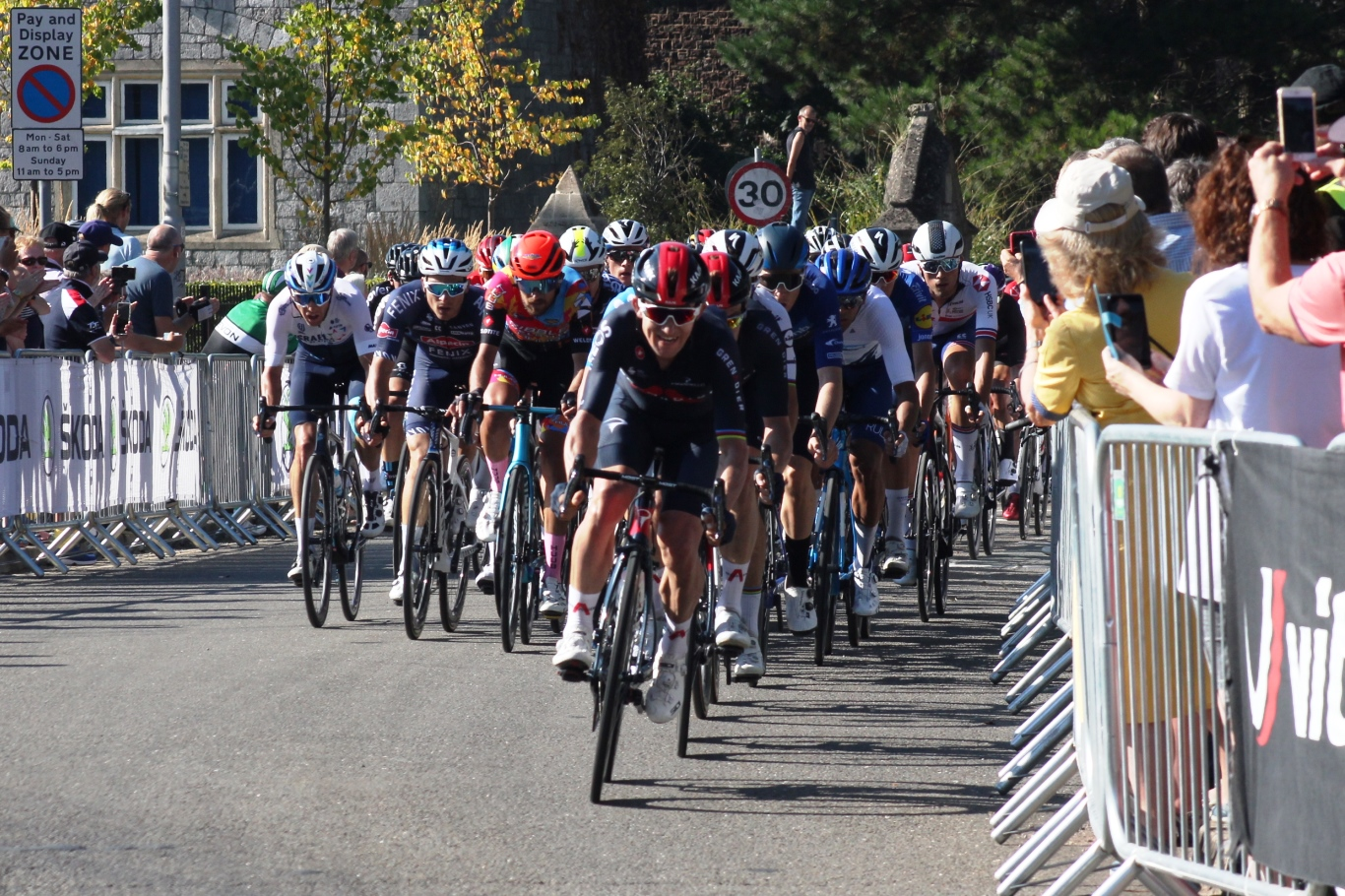
- The race arrives in Exeter on Stage 2

Race details
- Dates: 5 – 12 September 2021
- Stages: 8
- Distance: 1,310.9 km (814.6 mi)
- Winning time: 31h 42' 22"

Results
Jersey awarded to the overall winner	Winner	Wout van Aert (BEL)	(Team Jumbo–Visma)
	Second	Ethan Hayter (GBR)	(Ineos Grenadiers)
	Third	Julian Alaphilippe (FRA)	(Deceuninck–Quick-Step)
Jersey awarded to the points classification winner	Points	Ethan Hayter (GBR)	(Ineos Grenadiers)
Jersey awarded to the mountains classification winner	Mountains	Jacob Scott (GBR)	(Canyon dhb SunGod)
Jersey awarded to the sprints classification winner	Sprints	Jacob Scott (GBR)	(Canyon dhb SunGod)
	Combativity	Jacob Scott (GBR)	(Canyon dhb SunGod)
	Team	Deceuninck–Quick-Step	

The 2021 Tour of Britain was an eight-stage men's professional road cycling stage race. It was the seventeenth running of the modern version of the Tour of Britain and the 80th British tour in total. The race started on 5 September in Penzance, Cornwall, and finished on 12 September in Aberdeen, Scotland.

The 2.Pro-category race was initially scheduled to be a part of the inaugural edition of the UCI ProSeries, but after the 2020 edition was cancelled due to the COVID-19 pandemic, it made its UCI ProSeries debut in 2021, while also still being a part of the 2021 UCI Europe Tour.

== Teams ==
On 22 April 2021, race organizers announced the first confirmed teams that would be participating in the race, with those being all five British UCI Continental teams and a British national team. On 10 August 2021, the rest of the invited teams were announced. Seven UCI WorldTeams, four UCI ProTeams, six UCI Continental teams, and the British national team made up the eighteen teams that participated in the race. Arkéa–Samsic, with five riders, was the only team to not enter a full squad of six riders. In total, 107 riders started the race, of which 94 finished.

UCI WorldTeams

- Deceuninck–Quick-Step
- Ineos Grenadiers
- Israel Start-Up Nation
- Movistar Team
- Team DSM
- Team Jumbo–Visma
- Team Qhubeka NextHash

UCI ProTeams

- Alpecin–Fenix
- Arkéa–Samsic
- Caja Rural–Seguros RGA
- Rally Cycling

UCI Continental Teams

- Canyon dhb SunGod
- Global 6 Cycling
- Ribble Weldtite
- Saint Piran
- SwiftCarbon Pro Cycling
- Trinity Racing

National Teams

- Great Britain

== Route ==
On 17 March 2021, the start and finish venues, along with partial route details, were unveiled, with some of the route from the cancelled 2020 edition carried over to this year's edition. Cornwall made its race debut as it hosted the Grand Départ and the first stage, before the race continued north into Devon for stage 2. Wales then hosted two full stages for the first time in race history. From there, the race entered North West England, as Cheshire hosted stage 5, while stage 6 started in Cumbria and headed east into North East England. The last two stages took place in Scotland, with Hawick and Aberdeen making their race debuts, while Edinburgh was a first-time finish location. On 20 July, the rest of the route was released.

Stage characteristics and winners
Stage	Date	Course	Distance	Type	Winner
1	5 September	Penzance to Bodmin	180.8 km (112.3 mi)	Flat stage	Wout van Aert (BEL)
2	6 September	Sherford to Exeter	183.9 km (114.3 mi)	Hilly stage	Robin Carpenter (USA)
3	7 September	Llandeilo to National Botanic Garden of Wales	18.2 km (11.3 mi)	Team time trial	Ineos Grenadiers
4	8 September	Aberaeron to Great Orme (Llandudno)	210 km (130 mi)	Mountain stage	Wout van Aert (BEL)
5	9 September	Alderley Park to Warrington	152.2 km (94.6 mi)	Flat stage	Ethan Hayter (GBR)
6	10 September	Carlisle to Gateshead	198 km (123 mi)	Mountain stage	Wout van Aert (BEL)
7	11 September	Hawick to Edinburgh	194.8 km (121.0 mi)	Hilly stage	Yves Lampaert (BEL)
8	12 September	Stonehaven to Aberdeen	173 km (107 mi)	Hilly stage	Wout van Aert (BEL)
Total			1,310.9 km (814.6 mi)		

== Stages ==
=== Stage 1 ===
5 September 2021 — Penzance to Bodmin, 180.8 km (112.3 mi)

Stage 1

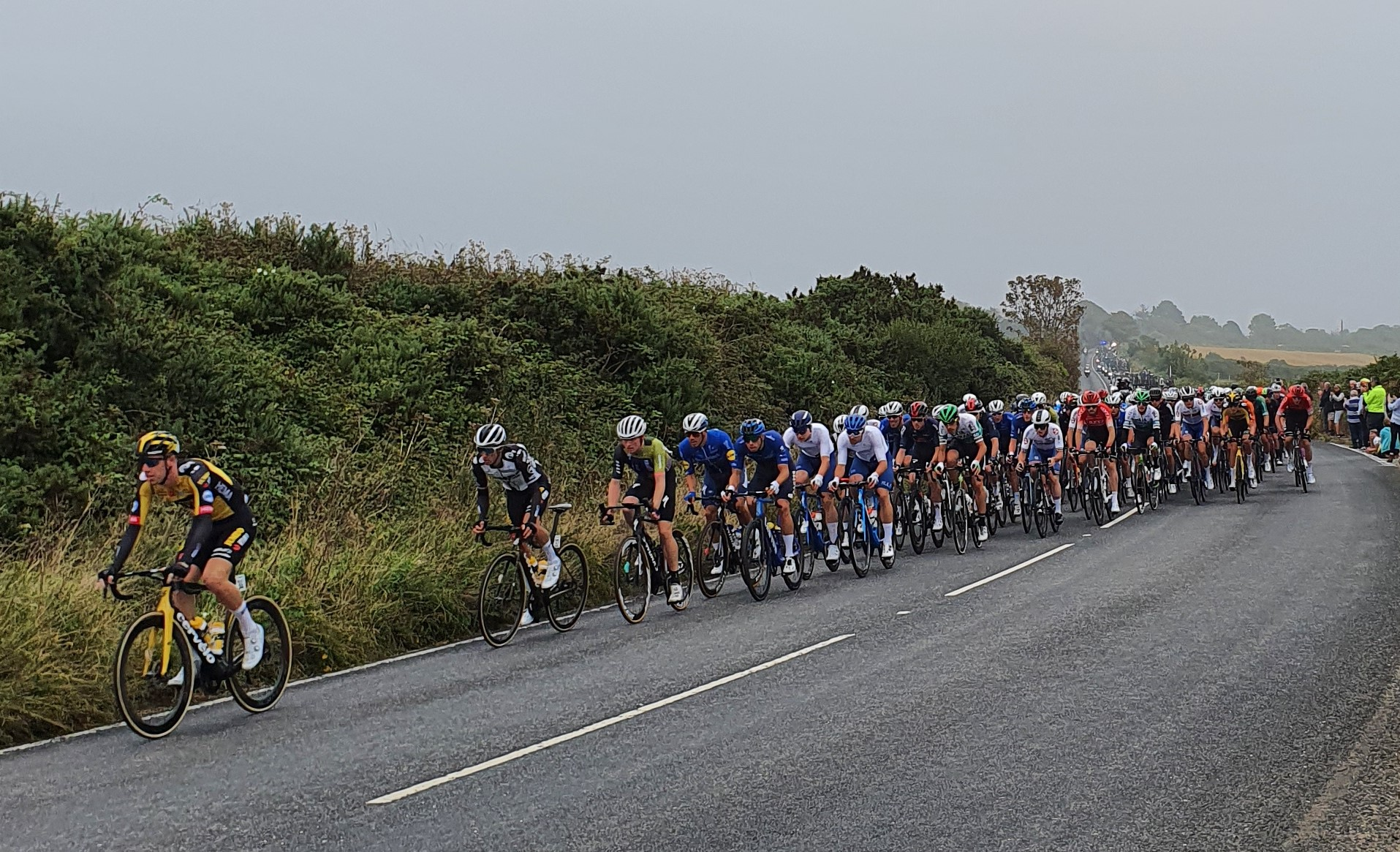
The peloton just outside Penzance, in the first kilometres of the stage

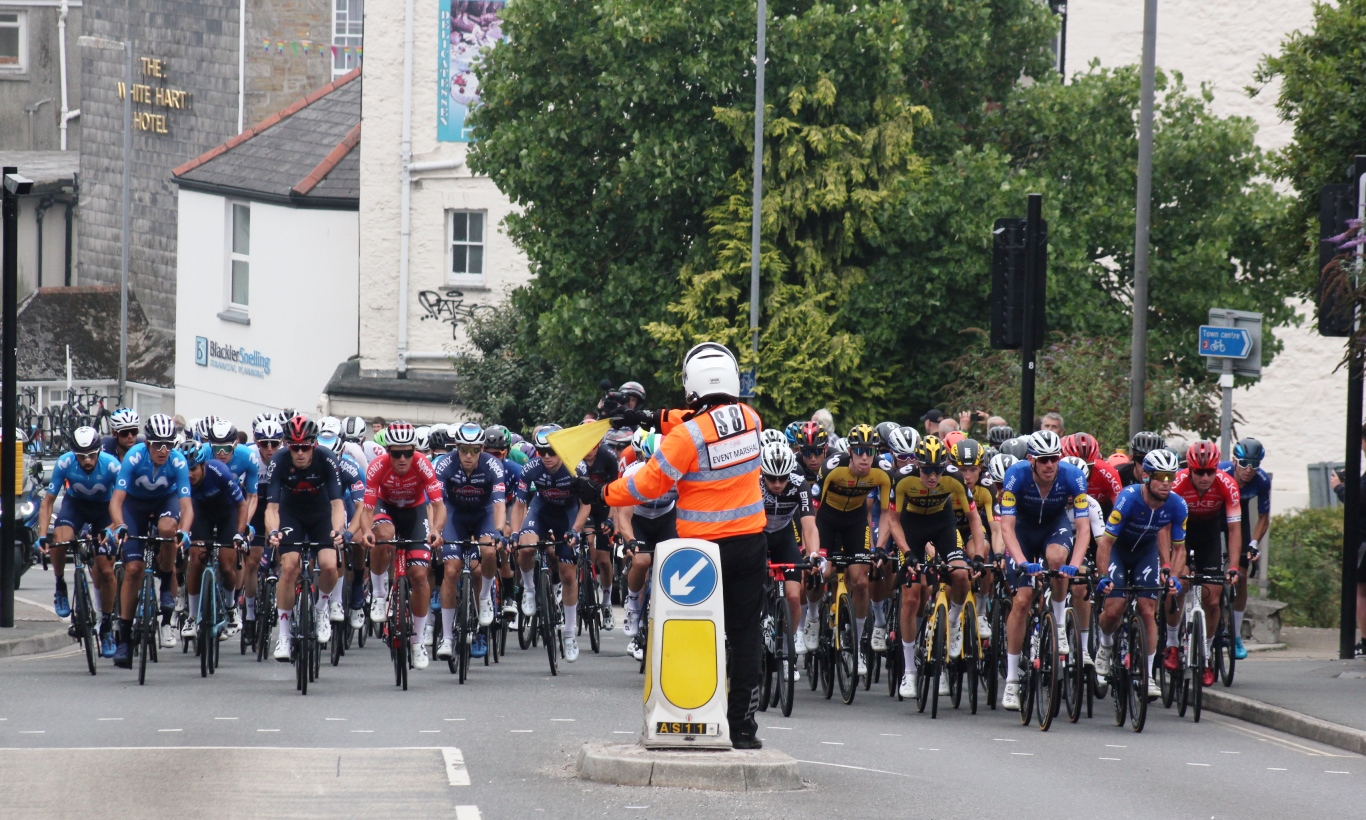
The peloton in St Austell

Stage 1 Result
Rank	Rider	Team	Time
1	Wout van Aert (BEL)	Team Jumbo–Visma	4h 33' 36"
2	Nils Eekhoff (NED)	Team DSM	+ 0"
3	Gonzalo Serrano (ESP)	Movistar Team	+ 0"
4	Ethan Hayter (GBR)	Ineos Grenadiers	+ 0"
5	Rory Townsend (IRL)	Canyon dhb SunGod	+ 2"
6	Michael Woods (CAN)	Israel Start-Up Nation	+ 2"
7	Giacomo Nizzolo (ITA)	Team Qhubeka NextHash	+ 2"
8	Julian Alaphilippe (FRA)	Deceuninck–Quick-Step	+ 2"
9	Xandro Meurisse (BEL)	Alpecin–Fenix	+ 2"
10	Kristian Sbaragli (ITA)	Alpecin–Fenix	+ 2"

General classification after Stage 1
Rank	Rider	Team	Time
1	Wout van Aert (BEL)	Team Jumbo–Visma	4h 33' 26"
2	Nils Eekhoff (NED)	Team DSM	+ 4"
3	Gonzalo Serrano (ESP)	Movistar Team	+ 6"
4	Ethan Hayter (GBR)	Ineos Grenadiers	+ 10"
5	Rory Townsend (IRL)	Canyon dhb SunGod	+ 12"
6	Michael Woods (CAN)	Israel Start-Up Nation	+ 12"
7	Giacomo Nizzolo (ITA)	Team Qhubeka NextHash	+ 12"
8	Julian Alaphilippe (FRA)	Deceuninck–Quick-Step	+ 12"
9	Xandro Meurisse (BEL)	Alpecin–Fenix	+ 12"
10	Kristian Sbaragli (ITA)	Alpecin–Fenix	+ 12"

=== Stage 2 ===
6 September 2021 — Sherford to Exeter, 183.9 km (114.3 mi)

Stage 2

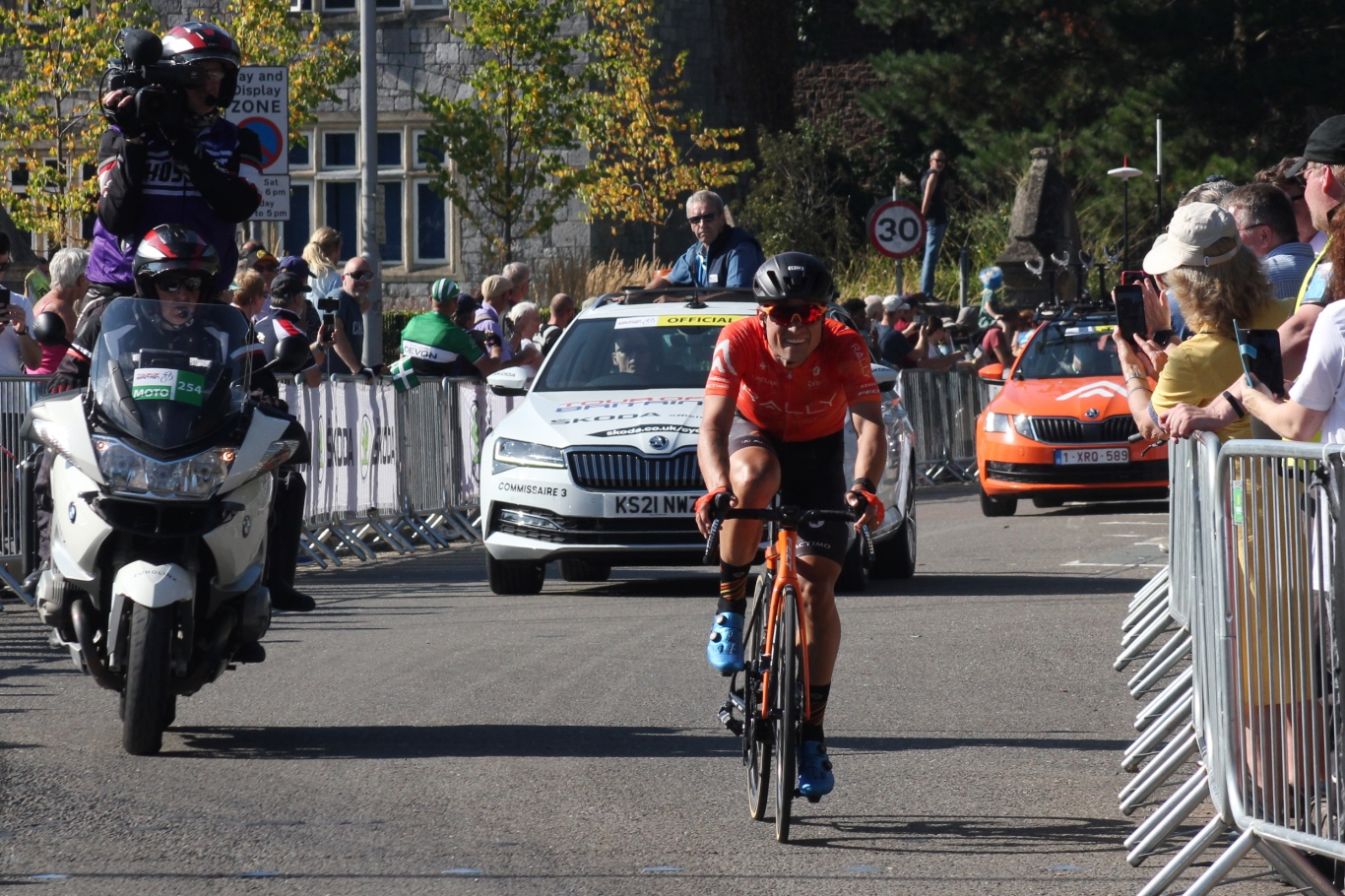
Stage winner Robin Carpenter, the only surviving member of the day's breakaway, rides into Exeter

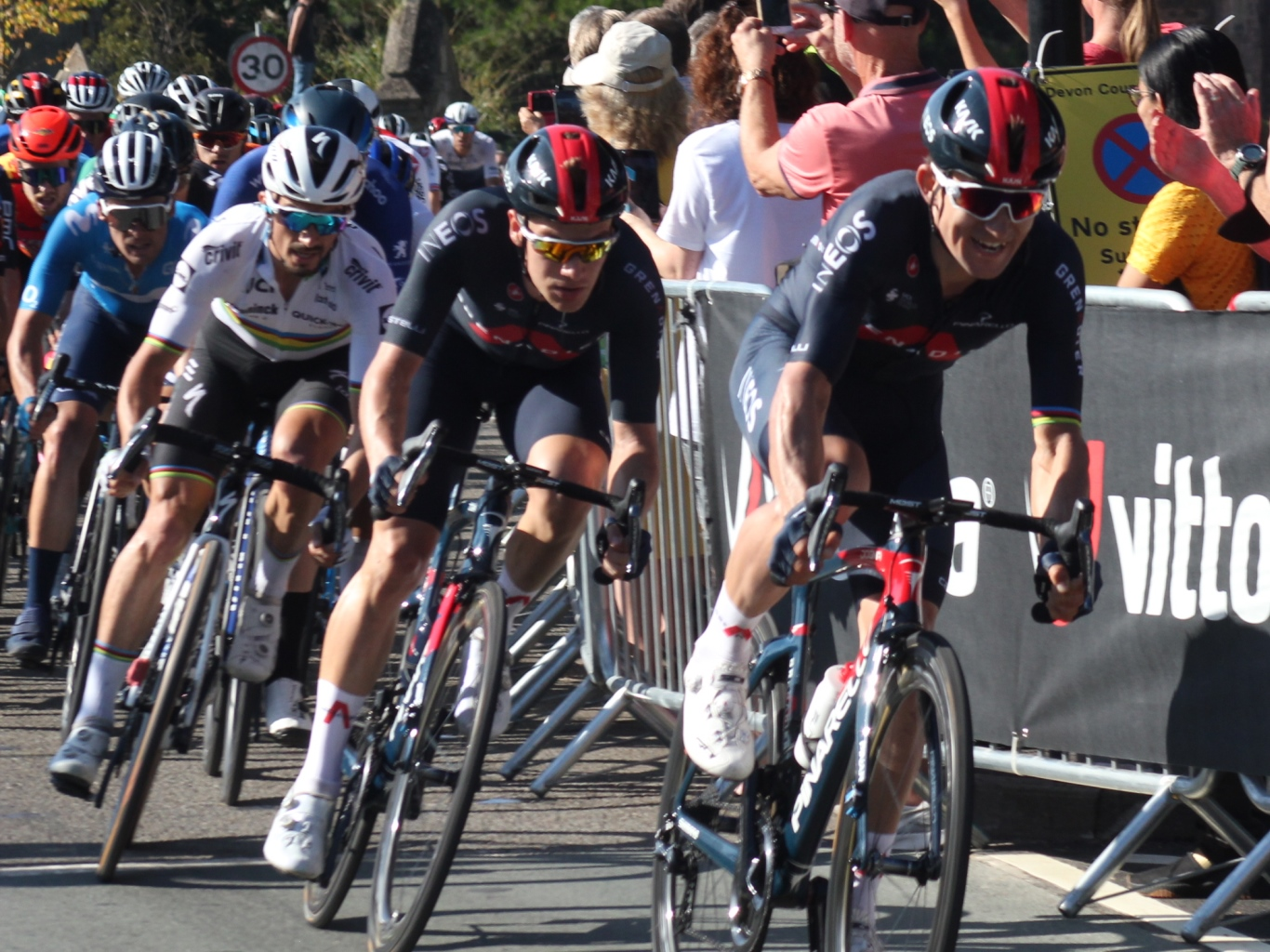
Michał Kwiatkowski leads Ethan Hayter and world road race champion Julian Alaphilippe in Exeter at the front of the peloton

Stage 2 Result
Rank	Rider	Team	Time
1	Robin Carpenter (USA)	Rally Cycling	4h 45' 56"
2	Ethan Hayter (GBR)	Ineos Grenadiers	+ 33"
3	Alex Peters (GBR)	SwiftCarbon Pro Cycling	+ 33"
4	Max Kanter (GER)	Team DSM	+ 33"
5	Julian Alaphilippe (FRA)	Deceuninck–Quick-Step	+ 33"
6	Rory Townsend (IRL)	Canyon dhb SunGod	+ 33"
7	Mikkel Frølich Honoré (DEN)	Deceuninck–Quick-Step	+ 33"
8	Ethan Vernon (GBR)	Great Britain	+ 33"
9	Kristian Sbaragli (ITA)	Alpecin–Fenix	+ 33"
10	Giacomo Nizzolo (ITA)	Team Qhubeka NextHash	+ 33"

General classification after Stage 2
Rank	Rider	Team	Time
1	Robin Carpenter (USA)	Rally Cycling	9h 19' 33"
2	Wout van Aert (BEL)	Team Jumbo–Visma	+ 22"
3	Ethan Hayter (GBR)	Ineos Grenadiers	+ 26"
4	Gonzalo Serrano (ESP)	Movistar Team	+ 28"
5	Alex Peters (GBR)	SwiftCarbon Pro Cycling	+ 28"
6	Rory Townsend (IRL)	Canyon dhb SunGod	+ 32"
7	Julian Alaphilippe (FRA)	Deceuninck–Quick-Step	+ 32"
8	Giacomo Nizzolo (ITA)	Team Qhubeka NextHash	+ 32"
9	Kristian Sbaragli (ITA)	Alpecin–Fenix	+ 32"
10	Mikkel Frølich Honoré (DEN)	Deceuninck–Quick-Step	+ 32"

=== Stage 3 ===
7 September 2021 — Llandeilo to National Botanic Garden of Wales, 18.2 km (11.3 mi) (TTT)

Stage 3 Result
Rank	Team	Time
1	Ineos Grenadiers	20' 22"
2	Deceuninck–Quick-Step	+ 17"
3	Team Jumbo–Visma	+ 20"
4	Israel Start-Up Nation	+ 43"
5	Team DSM	+ 57"
6	Alpecin–Fenix	+ 57"
7	Movistar Team	+ 1' 08"
8	Ribble Weldtite	+ 1' 09"
9	Trinity Racing	+ 1' 24"
10	Arkéa–Samsic	+ 1' 28"

General classification after Stage 3
Rank	Rider	Team	Time
1	Ethan Hayter (GBR)	Ineos Grenadiers	9h 40' 21"
2	Rohan Dennis (AUS)	Ineos Grenadiers	+ 6"
3	Wout van Aert (BEL)	Team Jumbo–Visma	+ 16"
4	Julian Alaphilippe (FRA)	Deceuninck–Quick-Step	+ 23"
5	Mikkel Frølich Honoré (DEN)	Deceuninck–Quick-Step	+ 23"
6	Pascal Eenkhoorn (NED)	Team Jumbo–Visma	+ 38"
7	Michael Woods (CAN)	Israel Start-Up Nation	+ 49"
8	Dan Martin (IRL)	Israel Start-Up Nation	+ 49"
9	Kristian Sbaragli (ITA)	Alpecin–Fenix	+ 1' 03"
10	Xandro Meurisse (BEL)	Alpecin–Fenix	+ 1' 03"

=== Stage 4 ===
8 September 2021 — Aberaeron to Great Orme (Llandudno), 210 km (130 mi)

Stage 4 Result
Rank	Rider	Team	Time
1	Wout van Aert (BEL)	Team Jumbo–Visma	5h 04' 22"
2	Julian Alaphilippe (FRA)	Deceuninck–Quick-Step	+ 0"
3	Michael Woods (CAN)	Israel Start-Up Nation	+ 1"
4	Mikkel Frølich Honoré (DEN)	Deceuninck–Quick-Step	+ 4"
5	Ethan Hayter (GBR)	Ineos Grenadiers	+ 8"
6	Dan Martin (IRL)	Israel Start-Up Nation	+ 13"
7	Kristian Sbaragli (ITA)	Alpecin–Fenix	+ 16"
8	Simon Clarke (AUS)	Team Qhubeka NextHash	+ 16"
9	Sergio Martín (ESP)	Caja Rural–Seguros RGA	+ 27"
10	Nicolas Roche (IRL)	Team DSM	+ 29"

General classification after Stage 4
Rank	Rider	Team	Time
1	Wout van Aert (BEL)	Team Jumbo–Visma	14h 44' 49"
2	Ethan Hayter (GBR)	Ineos Grenadiers	+ 2"
3	Julian Alaphilippe (FRA)	Deceuninck–Quick-Step	+ 11"
4	Mikkel Frølich Honoré (DEN)	Deceuninck–Quick-Step	+ 21"
5	Michael Woods (CAN)	Israel Start-Up Nation	+ 40"
6	Rohan Dennis (AUS)	Ineos Grenadiers	+ 44"
7	Dan Martin (IRL)	Israel Start-Up Nation	+ 56"
8	Kristian Sbaragli (ITA)	Alpecin–Fenix	+ 1' 13"
9	Mark Donovan (GBR)	Team DSM	+ 1' 34"
10	Xandro Meurisse (BEL)	Alpecin–Fenix	+ 1' 38"

=== Stage 5 ===
9 September 2021 — Alderley Park to Warrington, 152.2 km (94.6 mi)

Stage 5 Result
Rank	Rider	Team	Time
1	Ethan Hayter (GBR)	Ineos Grenadiers	3h 33' 01"
2	Giacomo Nizzolo (ITA)	Team Qhubeka NextHash	+ 0"
3	Daniel McLay (GBR)	Arkéa–Samsic	+ 0"
4	Luke Lamperti (USA)	Trinity Racing	+ 0"
5	Mark Cavendish (GBR)	Deceuninck–Quick-Step	+ 0"
6	Colin Joyce (USA)	Rally Cycling	+ 0"
7	Michał Paluta (POL)	Global 6 Cycling	+ 0"
8	Julian Alaphilippe (FRA)	Deceuninck–Quick-Step	+ 0"
9	Gonzalo Serrano (ESP)	Movistar Team	+ 0"
10	Kristian Sbaragli (ITA)	Alpecin–Fenix	+ 0"

General classification after Stage 5
Rank	Rider	Team	Time
1	Ethan Hayter (GBR)	Ineos Grenadiers	18h 17' 42"
2	Wout van Aert (BEL)	Team Jumbo–Visma	+ 8"
3	Julian Alaphilippe (FRA)	Deceuninck–Quick-Step	+ 19"
4	Mikkel Frølich Honoré (DEN)	Deceuninck–Quick-Step	+ 29"
5	Michael Woods (CAN)	Israel Start-Up Nation	+ 48"
6	Rohan Dennis (AUS)	Ineos Grenadiers	+ 52"
7	Dan Martin (IRL)	Israel Start-Up Nation	+ 1' 04"
8	Kristian Sbaragli (ITA)	Alpecin–Fenix	+ 1' 21"
9	Mark Donovan (GBR)	Team DSM	+ 1' 42"
10	Xandro Meurisse (BEL)	Alpecin–Fenix	+ 1' 46"

=== Stage 6 ===
10 September 2021 — Carlisle to Gateshead, 198 km (123 mi)

Stage 6 Result
Rank	Rider	Team	Time
1	Wout van Aert (BEL)	Team Jumbo–Visma	4h 35' 56"
2	Ethan Hayter (GBR)	Ineos Grenadiers	+ 0"
3	Julian Alaphilippe (FRA)	Deceuninck–Quick-Step	+ 0"
4	Gonzalo Serrano (ESP)	Movistar Team	+ 0"
5	James Shaw (GBR)	Ribble Weldtite	+ 0"
6	Michael Woods (CAN)	Israel Start-Up Nation	+ 0"
7	Dan Martin (IRL)	Israel Start-Up Nation	+ 0"
8	Mikkel Frølich Honoré (DEN)	Deceuninck–Quick-Step	+ 0"
9	Matteo Jorgenson (USA)	Movistar Team	+ 4"
10	Carlos Rodríguez (ESP)	Ineos Grenadiers	+ 4"

General classification after Stage 6
Rank	Rider	Team	Time
1	Ethan Hayter (GBR)	Ineos Grenadiers	22h 53' 32"
2	Wout van Aert (BEL)	Team Jumbo–Visma	+ 4"
3	Julian Alaphilippe (FRA)	Deceuninck–Quick-Step	+ 21"
4	Mikkel Frølich Honoré (DEN)	Deceuninck–Quick-Step	+ 35"
5	Michael Woods (CAN)	Israel Start-Up Nation	+ 54"
6	Rohan Dennis (AUS)	Ineos Grenadiers	+ 1' 08"
7	Dan Martin (IRL)	Israel Start-Up Nation	+ 1' 10"
8	Kristian Sbaragli (ITA)	Alpecin–Fenix	+ 1' 37"
9	Mark Donovan (GBR)	Team DSM	+ 1' 58"
10	Carlos Rodríguez (ESP)	Ineos Grenadiers	+ 2' 01"

=== Stage 7 ===
11 September 2021 — Hawick to Edinburgh, 194.8 km (121.0 mi)

Stage 7 Result
Rank	Rider	Team	Time
1	Yves Lampaert (BEL)	Deceuninck–Quick-Step	4h 39' 09"
2	Matteo Jorgenson (USA)	Movistar Team	+ 0"
3	Matthew Gibson (GBR)	Ribble Weldtite	+ 0"
4	Davide Ballerini (ITA)	Deceuninck–Quick-Step	+ 35"
5	Pascal Eenkhoorn (NED)	Team Jumbo–Visma	+ 41"
6	Ethan Hayter (GBR)	Ineos Grenadiers	+ 1' 51"
7	Wout van Aert (BEL)	Team Jumbo–Visma	+ 1' 51"
8	Max Kanter (GER)	Team DSM	+ 1' 51"
9	Rohan Dennis (AUS)	Ineos Grenadiers	+ 1' 51"
10	Kristian Sbaragli (ITA)	Alpecin–Fenix	+ 1' 51"

General classification after Stage 7
Rank	Rider	Team	Time
1	Ethan Hayter (GBR)	Ineos Grenadiers	27h 34' 32"
2	Wout van Aert (BEL)	Team Jumbo–Visma	+ 4"
3	Julian Alaphilippe (FRA)	Deceuninck–Quick-Step	+ 21"
4	Mikkel Frølich Honoré (DEN)	Deceuninck–Quick-Step	+ 35"
5	Michael Woods (CAN)	Israel Start-Up Nation	+ 54"
6	Rohan Dennis (AUS)	Ineos Grenadiers	+ 1' 08"
7	Dan Martin (IRL)	Israel Start-Up Nation	+ 1' 10"
8	Kristian Sbaragli (ITA)	Alpecin–Fenix	+ 1' 37"
9	Mark Donovan (GBR)	Team DSM	+ 1' 58"
10	Carlos Rodríguez (ESP)	Ineos Grenadiers	+ 2' 01"

=== Stage 8 ===
12 September 2021 — Stonehaven to Aberdeen, 173 km (107 mi)

Stage 8 Result
Rank	Rider	Team	Time
1	Wout van Aert (BEL)	Team Jumbo–Visma	4h 07' 56"
2	André Greipel (GER)	Israel Start-Up Nation	+ 0"
3	Mark Cavendish (GBR)	Deceuninck–Quick-Step	+ 0"
4	Colin Joyce (USA)	Rally Cycling	+ 0"
5	Max Kanter (GER)	Team DSM	+ 0"
6	Rory Townsend (IRL)	Canyon dhb SunGod	+ 0"
7	Matthew Gibson (GBR)	Ribble Weldtite	+ 0"
8	Oliver Peckover (GBR)	SwiftCarbon Pro Cycling	+ 0"
9	Matthew Bostock (GBR)	Canyon dhb SunGod	+ 0"
10	Gabriel Cullaigh (GBR)	Movistar Team	+ 0"

General classification after Stage 8
Rank	Rider	Team	Time
1	Wout van Aert (BEL)	Team Jumbo–Visma	31h 42' 22"
2	Ethan Hayter (GBR)	Ineos Grenadiers	+ 6"
3	Julian Alaphilippe (FRA)	Deceuninck–Quick-Step	+ 27"
4	Mikkel Frølich Honoré (DEN)	Deceuninck–Quick-Step	+ 41"
5	Michael Woods (CAN)	Israel Start-Up Nation	+ 1' 00"
6	Rohan Dennis (AUS)	Ineos Grenadiers	+ 1' 14"
7	Dan Martin (IRL)	Israel Start-Up Nation	+ 1' 16"
8	Kristian Sbaragli (ITA)	Alpecin–Fenix	+ 1' 43"
9	Mark Donovan (GBR)	Team DSM	+ 2' 04"
10	Carlos Rodríguez (ESP)	Ineos Grenadiers	+ 2' 07"

== Classification leadership table ==
Classification leadership by stage
Stage	Winner	General classification	Points classification	Mountains classification	Sprints classification	Team classification
1	Wout van Aert	Wout van Aert	Wout van Aert	Jacob Scott	Jacob Scott	Ineos Grenadiers
2	Robin Carpenter	Robin Carpenter	Ethan Hayter	Jacob Scott	Jacob Scott	Ineos Grenadiers
3	Ineos Grenadiers	Ethan Hayter	Ethan Hayter	Jacob Scott	Jacob Scott	Ineos Grenadiers
4	Wout van Aert	Wout van Aert	Ethan Hayter	Jacob Scott	Jacob Scott	Ineos Grenadiers
5	Ethan Hayter	Ethan Hayter	Ethan Hayter	Jacob Scott	Jacob Scott	Ineos Grenadiers
6	Wout van Aert	Ethan Hayter	Ethan Hayter	Jacob Scott	Jacob Scott	Ineos Grenadiers
7	Yves Lampaert	Ethan Hayter	Ethan Hayter	Jacob Scott	Jacob Scott	Deceuninck–Quick-Step
8	Wout van Aert	Wout van Aert	Ethan Hayter	Jacob Scott	Jacob Scott	Deceuninck–Quick-Step
Final		Wout van Aert	Ethan Hayter	Jacob Scott	Jacob Scott	Deceuninck–Quick-Step

- On stage 2, Nils Eekhoff, who was second in the points classification, wore the cyan jersey, because first-placed Wout van Aert wore the blue jersey as the leader of the general classification.
- On stage 2, Max Walker, who was second in the sprints classification, wore the red jersey, because first-placed Jacob Scott wore the green jersey as the leader of the mountains classification. On stage 3, Walker, who dropped down to third, continued to wear the red jersey, in place of first-placed Scott and second-placed Robin Carpenter, who wore the blue jersey as the leader of the general classification.
- On stage 4, Rory Townsend, who was second in the points classification, wore the cyan jersey, because first-placed Ethan Hayter wore the blue jersey as the leader of the general classification.
- On stages 4–8, Robin Carpenter, who was second in the sprints classification, wore the red jersey, because first-placed Jacob Scott wore the green jersey as the leader of the mountains classification.
- On stage 6, Kristian Sbaragli, who was fifth in the points classification, wore the cyan jersey, because first-placed Ethan Hayter wore the blue jersey as the leader of the general classification, second-placed Julian Alaphilippe wore the rainbow jersey as the defending world road race champion, third-placed Wout van Aert wore the Belgian jersey as the defending Belgian road race champion, and fourth-placed Giacomo Nizzolo wore the European jersey as the defending European road race champion.
- On stage 7, Michael Woods, who was fourth in the points classification, wore the cyan jersey, because first-placed Ethan Hayter wore the blue jersey as the leader of the general classification, second-placed Julian Alaphilippe wore the rainbow jersey as the defending world road race champion, and third-placed Wout van Aert wore the Belgian jersey as the defending Belgian road race champion. For the same reason, Gonzalo Serrano wore the cyan jersey on stage 8.

== Final classification standings ==
Legend
Denotes the winner of the general classification	Denotes the winner of the mountains classification
Denotes the winner of the points classification	Denotes the winner of the sprints classification

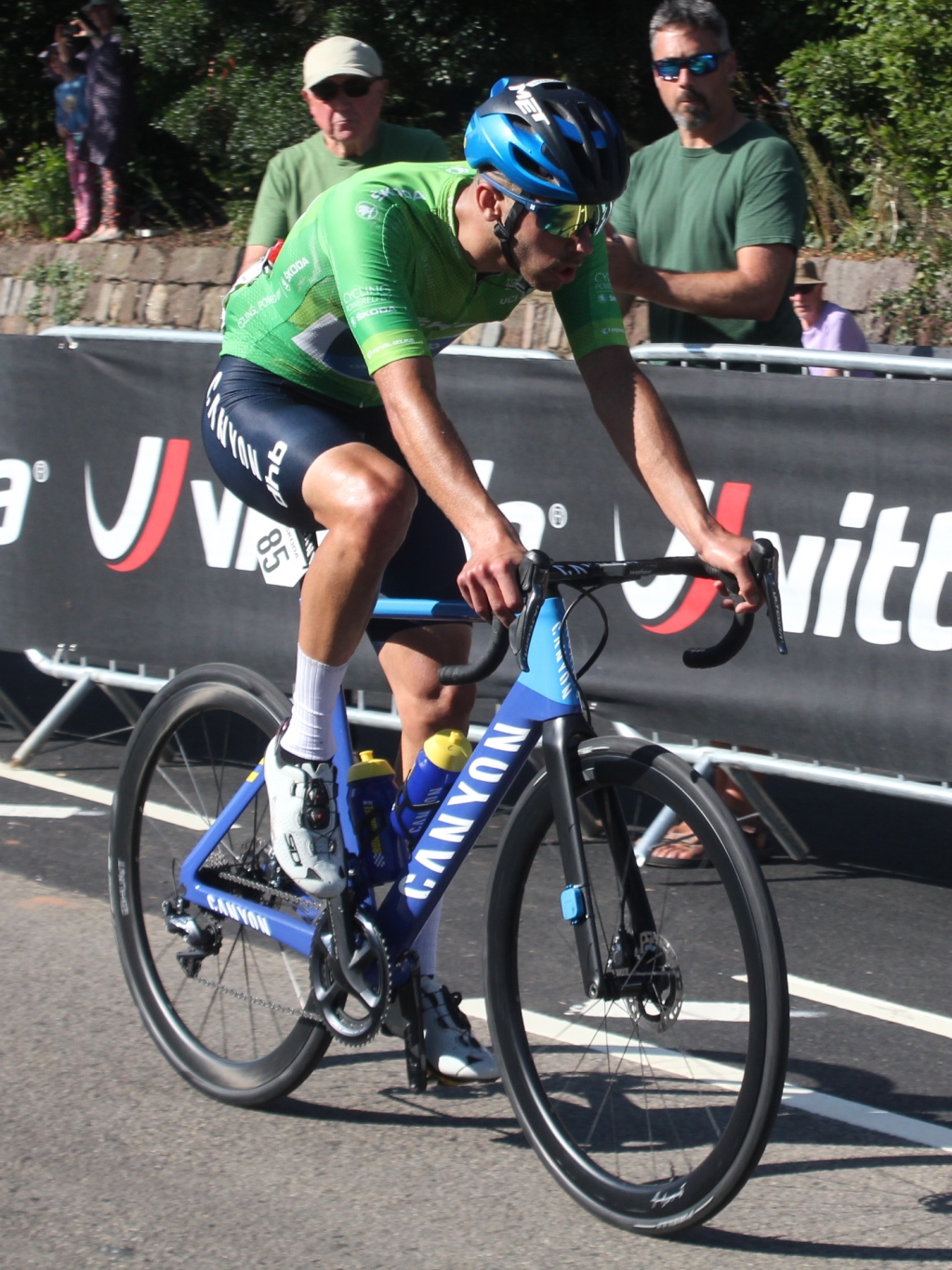
Jacob Scott, winner of the mountains and sprints classifications, in the green jersey on stage 2

=== General classification ===
Final general classification (1–10)
Rank	Rider	Team	Time
1	Wout van Aert (BEL)	Team Jumbo–Visma	31h 42' 22"
2	Ethan Hayter (GBR)	Ineos Grenadiers	+ 6"
3	Julian Alaphilippe (FRA)	Deceuninck–Quick-Step	+ 27"
4	Mikkel Frølich Honoré (DEN)	Deceuninck–Quick-Step	+ 41"
5	Michael Woods (CAN)	Israel Start-Up Nation	+ 1' 00"
6	Rohan Dennis (AUS)	Ineos Grenadiers	+ 1' 14"
7	Dan Martin (IRL)	Israel Start-Up Nation	+ 1' 16"
8	Kristian Sbaragli (ITA)	Alpecin–Fenix	+ 1' 43"
9	Mark Donovan (GBR)	Team DSM	+ 2' 04"
10	Carlos Rodríguez (ESP)	Ineos Grenadiers	+ 2' 07"

=== Points classification ===
Final points classification (1–10)
Rank	Rider	Team	Points
1	Ethan Hayter (GBR)	Ineos Grenadiers	81
2	Wout van Aert (BEL)	Team Jumbo–Visma	69
3	Julian Alaphilippe (FRA)	Deceuninck–Quick-Step	58
4	Gonzalo Serrano (ESP)	Movistar Team	35
5	Kristian Sbaragli (ITA)	Alpecin–Fenix	34
6	Michael Woods (CAN)	Israel Start-Up Nation	33
7	Mikkel Frølich Honoré (DEN)	Deceuninck–Quick-Step	32
8	Rory Townsend (IRL)	Canyon dhb SunGod	31
9	Max Kanter (GER)	Team DSM	31
10	Mark Cavendish (GBR)	Deceuninck–Quick-Step	27

=== Mountains classification ===
Final mountains classification (1–10)
Rank	Rider	Team	Points
1	Jacob Scott (GBR)	Canyon dhb SunGod	66
2	Nícolas Sessler (BRA)	Global 6 Cycling	32
3	Rory Townsend (IRL)	Canyon dhb SunGod	30
4	Robin Carpenter (USA)	Rally Cycling	29
5	Tim Declercq (BEL)	Deceuninck–Quick-Step	24
6	George Bennett (NZL)	Team Jumbo–Visma	24
7	Jokin Murguialday (ESP)	Caja Rural–Seguros RGA	20
8	Colin Joyce (USA)	Rally Cycling	19
9	Jimmy Janssens (BEL)	Alpecin–Fenix	19
10	Daniel McLay (GBR)	Arkéa–Samsic	18

=== Sprints classification ===
Final sprints classification (1–10)
Rank	Rider	Team	Points
1	Jacob Scott (GBR)	Canyon dhb SunGod	26
2	Robin Carpenter (USA)	Rally Cycling	14
3	Rory Townsend (IRL)	Canyon dhb SunGod	9
4	Michał Paluta (POL)	Global 6 Cycling	6
5	Leon Mazzone (GBR)	Saint Piran	6
6	Pascal Eenkhoorn (NED)	Team Jumbo–Visma	4
7	Thomas Gloag (GBR)	Trinity Racing	4
8	Yves Lampaert (BEL)	Deceuninck–Quick-Step	4
9	George Bennett (NZL)	Team Jumbo–Visma	4
10	Max Walker (GBR)	Trinity Racing	4

=== Team classification ===
Final team classification (1–10)
Rank	Team	Time
1	Deceuninck–Quick-Step	94h 28' 34"
2	Ineos Grenadiers	+ 23"
3	Team DSM	+ 3' 23"
4	Arkéa–Samsic	+ 3' 44"
5	Alpecin–Fenix	+ 3' 52"
6	Israel Start-Up Nation	+ 7' 58"
7	Caja Rural–Seguros RGA	+ 11' 15"
8	Rally Cycling	+ 11' 47"
9	Canyon dhb SunGod	+ 14' 37"
10	Movistar Team	+ 16' 42"
