= 2023 International Tour of Hellas =

Cycling race

2023 UCI Europe Tour

Race details
- Dates: 2–6 May 2023
- Stages: 4 + Prologue
- Distance: 660.6 km (410.5 mi)

Results
Jersey awarded to the overall winner	Winner	Iúri Leitão (POR)	(Caja Rural–Seguros RGA)
	Second	Aaron Gate (NZL)	(Bolton Equities Black Spoke)
	Third	Stanisław Aniołkowski (POL)	(Human Powered Health)
Jersey awarded to the points classification winner	Points	Iúri Leitão (POR)	(Caja Rural–Seguros RGA)
Jersey awarded to the mountains classification winner	Mountains	Andreas Miltiadis (CYP)	(Cyprus)
Jersey awarded to the youth classification winner	Youth	Logan Currie (NZL)	(Bolton Equities Black Spoke)
	Team	Bolton Equities Black Spoke	

The 2023 International Tour of Hellas was a road cycling stage race held between 2 and 6 May 2023 in Greece. It will be the 19th edition of the Tour of Greece.

== Teams ==
Six UCI ProTeams, ten UCI Continental and three National teams participated in the race. The peloton consisted of 114 riders with all teams bringing 6 riders.

UCI ProTeams

- Bingoal WB
- Bolton Equities Black Spoke
- Caja Rural–Seguros RGA
- Green Project–Bardiani–CSF–Faizanè
- Human Powered Health
- Team Corratec–Selle Italia

UCI Continental Teams

- Cross Team Legendre
- ABLOC CT
- ATT Investments
- Bike Aid
- Global 6 Cycling
- HRE Mazowsze Serce Polski
- Sofer–Savini Due–OMZ
- Tarteletto–Isorex
- Terengganu Polygon Cycling Team
- X-Speed United

National teams

- Cyprus
- Greece
- United States

== Route ==
The 2023 edition included five stages covering 660.6 kilometres (410.5 mi) over five days.

Stage characteristics and winners
Stage	Date	Course	Distance	Type	Stage winner
P	2 May	Heraklion to Heraklion	6.0 km (3.7 mi)	Individual time trial	Aaron Gate (NZL)
1	3 May	Heraklion to Heraklion	187.7 km (116.6 mi)	Hilly stage	Stanisław Aniołkowski (POL)
2	4 May	Mycenae to Kalamata	170.3 km (105.8 mi)	Hilly stage	Timothy Dupont (BEL)
3	5 May	Costa Navarino to Kyparissia	153 km (95 mi)	Hilly stage	Iúri Leitão (POR)
4	6 May	Costa Navarino to Ancient Olympia	133.5 km (83.0 mi)	Hilly stage	Stanisław Aniołkowski (POL)
Total			660.6 km (410.5 mi)		

== Stages ==
=== Prologue ===
2 May 2023 — Heraklion to Heraklion, 6.0 km (3.7 mi)

Prologue Result
Rank	Rider	Team	Time
1	Aaron Gate (NZL)	Bolton Equities Black Spoke	7' 30"
2	Rory Townsend (IRL)	Bolton Equities Black Spoke	+ 9"
3	Logan Currie (NZL)	Bolton Equities Black Spoke	+ 14"
4	Andreas Miltiadis (CYP)	Cyprus	+ 14"
5	Jakub Otruba (CZE)	ATT Investments	+ 15"
6	Daniel Turek (CZE)	ATT Investments	+ 18"
7	Bart Lemmen (NED)	Human Powered Health	+ 20"
8	Iúri Leitão (POR)	Caja Rural–Seguros RGA	+ 20"
9	Tom Sexton (NZL)	Bolton Equities Black Spoke	+ 21"
10	Stanisław Aniołkowski (POL)	Human Powered Health	+ 22"

General classification after Prologue
Rank	Rider	Team	Time
1	Aaron Gate (NZL)	Bolton Equities Black Spoke	7' 30"
2	Rory Townsend (IRL)	Bolton Equities Black Spoke	+ 9"
3	Logan Currie (NZL)	Bolton Equities Black Spoke	+ 14"
4	Andreas Miltiadis (CYP)	Cyprus	+ 14"
5	Jakub Otruba (CZE)	ATT Investments	+ 15"
6	Daniel Turek (CZE)	ATT Investments	+ 18"
7	Bart Lemmen (NED)	Human Powered Health	+ 20"
8	Iúri Leitão (POR)	Caja Rural–Seguros RGA	+ 20"
9	Tom Sexton (NZL)	Bolton Equities Black Spoke	+ 21"
10	Stanisław Aniołkowski (POL)	Human Powered Health	+ 22"

=== Stage 1 ===
3 May 2023 — Heraklion to Heraklion, 187.7 km (116.6 mi)

Stage 1 Result
Rank	Rider	Team	Time
1	Stanisław Aniołkowski (POL)	Human Powered Health	4h 35' 29"
2	Iúri Leitão (POR)	Caja Rural–Seguros RGA	+ 0"
3	Tyler Stites (USA)	United States	+ 0"
4	Lorenzo Quartucci (ITA)	Team Corratec–Selle Italia	+ 0"
5	Matthew King (GBR)	X-Speed United	+ 0"
6	Timothy Dupont (BEL)	Tarteletto–Isorex	+ 0"
7	Enrico Zanoncello (ITA)	Green Project–Bardiani–CSF–Faizanè	+ 0"
8	Louis Blouwe (BEL)	Bingoal WB	+ 0"
9	Jesper Rasch (NED)	ABLOC CT	+ 0"
10	Sean Christian (USA)	United States	+ 0"

General classification after Stage 1
Rank	Rider	Team	Time
1	Aaron Gate (NZL)	Bolton Equities Black Spoke	4h 42' 59"
2	Rory Townsend (IRL)	Bolton Equities Black Spoke	+ 9"
3	Stanisław Aniołkowski (POL)	Human Powered Health	+ 12"
4	Logan Currie (NZL)	Bolton Equities Black Spoke	+ 14"
5	Iúri Leitão (POR)	Caja Rural–Seguros RGA	+ 14"
6	Andreas Miltiadis (CYP)	Cyprus	+ 14"
7	Jakub Otruba (CZE)	ATT Investments	+ 14"
8	Daniel Turek (CZE)	ATT Investments	+ 18"
9	Tyler Stites (USA)	United States	+ 19"
10	Robert Scott (GBR)	Cross Team Legendre	+ 25"

=== Stage 2 ===
4 May 2023 — Mycenae to Kalamata, 170.3 km (105.8 mi)

Stage 2 Result
Rank	Rider	Team	Time
1	Timothy Dupont (BEL)	Tarteletto–Isorex	3h 54' 20"
2	Enrico Zanoncello (ITA)	Green Project–Bardiani–CSF–Faizanè	+ 0"
3	Iúri Leitão (POR)	Caja Rural–Seguros RGA	+ 0"
4	Stanisław Aniołkowski (POL)	Human Powered Health	+ 0"
5	Mihkel Räim (EST)	ATT Investments	+ 0"
6	Rory Townsend (IRL)	Bolton Equities Black Spoke	+ 0"
7	Nathan Vandepitte (FRA)	Bingoal WB	+ 0"
8	Nikiforos Arvanitou (GRE)	Sofer–Savini Due–OMZ	+ 0"
9	Pirmin Eisenbarth (GER)	Bike Aid	+ 0"
10	Brody McDonald (USA)	United States	+ 0"

General classification after Stage 2
Rank	Rider	Team	Time
1	Aaron Gate (NZL)	Bolton Equities Black Spoke	8h 37' 19"
2	Rory Townsend (IRL)	Bolton Equities Black Spoke	+ 9"
3	Iúri Leitão (POR)	Caja Rural–Seguros RGA	+ 10"
4	Stanisław Aniołkowski (POL)	Human Powered Health	+ 12"
5	Jakub Otruba (CZE)	ATT Investments	+ 12"
6	Logan Currie (NZL)	Bolton Equities Black Spoke	+ 14"
7	Andreas Miltiadis (CYP)	Cyprus	+ 14"
8	Daniel Turek (CZE)	ATT Investments	+ 18"
9	Tyler Stites (USA)	United States	+ 19"
10	Timothy Dupont (BEL)	Tarteletto–Isorex	+ 25"

=== Stage 3 ===
5 May 2023 — Costa Navarino to Kyparissia, 153 km (95 mi)

Stage 3 Result
Rank	Rider	Team	Time
1	Iúri Leitão (POR)	Caja Rural–Seguros RGA	3h 31' 26"
2	Timothy Dupont (BEL)	Tarteletto–Isorex	+ 0"
3	Rory Townsend (IRL)	Bolton Equities Black Spoke	+ 9"
4	Brody McDonald (USA)	United States	+ 0"
5	Jim Brown (GBR)	Cross Team Legendre	+ 0"
6	Eduard-Michael Grosu (ROU)	HRE Mazowsze Serce Polski	+ 0"
7	Enrico Zanoncello (ITA)	Green Project–Bardiani–CSF–Faizanè	+ 0"
8	Stanisław Aniołkowski (POL)	Human Powered Health	+ 0"
9	Robert Scott (GBR)	Cross Team Legendre	+ 0"
10	Lorenzo Conforti (ITA)	Green Project–Bardiani–CSF–Faizanè	+ 0"

General classification after Stage 3
Rank	Rider	Team	Time
1	Iúri Leitão (POR)	Caja Rural–Seguros RGA	12h 08' 44"
2	Aaron Gate (NZL)	Bolton Equities Black Spoke	+ 1"
3	Rory Townsend (IRL)	Bolton Equities Black Spoke	+ 6"
4	Stanisław Aniołkowski (POL)	Human Powered Health	+ 13"
5	Jakub Otruba (CZE)	ATT Investments	+ 13"
6	Logan Currie (NZL)	Bolton Equities Black Spoke	+ 15"
7	Andreas Miltiadis (CYP)	Cyprus	+ 15"
8	Daniel Turek (CZE)	ATT Investments	+ 16"
9	Timothy Dupont (BEL)	Tarteletto–Isorex	+ 20"
10	Tyler Stites (USA)	United States	+ 20"

=== Stage 4 ===
6 May 2023 — Costa Navarino to Ancient Olympia, 133.5 km (83.0 mi)

Stage 4 Result
Rank	Rider	Team	Time
1	Stanisław Aniołkowski (POL)	Human Powered Health	2h 56' 20"
2	Iúri Leitão (POR)	Caja Rural–Seguros RGA	+ 0"
3	Pirmin Eisenbarth (GER)	Bike Aid	+ 0"
4	Giacomo Ballabio (ITA)	Global 6 Cycling	+ 0"
5	Samuele Zambelli (ITA)	Team Corratec–Selle Italia	+ 0"
6	Timothy Dupont (BEL)	Tarteletto–Isorex	+ 0"
7	Youcef Reguigui (ALG)	Terengganu Polygon Cycling Team	+ 0"
8	Rory Townsend (IRL)	Bolton Equities Black Spoke	+ 0"
9	Nathan Vandepitte (FRA)	Bingoal WB	+ 0"
10	Tyler Stites (USA)	United States	+ 0"

General classification after Stage 4
Rank	Rider	Team	Time
1	Iúri Leitão (POR)	Caja Rural–Seguros RGA	15h 04' 58"
2	Aaron Gate (NZL)	Bolton Equities Black Spoke	+ 6"
3	Stanisław Aniołkowski (POL)	Human Powered Health	+ 9"
4	Rory Townsend (IRL)	Bolton Equities Black Spoke	+ 12"
5	Jakub Otruba (CZE)	ATT Investments	+ 19"
6	Andreas Miltiadis (CYP)	Cyprus	+ 19"
7	Logan Currie (NZL)	Bolton Equities Black Spoke	+ 21"
8	Daniel Turek (CZE)	ATT Investments	+ 22"
9	Tyler Stites (USA)	United States	+ 23"
10	Timothy Dupont (BEL)	Tarteletto–Isorex	+ 26"

== Classification leadership table ==
Classification leadership by stage
Stage	Winner	General classification	Points classification	Mountains classification	Young rider classification	Team classification
P	Aaron Gate	Aaron Gate	not awarded	not awarded	Logan Currie	Bolton Equities Black Spoke
1	Stanisław Aniołkowski	Aaron Gate	Rémi Lelandais	Tomasz Budziński	Logan Currie	Bolton Equities Black Spoke
2	Timothy Dupont	Aaron Gate	Rémi Lelandais	Jakub Otruba	Logan Currie	Bolton Equities Black Spoke
3	Iúri Leitão	Iúri Leitão	Iúri Leitão	Andreas Miltiadis	Logan Currie	Bolton Equities Black Spoke
4	Stanisław Aniołkowski	Iúri Leitão	Iúri Leitão	Andreas Miltiadis	Logan Currie	Bolton Equities Black Spoke
Final		Iúri Leitão	Iúri Leitão	Andreas Miltiadis	Logan Currie	Bolton Equities Black Spoke

== Final standings ==
Legend
General classification	Denotes the winner of the general classification	Mountain classification	Denotes the winner of the mountains classification
Points classification	Denotes the winner of the points classification	Young rider classification	Denotes the winner of the Young rider classification
