= Mitri =

Mitri is a surname. Notable people with this name include:

== Surname ==
- Elie Mitri (born 1980), Lebanese actor, writer and stand-up comedian
- James Mitri (born 1999), New Zealand cyclist
- Leonardo De Mitri (1914–1956), Italian film director and screenwriter
- Tarek Mitri (born 1950), Lebanese professor
- Tiberio Mitri (1926–2001), Italian boxer

== Given name ==
- Mitri Raheb, Palestinian pastor
- Mitri al-Murr (1880–1969), Lebanese deacon, composer and scholar
