= 2019 Tour of Britain =

2019 UCI Europe Tour
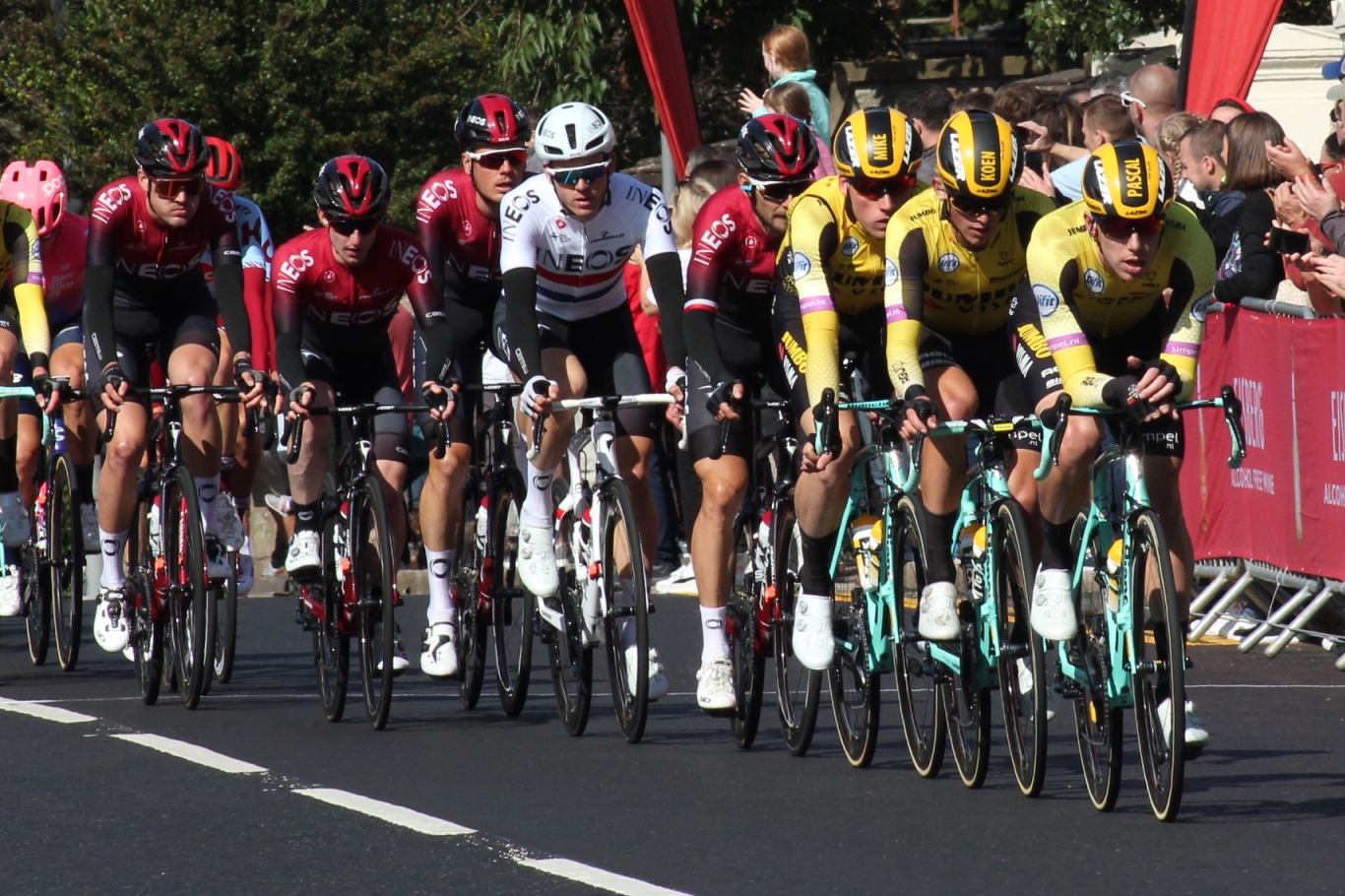
- Passing through Kilmarnock on stage one

Race details
- Dates: 7–14 September 2019
- Stages: 8
- Distance: 1,250 km (780 mi)
- Winning time: 29h 47' 41"

Results
Jersey awarded to the overall winner	Winner	Mathieu van der Poel (NED)	(Corendon–Circus)
	Second	Matteo Trentin (ITA)	(Mitchelton–Scott)
	Third	Jasper De Buyst (BEL)	(Lotto–Soudal)
Jersey awarded to the points classification winner	Points	Matteo Trentin (ITA)	(Mitchelton–Scott)
Jersey awarded to the mountains classification winner	Mountains	Jacob Scott (GBR)	(Swift Carbon Pro Cycling)
Jersey awarded to the sprints classification winner	Sprints	Rory Townsend (IRL)	(Canyon dhb p/b Bloor Homes)
	Team	Team INEOS	

The 2019 Ovo Energy Tour of Britain was an eight-stage men's professional road cycling race. It was the sixteenth running of the modern version of the Tour of Britain and the 79th British tour in total. The race started on 7 September 2019 in Glasgow and finished on 14 September 2019 in Manchester. It is part of the 2019 UCI Europe Tour.

== Teams ==
A total of 20 teams raced in the 2019 Tour of Britain: 10 UCI WorldTeams, 5 UCI Professional Continental teams, 4 UCI Continental Teams, and a British national team. Each team started with six riders for a starting peloton of 120 riders, of which 106 finished the race.

UCI WorldTeams

- AG2R La Mondiale
- EF Education First
- Lotto–Soudal
- Mitchelton–Scott
- Movistar Team
- Team Dimension Data
- Team INEOS
- Team Jumbo–Visma
- Team Katusha–Alpecin
- Team Sunweb

UCI Professional Continental Teams

- Corendon–Circus
- Israel Cycling Academy
- Riwal Readynez
- Sport Vlaanderen–Baloise
- Wanty–Gobert

UCI Continental Teams

- Canyon dhb p/b Bloor Homes
- Madison Genesis
- Swift Carbon Pro Cycling
- Team Wiggins Le Col

National Teams

- Great Britain

== Route ==
Stage characteristics
Stage	Date	Course	Distance	Type	Winner
1	7 September	George Square, Glasgow to Kirkcudbright	201.5 km (125.2 mi)	Hilly stage	Dylan Groenewegen (NED)
2	8 September	Kelso to Kelso	166.4 km (103.4 mi)	Hilly stage	Matteo Trentin (ITA)
3	9 September	Berwick-upon-Tweed to Newcastle-upon-Tyne	182.2 km (113.2 mi)	Flat stage	Dylan Groenewegen (NED)
4	10 September	Gateshead to Kendal	171.5 km (106.6 mi)	Mountain stage	Mathieu van der Poel (NED)
5	11 September	Birkenhead Park to Birkenhead Park	174 km (108.1 mi)	Flat stage	Dylan Groenewegen (NED)
6	12 September	Pershore to Pershore	14.5 km (9.0 mi)	Individual time trial	Edoardo Affini (ITA)
7	13 September	Warwick to Burton Dassett Country Park	186.5 km (115.9 mi)	Hilly stage	Mathieu van der Poel (NED)
8	14 September	Altrincham to Deansgate, Manchester	165 km (102.5 mi)	Hilly stage	Mathieu van der Poel (NED)
Total			1,250 km (776.7 mi)		

== Stages ==
=== Stage 1 ===
7 September 2019 — Glasgow to Kirkcudbright, 201.5 km (125 mi)

Stage 1 result
Rank	Rider	Team	Time
1	Dylan Groenewegen (NED)	Team Jumbo–Visma	4h 39' 49"
2	Davide Cimolai (ITA)	Israel Cycling Academy	+ 0"
3	Matteo Trentin (ITA)	Mitchelton–Scott	+ 0"
4	Mathieu van der Poel (NED)	Corendon–Circus	+ 0"
5	Ben Swift (GBR)	Team INEOS	+ 0"
6	Boris Vallée (BEL)	Wanty–Gobert	+ 0"
7	Trond Trondsen (NOR)	Wanty–Gobert	+ 0"
8	Jasper De Buyst (BEL)	Lotto–Soudal	+ 0"
9	Matthew Bostock (GBR)	Canyon dhb p/b Bloor Homes	+ 0"
10	Sacha Modolo (ITA)	EF Education First	+ 0"

General classification after stage 1
Rank	Rider	Team	Time
1	Dylan Groenewegen (NED)	Team Jumbo–Visma	4h 39' 39"
2	Rory Townsend (IRL)	Canyon dhb p/b Bloor Homes	+ 3"
3	Davide Cimolai (ITA)	Israel Cycling Academy	+ 4"
4	Gediminas Bagdonas (LTU)	AG2R La Mondiale	+ 4"
5	Dries De Bondt (BEL)	Corendon–Circus	+ 5"
6	Matteo Trentin (ITA)	Mitchelton–Scott	+ 6"
7	Mathieu van der Poel (NED)	Corendon–Circus	+ 10"
8	Ben Swift (GBR)	Team INEOS	+ 10"
9	Boris Vallée (BEL)	Wanty–Gobert	+ 10"
10	Trond Trondsen (NOR)	Wanty–Gobert	+ 10"

=== Stage 2 ===
8 September 2019 — Kelso to Kelso, 166.4 km (103 mi)

Stage 2 result
Rank	Rider	Team	Time
1	Matteo Trentin (ITA)	Mitchelton–Scott	3h 55' 53"
2	Jasper De Buyst (BEL)	Lotto–Soudal	+ 0"
3	Mike Teunissen (NED)	Team Jumbo–Visma	+ 0"
4	Davide Cimolai (ITA)	Israel Cycling Academy	+ 0"
5	Alex Edmondson (AUS)	Mitchelton–Scott	+ 0"
6	Ben Swift (GBR)	Team INEOS	+ 0"
7	Alex Dowsett (GBR)	Team Katusha–Alpecin	+ 0"
8	Simon Clarke (AUS)	EF Education First	+ 0"
9	Tom Van Asbroeck (BEL)	Israel Cycling Academy	+ 0"
10	Danilo Wyss (SUI)	Team Dimension Data	+ 0"

General classification after stage 2
Rank	Rider	Team	Time
1	Matteo Trentin (ITA)	Mitchelton–Scott	8h 35' 25"
2	Davide Cimolai (ITA)	Israel Cycling Academy	+ 11"
3	Jasper De Buyst (BEL)	Lotto–Soudal	+ 11"
4	Mike Teunissen (NED)	Team Jumbo–Visma	+ 13"
5	Simon Clarke (AUS)	EF Education First	+ 16"
6	Ben Swift (GBR)	Team INEOS	+ 17"
7	Mathieu van der Poel (NED)	Corendon–Circus	+ 17"
8	Loïc Vliegen (BEL)	Wanty–Gobert	+ 17"
9	Tom Van Asbroeck (BEL)	Israel Cycling Academy	+ 17"
10	Alex Edmondson (AUS)	Mitchelton–Scott	+ 17"

=== Stage 3 ===
9 September 2019 — Berwick-upon-Tweed to Newcastle-upon-Tyne, 182.2 km (113 mi)

Stage 3 result
Rank	Rider	Team	Time
1	Dylan Groenewegen (NED)	Team Jumbo–Visma	4h 37' 53"
2	Mathieu van der Poel (NED)	Corendon–Circus	+ 0"
3	Davide Cimolai (ITA)	Israel Cycling Academy	+ 0"
4	Mike Teunissen (NED)	Team Jumbo–Visma	+ 0"
5	Matteo Trentin (ITA)	Mitchelton–Scott	+ 0"
6	Amund Grøndahl Jansen (NOR)	Team Jumbo–Visma	+ 0"
7	Matthew Walls (GBR)	Great Britain	+ 0"
8	Alex Edmondson (AUS)	Mitchelton–Scott	+ 0"
9	Nils Eekhoff (NED)	Team Sunweb	+ 0"
10	Danilo Wyss (SUI)	Team Dimension Data	+ 0"

General classification after stage 3
Rank	Rider	Team	Time
1	Matteo Trentin (ITA)	Mitchelton–Scott	13h 13' 18"
2	Davide Cimolai (ITA)	Israel Cycling Academy	+ 7"
3	Mathieu van der Poel (NED)	Corendon–Circus	+ 11"
4	Jasper De Buyst (BEL)	Lotto–Soudal	+ 11"
5	Mike Teunissen (NED)	Team Jumbo–Visma	+ 13"
6	Simon Clarke (AUS)	EF Education First	+ 16"
7	Ben Swift (GBR)	Team INEOS	+ 17"
8	Loïc Vliegen (BEL)	Wanty–Gobert	+ 17"
9	Alex Edmondson (AUS)	Mitchelton–Scott	+ 17"
10	Danilo Wyss (SUI)	Team Dimension Data	+ 17"

=== Stage 4 ===
10 September 2019 — Gateshead to Kendal, 171.5 km (107 mi)

Stage 4 result
Rank	Rider	Team	Time
1	Mathieu van der Poel (NED)	Corendon–Circus	4h 23' 08"
2	Jasper De Buyst (BEL)	Lotto–Soudal	+ 3"
3	Simon Clarke (AUS)	EF Education First	+ 3"
4	Ben Swift (GBR)	Team INEOS	+ 3"
5	Amund Grøndahl Jansen (NOR)	Team Jumbo–Visma	+ 3"
6	Tom Van Asbroeck (BEL)	Israel Cycling Academy	+ 3"
7	Xandro Meurisse (BEL)	Wanty–Gobert	+ 3"
8	Ben Hermans (BEL)	Israel Cycling Academy	+ 3"
9	Matteo Trentin (ITA)	Mitchelton–Scott	+ 3"
10	Tiesj Benoot (BEL)	Lotto–Soudal	+ 3"

General classification after stage 4
Rank	Rider	Team	Time
1	Mathieu van der Poel (NED)	Corendon–Circus	17h 36' 27"
2	Matteo Trentin (ITA)	Mitchelton–Scott	+ 1"
3	Jasper De Buyst (BEL)	Lotto–Soudal	+ 7"
4	Simon Clarke (AUS)	EF Education First	+ 14"
5	Mike Teunissen (NED)	Team Jumbo–Visma	+ 15"
6	Ben Swift (GBR)	Team INEOS	+ 19"
7	Amund Grøndahl Jansen (NOR)	Team Jumbo–Visma	+ 19"
8	Thomas Sprengers (BEL)	Sport Vlaanderen–Baloise	+ 19"
9	Nils Politt (GER)	Team Katusha–Alpecin	+ 19"
10	Andrey Amador (CRC)	Movistar Team	+ 19"

=== Stage 5 ===
11 September 2019 — Birkenhead Park to Birkenhead Park, 174 km (108 mi)

Stage 5 result
Rank	Rider	Team	Time
1	Dylan Groenewegen (NED)	Team Jumbo–Visma	3h 57' 31"
2	Matthew Walls (GBR)	Great Britain	+ 0"
3	Matteo Trentin (ITA)	Mitchelton–Scott	+ 0"
4	Cees Bol (NED)	Team Sunweb	+ 0"
5	Davide Cimolai (ITA)	Israel Cycling Academy	+ 0"
6	Jasper De Buyst (BEL)	Lotto–Soudal	+ 0"
7	Ben Swift (GBR)	Team INEOS	+ 0"
8	Tom Van Asbroeck (BEL)	Israel Cycling Academy	+ 0"
9	Edoardo Affini (ITA)	Mitchelton–Scott	+ 0"
10	Mark Cavendish (GBR)	Team Dimension Data	+ 0"

General classification after stage 5
Rank	Rider	Team	Time
1	Matteo Trentin (ITA)	Mitchelton–Scott	21h 33' 55"
2	Mathieu van der Poel (NED)	Corendon–Circus	+ 3"
3	Jasper De Buyst (BEL)	Lotto–Soudal	+ 10"
4	Simon Clarke (AUS)	EF Education First	+ 17"
5	Mike Teunissen (NED)	Team Jumbo–Visma	+ 18"
6	Ben Swift (GBR)	Team INEOS	+ 22"
7	Andrey Amador (CRC)	Movistar Team	+ 22"
8	Amund Grøndahl Jansen (NOR)	Team Jumbo–Visma	+ 22"
9	Nils Politt (GER)	Team Katusha–Alpecin	+ 22"
10	Pavel Sivakov (RUS)	Team INEOS	+ 22"

=== Stage 6 ===
12 September 2019 — Pershore - Pershore, 14.5 km (9 mi), (ITT)

Stage 6 result
Rank	Rider	Team	Time
1	Edoardo Affini (ITA)	Mitchelton–Scott	16' 39"
2	Sebastian Langeveld (NED)	EF Education First	+ 7"
3	Dylan van Baarle (NED)	Team INEOS	+ 7"
4	Luke Durbridge (AUS)	Mitchelton–Scott	+ 8"
5	Tanel Kangert (EST)	EF Education First	+ 10"
6	Mathieu van der Poel (NED)	Corendon–Circus	+ 12"
7	Alex Dowsett (GBR)	Team Katusha–Alpecin	+ 13"
8	Jos van Emden (NED)	Team Jumbo–Visma	+ 16"
9	Pavel Sivakov (RUS)	Team INEOS	+ 17"
10	Frederik Frison (BEL)	Lotto–Soudal	+ 20"

General classification after stage 6
Rank	Rider	Team	Time
1	Mathieu van der Poel (NED)	Corendon–Circus	21h 50' 49"
2	Matteo Trentin (ITA)	Mitchelton–Scott	+ 6"
3	Pavel Sivakov (RUS)	Team INEOS	+ 24"
4	Jasper De Buyst (BEL)	Lotto–Soudal	+ 26"
5	Nils Politt (GER)	Team Katusha–Alpecin	+ 27"
6	Gianni Moscon (ITA)	Team INEOS	+ 33"
7	Mike Teunissen (NED)	Team Jumbo–Visma	+ 35"
8	Tanel Kangert (EST)	EF Education First	+ 36"
9	Andrey Amador (CRC)	Movistar Team	+ 39"
10	Amund Grøndahl Jansen (NOR)	Team Jumbo–Visma	+ 40"

=== Stage 7 ===
13 September 2019 — Warwick to Burton Dassett Country Park, 186.5 km (116 mi)

Stage 7 result
Rank	Rider	Team	Time
1	Mathieu van der Poel (NED)	Corendon–Circus	4h 07' 49"
2	Matteo Trentin (ITA)	Mitchelton–Scott	+ 1"
3	Simon Clarke (AUS)	EF Education First	+ 3"
4	Davide Cimolai (ITA)	Israel Cycling Academy	+ 3"
5	Tiesj Benoot (BEL)	Lotto–Soudal	+ 3"
6	Jasper De Buyst (BEL)	Lotto–Soudal	+ 3"
7	Gianni Moscon (ITA)	Team INEOS	+ 5"
8	Xandro Meurisse (BEL)	Wanty–Gobert	+ 5"
9	Thomas Sprengers (BEL)	Sport Vlaanderen–Baloise	+ 5"
10	Amund Grøndahl Jansen (NOR)	Team Jumbo–Visma	+ 5"

General classification after stage 7
Rank	Rider	Team	Time
1	Mathieu van der Poel (NED)	Corendon–Circus	25h 58' 25"
2	Matteo Trentin (ITA)	Mitchelton–Scott	+ 12"
3	Jasper De Buyst (BEL)	Lotto–Soudal	+ 40"
4	Pavel Sivakov (RUS)	Team INEOS	+ 42"
5	Nils Politt (GER)	Team Katusha–Alpecin	+ 51"
6	Gianni Moscon (ITA)	Team INEOS	+ 51"
7	Mike Teunissen (NED)	Team Jumbo–Visma	+ 53"
8	Andrey Amador (CRC)	Movistar Team	+ 57"
9	Tiesj Benoot (BEL)	Lotto–Soudal	+ 57"
10	Amund Grøndahl Jansen (NOR)	Team Jumbo–Visma	+ 58"

=== Stage 8 ===
14 September 2019 — Altrincham to Deansgate, Manchester, 165 km (103 mi)

Stage 8 result
Rank	Rider	Team	Time
1	Mathieu van der Poel (NED)	Corendon–Circus	3h 49' 26"
2	Cees Bol (NED)	Team Sunweb	+ 0"
3	Matteo Trentin (ITA)	Mitchelton–Scott	+ 0"
4	Mike Teunissen (NED)	Team Jumbo–Visma	+ 0"
5	Davide Cimolai (ITA)	Israel Cycling Academy	+ 0"
6	Sacha Modolo (ITA)	EF Education First	+ 0"
7	Nils Eekhoff (NED)	Team Sunweb	+ 0"
8	Jasper De Buyst (BEL)	Lotto–Soudal	+ 0"
9	Xandro Meurisse (BEL)	Wanty–Gobert	+ 0"
10	Danilo Wyss (SUI)	Team Dimension Data	+ 0"

Final general classification
Rank	Rider	Team	Time
1	Mathieu van der Poel (NED)	Corendon–Circus	29h 47' 41"
2	Matteo Trentin (ITA)	Mitchelton–Scott	+ 17"
3	Jasper De Buyst (BEL)	Lotto–Soudal	+ 50"
4	Pavel Sivakov (RUS)	Team INEOS	+ 52"
5	Nils Politt (GER)	Team Katusha–Alpecin	+ 1' 01"
6	Gianni Moscon (ITA)	Team INEOS	+ 1' 01"
7	Mike Teunissen (NED)	Team Jumbo–Visma	+ 1' 03"
8	Andrey Amador (CRC)	Movistar Team	+ 1' 07"
9	Tiesj Benoot (BEL)	Lotto–Soudal	+ 1' 07"
10	Amund Grøndahl Jansen (NOR)	Team Jumbo–Visma	+ 1' 08"

== Classification leadership ==
Classification leadership by stage
Stage	Winner	General classification	Points classification	Mountains classification	Sprints classification	Team classification	Combativity award
1	Dylan Groenewegen	Dylan Groenewegen	Dylan Groenewegen	Jacob Scott	Rory Townsend	Wanty–Gobert	Rory Townsend
2	Matteo Trentin	Matteo Trentin	Matteo Trentin	Jacob Scott	Gediminas Bagdonas	Team INEOS	Peter Williams
3	Dylan Groenewegen	Matteo Trentin	Matteo Trentin	Jacob Scott	Rory Townsend	Team INEOS	Harry Tanfield
4	Mathieu van der Poel	Mathieu van der Poel	Matteo Trentin	Jacob Scott	Rory Townsend	Team INEOS	Dylan van Baarle
5	Dylan Groenewegen	Matteo Trentin	Matteo Trentin	Jacob Scott	Rory Townsend	Team INEOS	Jacob Scott
6	Edoardo Affini	Mathieu van der Poel	Matteo Trentin	Jacob Scott	Rory Townsend	Team INEOS	no award
7	Mathieu van der Poel	Mathieu van der Poel	Matteo Trentin	Jacob Scott	Rory Townsend	Team INEOS	Mathieu van der Poel
8	Mathieu van der Poel	Mathieu van der Poel	Matteo Trentin	Jacob Scott	Rory Townsend	Team INEOS	Pavel Sivakov
Final		Mathieu van der Poel	Matteo Trentin	Jacob Scott	Rory Townsend	Team INEOS	Dylan van Baarle

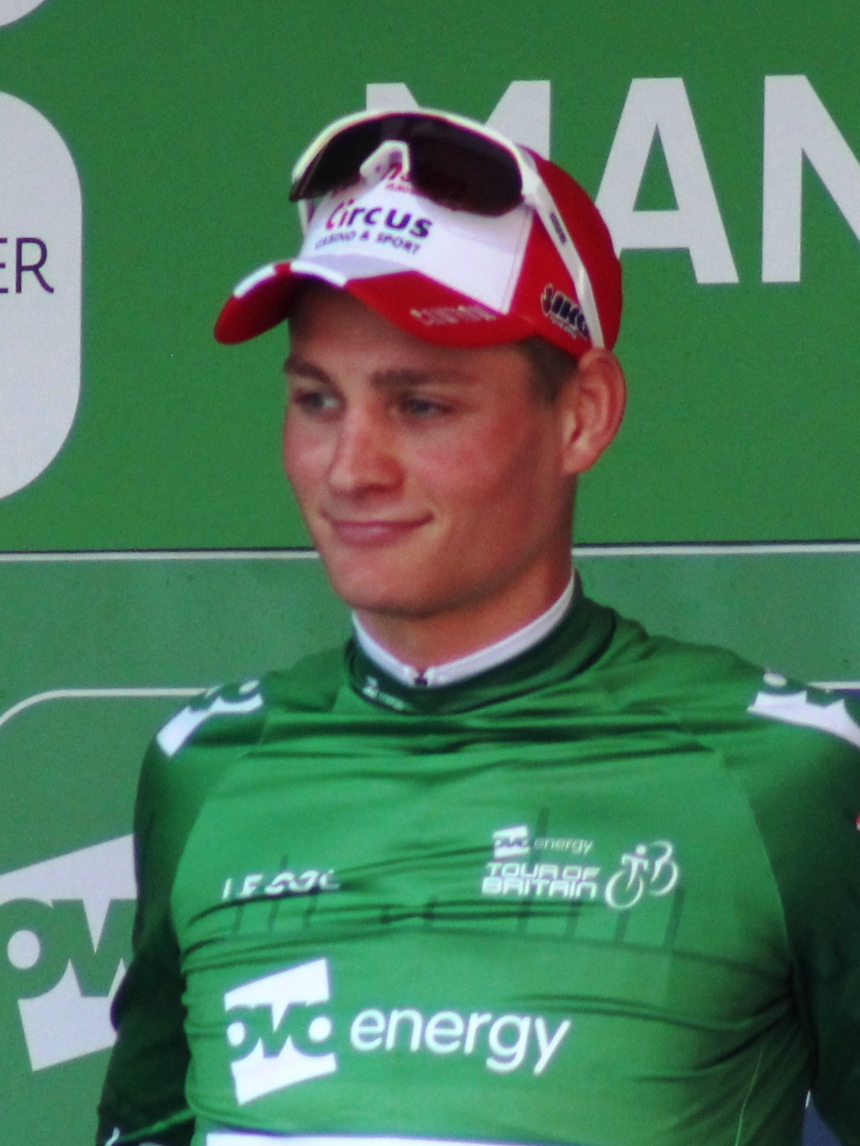
Mathieu van der Poel
Overall winner

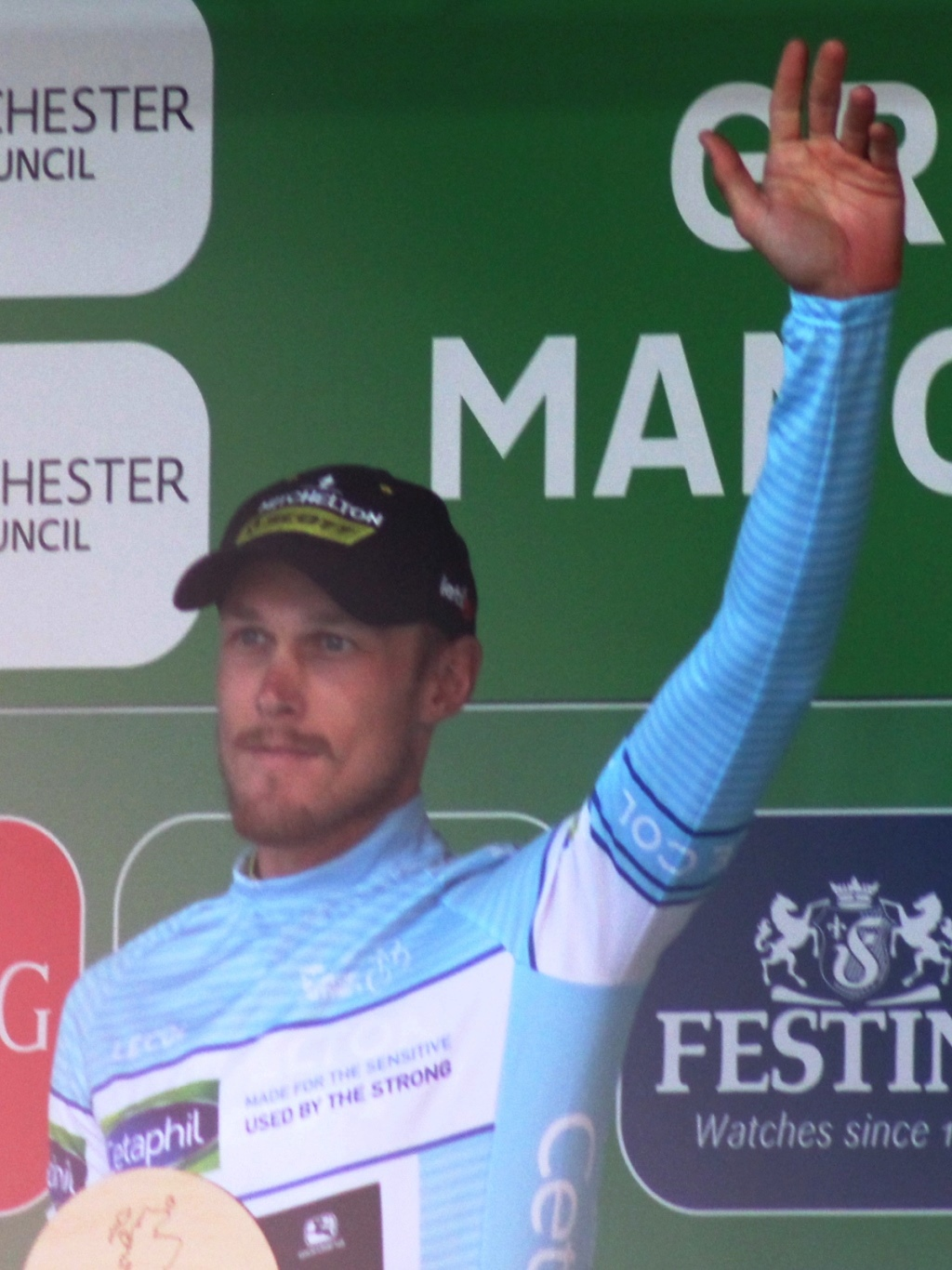
Matteo Trentin
Points classification

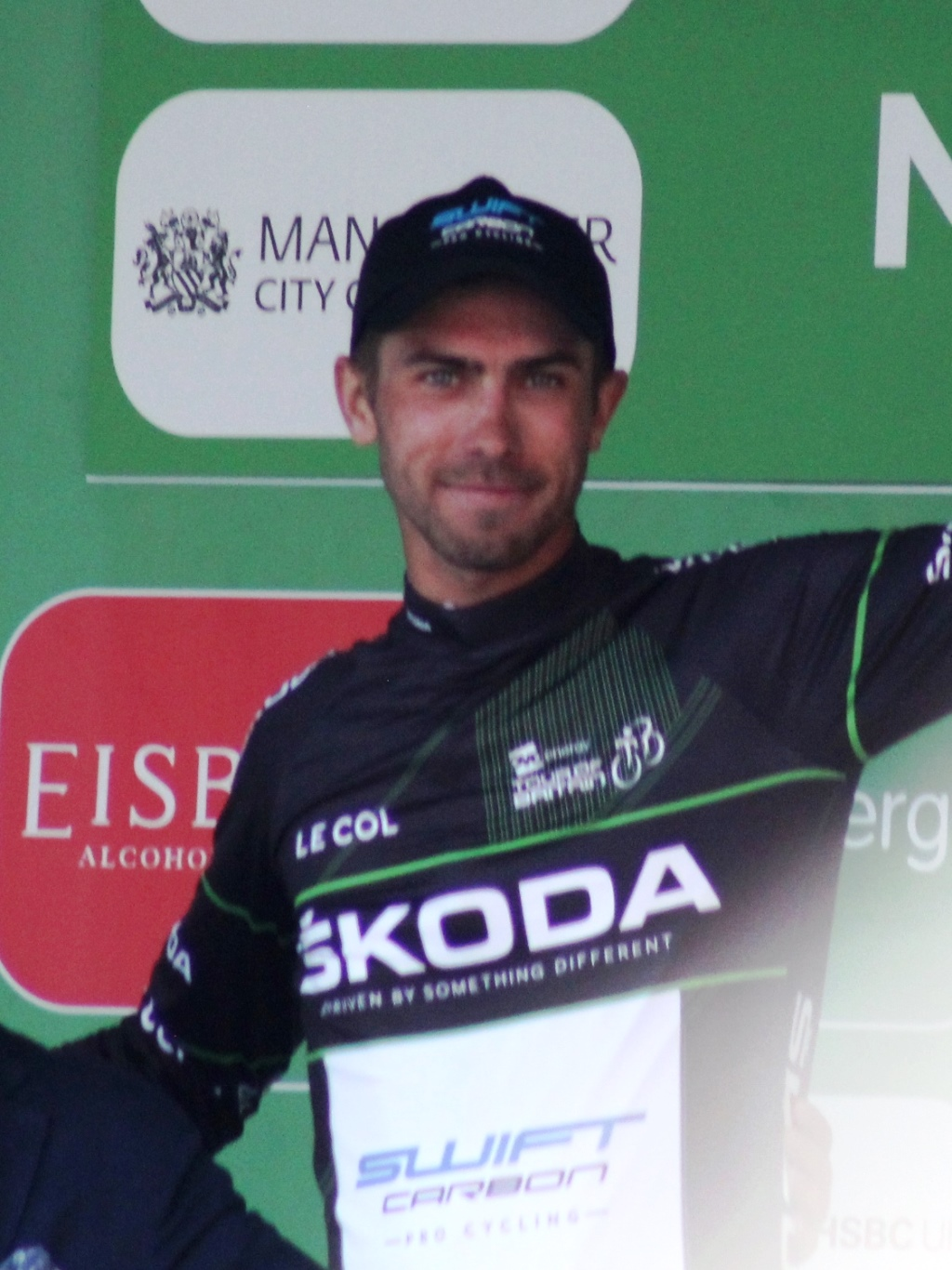
Jacob Scott
King of the mountains

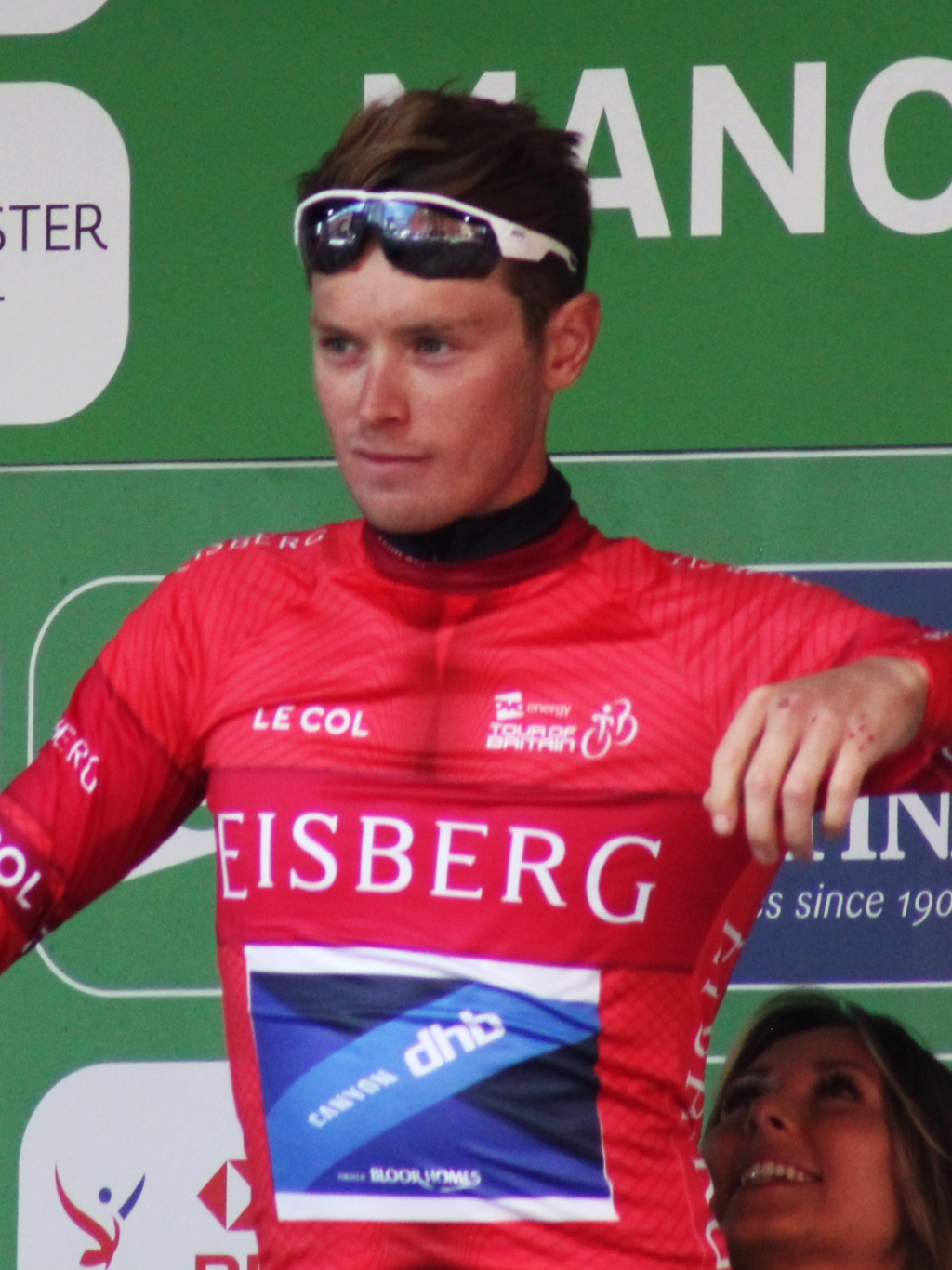
Rory Townsend
Sprints classification

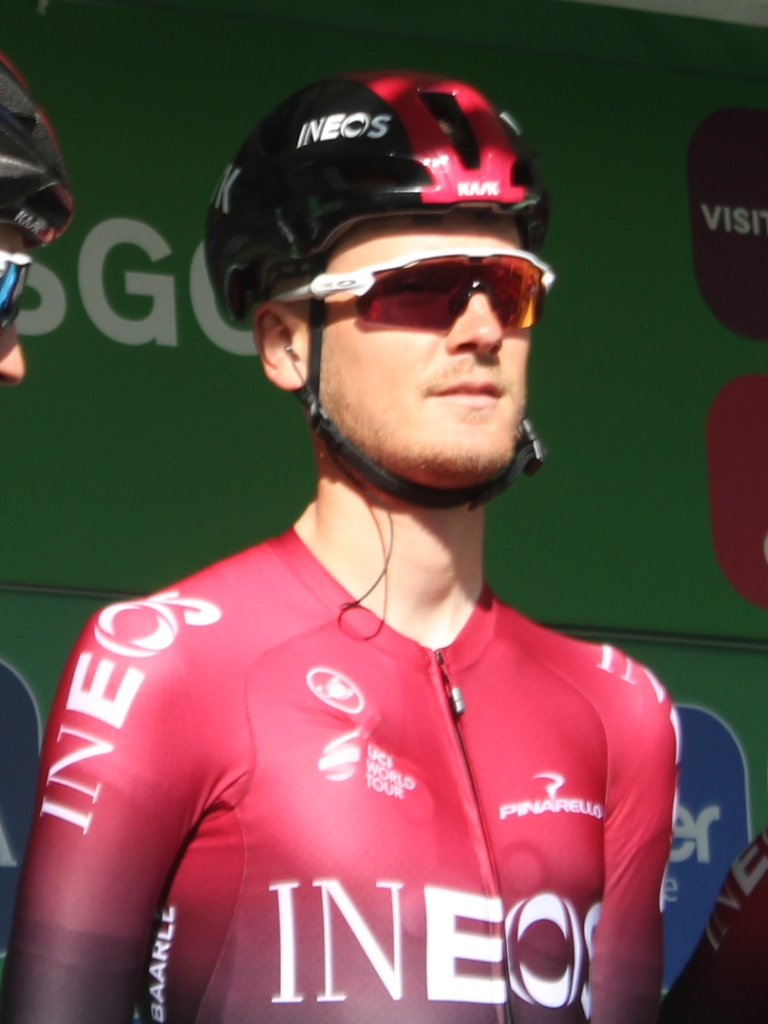
Dylan van Baarle
Combativity

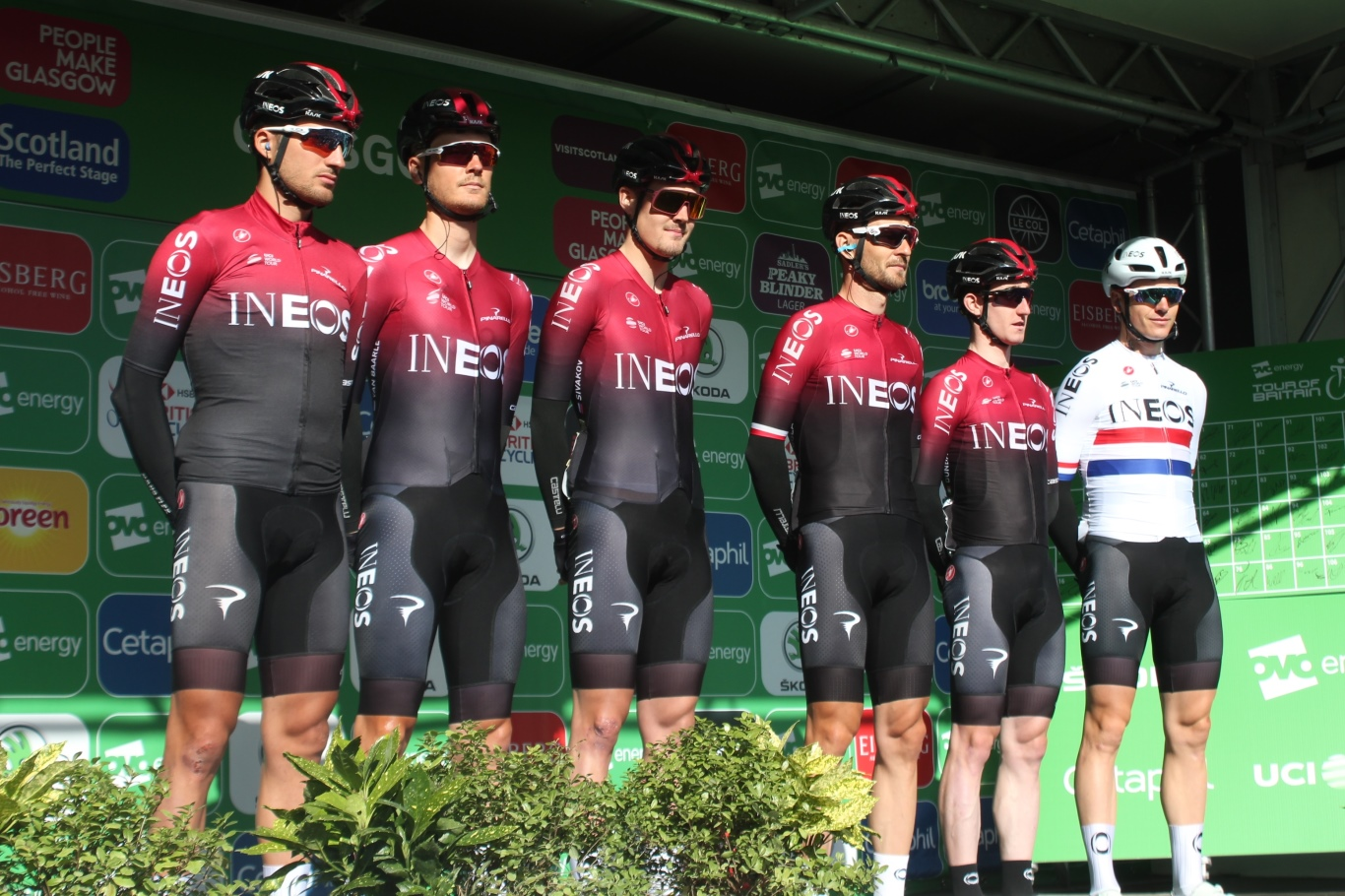
Team INEOS

== Classification standings ==
Legend
Denotes the leader of the general classification
Denotes the leader of the points classification
Denotes the leader of the mountains classification
Denotes the leader of the sprints classification
Denotes the leader of the team classification

=== General classification ===
Final general classification (1-10)
Rank	Rider	Team	Time
1	Mathieu van der Poel (NED)	Corendon–Circus	29h 47' 41"
2	Matteo Trentin (ITA)	Mitchelton–Scott	+ 17"
3	Jasper De Buyst (BEL)	Lotto–Soudal	+ 50"
4	Pavel Sivakov (RUS)	Team INEOS	+ 52"
5	Nils Politt (GER)	Team Katusha–Alpecin	+ 1' 01"
6	Gianni Moscon (ITA)	Team INEOS	+ 1' 01"
7	Mike Teunissen (NED)	Team Jumbo–Visma	+ 1' 03"
8	Andrey Amador (CRC)	Movistar Team	+ 1' 07"
9	Tiesj Benoot (BEL)	Lotto–Soudal	+ 1' 07"
10	Amund Grøndahl Jansen (NOR)	Team Jumbo–Visma	+ 1' 08"

=== Points classification ===
Final points classification (1–10)
Rank	Rider	Team	Points
1	Matteo Trentin (ITA)	Mitchelton–Scott	86
2	Mathieu van der Poel (NED)	Corendon–Circus	73
3	Davide Cimolai (ITA)	Israel Cycling Academy	73
4	Jasper De Buyst (BEL)	Lotto–Soudal	64
5	Dylan Groenewegen (NED)	Team Jumbo–Visma	45
6	Ben Swift (GBR)	Team INEOS	44
7	Mike Teunissen (NED)	Team Jumbo–Visma	42
8	Simon Clarke (AUS)	EF Education First	38
9	Matthew Walls (GBR)	Great Britain	28
10	Amund Grøndahl Jansen (NOR)	Team Jumbo–Visma	27

=== Mountains classification ===
Final mountains classification (1–10)
Rank	Rider	Team	Points
1	Jacob Scott (GBR)	Swift Carbon Pro Cycling	59
2	Dries De Bondt (BEL)	Corendon–Circus	35
3	Dylan van Baarle (NED)	Team INEOS	34
4	Cameron Meyer (AUS)	Mitchelton–Scott	22
5	Eddie Dunbar (IRL)	Team INEOS	21
6	Pavel Sivakov (RUS)	Team INEOS	18
7	Emil Vinjebo (DEN)	Riwal Readynez	18
8	Mathieu van der Poel (NED)	Corendon–Circus	15
9	Gediminas Bagdonas (LTU)	AG2R La Mondiale	15
10	Axel Domont (FRA)	AG2R La Mondiale	14

=== Sprints classification ===
Final sprints classification (1–10)
Rank	Rider	Team	Points
1	Rory Townsend (IRL)	Canyon dhb p/b Bloor Homes	17
2	Dries De Bondt (BEL)	Corendon–Circus	15
3	Dylan van Baarle (NED)	Team INEOS	14
4	Gediminas Bagdonas (LTU)	AG2R La Mondiale	13
5	Matthew Bostock (GBR)	Canyon dhb p/b Bloor Homes	9
6	Matteo Trentin (ITA)	Mitchelton–Scott	7
7	Matthew Holmes (GBR)	Madison Genesis	6
8	Emil Vinjebo (DEN)	Riwal Readynez	6
9	Cameron Meyer (AUS)	Mitchelton–Scott	5
10	Axel Domont (FRA)	AG2R La Mondiale	4

=== Teams classification ===
Final team classification (1–10)
Rank	Team	Time
1	Team INEOS	89h 25' 56"
2	Lotto–Soudal	+ 1' 45"
3	Mitchelton–Scott	+ 3' 14"
4	Movistar Team	+ 5' 26"
5	AG2R La Mondiale	+ 8' 00"
6	EF Education First	+ 9' 41"
7	Israel Cycling Academy	+ 13' 17"
8	Riwal Readynez	+ 15' 48"
9	Corendon–Circus	+ 16' 22"
10	Team Sunweb	+ 17' 02"
