= Jacob Scott =

British cyclist

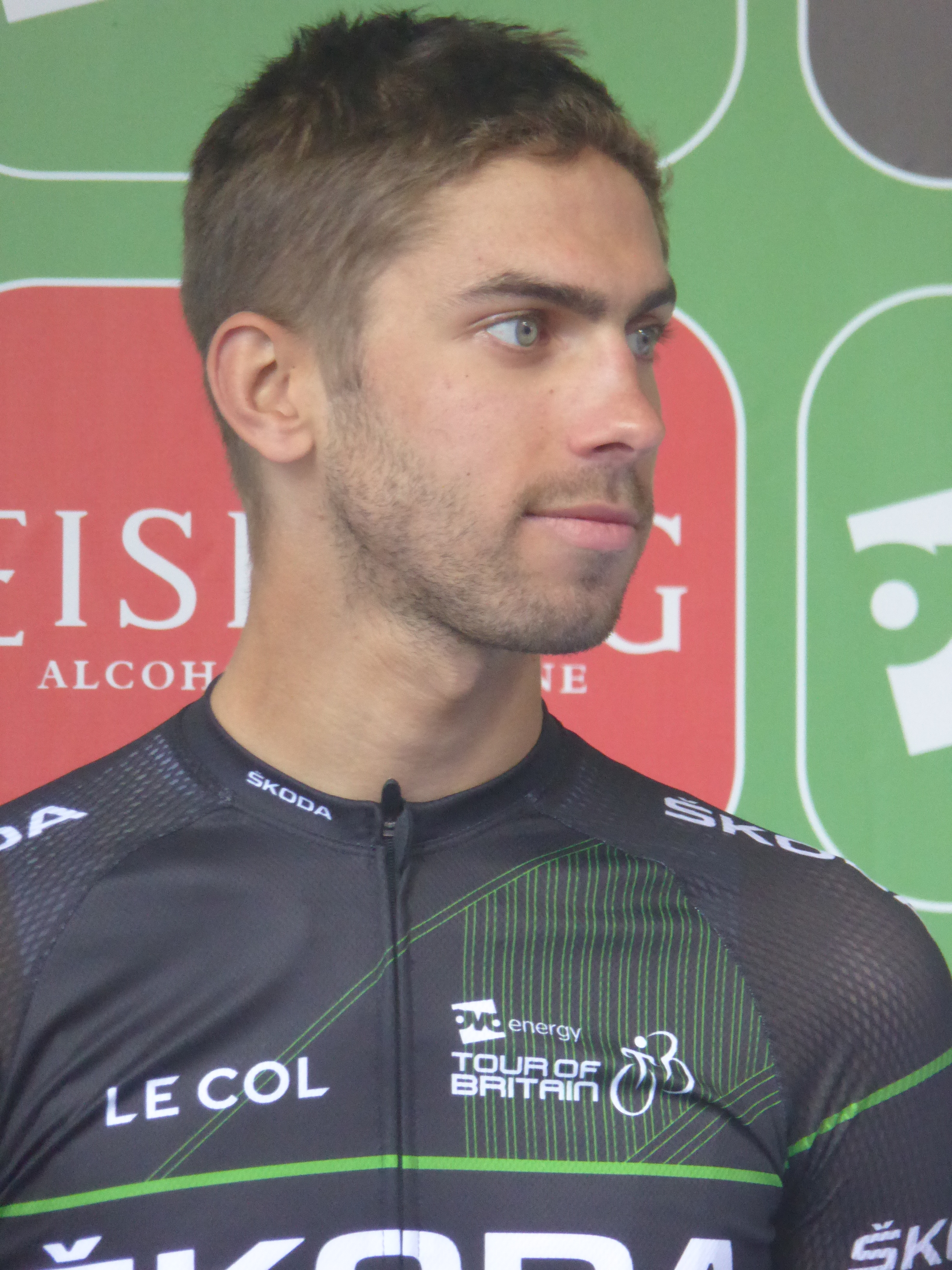
- Scott at the 2019 Tour of Britain

Personal information
- Full name: Jacob Alan Scott
- Born: 14 June 1995 (age 31) Oldham, England
- Height: 1.82 m (6 ft 0 in)
- Weight: 68 kg (150 lb)

Cycling career
- Sport: Cycling
- Discipline: Road
- Role: Rider

Amateur teams
- 2014: Haribo–Beacon
- 2015: Illi Bikes

Professional teams
- 2016–2017: An Post–Chain Reaction
- 2018: ONE Pro Cycling
- 2019: SwiftCarbon Pro Cycling
- 2020–2022: Canyon dhb p/b Soreen
- 2023: Bolton Equities Black Spoke
- 2024: Rembe Pro Cycling Team Sauerland

Jacob Alan Scott (born 14 June 1995) is a British cyclist, who most recently rode for UCI Continental team Rembe Pro Cycling Team Sauerland. During his career, Scott has won the mountains classification at the Tour of Britain in 2019 and 2021, and he was the winner of the cross-country marathon at the 2021 British National Mountain Biking Championships.

== Major results ==
2013
1st Points classification, Junior Tour of Wales
8th Overall Sint-Martinusprijs Kontich

1st Stage 1

9th Tour of Flanders Juniors
2017
5th Antwerpse Havenpijl
6th Ronde van Overijssel
2019
1st Mountains classification, Tour of Britain
4th Rutland–Melton CiCLE Classic
2021
1st Marathon, National Mountain Biking Championships
Tour of Britain

1st Mountains classification
1st Sprints classification

2022
1st Stockton GP
1st Barnsley, National Circuit Series
3rd Rutland–Melton CiCLE Classic
7th Tour of Leuven
8th Midden–Brabant Poort Omloop
2023
6th Rutland–Melton CiCLE Classic
10th Famenne Ardenne Classic
