= 2025 Hamburg Cyclassics =

Cycling race

2025 ADAC Cyclassics
2025 UCI World Tour, race 29 of 36

Race details
- Dates: 17 August 2025
- Stages: 1
- Distance: 207.4 km (128.9 mi)
- Winning time: 4h 24' 06"

Results
	Winner	Rory Townsend (IRL)	(Q36.5 Pro Cycling Team)
	Second	Arnaud De Lie (BEL)	(Lotto)
	Third	Paul Magnier (FRA)	(Soudal–Quick-Step)

The 2025 Hamburg Cyclassics, known for sponsorship reasons as the ADAC Cyclassics, was a road cycling one-day race that took place on 17 August 2025 in Germany. It was the 28th edition of EuroEyes Cyclassics and the 29th event of the 2025 UCI World Tour.

== Teams ==
All eighteen UCI WorldTeams and five UCI ProTeams made up the twenty-three teams that participated in the race.

UCI WorldTeams

- Alpecin–Deceuninck
- Arkéa–B&B Hotels
- XDS Astana Team
- Cofidis
- Decathlon–AG2R La Mondiale
- EF Education–EasyPost
- Groupama–FDJ
- INEOS Grenadiers
- Intermarché–Wanty
- Lidl–Trek
- Movistar Team
- Red Bull–Bora–Hansgrohe
- Soudal–Quick-Step
- Team Bahrain Victorious
- Team Picnic–PostNL
- Team Jayco–AlUla
- UAE Team Emirates XRG
- Visma–Lease a Bike

UCI ProTeams

- Israel–Premier Tech
- Lotto
- Q36.5 Pro Cycling Team
- Tudor Pro Cycling Team
- Uno-X Mobility

== Result ==
Result
Rank	Rider	Team	Time
1	Rory Townsend (IRL)	Q36.5 Pro Cycling Team	4h 24' 06"
2	Arnaud De Lie (BEL)	Lotto	+ 0"
3	Paul Magnier (FRA)	Soudal–Quick-Step	+ 0"
4	Jasper Philipsen (BEL)	Alpecin–Deceuninck	+ 0"
5	Danny van Poppel (NED)	Intermarché–Wanty	+ 0"
6	Fred Wright (GBR)	Team Bahrain Victorious	+ 0"
7	António Morgado (POR)	UAE Team Emirates XRG	+ 0"
8	Biniam Girmay (ERI)	Intermarché–Wanty	+ 0"
9	Matis Louvel (FRA)	Israel–Premier Tech	+ 0"
10	Wout van Aert (BEL)	Visma–Lease a Bike	+ 0"
