= Tyler Stites =

American cyclist (born 1998)

Personal information
- Full name: Tyler Stites
- Born: March 18, 1998 (age 28) Tucson, Arizona, United States
- Height: 1.8 m (5 ft 11 in)
- Weight: 62 kg (137 lb)

Cycling career
- Sport: Cycling
- Current team: Modern Adventure Pro Cycling
- Discipline: Road
- Role: Rider

Amateur teams
- 2012–2016: El Grupo Youth Cycling Club
- 2022: Project Echelon Racing

Professional teams
- 2017–2021: Aevolo
- 2023–2024: Project Echelon Racing
- 2025: Caja Rural–Seguros RGA
- 2026–: Modern Adventure Pro Cycling

Tyler Stites (born March 18, 1998) is an American racing cyclist, who currently rides for UCI ProTeam Modern Adventure Pro Cycling.

== Major results ==
2016
1st Stage 2 Tour de l'Abitibi
2017
1st Prologue (TTT) Tour Alsace
2018
1st Prologue (TTT) Tour Alsace
10th Chrono Kristin Armstrong
2019
5th Overall Tour of the Gila
7th Overall Joe Martin Stage Race
2021
5th Overall Joe Martin Stage Race

1st Mountains classification
1st Stage 2

2022
1st Overall Redlands Bicycle Classic

1st Stage 3

1st Overall Valley of the Sun Stage Race

1st Stage 2

1st Overall Tucson Bicycle Classic

1st Stages 2 & 3

National Road Championships

2nd Road race
5th Time trial

3rd Overall Joe Martin Stage Race
10th Overall Tour of the Gila

1st Stages 2 & 4

2023
1st Overall Redlands Bicycle Classic

1st Mountains classification
1st Stage 3

1st Overall Tucson Bicycle Classic

1st Stage 1

2nd Overall Tour de Beauce

1st Points classification
1st Stage 4 & 5

3rd Road race, National Road Championships
3rd Overall Joe Martin Stage Race

1st Stage 1

3rd Overall Tour de Guadeloupe

1st Prologue

9th Overall International Tour of Hellas
2024
1st Overall Tour of the Gila

1st Stage 3

1st Overall Redlands Bicycle Classic

1st Stages 1 & 3

1st International Rhodes Grand Prix
1st Gastown Grand Prix
1st El Tour de Tucson
1st Stage 1 Tour de Beauce
2nd Time trial, National Road Championships
7th Overall International Tour of Rhodes
