= General classification in the Tour of Britain =

Cycling race results

- Sport: Road cycling
- Competition: Tour of Britain
- Awarded for: Winner overall classification

History
- First award: 2004
- Editions: 22 (as of 2026)
- First winner: Mauricio Ardila (COL)
- Most wins: Edvald Boasson Hagen (NOR); Lars Boom (NED); Wout van Aert (BEL) (2 wins)
- Most recent: Tim Wellens (BEL)

The General classification in the Tour of Britain is the most prestigious classification out of the four in the Tour of Britain, the one which is won by the overall winner. Historically the leader of this competition has worn a yellow jersey, but, from the 2011 edition due to sponsorship, it became known as the IG Markets Gold Jersey. In 2017, it became a green jersey in light of sponsorship from Ovo Energy.

== Rules ==
Like most cycling events the winner is determined by who has the fastest time over the entirety of the race. Time bonuses can be won by winning a stage, or reaching an intermediate sprint or the top of a climb first. The rider who has completed the course in the smallest time will win the Tour of Britain.

== Results ==
The winners, runners-up and third places were:

	1st	Team	2nd	Team	3rd	Team
2004	Mauricio Ardila (COL)	Vlaanderen–T Interim	Julian Dean (NZL)	Crédit Agricole	Nick Nuyens (BEL)	Quick-Step–Davitamon
2005	Nick Nuyens (BEL)	Quick-Step–Innergetic	Michael Blaudzun (DEN)	Team CSC	Javier Cherro Molina (ESP)	Comunidad Valenciana–Elche
2006	Martin Pedersen (DEN)	Team CSC	Luis Pasamontes (ESP)	Unibet.com	Filippo Pozzato (ITA)	Quick-Step–Innergetic
2007	Romain Feillu (FRA)	Agritubel	Adrián Palomares (ESP)	Fuerteventura–Canarias	Luke Roberts (AUS)	Team CSC
2008	Geoffroy Lequatre (FRA)	Agritubel	Steve Cummings (GBR)	Barloworld	Ian Stannard (GBR)	Great Britain
2009	Edvald Boasson Hagen (NOR)	Team Columbia–HTC	Christopher Sutton (AUS)	Garmin–Slipstream	Martin Reimer (GER)	Cervélo TestTeam
2010	Michael Albasini (SWI)	Team HTC–Columbia	Borut Božič (SLO)	Vacansoleil	Greg Henderson (NZL)	Team Sky
2011	Lars Boom (NED)	Rabobank	Steve Cummings (GBR)	Team Sky	Jan Bárta (CZE)	UnitedHealthcare
2012	Nathan Haas (AUS)	Garmin–Sharp	Damiano Caruso (ITA)	Liquigas–Cannondale	Leigh Howard (AUS)	Orica–GreenEDGE
2013	Bradley Wiggins (GBR)	Team Sky	Martin Elmiger (SUI)	IAM Cycling	Simon Yates (GBR)	Great Britain
2014	Dylan van Baarle (NED)	Garmin–Sharp	Michał Kwiatkowski (POL)	Omega Pharma–Quick-Step	Bradley Wiggins (GBR)	Team Sky
2015	Edvald Boasson Hagen (NOR)	MTN–Qhubeka	Wout Poels (NED)	Team Sky	Owain Doull (GBR)	WIGGINS
2016	Steve Cummings (GBR)	Team Dimension Data	Rohan Dennis (AUS)	BMC Racing Team	Tom Dumoulin (NED)	Team Giant–Alpecin
2017	Lars Boom (NED)	LottoNL–Jumbo	Edvald Boasson Hagen (NOR)	Team Dimension Data	Stefan Küng (SUI)	BMC Racing Team
2018	Julian Alaphilippe (FRA)	Quick-Step Floors	Wout Poels (NED)	Team Sky	Primož Roglič (SLO)	LottoNL–Jumbo
2019	Mathieu van der Poel (NED)	Corendon–Circus	Matteo Trentin (ITA)	Mitchelton–Scott	Jasper De Buyst (BEL)	Lotto–Soudal
2020	Cancelled due to the COVID-19 pandemic.					
2021	Wout van Aert (BEL)	Team Jumbo–Visma	Ethan Hayter (GBR)	INEOS Grenadiers	Julian Alaphilippe (FRA)	Deceuninck–Quick-Step
2022	Gonzalo Serrano (ESP)	Movistar Team	Tom Pidcock (GBR)	INEOS Grenadiers	Omar Fraile (ESP)	INEOS Grenadiers
2023	Wout van Aert (BEL)	Team Jumbo–Visma	Tobias Halland Johannessen (NOR)	Uno-X Pro Cycling Team	Damien Howson (AUS)	Q36.5 Pro Cycling Team
2024	Stephen Williams (GBR)	Israel–Premier Tech	Oscar Onley (GBR)	Team dsm–firmenich PostNL	Tom Donnenwirth (FRA)	Decathlon–AG2R La Mondiale Development Team
2025	Romain Grégoire (FRA)	Groupama–FDJ	Remco Evenepoel (BEL)	Soudal–Quick-Step	Julian Alaphilippe (FRA)	Tudor Pro Cycling Team
2026	Tim Wellens (BEL)	UAE Team Emirates XRG	Lewis Askey (GBR)	NSN Cycling Team	Jasper Stuyven (BEL)	Soudal–Quick-Step

== Wins by country ==
Wins	Nation
4	Netherlands
4	France
4	Belgium
3	United Kingdom
2	Norway
1	Australia
1	Colombia
1	Denmark
1	Spain
1	Switzerland

== Repeat winners ==
Wins	Rider	Editions
2	Edvald Boasson Hagen (NOR)	2009, 2015
2	Lars Boom (NED)	2011, 2017
2	Wout van Aert (BEL)	2021, 2023

== Sponsorship ==
Before the 2011 race, it was announced that the general classification would be sponsored by IG Markets, changing the race leaders jersey from the Yellow Jersey to the IG Markets Gold Jersey, in a competition jersey shake-up which changed the design of all four jerseys in the event.
