= Mitri al-Murr =

Lebanese Deacon, composer and scholar

Mitrī al-Murr (Arabic: متري المر; Greek: Μίτρι Ελ Μούρ; also Mitri El Murr; 7 November 1880 – 31 August 1969) was a Lebanese deacon, composer, scholar and the Archon Protopsaltis (first cantor) of the Greek Orthodox Church of Antioch, from 1912 until his death. He was born in Tripoli.

He is known for his sophisticated compositions of Orthodox Church music.
