= Sherford (new town) =

Town under construction in Devon, England

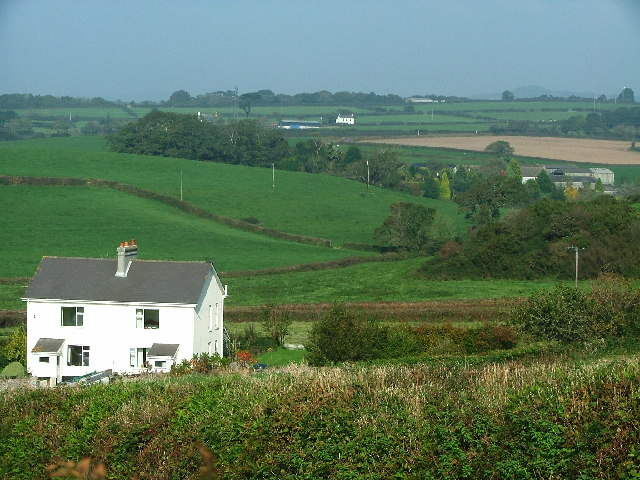
- View of the Sherford valley
- OS grid reference: SX554535
- District: South Hams and Plymouth
- Shire county: Devon
- Region: South West
- Country: England
- Sovereign state: United Kingdom
- Post town: Plymouth
- Postcode district: PL9
- Dialling code: 01752
- Police: Devon and Cornwall
- Fire: Devon and Somerset
- Ambulance: South Western
- UK Parliament: South West Devon
- Website: http://sherford.uk

Sherford is a new town under construction in Devon, England. Part of the land for development lies within Plymouth and the rest within South Hams.

Development on the site was originally due to start in 2007, and its first 300 dwellings were to be built in 2009. In August 2015, the construction of the new town started on the first 700 homes after South Hams council accepted a new planning application in December 2011; formal planning permission was granted on 12 November 2013.

Homes are being built by a number of developers including Taylor Wimpey, Linden Homes and Bovis Homes, with progress now managed by specialist development managers Brookbanks.

The project is part-funded by a £32 million repayable government loan. A new swimming pool will also be built in the town, which will be the closest pool to the residents of Plymstock. It will include three primary schools, one secondary school, a library, a youth centre, a health centre and a new town centre with retail. The first of the primary schools, Sherford Vale Primary School, opened in September 2018.

In total, the new town is expected to create 7000 new jobs. The development will reportedly provide 35 hectares (350,000 m^{2}) of publicly accessible green space and communal areas, which includes Sherford Stream Valley, urban parks, playgrounds, wildflower meadows, avenues of trees, and parkland which will eventually span 500 acres (200 hectares).

Once completed, it is expected to have 5,500 dwellings built over the period of 20 years. Over 1000 of the houses will be "low cost", due to the large discrepancy between house prices and wages in the area. The town planning will use traditional urbanisation to make the town carbon neutral by constructing energy-efficient buildings and laying out the town so that people live close to a main street. The aim is that shops, schools and businesses will be within walking distance of residents' homes. Whilst excavating the site, an ancient settlement was discovered, believed to be over 3000 years old.

== Design ==
The new urban town has been planned since 2008 in a Postmodern picturesque style otherwise known as New Classical architecture Barton Wilmore according to New Urbanism principles established at sites such as Poundbury in Dorset. It features four main quarters arranged around "Local Centres (Mixed Use)" (none complete as of 2024), four new schools and a business district adjacent to the A38 linked by winding tree-lined "Main Streets" which carry the principal vehicular access and bus routes connecting the Devon Expressway to the village suburb of Elburton and lacking provision for separated cycleways. Secondary Streets form quarters with eclectic architecture in a historicising pastiche of Georgian architecture carried out in red brick and modern stucco, with modern sash windows and false balconies referencing Regency architecture. Completely lacking formal precedent in the vernacular architecture of the local area, they are infilled with commercial architecture in a contrasting modern style featuring planar glazing. The urban quarters are separated from one another by areas of green space incorporating elements of the preexisting farms and woodland in an attempt to create permeability for the wildlife displaced by the development. Large areas of publicly accessible "country park" buffer the site against its southern boundary adjoining the edge of Elburton, including cycle routes and sustainable urban drainage systems and biodiversity measures.

== History ==
The town is being constructed in and around the places called Higher, East and West Sherford. A manor of Sireford / Sirefort was recorded in the Domesday Book of 1086. The part of the town within South Hams district, as of 2023, continues to form part of the civil parish of Brixton.

In February 2022, archaeologists led by Rob Bourn, managing director of Orion Heritage, announced the discovery of the remains of a woolly mammoth, reindeer, rhinoceros, bison, wolf and hyena in a cave system near the town. Over 200 clusters of bones have been removed by the explorers to analyse life in Ice Age Britain. Remains of a tusk, a molar tooth, other bones of a wooly mammoth, a partial skull and mandible of a woolly rhinoceros date to the middle of the last Ice Age between 60,000 and 30,000 years ago.

Wessex archaeology, working in the business district, announced the discovery of a hitherto unknown ancient, presumed Roman road in early 2023. Constructed of crushed slate with drainage channels, it appears to cross the entire site through a landscape of square enclosed Romano-British farmsteads. This is a nationally significant find which, along with other recent finds, is redefining the extent of Roman influence in Devon and Cornwall.

== See also ==
- Sherford (near Kingsbridge) – a village with the same name, also in South Hams, Devon
