= James Mitri =

British-born New Zealand cyclist

Personal information
- Full name: James Adriano Mitri
- Born: 28 February 1999 (age 27) London, England
- Height: 1.80 m (5 ft 11 in)
- Weight: 60 kg (132 lb)

Cycling career
- Sport: Cycling
- Current team: Global 6 United
- Discipline: Road
- Role: Rider
- Rider type: Climber; Domestique

Amateur teams
- 2017: JLT Condor junior
- 2017: Cartagena–Esetec

Professional teams
- 2018–2019: Burgos BH
- 2020: Vini Zabù–KTM
- 2021– 2022: Global 6 Cycling

Major wins
- Vuelta Pamplona GC 2017

James Adriano Mitri (born 28 February 1999 in London) is a British-born New Zealand professional cyclist who started his racing career in the UK with HMT JLT Condor winning the general classification in the 2017 Vuelta Pamplona in Spain before going to the pro tour category professionals in 2018 and representing New Zealand at the 2018 World Championships in Innsbruck Austria and racing in prestigious events such as Milan San Remo and Il Lombardia. He is predominantly a climber and puncheur.

James currently owns and founded UCI Continental team Global 6 United. Launched in the 2021 racing season with a New Zealand licence the team has participated in world class events such as the Tour of Britain, Tour of Taiwan and Tour of Turkiye.

The team has seen considerable success throughout the years signing riders from the pro circuits as well aa identifying young talents and achieving notable podiums in prestigious events such as The Presidential cycling Tour of Turkiye and Fleche du sud.
