= Nathan Vandepitte =

French cyclist

Personal information
- Born: 30 March 2000 (age 26) Tielt, Belgium
- Height: 1.92 m (6 ft 4 in)
- Weight: 80 kg (176 lb)

Cycling career
- Sport: Cycling
- Current team: Océane Top 16
- Discipline: Road
- Role: Rider

Amateur teams
- 2016: BTWIN U19 Racing Team
- 2017–2018: Culture Vélo Look Racing Team U19
- 2017: CT Spider King–EFC–L&R–Trek
- 2018: CT Soenens–Boom
- 2020: Occitane CF
- 2025–: Océane Top 16

Professional teams
- 2019: Wallonie–Bruxelles Development Team
- 2021–2022: Bingoal WB Development Team
- 2023–2024: Bingoal WB

Nathan Vandepitte (born 30 March 2000) is a French cyclist, who currently rides for club team Océane Top 16.

== Major results ==
2017
5th Chrono des Nations Juniors
2018
1st Stage 1 Tour des Portes du Pays d'Othe
5th Chrono des Nations Juniors
2021
3rd Omloop Het Nieuwsblad Beloften
9th Kampioenschap van Vlaanderen
2022
1st Stage 2 Province Cycling Tour
10th Youngster Coast Challenge
