= Rory Townsend =

Irish cyclist

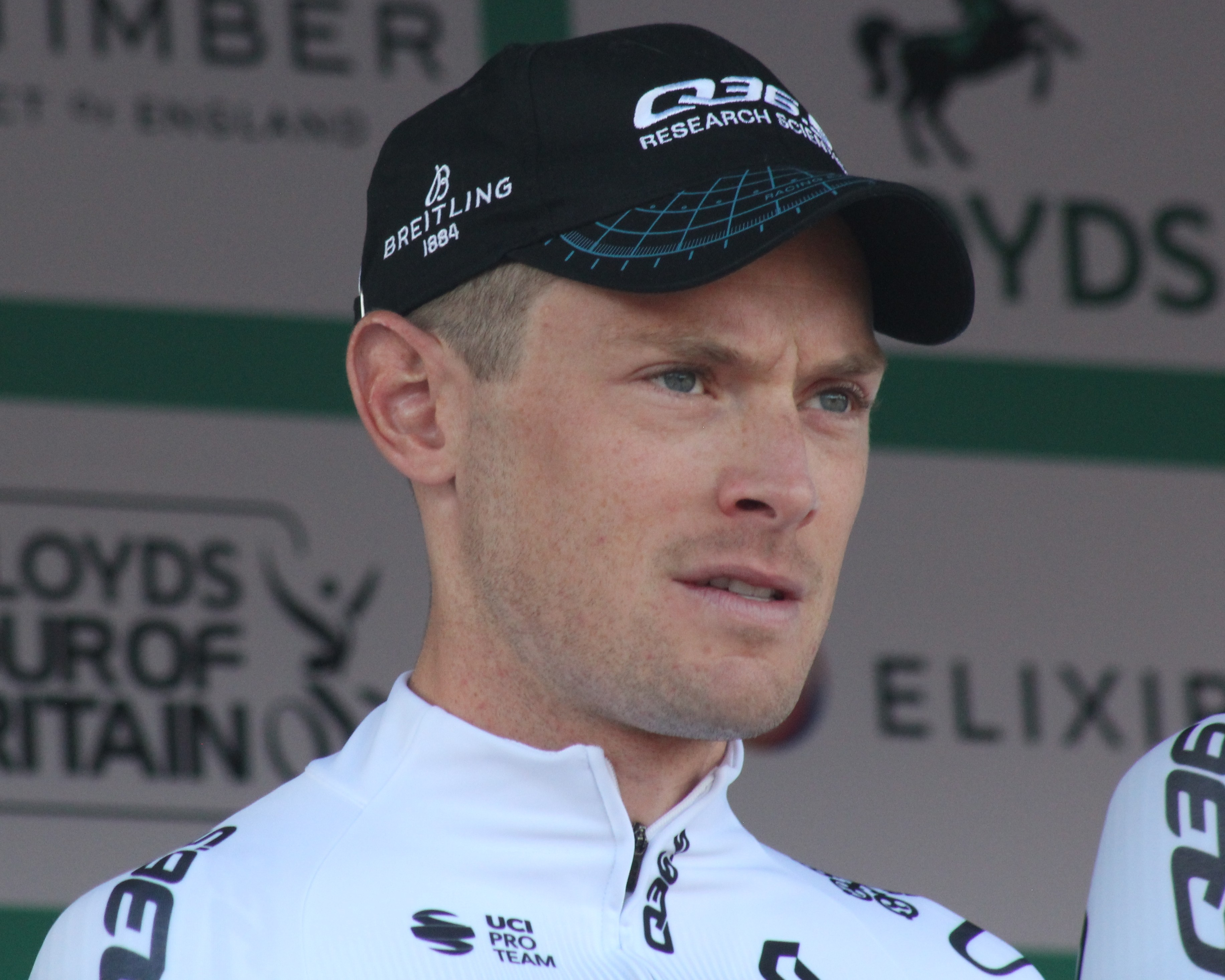
- Townsend at the 2025 Tour of Britain

Personal information
- Full name: Rory Patrick Townsend
- Born: 30 June 1995 (age 31) Kingston-upon-Thames, England
- Height: 1.84 m (6 ft 0 in)
- Weight: 73 kg (161 lb)

Cycling career
- Sport: Cycling
- Current team: Unibet Rose Rockets
- Discipline: Road
- Role: Rider

Professional teams
- 2016: Pedal Heaven
- 2017–2022: Bike Channel–Canyon
- 2023: Bolton Equities Black Spoke
- 2024–2025: Q36.5 Pro Cycling Team
- 2026–: Unibet Rose Rockets

Major wins
- One-day races and Classics National Road Race Championships (2022, 2025) Hamburg Cyclassics (2025)

Rory Patrick Townsend (born 30 June 1995) is an Irish cyclist, who currently rides for UCI ProTeam Unibet Rose Rockets.

== Major results ==
2017
1st Mountains classification, Tour of Almaty
1st Points classification, Tour of Quanzhou Bay
2nd Midden–Brabant Poort Omloop
4th Rutland–Melton CiCLE Classic
9th Rad am Ring
2018
8th Antwerpse Havenpijl
2019 (2 pro wins)
1st Sprints classification, Tour of Britain
1st Beaumont Trophy
1st East Cleveland–Klondike GP
1st Circuit of the Mendips
Tour of Fuzhou

1st Stages 2 & 4

1st Brooklands, Tour Series
2nd Memorial Philippe Van Coningsloo
3rd Classic Loire Atlantique
3rd Heistse Pijl
3rd Rutland–Melton CiCLE Classic
4th Road race, National Road Championships
2021
Tour de la Mirabelle

1st Points classification
1st Stage 1

9th Clàssica Comunitat Valenciana 1969
9th Heistse Pijl
10th Ronde van Limburg
2022 (1)
1st Road race, National Road Championships
1st Omloop Mandel-Leie-Schelde
6th Arno Wallaard Memorial
2023 (1)
1st La Roue Tourangelle
2nd Road race, National Road Championships
4th Overall International Tour of Hellas
5th Druivenkoers Overijse
5th Rutland–Melton CiCLE Classic
5th Grand Prix Cerami
6th Circuit de Wallonie
2024
3rd Road race, National Road Championships
4th La Roue Tourangelle
6th Elfstedenrace
8th Paris–Chauny
9th Paris–Camembert
2025 (2)
National Road Championships

1st Road race
4th Time trial

1st Hamburg Cyclassics
6th Overall Boucles de la Mayenne
7th Kampioenschap van Vlaanderen
