= Alex Peters =

British cyclist (born 1994)

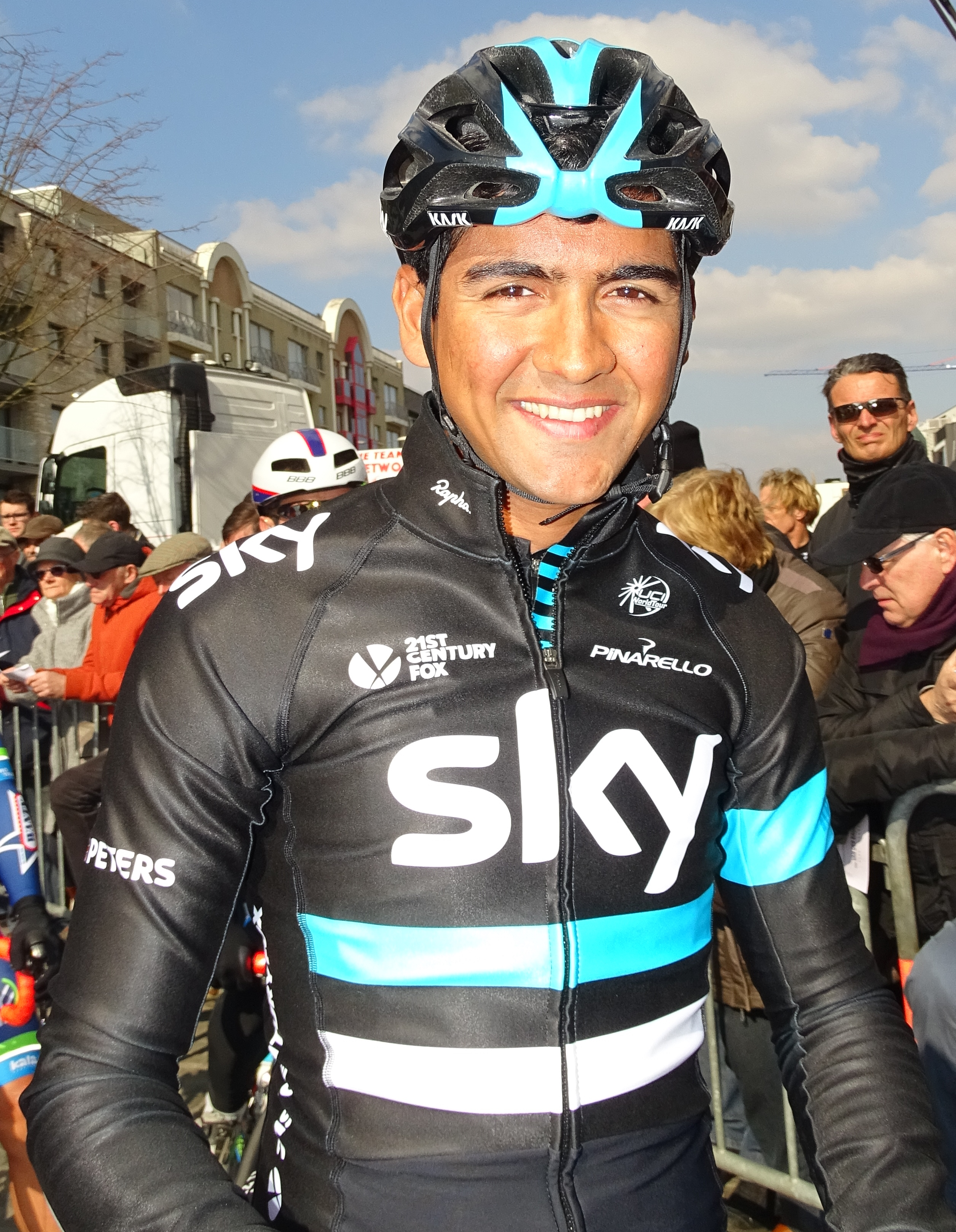
- Peters at the 2016 Nokere Koerse.

Personal information
- Full name: Alex James Peters
- Born: 31 March 1994 (age 32) Hackney, London, United Kingdom

Cycling career
- Sport: Cycling
- Current team: SwiftCarbon Pro Cycling
- Discipline: Road
- Role: Rider

Amateur teams
- 2006: Lee Valley Youth Cycling Club
- 2009–2011: Cycling Club Hackney
- 2012: Mosquito Bikes

Professional teams
- 2013–2014: Madison Genesis
- 2015: SEG Racing
- 2015: Team Sky (stagiaire)
- 2016: Team Sky
- 2017: SEG Racing Academy
- 2020: Canyon dhb p/b Soreen
- 2021: SwiftCarbon Pro Cycling
- 2022: Ribble Weldtite

Alex James Peters (born 31 March 1994) is an English cyclist, who last rode for UCI Continental team Ribble Weldtite. Peters previously rode professionally between 2013 and 2017 for the Madison Genesis, Team Sky and SEG Racing Academy teams.

== Career ==
In 2014, whilst riding for Madison Genesis, he came second overall in the Rás Tailteann stage race.

In July 2015 it was announced that he would join Team Sky as a stagiaire for the rest of 2015, becoming a fully fledged team member on 1 January 2016. In January 2017 it was announced that Peters and Team Sky had reached an agreement for him to leave the team and return to SEG Racing Academy for the 2017 season, due to struggling with personal issues.

Peters returned to cycling joining the British team SwiftCarbon Pro Cycling in 2021.

== Personal life ==
Peters resides in East London.

== Major results ==
2011
4th Road race, National Junior Road Championships
2012
1st Overall National Junior Road Series
1st Stage 1 (ITT) Junior Tour of Wales
2014
1st Overall Tour of the Reservoir

1st Stage 1

2nd Overall Rás Tailteann

1st Young rider classification

2015
2nd Overall Tour de Normandie

1st Young rider classification

7th Overall Tour de Bretagne

1st Stage 4

9th Flèche Ardennaise
2016
6th Japan Cup
2021
1st Ryedale Grand Prix
2023
5th Timmy James Memorial Grand Prix
