= Global 6 United =

New Zealand cycling team

Team information
- UCI code: GLC
- Registered: Luxembourg
- Founded: 2021
- Discipline: Road
- Status: UCI Continental

Key personnel
- General manager: Gilles Kockelmann

Team name history
- 2021–2023; 2024: Global 6 Cycling; Global 6 United

Global 6 United was a Luxembourgish and previously New Zealand UCI Continental cycling team focusing on road bicycle racing.

The team was founded by James Mitri with the aim of uniting riders from the six continents.

For the 2024 season the team was licensed in Luxembourg. After the season the team disbanded.

== Team roster ==
As of 31 December 2024.

Rider	Date of birth
Giacomo Ballabio (ITA)	10 January 1998 (age 28)
Edouard Bonnefoix (FRA)	9 December 1998 (age 27)
Ivan Centrone (LUX)	17 September 1995 (age 30)
David Gabrick (USA)	14 May 2003 (age 23)
James Jobber (GBR)	9 January 1994 (age 32)
Iver Knotten (NOR)	17 December 1998 (age 27)
Wesley Mol (NED)	25 February 1999 (age 27)
Ronan O'Connor (IRL)	10 September 2003 (age 22)
Callum Ormiston (RSA)	2 August 2000 (age 26)
Rafael Pereira Marques (LUX)	31 August 2001 (age 25)

== Major wins ==
2023
Stage 1 Flèche du Sud, Giacomo Ballabio
