= SwiftCarbon Pro Cycling =

British cycling team

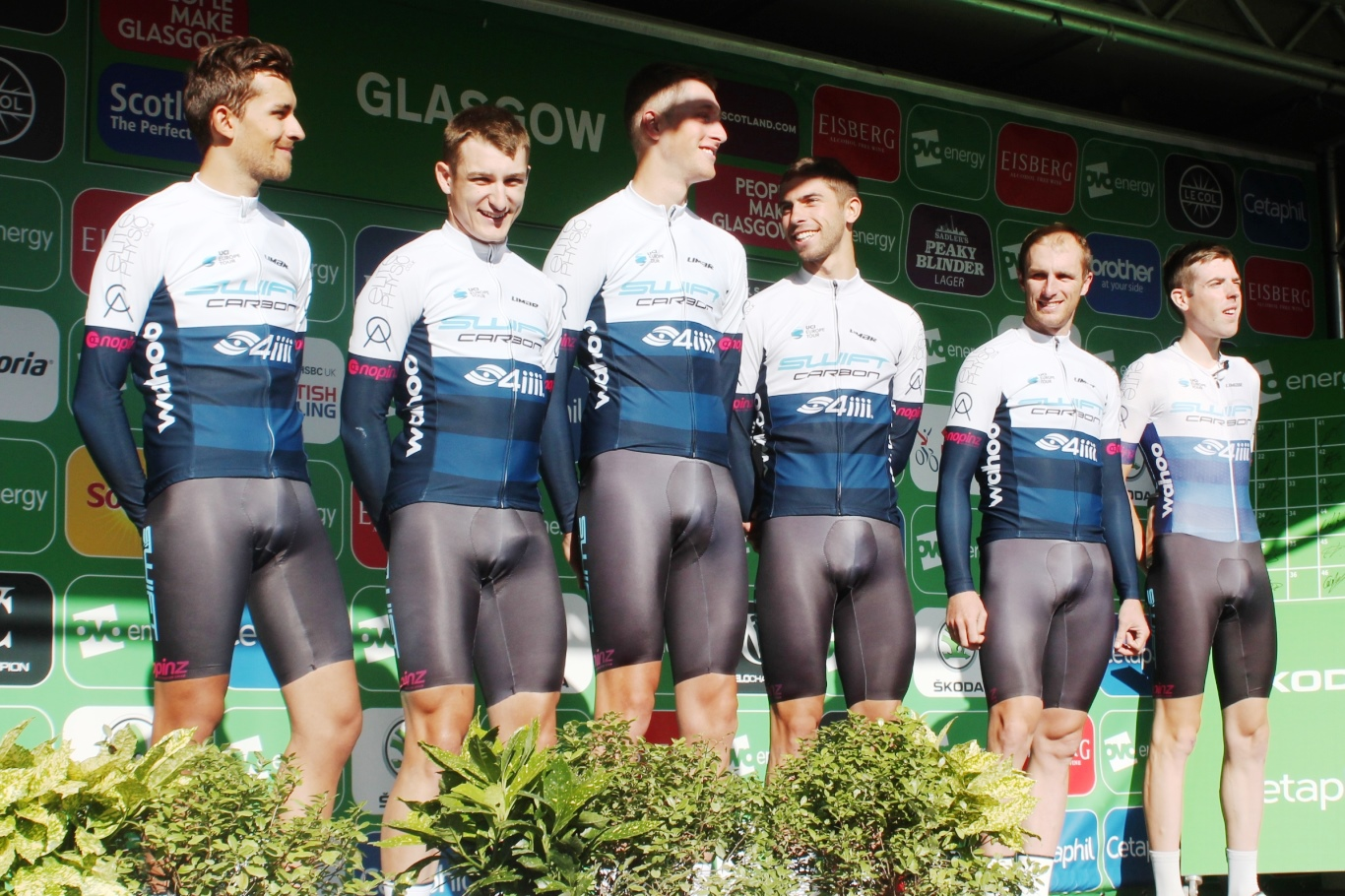

Team information
- UCI code: SCB
- Registered: Great Britain
- Founded: 2018
- Disbanded: 2021
- Discipline: Road
- Status: UCI Continental (2019–2021)
- Bicycles: SwiftCarbon
- Components: Shimano ultegra
- Website: Team home page

Key personnel
- Team manager: Paul Lamb

Team name history
- 2019–2021: SwiftCarbon Pro Cycling

SwiftCarbon Pro Cycling are a former British professional road bicycle racing team who participated in elite races. The team was registered as UCI Continental for the 2019 season until the 2021 season. The team disbanded at the end of the 2021 season due to a lack of sponsorship.

== Team roster ==
As of 15 May 2021.

Rider	Date of birth
William Bjergfelt (GBR)	4 December 1978 (age 47)
Alex Braybrooke (GBR)	12 August 1997 (age 29)
Ben Hardy (GBR)	20 April 1998 (age 28)
Will Harper (GBR)	27 February 1990 (age 36)
Owen James (GBR)	15 October 1995 (age 30)
Ross Lamb (GBR)	12 October 1995 (age 30)
Christopher Latham (GBR)	6 February 1994 (age 32)

Rider	Date of birth
Mitchell McLaughlin (IRL)	18 March 1998 (age 28)
Darragh O'Mahony (IRL)	30 December 1997 (age 28)
Alex Peters (GBR)	31 March 1994 (age 32)
Tristan Robbins (GBR)	26 May 1996 (age 30)
Andy Turner (GBR)	13 February 1995 (age 31)
Peter Williams (GBR)	13 December 1986 (age 39)
