= 2018 International Tour of Rhodes =

- 2018 UCI Europe Tour

Race details
- Dates: 9–11 March 2018
- Stages: 3
- Distance: 504 km (313.2 mi)
- Winning time: 11h 40' 28"

Results
	Winner	Mirco Maestri (ITA)	(Bardiani–CSF)
	Second	Torstein Traeen (NOR)	(Uno-X Norwegian Development Team)
	Third	Syver Waersted (NOR)	(Uno-X Norwegian Development Team)

The 2018 International Tour of Rhodes was the 12th edition of the International Tour of Rhodes road cycling stage race. It was part of UCI Europe Tour in category 2.2.

== Teams ==
Seventeen teams were invited to take part in the race. These included one UCI Professional Continental team, fifteen UCI Continental teams and one national team.

UCI Professional Continental Teams

- Bardiani–CSF

UCI Continental teams

- Akros–Renfer SA
- Pardus–Tufo Prostějov
- Polartec–Kometa
- Dauner D&DQ–Akkon
- Team Lotto–Kern Haus
- Team Sauerland NRW p/b SKS Germany
- Uno-X Norwegian Development Team
- Java Partizan
- Rodilios Iviskos Cycling Team
- Equipe CMI
- Global Cycling Team
- Oslofjord Cycling Team
- Union Raiffeisen Radteam Tirol
- Team Feldbinder Owayo KTM
- Thrakas Ippeas Team

National Teams

- Finland

== Route ==
Stage schedule
Stage	Date	Route	Distance	Type	Winner
1	9 March	Rhodes to Maritsa	156.5 km (97 mi)	Hilly stage	Mirco Maestri (ITA)
2	10 March	Rhodes to Koskinou	172.7 km (107 mi)	Hilly stage	Matteo Moschetti (ITA)
3	11 March	Rhodes to Rhodes	174.8 km (109 mi)	Hilly stage	Syver Waersted (NOR)

== Stages ==
=== Stage 1 ===
9 March 2018 — Rhodes to Maritsa, 156.5 km (97 mi)

Result of Stage 1
Rank	Rider	Team	Time
1	Mirco Maestri (ITA)	Bardiani–CSF	3h 39' 40"
2	Joshua Huppertz (GER)	Team Lotto–Kern Haus	+ 0"
3	Torstein Traeen (NOR)	Uno-X Norwegian Development Team	+ 0"
4	Paolo Simion (ITA)	Bardiani–CSF	+ 0"
5	Syver Waersted (NOR)	Uno-X Norwegian Development Team	+ 11"
6	Matteo Moschetti (ITA)	Polartec–Kometa	+ 11"
7	Matthew Overste (NED)	Global Cycling Team	+ 11"
8	Marco Maronese (ITA)	Bardiani–CSF	+ 11"
9	Aaron Grosser (GER)	Team Sauerland NRW p/b SKS Germany	+ 11"
10	Enrico Barbin (ITA)	Bardiani–CSF	+ 11"

General classification after Stage 1
Rank	Rider	Team	Time
1	Mirco Maestri (ITA)	Bardiani–CSF	3h 39' 25"
2	Joshua Huppertz (GER)	Team Lotto–Kern Haus	+ 6"
3	Torstein Traeen (NOR)	Uno-X Norwegian Development Team	+ 10"
4	Paolo Simion (ITA)	Bardiani–CSF	+ 12"
5	Syver Waersted (NOR)	Uno-X Norwegian Development Team	+ 26"
6	Matteo Moschetti (ITA)	Polartec–Kometa	+ 26"
7	Matthew Overste (NED)	Global Cycling Team	+ 26"
8	Marco Maronese (ITA)	Bardiani–CSF	+ 26"
9	Aaron Grosser (GER)	Team Sauerland NRW p/b SKS Germany	+ 26"
10	Enrico Barbin (ITA)	Bardiani–CSF	+ 26"

=== Stage 2 ===
10 March 2018 — Rhodes to Koskinou, 172.7 km (107 mi)

Result of Stage 2
Rank	Rider	Team	Time
1	Matteo Moschetti (ITA)	Polartec–Kometa	4h 09' 47"
2	Joshua Huppertz (GER)	Team Lotto–Kern Haus	+ 0"
3	Jonas Abrahamsen (NOR)	Uno-X Norwegian Development Team	+ 0"
4	Diego Pablo Sevilla (ESP)	Polartec–Kometa	+ 0"
5	Torstein Traeen (NOR)	Uno-X Norwegian Development Team	+ 0"
6	Enrico Barbin (ITA)	Bardiani–CSF	+ 9"
7	Matthew Overste (NED)	Global Cycling Team	+ 9"
8	Philipp Mamos (GER)	Dauner D&DQ–Akkon	+ 9"
9	Mirco Maestri (ITA)	Bardiani–CSF	+ 9"
10	Florian Nowak (GER)	Team Lotto–Kern Haus	+ 9"

General classification after Stage 2
Rank	Rider	Team	Time
1	Joshua Huppertz (GER)	Team Lotto–Kern Haus	7h 49' 12"
2	Mirco Maestri (ITA)	Bardiani–CSF	+ 9"
3	Torstein Traeen (NOR)	Uno-X Norwegian Development Team	+ 10"
4	Matteo Moschetti (ITA)	Polartec–Kometa	+ 16"
5	Diego Pablo Sevilla (ESP)	Polartec–Kometa	+ 26"
6	Matthew Overste (NED)	Global Cycling Team	+ 35"
7	Enrico Barbin (ITA)	Bardiani–CSF	+ 35"
8	Marius Blålid (NOR)	Uno-X Norwegian Development Team	+ 35"
9	Philipp Mamos (GER)	Dauner D&DQ–Akkon	+ 35"
10	Anders Skaarseth (NOR)	Uno-X Norwegian Development Team	+ 35"

=== Stage 3 ===
11 March 2018 — Rhodes to Rhodes, 174.8 km (109 mi)

Result of Stage 3
Rank	Rider	Team	Time
1	Syver Waersted (NOR)	Uno-X Norwegian Development Team	3h 51' 16"
2	Mirco Maestri (ITA)	Bardiani–CSF	+ 0"
3	Enrico Barbin (ITA)	Bardiani–CSF	+ 0"
4	Diego Pablo Sevilla (ESP)	Polartec–Kometa	+ 0"
5	Juan Camacho (ESP)	Polartec–Kometa	+ 0"
6	Alexandros Agrotis (CYP)	Thrakas Ippeas Team	+ 0"
7	Asbjørn Madsstuen (NOR)	Oslofjord Cycling Team	+ 0"
8	Gordian Banzer (SUI)	Akros–Renfer SA	+ 0"
9	Paolo Simion (ITA)	Bardiani–CSF	+ 0"
10	Philipp Mamos (GER)	Dauner D&DQ–Akkon	+ 0"

Final general classification
Rank	Rider	Team	Time
1	Mirco Maestri (ITA)	Bardiani–CSF	11h 40' 28"
2	Torstein Traeen (NOR)	Uno-X Norwegian Development Team	+ 10"
3	Syver Waersted (NOR)	Uno-X Norwegian Development Team	+ 25"
4	Diego Pablo Sevilla (ESP)	Polartec–Kometa	+ 26"
5	Enrico Barbin (ITA)	Bardiani–CSF	+ 31"
6	Anders Skaarseth (NOR)	Uno-X Norwegian Development Team	+ 32"
7	Philipp Mamos (GER)	Dauner D&DQ–Akkon	+ 35"
8	Gordian Banzer (SUI)	Akros–Renfer SA	+ 35"
9	Manuel Senni (ITA)	Bardiani–CSF	+ 35"
10	Alexandros Agrotis (CYP)	Thrakas Ippeas Team	+ 35"

== Classification leadership table ==
In the 2018 Istrian Spring Trophy, three different jerseys were awarded for the main classifications. For the general classification, calculated by adding each cyclist's finishing times on each stage, the leader received a yellow jersey. This classification was considered the most important of the 2018 Istrian Spring Trophy, and the winner of the classification was considered the winner of the race.

Additionally, there was a points classification, which awarded a red jersey. In the points classification, cyclists received points for finishing in the top 3 in each intermediate sprint. For winning an intermediate sprint, a rider earned 5 points. There was also a mountains classification, the leadership of which was marked by a green jersey. In the mountains classification, points were won by reaching the top of a climb before other cyclists, with more points available for the higher-categorised climbs.

Stage	Winner	General classification	Points classification	Mountains classification	Youth classification	Teams classification
1	Mirco Maestri	Mirco Maestri	Mirco Maestri	Joshua Huppertz	Syver Waersted	Bardiani–CSF
2	Matteo Moschetti	Joshua Huppertz	Mirco Maestri	Christian Haas	Matteo Moschetti	Uno-X Norwegian Development Team
3	Syver Waersted	Mirco Maestri	Mirco Maestri	Christian Haas	Syver Waersted	Bardiani–CSF
Final		Mirco Maestri	Mirco Maestri	Christian Haas	Syver Waersted	Bardiani–CSF
