= 2018 International Rhodes Grand Prix =

- 2018 UCI Europe Tour

Race details
- Dates: 4 March 2018
- Stages: 1
- Distance: 195 km (121.2 mi)
- Winning time: 4h 38' 05"

Results
	Winner	Matteo Moschetti (ITA)	(Polartec–Kometa)
	Second	Marco Maronese (ITA)	(Bardiani–CSF)
	Third	Joshua Huppertz (GER)	(Team Lotto–Kern Haus)

The 2018 International Rhodes Grand Prix was the 2nd edition of the International Rhodes Grand Prix road cycling one day race. It was part of UCI Europe Tour in category 1.2.

== Teams ==
Sixteen teams were invited to take part in the race. These included one UCI Professional Continental team, fourteen UCI Continental teams and one national team.

UCI Professional Continental Teams

- Bardiani–CSF

UCI Continental teams

- Akros–Renfer SA
- Pardus–Tufo Prostějov
- Polartec–Kometa
- Dauner D&DQ–Akkon
- Team Lotto–Kern Haus
- Team Sauerland NRW p/b SKS Germany
- Uno-X Norwegian Development Team
- Java Partizan
- Rodilios Iviskos Cycling Team
- Equipe CMI
- Global Cycling Team
- Oslofjord Cycling Team
- Union Raiffeisen Radteam Tirol
- Team Feldbinder Owayo KTM

National Teams

- Finland

== Result ==
Result
Rank	Rider	Team	Time
1	Matteo Moschetti (ITA)	Polartec–Kometa	4h 38' 05"
2	Marco Maronese (ITA)	Bardiani–CSF	+ 0"
3	Joshua Huppertz (GER)	Team Lotto–Kern Haus	+ 0"
4	Aaron Grosser (GER)	Team Sauerland NRW p/b SKS Germany	+ 0"
5	Nico Selenati (SUI)	Akros–Renfer SA	+ 0"
6	John Mandrysch (GER)	Dauner D&DQ–Akkon	+ 0"
7	Paolo Simion (ITA)	Bardiani–CSF	+ 0"
8	Georgios Bouglas (GRE)	Rodilios Iviskos Cycling Team	+ 0"
9	Matthew Overste (NED)	Global Cycling Team	+ 0"
10	Anders Skaarseth (NOR)	Uno-X Norwegian Development Team	+ 0"
