= 2021 Deutschland Tour =

2021 UCI Europe Tour 2021 UCI ProSeries

Race details
- Dates: 26 – 29 August 2021
- Stages: 4
- Distance: 720.5 km (447.7 mi)
- Winning time: 16h 29' 41"

Results
Jersey awarded to the overall winner	Winner	Nils Politt (GER)	(Bora–Hansgrohe)
	Second	Pascal Ackermann (GER)	(Bora–Hansgrohe)
	Third	Alexander Kristoff (NOR)	(UAE Team Emirates)
Jersey awarded to the points classification winner	Points	Pascal Ackermann (GER)	(Bora–Hansgrohe)
Jersey awarded to the mountains classification winner	Mountains	Louis Vervaeke (BEL)	(Alpecin–Fenix)
Jersey awarded to the youth classification winner	Youth	Georg Zimmermann (GER)	(Intermarché–Wanty–Gobert Matériaux)
Jersey awarded to the team classification winner	Team	Team Bahrain Victorious	

The 2021 Deutschland Tour was a men's road cycling stage race which took place from 26 to 29 August 2021. It was the 35th edition of the Deutschland Tour, which is rated as a 2.Pro event on the 2021 UCI Europe Tour and the 2021 UCI ProSeries calendars. This edition was the race's first in the UCI ProSeries; the 2020 edition was expected to feature in the inaugural UCI ProSeries but was cancelled due to the COVID-19 pandemic.

== Teams ==
Nine of the 19 UCI WorldTeams, seven UCI ProTeams, five UCI Continental teams, and the German national team made up the twenty-two teams that participated in the race. AG2R Citroën Team, with five riders, was the only team to not enter a full squad of six riders. With Uno-X Pro Cycling Team also reduced to five with one late non-starter, 130 riders started the race. Of these riders, only 72 finished.

UCI WorldTeams

- AG2R Citroën Team
- Bora–Hansgrohe
- Deceuninck–Quick-Step
- Intermarché–Wanty–Gobert Matériaux
- Israel Start-Up Nation
- Movistar Team
- Team Bahrain Victorious
- Team DSM
- UAE Team Emirates

UCI ProTeams

- Alpecin–Fenix
- B&B Hotels p/b KTM
- Equipo Kern Pharma
- Gazprom–RusVelo
- Rally Cycling
- Sport Vlaanderen–Baloise
- Uno-X Pro Cycling Team

UCI Continental Teams

- Bike Aid
- Dauner–Akkon
- P&S Metalltechnik
- Team Lotto–Kern Haus
- Team SKS Sauerland NRW

National Teams

- Germany

== Schedule ==
Stage characteristics and winners
Stage	Date	Route	Distance	Type	Stage winner
1	26 August	Stralsund to Schwerin	191.4 km (118.9 mi)	Flat stage	Pascal Ackermann (GER)
2	27 August	Sangerhausen to Ilmenau	180.8 km (112.3 mi)	Hilly stage	Alexander Kristoff (NOR)
3	28 August	Ilmenau to Erlangen	193.9 km (120.5 mi)	Hilly stage	Nils Politt (GER)
4	29 August	Erlangen to Nuremberg	154.4 km (95.9 mi)	Flat stage	Alexander Kristoff (NOR)
Total			720.5 km (447.7 mi)		

== Stages ==
=== Stage 1 ===
26 August 2021 – Stralsund to Schwerin, 191.4 km (118.9 mi)

Stage 1 Result
Rank	Rider	Team	Time
1	Pascal Ackermann (GER)	Bora–Hansgrohe	4h 07' 01"
2	Phil Bauhaus (GER)	Team Bahrain Victorious	+ 0"
3	Marco Haller (AUT)	Team Bahrain Victorious	+ 0"
4	Yves Lampaert (BEL)	Deceuninck–Quick-Step	+ 0"
5	Jannik Steimle (GER)	Deceuninck–Quick-Step	+ 0"
6	David van der Poel (NED)	Alpecin–Fenix	+ 0"
7	Luca Mozzato (ITA)	B&B Hotels p/b KTM	+ 0"
8	Jens Reynders (BEL)	Sport Vlaanderen–Baloise	+ 0"
9	Marco Canola (ITA)	Gazprom–RusVelo	+ 0"
10	Kim Heiduk (GER)	Team Lotto–Kern Haus	+ 0"

General classification after Stage 1
Rank	Rider	Team	Time
1	Pascal Ackermann (GER)	Bora–Hansgrohe	4h 06' 51"
2	Phil Bauhaus (GER)	Team Bahrain Victorious	+ 4"
3	Marco Haller (AUT)	Team Bahrain Victorious	+ 6"
4	Joshua Huppertz (GER)	Team Lotto–Kern Haus	+ 7"
5	Justin Wolf (GER)	Bike Aid	+ 8"
6	Jon Knolle (GER)	Team SKS Sauerland NRW	+ 9"
7	Yves Lampaert (BEL)	Deceuninck–Quick-Step	+ 10"
8	Jannik Steimle (GER)	Deceuninck–Quick-Step	+ 10"
9	David van der Poel (NED)	Alpecin–Fenix	+ 10"
10	Luca Mozzato (ITA)	B&B Hotels p/b KTM	+ 10"

=== Stage 2 ===
27 August 2021 – Sangerhausen to Ilmenau, 180.8 km (112.3 mi)

Stage 2 Result
Rank	Rider	Team	Time
1	Alexander Kristoff (NOR)	UAE Team Emirates	4h 24' 12"
2	Phil Bauhaus (GER)	Team Bahrain Victorious	+ 0"
3	Pascal Ackermann (GER)	Bora–Hansgrohe	+ 0"
4	Jannik Steimle (GER)	Deceuninck–Quick-Step	+ 2"
5	Sven Erik Bystrøm (NOR)	UAE Team Emirates	+ 2"
6	Rasmus Tiller (NOR)	Uno-X Pro Cycling Team	+ 2"
7	Jonas Koch (GER)	Intermarché–Wanty–Gobert Matériaux	+ 2"
8	Matteo Jorgenson (USA)	Movistar Team	+ 2"
9	Luca Mozzato (ITA)	B&B Hotels p/b KTM	+ 2"
10	Yves Lampaert (BEL)	Deceuninck–Quick-Step	+ 2"

General classification after Stage 2
Rank	Rider	Team	Time
1	Pascal Ackermann (GER)	Bora–Hansgrohe	8h 30' 59"
2	Phil Bauhaus (GER)	Team Bahrain Victorious	+ 2"
3	Alexander Kristoff (NOR)	UAE Team Emirates	+ 4"
4	Marco Haller (AUT)	Team Bahrain Victorious	+ 11"
5	Georg Zimmermann (GER)	Intermarché–Wanty–Gobert Matériaux	+ 13"
6	Joshua Huppertz (GER)	Team Lotto–Kern Haus	+ 13"
7	Nils Politt (GER)	Bora–Hansgrohe	+ 14"
8	Jannik Steimle (GER)	Deceuninck–Quick-Step	+ 16"
9	Yves Lampaert (BEL)	Deceuninck–Quick-Step	+ 16"
10	Luca Mozzato (ITA)	B&B Hotels p/b KTM	+ 16"

=== Stage 3 ===
28 August 2021 – Ilmenau to Erlangen, 193.9 km (120.5 mi)

Stage 3 Result
Rank	Rider	Team	Time
1	Nils Politt (GER)	Bora–Hansgrohe	4h 25' 15"
2	Dylan Teuns (BEL)	Team Bahrain Victorious	+ 11"
3	André Greipel (GER)	Israel Start-Up Nation	+ 12"
4	Pascal Ackermann (GER)	Bora–Hansgrohe	+ 12"
5	John Degenkolb (GER)	Germany	+ 12"
6	Mark Cavendish (GBR)	Deceuninck–Quick-Step	+ 12"
7	Marius Mayrhofer (GER)	Team DSM	+ 12"
8	Alexander Kristoff (NOR)	UAE Team Emirates	+ 12"
9	Sebastián Mora (ESP)	Movistar Team	+ 12"
10	Johannes Hodapp (GER)	Team SKS Sauerland NRW	+ 12"

General classification after Stage 3
Rank	Rider	Team	Time
1	Nils Politt (GER)	Bora–Hansgrohe	12h 56' 18"
2	Pascal Ackermann (GER)	Bora–Hansgrohe	+ 8"
3	Phil Bauhaus (GER)	Team Bahrain Victorious	+ 10"
4	Alexander Kristoff (NOR)	UAE Team Emirates	+ 12"
5	Dylan Teuns (BEL)	Team Bahrain Victorious	+ 17"
6	Georg Zimmermann (GER)	Intermarché–Wanty–Gobert Matériaux	+ 18"
7	Marco Haller (AUT)	Team Bahrain Victorious	+ 19"
8	Joshua Huppertz (GER)	Team Lotto–Kern Haus	+ 21"
9	Marcel Meisen (GER)	Alpecin–Fenix	+ 22"
10	Marco Canola (ITA)	Gazprom–RusVelo	+ 23"

=== Stage 4 ===
29 August 2021 – Erlangen to Nuremberg, 154.4 km (95.9 mi)

Stage 4 Result
Rank	Rider	Team	Time
1	Alexander Kristoff (NOR)	UAE Team Emirates	3h 33' 25"
2	Pascal Ackermann (GER)	Bora–Hansgrohe	+ 0"
3	Luca Mozzato (ITA)	B&B Hotels p/b KTM	+ 0"
4	Rasmus Tiller (NOR)	Uno-X Pro Cycling Team	+ 0"
5	Kiko Galván (ESP)	Equipo Kern Pharma	+ 0"
6	Marco Haller (AUT)	Team Bahrain Victorious	+ 0"
7	Jannik Steimle (GER)	Deceuninck–Quick-Step	+ 0"
8	Valentin Retailleau (FRA)	AG2R Citroën Team	+ 0"
9	John Degenkolb (GER)	Germany	+ 0"
10	Jonas Koch (GER)	Intermarché–Wanty–Gobert Matériaux	+ 0"

General classification after Stage 4
Rank	Rider	Team	Time
1	Nils Politt (GER)	Bora–Hansgrohe	16h 29' 41"
2	Pascal Ackermann (GER)	Bora–Hansgrohe	+ 4"
3	Alexander Kristoff (NOR)	UAE Team Emirates	+ 4"
4	Dylan Teuns (BEL)	Team Bahrain Victorious	+ 19"
5	Georg Zimmermann (GER)	Intermarché–Wanty–Gobert Matériaux	+ 19"
6	Marco Haller (AUT)	Team Bahrain Victorious	+ 21"
7	Luca Mozzato (ITA)	B&B Hotels p/b KTM	+ 22"
8	Marco Canola (ITA)	Gazprom–RusVelo	+ 22"
9	Marcel Meisen (GER)	Alpecin–Fenix	+ 24"
10	Jonas Koch (GER)	Intermarché–Wanty–Gobert Matériaux	+ 26"

== Classification leadership table ==
Classification leadership by stage
Stage	Winner	General classification	Points classification	Mountains classification	Young rider classification	Team classification	Combativity award
1	Pascal Ackermann	Pascal Ackermann	Pascal Ackermann	Robert Jägeler	Jon Knolle	Deceuninck–Quick-Step	Jon Knolle
2	Alexander Kristoff	Pascal Ackermann	Pascal Ackermann	Kyle Murphy	Georg Zimmermann	UAE Team Emirates	Louis Vervaeke
3	Nils Politt	Nils Politt	Pascal Ackermann	Louis Vervaeke	Georg Zimmermann	Team Bahrain Victorious	Henri Uhlig
4	Alexander Kristoff	Nils Politt	Pascal Ackermann	Louis Vervaeke	Georg Zimmermann	Team Bahrain Victorious	Dylan Teuns
Final		Nils Politt	Pascal Ackermann	Louis Vervaeke	Georg Zimmermann	Team Bahrain Victorious	Not awarded

- On stages 2 and 3, Phil Bauhaus, who was second in the points classification, wore the green jersey, because first-placed Pascal Ackermann wore the red jersey as the leader of the general classification.

== Final classification standings ==
Legend
Denotes the winner of the general classification	Denotes the winner of the young rider classification
Denotes the winner of the points classification	Denotes the winner of the team classification
Denotes the winner of the mountains classification	Denotes the winner of the combativity award

=== General classification ===
Final general classification (1–10)
Rank	Rider	Team	Time
1	Nils Politt (GER)	Bora–Hansgrohe	16h 29' 41"
2	Pascal Ackermann (GER)	Bora–Hansgrohe	+ 4"
3	Alexander Kristoff (NOR)	UAE Team Emirates	+ 4"
4	Dylan Teuns (BEL)	Team Bahrain Victorious	+ 19"
5	Georg Zimmermann (GER)	Intermarché–Wanty–Gobert Matériaux	+ 19"
6	Marco Haller (AUT)	Team Bahrain Victorious	+ 21"
7	Luca Mozzato (ITA)	B&B Hotels p/b KTM	+ 22"
8	Marco Canola (ITA)	Gazprom–RusVelo	+ 22"
9	Marcel Meisen (GER)	Alpecin–Fenix	+ 24"
10	Jonas Koch (GER)	Intermarché–Wanty–Gobert Matériaux	+ 26"

=== Points classification ===
Final points classification (1–10)
Rank	Rider	Team	Points
1	Pascal Ackermann (GER)	Bora–Hansgrohe	46
2	Alexander Kristoff (NOR)	UAE Team Emirates	33
3	Jannik Steimle (GER)	Deceuninck–Quick-Step	17
4	Nils Politt (GER)	Bora–Hansgrohe	15
5	Dylan Teuns (BEL)	Team Bahrain Victorious	15
6	Luca Mozzato (ITA)	B&B Hotels p/b KTM	15
7	Marco Haller (AUT)	Team Bahrain Victorious	14
8	Rasmus Tiller (NOR)	Uno-X Pro Cycling Team	12
9	Matteo Jorgenson (USA)	Movistar Team	8
10	John Degenkolb (GER)	Germany	8

=== Mountains classification ===
Final mountains classification (1–10)
Rank	Rider	Team	Points
1	Louis Vervaeke (BEL)	Alpecin–Fenix	10
2	Dario Cataldo (ITA)	Movistar Team	10
3	Justin Wolf (GER)	Bike Aid	8
4	Rémi Cavagna (FRA)	Deceuninck–Quick-Step	5
5	Kyle Murphy (USA)	Rally Cycling	5
6	Dylan Teuns (BEL)	Team Bahrain Victorious	4
7	Jannis Peter (GER)	Germany	4
8	Robert Jägeler (GER)	P&S Metalltechnik	3
9	Julian Lino (FRA)	Bike Aid	3
10	Jannik Steimle (GER)	Deceuninck–Quick-Step	2

=== Young rider classification ===
Final young rider classification (1–10)
Rank	Rider	Team	Time
1	Georg Zimmermann (GER)	Intermarché–Wanty–Gobert Matériaux	16h 30' 00"
2	Luca Mozzato (ITA)	B&B Hotels p/b KTM	+ 3"
3	Jannik Steimle (GER)	Deceuninck–Quick-Step	+ 7"
4	Tom Lindner (GER)	P&S Metalltechnik	+ 7"
5	Rasmus Tiller (NOR)	Uno-X Pro Cycling Team	+ 7"
6	Juri Hollmann (GER)	Movistar Team	+ 7"
7	Jonas Rutsch (GER)	Germany	+ 7"
8	Fabio Van den Bossche (BEL)	Sport Vlaanderen–Baloise	+ 7"
9	João Almeida (POR)	Deceuninck–Quick-Step	+ 7"
10	Roger Adrià (ESP)	Equipo Kern Pharma	+ 7"

=== Team classification ===
Final team classification (1–10)
Rank	Team	Time
1	Team Bahrain Victorious	49h 30' 18"
2	UAE Team Emirates	+ 1"
3	Deceuninck–Quick-Step	+ 10"
4	Alpecin–Fenix	+ 42"
5	Movistar Team	+ 2' 11"
6	Germany	+ 3' 15"
7	Uno-X Pro Cycling Team	+ 4' 05"
8	Sport Vlaanderen–Baloise	+ 4' 19"
9	Bora–Hansgrohe	+ 4' 30"
10	Equipo Kern Pharma	+ 6' 57"
