= 2019 Deutschland Tour =

2019 UCI Europe Tour

Race details
- Dates: 29 August – 1 September 2019
- Stages: 4
- Distance: 717.5 km (445.8 mi)
- Winning time: 16h 23' 09"

Results
Jersey awarded to the overall winner	Winner	Jasper Stuyven (BEL)	(Trek–Segafredo)
	Second	Sonny Colbrelli (ITA)	(Bahrain–Merida)
	Third	Yves Lampaert (BEL)	(Deceuninck–Quick-Step)
Jersey awarded to the points classification winner	Points	Sonny Colbrelli (ITA)	(Bahrain–Merida)
Jersey awarded to the mountains classification winner	Mountains	Magnus Cort (DEN)	(Astana)
Jersey awarded to the youth classification winner	Youth	Marc Hirschi (SUI)	(Team Sunweb)
	Team	Deceuninck–Quick-Step	

The 2019 Deutschland Tour was a road cycling stage race that took place between 29 August and 1 September 2019. This year's edition of the Deutschland Tour was the 34th edition and was rated as a 2.HC event as part of the 2019 UCI Europe Tour. The defending champion, Slovenian Matej Mohorič of Bahrain–Merida, did not return to defend his title, though his team was invited. After taking the lead in the overall classification after stage 3, Belgian Jasper Stuyven of Trek–Segafredo held off Sonny Colbrelli and Yves Lampaert, who finished second and third overall respectively, on the final stage to take the overall victory.

== Teams ==
A total of 22 teams with 6 riders each participated in the event: 15 UCI WorldTeams, 3 UCI Professional Continental teams and 4 UCI Continental Teams.

UCI WorldTeams

- AG2R La Mondiale
- Astana
- Bahrain–Merida
- Bora–Hansgrohe
- CCC Team
- Deceuninck–Quick-Step
- EF Education First
- Lotto–Soudal
- Team Dimension Data
- Team Katusha–Alpecin
- Team Ineos
- Team Jumbo–Visma
- Team Sunweb
- Trek–Segafredo
- UAE Team Emirates

UCI Professional Continental Teams

- Arkéa–Samsic
- Gazprom–RusVelo
- Wanty–Gobert

UCI Continental Teams

- Bike Aid
- Dauner–Akkon
- P&S Metalltechnik
- Team Lotto–Kern Haus

== Route ==
The route of the 2019 Deutschland Tour went through central Germany and crossed through 4 German states. It started in Hannover, Lower Saxony and crossed through Saxony-Anhalt and Hesse before finishing in Erfurt, Thuringia.

Stage characteristics and winners
Stage	Date	Course	Distance	Type	Winner
1	29 August	Hannover to Halberstadt	167 km (103.8 mi)	Flat stage	Pascal Ackermann (GER)
2	30 August	Marburg to Göttingen	202 km (125.5 mi)	Hilly stage	Alexander Kristoff (NOR)
3	31 August	Göttingen to Eisenach	189 km (117.4 mi)	Hilly stage	Kasper Asgreen (DEN)
4	1 September	Eisenach to Erfurt	159.5 km (99.1 mi)	Hilly stage	Sonny Colbrelli (ITA)
Total			717.5 km (445.8 mi)		

== Stages ==
=== Stage 1 ===
29 August 2019 — Hannover to Halberstadt, 167 km (103.8 mi)

Stage 1 result
Rank	Rider	Team	Time
1	Pascal Ackermann (GER)	Bora–Hansgrohe	3h 49' 30"
2	Alexander Kristoff (NOR)	UAE Team Emirates	+ 0"
3	Simone Consonni (ITA)	UAE Team Emirates	+ 0"
4	Cees Bol (NED)	Team Sunweb	+ 0"
5	Jasper Stuyven (BEL)	Trek–Segafredo	+ 0"
6	Kasper Asgreen (DEN)	Deceuninck–Quick-Step	+ 0"
7	Reinardt Janse van Rensburg (SAF)	Team Dimension Data	+ 0"
8	Nico Denz (GER)	AG2R La Mondiale	+ 0"
9	Nils Politt (GER)	Team Katusha–Alpecin	+ 0"
10	Sonny Colbrelli (ITA)	Bahrain–Merida	+ 0"

General classification after stage 1
Rank	Rider	Team	Time
1	Pascal Ackermann (GER)	Bora–Hansgrohe	3h 49' 20"
2	Alexander Kristoff (NOR)	UAE Team Emirates	+ 4"
3	Simone Consonni (ITA)	UAE Team Emirates	+ 6"
4	Tom-Jelte Slagter (NED)	Team Dimension Data	+ 8"
5	Kasper Asgreen (DEN)	Deceuninck–Quick-Step	+ 9"
6	Cees Bol (NED)	Team Sunweb	+ 10"
7	Jasper Stuyven (BEL)	Trek–Segafredo	+ 10"
8	Reinardt Janse van Rensburg (SAF)	Team Dimension Data	+ 10"
9	Nico Denz (GER)	AG2R La Mondiale	+ 10"
10	Nils Politt (GER)	Team Katusha–Alpecin	+ 10"

=== Stage 2 ===
30 August 2019 — Marburg to Göttingen, 202 km (125.5 mi)

Stage 2 result
Rank	Rider	Team	Time
1	Alexander Kristoff (NOR)	UAE Team Emirates	4h 21' 04"
2	Sonny Colbrelli (ITA)	Bahrain–Merida	+ 0"
3	Yves Lampaert (BEL)	Deceuninck–Quick-Step	+ 0"
4	Ben Swift (GBR)	Team Ineos	+ 0"
5	Jasper Stuyven (BEL)	Trek–Segafredo	+ 0"
6	Reinardt Janse van Rensburg (SAF)	Team Dimension Data	+ 0"
7	Marc Hirschi (SUI)	Team Sunweb	+ 0"
8	Timo Roosen (NED)	Team Jumbo–Visma	+ 0"
9	Toms Skujiņš (LVA)	Trek–Segafredo	+ 0"
10	Jens Keukeleire (BEL)	Lotto–Soudal	+ 0"

General classification after stage 2
Rank	Rider	Team	Time
1	Alexander Kristoff (NOR)	UAE Team Emirates	8h 10' 18"
2	Sonny Colbrelli (ITA)	Bahrain–Merida	+ 10"
3	Yves Lampaert (BEL)	Deceuninck–Quick-Step	+ 12"
4	Marc Hirschi (SUI)	Team Sunweb	+ 13"
5	Alexey Lutsenko (KAZ)	Astana	+ 14"
6	Tom-Jelte Slagter (NED)	Team Dimension Data	+ 14"
7	Diego Ulissi (ITA)	UAE Team Emirates	+ 15"
8	Jasper Stuyven (BEL)	Trek–Segafredo	+ 16"
9	Reinardt Janse van Rensburg (SAF)	Team Dimension Data	+ 16"
10	Ben Swift (GBR)	Team Ineos	+ 16"

=== Stage 3 ===
31 August 2019 — Göttingen to Eisenach, 189 km (117.4 mi)

Stage 3 result
Rank	Rider	Team	Time
1	Kasper Asgreen (DEN)	Deceuninck–Quick-Step	4h 27' 53"
2	Jasper Stuyven (BEL)	Trek–Segafredo	+ 0"
3	Sonny Colbrelli (ITA)	Bahrain–Merida	+ 17"
4	Yves Lampaert (BEL)	Deceuninck–Quick-Step	+ 17"
5	Tom-Jelte Slagter (NED)	Team Dimension Data	+ 17"
6	Marc Hirschi (SUI)	Team Sunweb	+ 17"
7	Toms Skujiņš (LVA)	Trek–Segafredo	+ 17"
8	Jens Keukeleire (BEL)	Lotto–Soudal	+ 17"
9	Diego Ulissi (ITA)	UAE Team Emirates	+ 17"
10	Jhonatan Narváez (ECU)	Team Ineos	+ 17"

General classification after stage 3
Rank	Rider	Team	Time
1	Jasper Stuyven (BEL)	Trek–Segafredo	12h 38' 21"
2	Sonny Colbrelli (ITA)	Bahrain–Merida	+ 13"
3	Alexey Lutsenko (KAZ)	Astana	+ 18"
4	Yves Lampaert (BEL)	Deceuninck–Quick-Step	+ 19"
5	Marc Hirschi (SUI)	Team Sunweb	+ 20"
6	Diego Ulissi (ITA)	UAE Team Emirates	+ 20"
7	Tom-Jelte Slagter (NED)	Team Dimension Data	+ 21"
8	Jonas Vingegaard (DEN)	Team Jumbo–Visma	+ 22"
9	Jens Keukeleire (BEL)	Lotto–Soudal	+ 23"
10	Toms Skujiņš (LVA)	Trek–Segafredo	+ 23"

=== Stage 4 ===
1 September 2019 — Eisenach to Erfurt, 159.5 km (99.1 mi)

Stage 4 result
Rank	Rider	Team	Time
1	Sonny Colbrelli (ITA)	Bahrain–Merida	3h 44' 48"
2	Yves Lampaert (BEL)	Deceuninck–Quick-Step	+ 0"
3	Alexander Kristoff (NOR)	UAE Team Emirates	+ 0"
4	Alexey Lutsenko (KAZ)	Astana	+ 0"
5	Jasper Stuyven (BEL)	Trek–Segafredo	+ 0"
6	Diego Ulissi (ITA)	UAE Team Emirates	+ 0"
7	Cees Bol (NED)	Team Sunweb	+ 0"
8	Ben Swift (GBR)	Team Ineos	+ 0"
9	Tom-Jelte Slagter (NED)	Team Dimension Data	+ 0"
10	Simon Geschke (GER)	CCC Team	+ 0"

General classification after stage 4 (1-10)
Rank	Rider	Team	Time
1	Jasper Stuyven (BEL)	Trek–Segafredo	16h 23' 09"
2	Sonny Colbrelli (ITA)	Bahrain–Merida	+ 3"
3	Yves Lampaert (BEL)	Deceuninck–Quick-Step	+ 12"
4	Alexey Lutsenko (KAZ)	Astana	+ 15"
5	Diego Ulissi (ITA)	UAE Team Emirates	+ 20"
6	Marc Hirschi (SUI)	Team Sunweb	+ 20"
7	Jens Keukeleire (BEL)	Lotto–Soudal	+ 21"
8	Tom-Jelte Slagter (NED)	Team Dimension Data	+ 21"
9	Jonas Vingegaard (DEN)	Team Jumbo–Visma	+ 22"
10	Toms Skujiņš (LVA)	Trek–Segafredo	+ 23"

== Classification leadership ==
Classification leadership by stage
Stage	Winner	General classification	Points classification	Mountains classification	Young rider classification	Team classification	Combativity award
1	Pascal Ackermann	Pascal Ackermann	Pascal Ackermann	Julien Bernard	Pascal Ackermann	UAE Team Emirates	Julien Bernard
2	Alexander Kristoff	Alexander Kristoff	Alexander Kristoff	Davide Villella	Marc Hirschi	UAE Team Emirates	Remco Evenepoel
3	Kasper Asgreen	Jasper Stuyven	Alexander Kristoff	Vincenzo Nibali	Marc Hirschi	Deceuninck–Quick-Step	Alexey Lutsenko
4	Sonny Colbrelli	Jasper Stuyven	Sonny Colbrelli	Magnus Cort	Marc Hirschi	Deceuninck–Quick-Step	Joshua Huppertz
Final		Jasper Stuyven	Sonny Colbrelli	Magnus Cort	Marc Hirschi	Deceuninck–Quick-Step	not awarded

== Classification standings ==
Legend
Denotes the leader of the general classification	Denotes the leader of the mountains classification
Denotes the leader of the points classification	Denotes the leader of the young rider classification

=== General classification ===
Final general classification (1-10)
Rank	Rider	Team	Time
1	Jasper Stuyven (BEL)	Trek–Segafredo	16h 23' 09"
2	Sonny Colbrelli (ITA)	Bahrain–Merida	+ 3"
3	Yves Lampaert (BEL)	Deceuninck–Quick-Step	+ 12"
4	Alexey Lutsenko (KAZ)	Astana	+ 15"
5	Diego Ulissi (ITA)	UAE Team Emirates	+ 20"
6	Marc Hirschi (SUI)	Team Sunweb	+ 20"
7	Jens Keukeleire (BEL)	Lotto–Soudal	+ 21"
8	Tom-Jelte Slagter (NED)	Team Dimension Data	+ 21"
9	Jonas Vingegaard (DEN)	Team Jumbo–Visma	+ 22"
10	Toms Skujiņš (LVA)	Trek–Segafredo	+ 23"

=== Points classification ===
Final points classification (1-10)
Rank	Rider	Team	Points
1	Sonny Colbrelli (ITA)	Bahrain–Merida	37
2	Alexander Kristoff (NOR)	UAE Team Emirates	36
3	Jasper Stuyven (BEL)	Trek–Segafredo	30
4	Yves Lampaert (BEL)	Deceuninck–Quick-Step	28
5	Kasper Asgreen (DEN)	Deceuninck–Quick-Step	23
6	Julian Alaphilippe (FRA)	Deceuninck–Quick-Step	11
7	Cees Bol (NED)	Team Sunweb	11
8	Remco Evenepoel (BEL)	Deceuninck–Quick-Step	10
9	Joshua Huppertz (GER)	Team Lotto–Kern Haus	10
10	Ben Swift (GBR)	Team Ineos	10

=== Mountains classification ===
Final mountains classification (1-10)
Rank	Rider	Team	Points
1	Magnus Cort (DEN)	Astana	8
2	Vincenzo Nibali (ITA)	Bahrain–Merida	8
3	Remco Evenepoel (BEL)	Deceuninck–Quick-Step	5
4	Jenthe Biermans (BEL)	Team Katusha–Alpecin	5
5	Julian Alaphilippe (FRA)	Deceuninck–Quick-Step	5
6	Davide Villella (ITA)	Astana	3
7	Miká Heming (GER)	Dauner–Akkon	3
8	Mads Pedersen (DEN)	Trek–Segafredo	3
9	Alexey Lutsenko (KAZ)	Astana	2
10	Igor Boev (RUS)	Gazprom–RusVelo	2

=== Young rider classification ===
Final young rider classification (1-10)
Rank	Rider	Team	Time
1	Marc Hirschi (SUI)	Team Sunweb	16h 23' 29"
2	Jonas Vingegaard (DEN)	Team Jumbo–Visma	+ 2"
3	Jhonatan Narváez (ECU)	Team Ineos	+ 3"
4	Jai Hindley (AUS)	Team Sunweb	+ 26"
5	Nils Politt (GER)	Team Katusha–Alpecin	+ 1' 06"
6	Remco Evenepoel (BEL)	Deceuninck–Quick-Step	+ 7' 10"
7	Alexandr Riabushenko (BLR)	UAE Team Emirates	+ 7' 29"
8	Kasper Asgreen (DEN)	Deceuninck–Quick-Step	+ 7' 54"
9	Enric Mas (ESP)	Deceuninck–Quick-Step	+ 9' 01"
10	Jenthe Biermans (BEL)	Team Katusha–Alpecin	+ 9' 15"

=== Team classification ===
Final teams classification (1-10)
Rank	Team	Time
1	Deceuninck–Quick-Step	49h 12' 31"
2	Team Dimension Data	+ 3' 04"
3	Trek–Segafredo	+ 4' 48"
4	Team Sunweb	+ 5' 31"
5	AG2R La Mondiale	+ 6' 18"
6	UAE Team Emirates	+ 6' 34"
7	Team Jumbo–Visma	+ 6' 58"
8	Lotto–Soudal	+ 7' 09"
9	Bahrain–Merida	+ 8' 56"
10	CCC Team	+ 11' 36"
