= Skaarseth =

Skaarseth is a Norwegian surname. Notable people with the surname include:

- Anders Skaarseth (born 1995), Norwegian cyclist
- Iver Skaarseth (born 1998), Norwegian cyclist
