= Enrico Barbin =

Italian cyclist

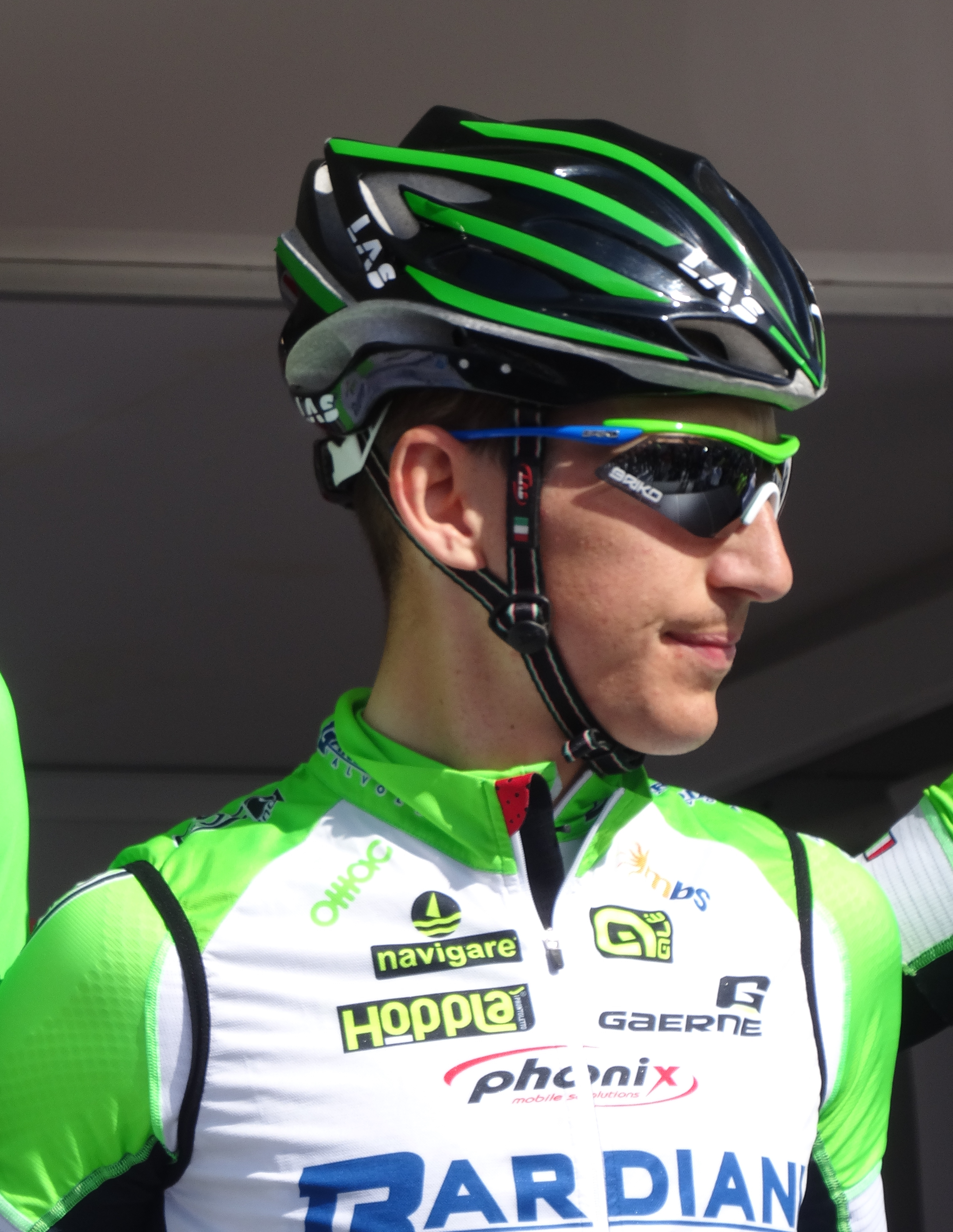
- Enrico Barbin in 2014

Personal information
- Full name: Enrico Barbin
- Born: 4 March 1990 (age 36) Treviglio, Italy

Cycling career
- Sport: Cycling
- Discipline: Road
- Role: Rider
- Rider type: All-rounder

Amateur teams
- 2007–2008: Team F.lli Giorgi
- 2009: Garda–Lucchini–Arvedi–Unidelta
- 2010–2012: U.C. Trevigiani–Dynamon–Bottoli
- 2012: Colnago–CSF Bardiani (stagiaire)

Professional team
- 2013–2019: Bardiani Valvole–CSF Inox

Enrico Barbin (born 4 March 1990) is an Italian racing cyclist, who last rode for UCI Professional Continental team Bardiani–CSF. He rode in the Giro d'Italia in 2014, 2015 and 2017.

== Major results ==
2010
3rd Memorial Rino Fiori
10th Trofeo Città di Brescia
2011
1st Stage 1 Giro del Veneto
4th Giro del Belvedere
6th Coppa della Pace
10th Gran Premio di Poggiana
2012
1st Gran Premio della Liberazione
1st Trofeo Città di San Vendemiano
1st Trofeo Alcide Degasperi
1st Stage 1 Toscana-Terra di Ciclismo
1st Stage 6 Girobio
2nd Giro del Belvedere
3rd Coppa della Pace
3rd Piccolo Giro di Lombardia
7th Gran Premio Industria e Commercio Artigianato Carnaghese
7th Trofeo Gianfranco Bianchin
8th Ruota d'Oro
10th Trofeo Edil C
2013
4th Roma Maxima
8th Overall Tour of Slovenia
2014
9th Gran Premio della Costa Etruschi
10th Overall Tour of Turkey
2015
7th Overall Tour of Turkey
7th Memorial Marco Pantani
2016
7th Memorial Marco Pantani
2017 (1 pro win)
1st Stage 6 Tour de Langkawi
7th Coppa Ugo Agostoni
2018
5th Overall International Tour of Rhodes
Giro d'Italia

Held after Stages 2–5

=== Grand Tour general classification results timeline ===
Grand Tour	2014	2015	2016	2017	2018	2019
Giro d'Italia	119	DNF	—	124	94	DNF
Tour de France	Did not contest during his career					
Vuelta a España	Did not contest during his career					

Legend
—	Did not compete
DNF	Did not finish
