= Immanuel Stark =

German bicycle racer

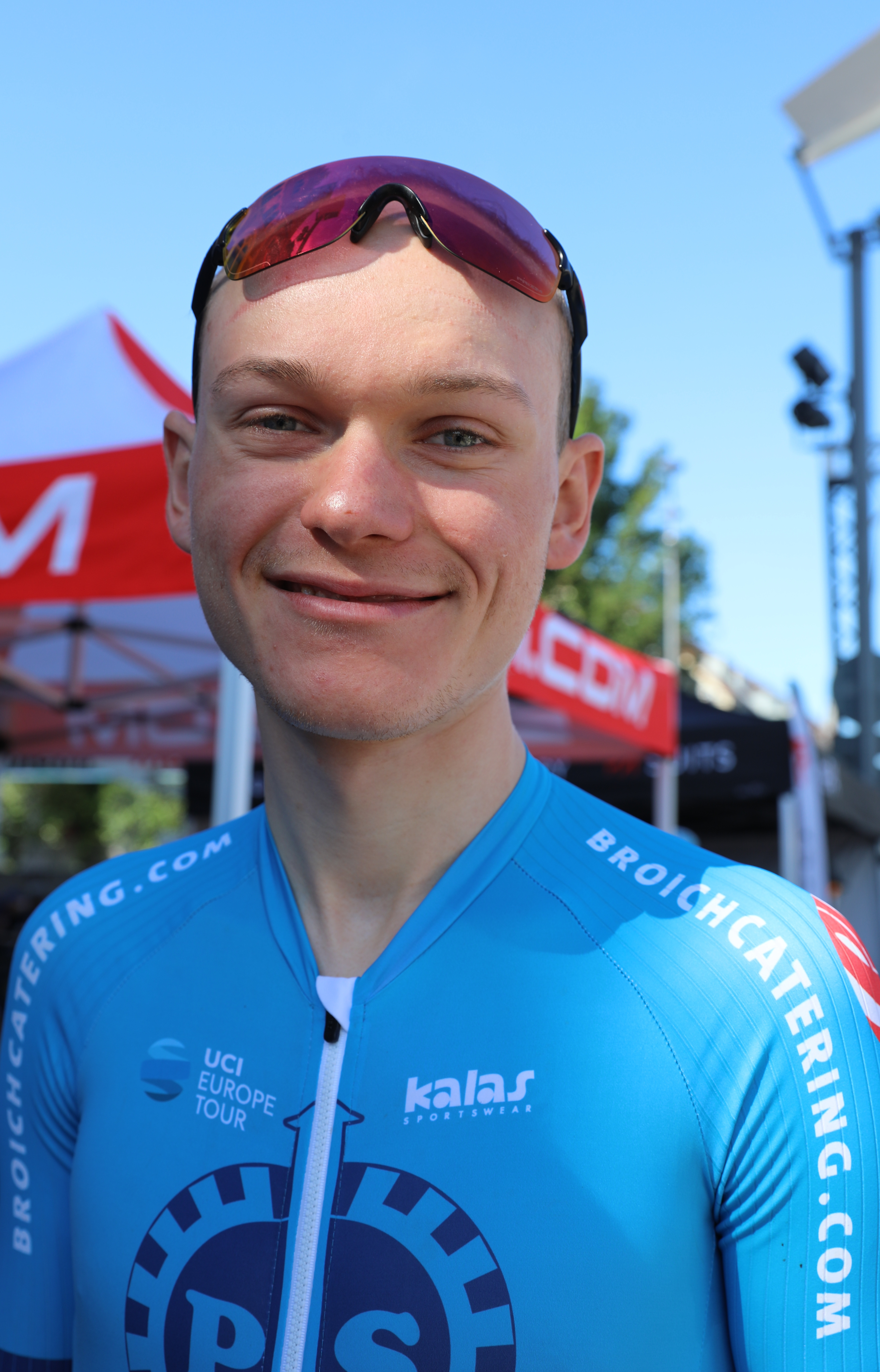
- Stark at the 2019 Rund um Köln

Personal information
- Born: 10 October 1994 (age 32) Stollberg, Germany
- Height: 1.78 m (5 ft 10 in)
- Weight: 67 kg (148 lb)

Cycling career
- Sport: Cycling
- Disciplines: Road; Gravel
- Role: Rider

Amateur teams
- 2010–2013: RSG 52 Stollberg
- 2014–2016: Dresdner SC 1898
- 2017–2018: RFV Die Löwen Weimar

Professional team
- 2019–2022: P&S Metalltechnik

Immanuel Stark (born 10 October 1994) is a German cyclist, who last rode for UCI Continental team P&S Benotti.

== Major results ==
2016
3rd Rund um den Sachsenring
2018
1st National Hill Climb Championships
1st Overall Tour of Vysočina

1st Stage 1

6th Raiffeisen Grand Prix
2021
1st Overall Tour of Bulgaria

1st Mountains classification
1st Stage 2

1st Overall In the footsteps of the Romans

1st Stage 1

1st Mountains classification, Oberösterreichrundfahrt
2nd Overall CCC Tour - Grody Piastowskie
2023
UCI Gravel World Series

2nd Gravel Adventure
