= Robert Retschke =

German bicycle racer

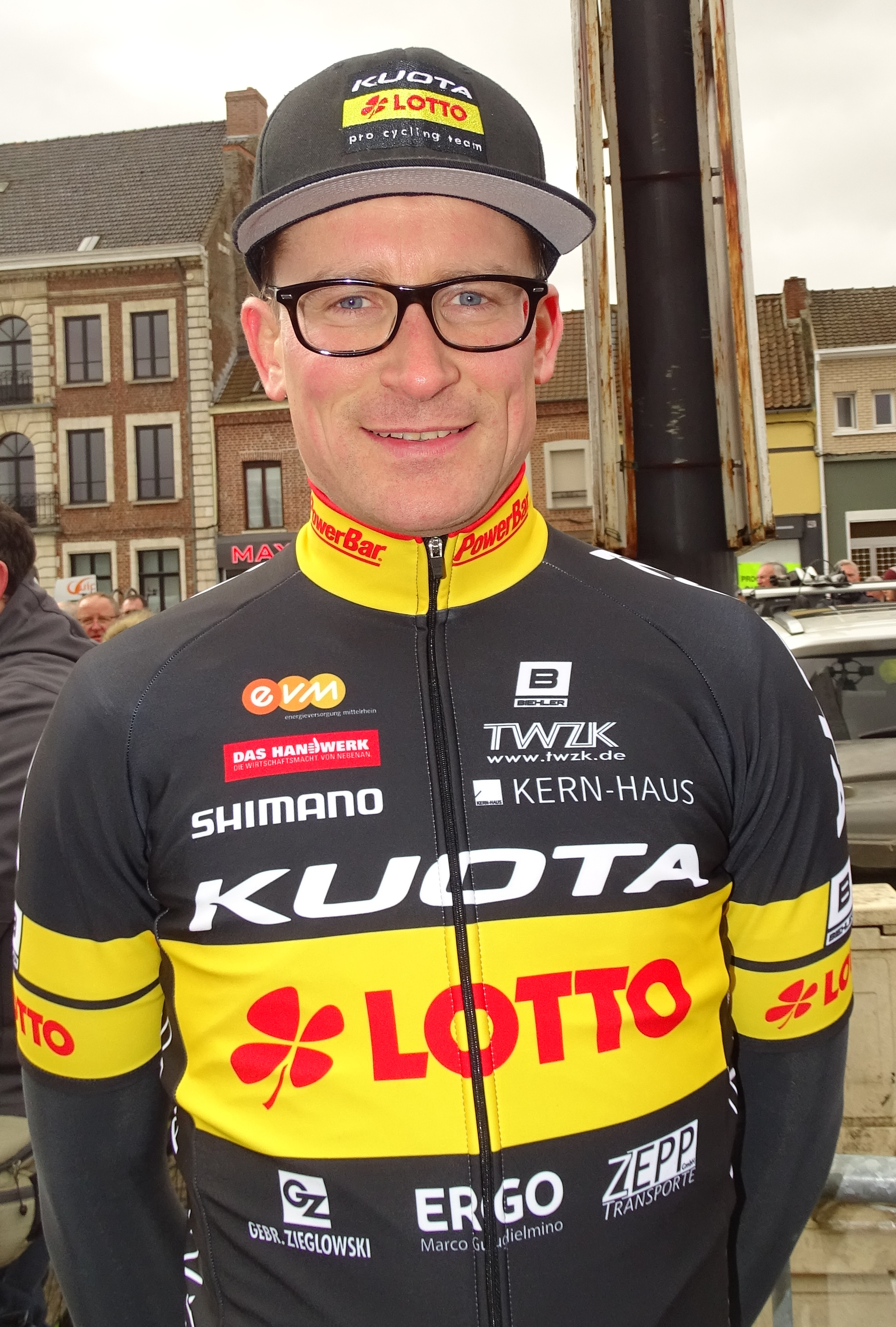
- Retschke in 2016

Personal information
- Full name: Robert Retschke
- Born: December 17, 1980 (age 45) Bernau bei Berlin, East Germany
- Height: 1.8 m (5 ft 11 in)
- Weight: 66 kg (146 lb)

Cycling career
- Sport: Cycling
- Current team: Benotti Berthold
- Discipline: Road
- Role: Rider

Amateur teams
- 2002: Team Wiesenhof (stagiaire)
- 2003: Team Wiesenhof (stagiaire)

Professional teams
- 2003: Team Vermarc Sportswear
- 2004–2005: ComNet–Senges
- 2006–2007: Wiesenhof–AKUD
- 2008: Team Mapei Heizomat
- 2009–2010: Continental Team Differdange
- 2011: Team NetApp
- 2012–2018: Eddy Merckx–Indeland
- 2019–: P&S Metalltechnik

Robert Retschke (born 17 December 1980 in Bernau bei Berlin) is a German cyclist, who currently rides for UCI Continental team Benotti Berthold.

== Major results ==
2003
1st Stage 4 Brandenburg Rundfahrt
2004
6th Rund um die Hainleite
2005
1st National Hill Climb Championships
1st Rund um Düren
9th Rund um Köln
2006
1st National Hill Climb Championships
2nd Rund um die Hainleite
5th GP Triberg-Schwarzwald
7th Grote Prijs Jef Scherens
2007
5th Rund um die Hainleite
6th Overall Regio-Tour
7th Grote Prijs Jef Scherens
9th Rund um die Nurnberger Altstadt
2008
1st Stage 3 Regio-Tour
2nd GP Briek Schotte
4th Sparkassen Giro
2009
1st Grand Prix de la ville de Pérenchies
1st Grand Prix des Marbriers
2nd Grand Prix Cristal Energie
9th Druivenkoers Overijse
2010
1st National Hill Climb Championships
2nd Ronde Pévéloise
4th Grand Prix de la ville de Pérenchies
8th Sparkassen Giro Bochum
8th Rund um Düren
8th Overall Flèche du Sud
