= Markus Eichler =

German professional road bicycle racer

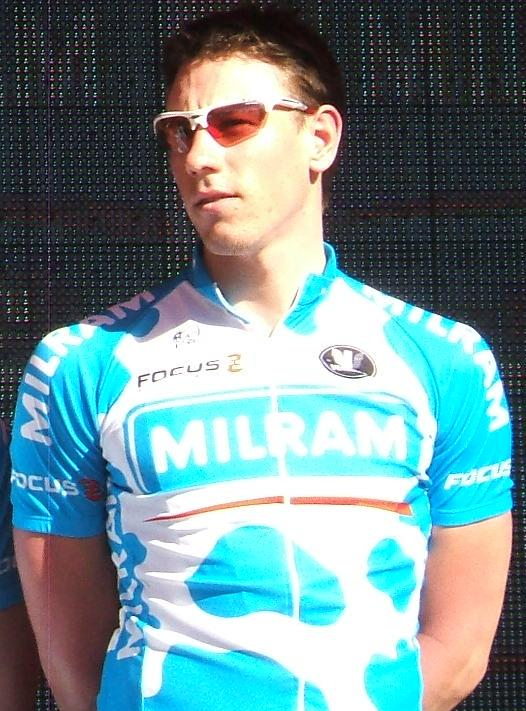

Personal information
- Full name: Markus Eichler
- Born: 18 February 1982 (age 44) Varel, Germany
- Height: 1.85 m (6 ft 1 in)
- Weight: 78 kg (172 lb)

Cycling career
- Sport: Cycling
- Discipline: Road
- Role: Rider

Amateur team
- 2003–2006: ComNet–Senges

Professional teams
- 2007: Unibet.com
- 2008–2010: Team Milram
- 2011: Team NSP
- 2012–2013: Team NetApp
- 2014: Team Stölting

Major wins
- Grand Tours Giro d'Italia Numero Nero classification (2008) Single-Day Races and Classics Ronde van Drenthe (2006)

Markus Eichler (born 18 February 1982) is a German former professional road bicycle racer.

In 2011, he had originally signed with an Australian team called Pegasus, but that team failed to secure a UCI license of any kind, leaving its riders to need to sign elsewhere. Eicheler instead rose for Team NSP.

Eichler left NetApp–Endura at the end of the 2013 season, and joined Team Stölting for the 2014 season.

== Major results ==
2006
1st Ronde van Drenthe
1st GP de Dourges
1st Grand Prix de la Ville de Lillers
1st Rund um den Elm
1st Köln–Schuld–Frechen
3rd Omloop van het Waasland
4th Nokere Koerse
6th Rund um Düren
7th De Vlaamse Pijl
2007
5th Nokere Koerse
8th Overall Three Days of De Panne
10th Halle–Ingooigem
2009
4th Le Samyn
2010
1st Profronde van Fryslan
2011
1st Prologue Flèche du Sud
5th Grote Prijs Stad Zottegem
7th Overall Azerbaijan International Cycling Tour

1st Stage 4

10th Dorpenomloop Rucphen
2013
2nd Ronde van Drenthe
