= Per Christian Münstermann =

German cyclist (born 1999)

Per Münstermann
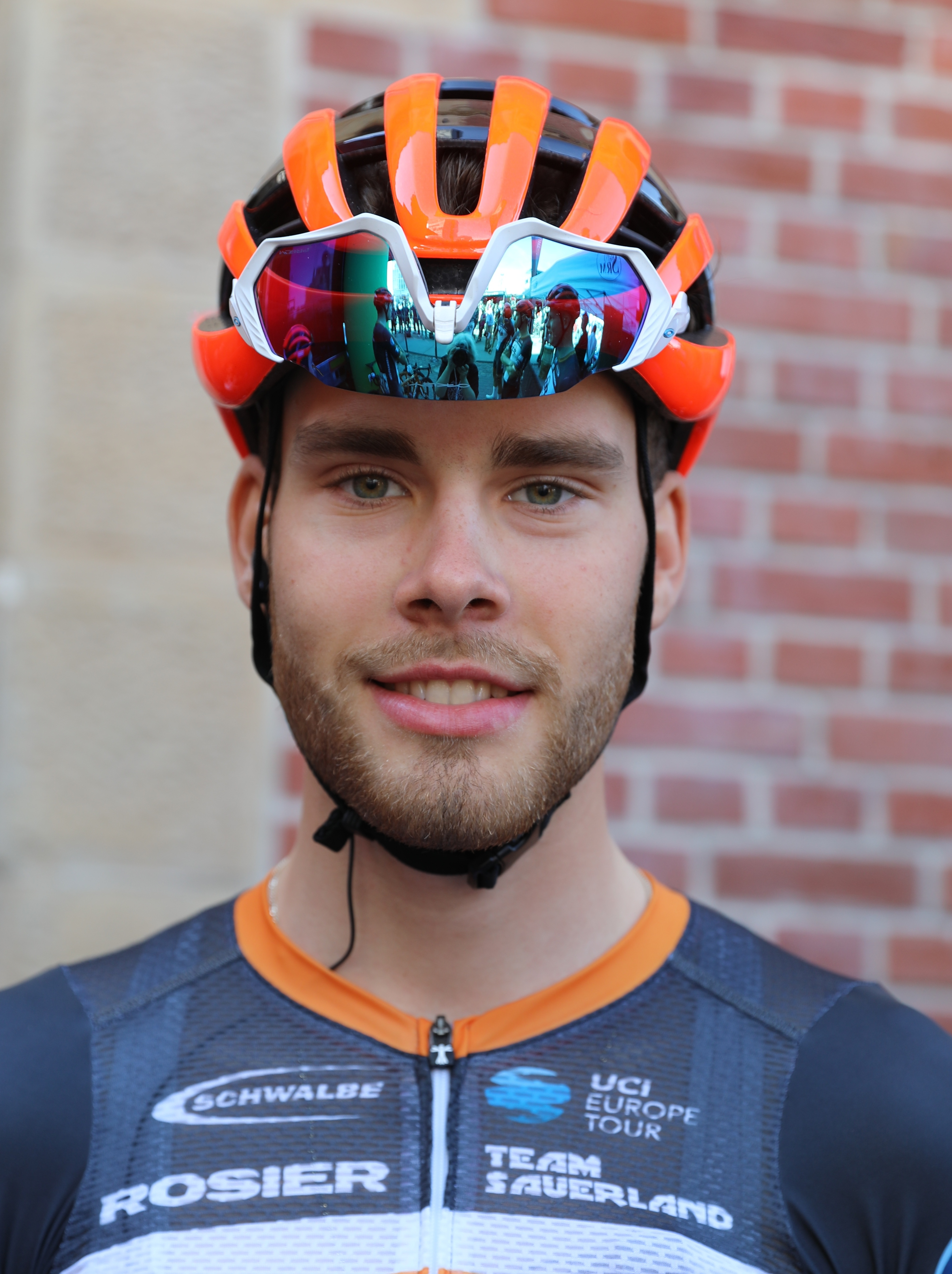
- Per Christian Münstermann (2019)

Personal information
- Full name: Per Christian Münstermann
- Born: 9 February 1999 (age 27) Düren, Germany
- Height: 188 cm (6 ft 2 in)
- Weight: 75 kg (165 lb)

Cycling career
- Sport: Cycling
- Current team: Global 6 United
- Disciplines: Road; Track
- Role: Rider (retired); Directeur sportif
- Rider type: All-rounder

Amateur teams
- 2010: RRC Düren–Merken
- 2011-2017: Radschläger Düsseldorf

Professional team
- 2018–2023: Team Sauerland NRW p/b SKS Germany (Note: Left on 15 February 2023.)

Managerial team
- 2024–: Global 6 United

Per Christian Münstermann (born 9 February 1999) is a German former professional road and track racing cyclist, who now works as a directeur sportif for UCI Continental team Global 6 United.

== Career ==
Athletically, Münstermann started with athletics before switching to cycling in 2010. In 2011 he joined the team SG Radschläger Düsseldorf.

In 2016 he became the German Junior Champion in the omnium in Cottbus, finished second in the points race and third in the individual pursuit. The following year, he won the title in the Madison as well as the National Championship in the team time trial with the Rose Team NRW Junior Team in Genthin. At the Junior Track World Championships the same year, he finished fourth in the Madison with Rico Brückner.

In 2018, Münstermann received a contract with UCI Continental team Team Sauerland NRW p/b SKS Germany. In the same year, he finished eighth at the German National Road Race Championships as part of the Three Countries Championship in the U23 road race.

== Awards ==
In 2017, Münstermann was honored as Düsseldorf's "Junior Sportsman of the Year". Also in 2017, he was awarded the "Golden Lion" as Sportsman of the Year in his native town of Düren.

== Major results ==
=== Track ===
2016
National Junior Championships

1st Omnium
2nd Points race
3rd Individual pursuit
3rd Team pursuit

2017
National Junior Championships

1st Madison (with Nils Weispfennig)
2nd Team pursuit
3rd Individual pursuit

2022
3rd Team pursuit, National Championships

=== Road ===
2016
1st Team time trial, National Junior Championships
2017
1st Team time trial, National Junior Championships
2020
9th International Rhodes Grand Prix
2021
1st Team time trial, National Championships
1st 30. Spee Cup Genthin
2022
1st GP Flahaut
