= Anders Skaarseth =

Norwegian road cyclist

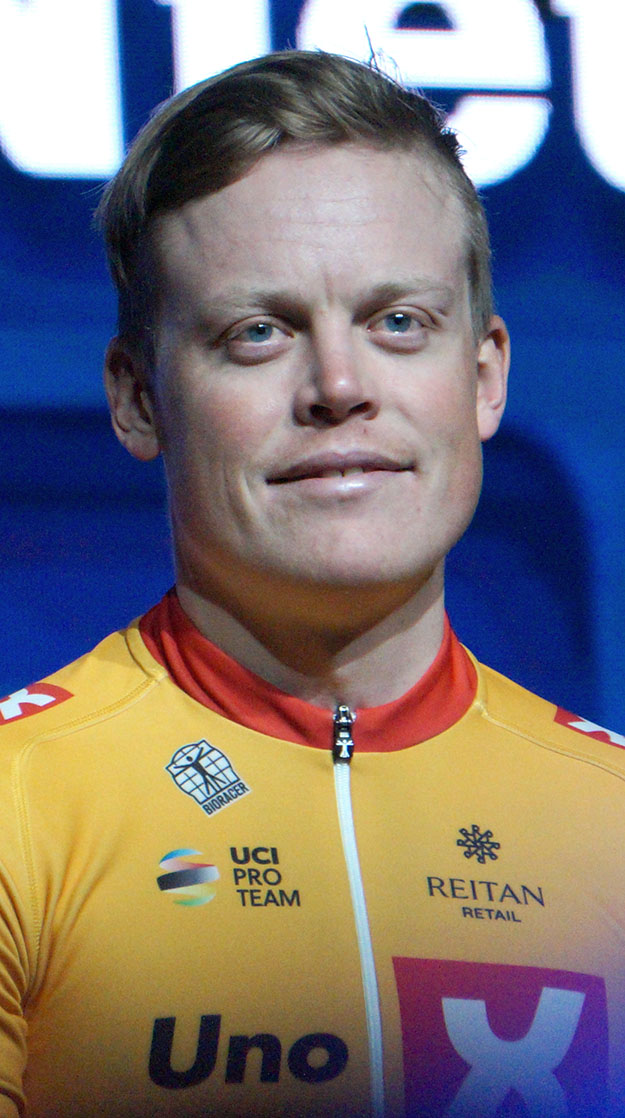
- Skaarseth in 2023

Personal information
- Full name: Anders Skaarseth
- Born: 7 May 1995 (age 31) Lillehammer, Norway

Cycling career
- Sport: Cycling
- Current team: Uno-X Mobility
- Discipline: Road
- Role: Rider

Amateur teams
- 2014: Lillehammer CK
- 2014: Team Joker (stagiaire)

Professional teams
- 2015–2017: Team Joker
- 2018–: Uno-X Norwegian Development Team
- 2018: Cofidis (stagiaire)

Major wins
- One-day races and Classics National Road Race Championships (2026)

Anders Skaarseth (born 7 May 1995) is a Norwegian cyclist, who currently rides for UCI ProTeam Uno-X Mobility.

His brother Iver is also a professional cyclist on the same team.

== Major results ==
2015
3rd Road race, National Under-23 Road Championships
5th Road race, National Road Championships
7th Ronde van Vlaanderen Beloften
10th Overall Course de la Paix U23
2016
1st Stage 1 (TTT) ZLM Tour
2nd Ghent–Wevelgem U23
4th Road race, National Under-23 Road Championships
8th Overall Tour de Bretagne
2017
1st Road race, National Under-23 Road Championships
2nd Overall Tour de Bretagne

1st Points classification
1st Young rider classification

2nd Grote Prijs Marcel Kint
5th Ronde van Vlaanderen Beloften
8th Ringerike GP
9th Paris–Troyes
10th Road race, UCI Road World Under-23 Championships
2018
4th Omloop Het Nieuwsblad Beloften
5th Lillehammer GP
6th Overall International Tour of Rhodes
8th Himmerland Rundt
8th Skive–Løbet
10th International Rhodes Grand Prix
2019
5th Road race, National Road Championships
6th Overall Oberösterreich Rundfahrt

1st Points classification
1st Stage 3

6th Overall Tour of Norway
8th Skive–Løbet
9th Lillehammer GP
10th International Rhodes Grand Prix
2021
2nd Road race, National Road Championships
2026 (1 pro win)
1st Road race, National Road Championships
