= Iver Skaarseth =

Norwegian road cyclist

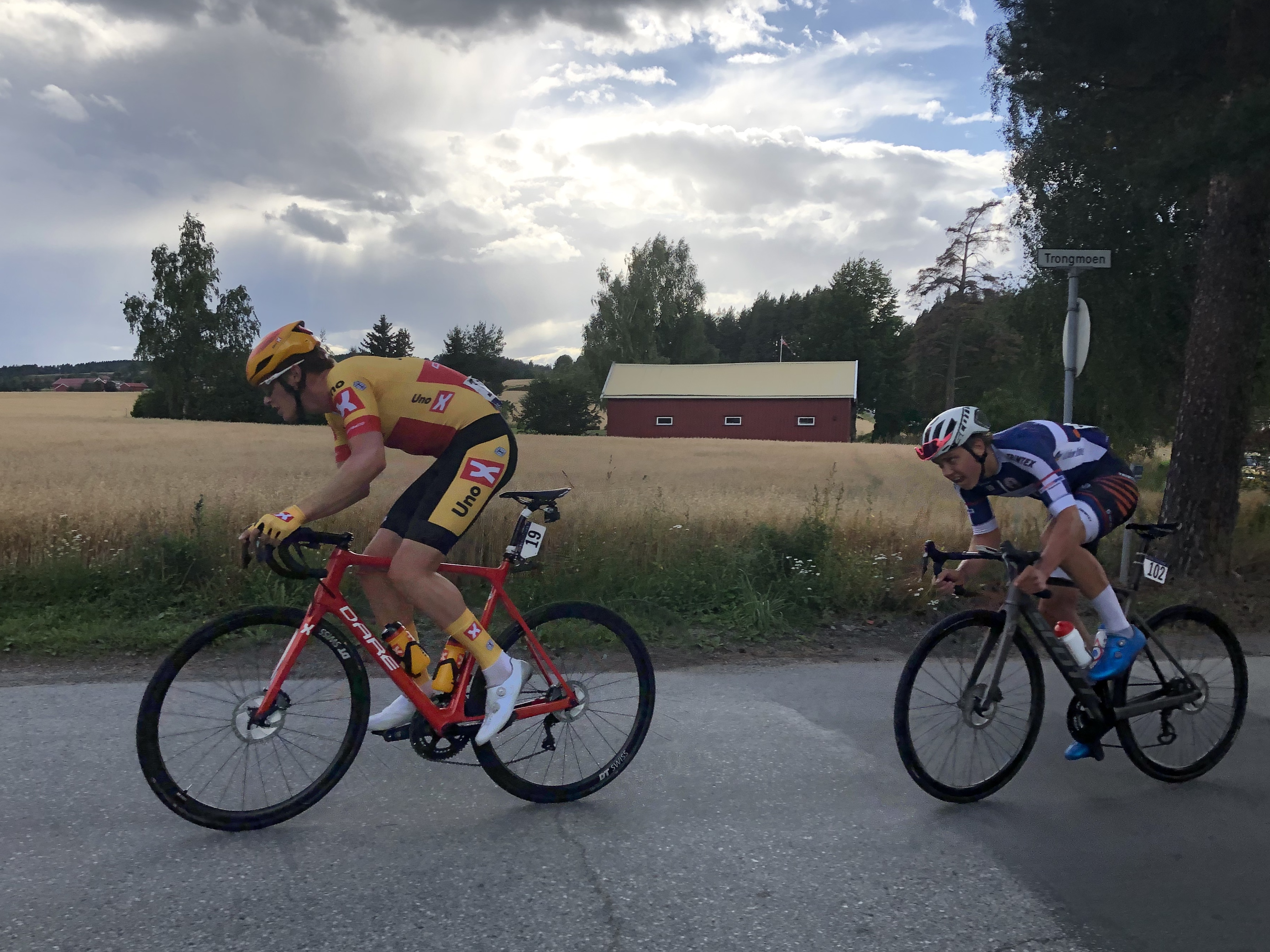
- Skaarseth in 2020

Personal information
- Born: 15 March 1998 (age 28) Lillehammer, Norway

Cycling career
- Sport: Cycling
- Current team: Above & Beyond Cancer Cycling p/b Bike World
- Discipline: Road
- Role: Rider

Amateur teams
- 2017: Lillehammer CK
- 2023–: Above & Beyond Cancer Cycling p/b Bike World

Professional team
- 2018–2022: Uno-X Norwegian Development Team

Iver Skaarseth (born 15 March 1998) is a Norwegian cyclist, who currently rides for amateur team Above & Beyond Cancer Cycling p/b Bike World.

His brother Anders is also a professional cyclist.

== Major results ==
2018
2nd Road race, National Under-23 Road Championships
2020
8th Overall International Tour of Rhodes
