= Syver Wærsted =

Norwegian cyclist

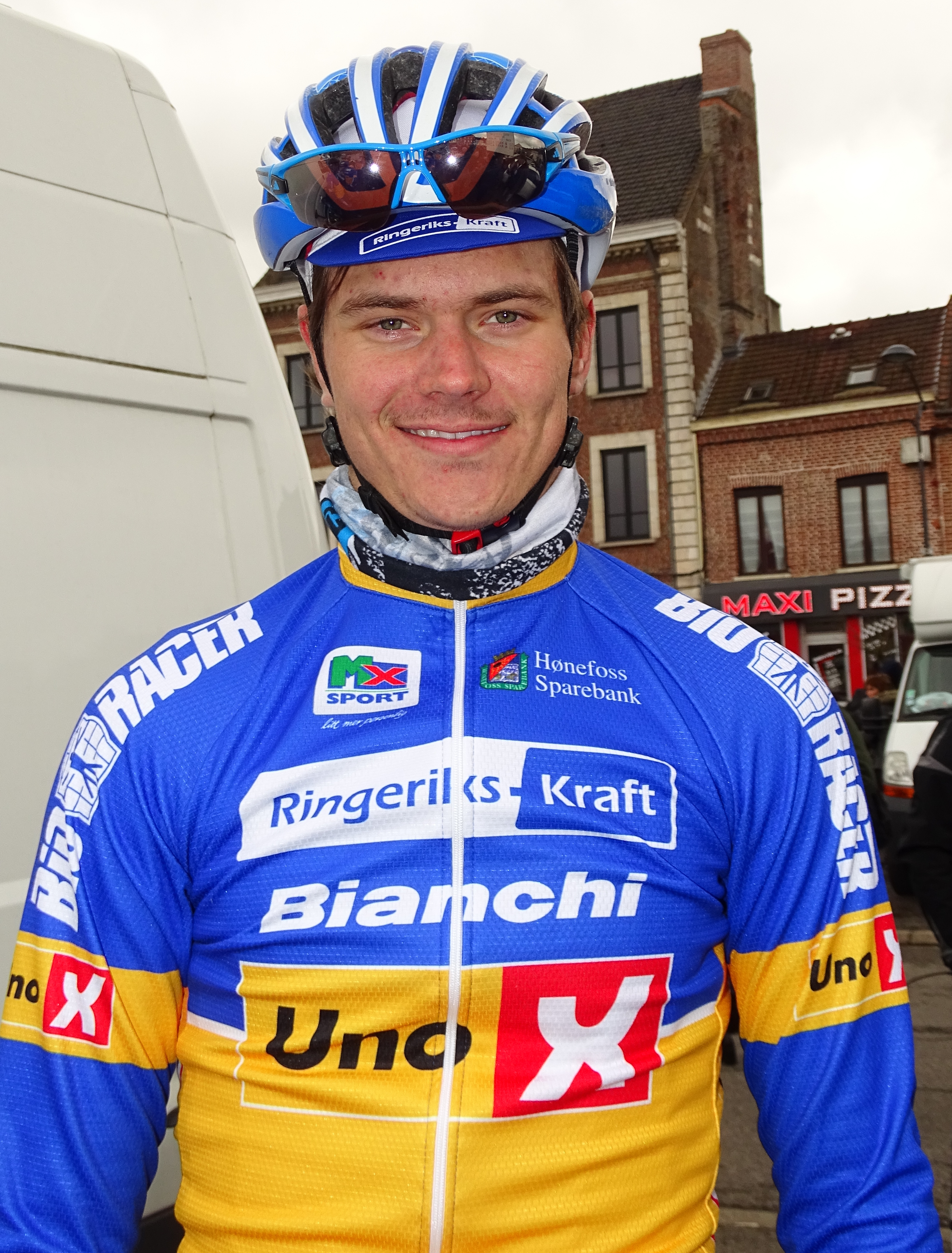
- Wærsted in 2016

Personal information
- Full name: Syver Wærsted
- Born: 8 August 1996 (age 30) Skien, Norway
- Height: 192 cm (6 ft 4 in)

Cycling career
- Sport: Cycling
- Current team: Retired
- Discipline: Road
- Role: Rider

Amateur team
- 2015: Team Ringeriks–Kraft (stagiaire)

Professional team
- 2016–2022: Team Ringeriks–Kraft

Syver Wærsted (born 8 August 1996) is a Norwegian former cyclist, who competed as a professional from 2016 to 2022 for UCI ProTeam Uno-X Pro Cycling Team.

== Major results ==
2016
1st Scandinavian Race Uppsala
2017
3rd Fyen Rundt
7th Ruota d'Oro
2018
1st Ringerike GP
3rd Overall International Tour of Rhodes

1st Stage 3

3rd Road race, National Under–23 Road Championships
6th Grand Prix de la ville de Pérenchies
2020
4th Overall Course de Solidarność et des Champions Olympiques
