= Grand Prix de Dourges =

Race details
- Date: July
- Region: Pas-de-Calais, France
- Discipline: Road race
- Competition: UCI Europe Tour
- Type: One day race

History
- First edition: 1987
- Editions: 21
- Final edition: 2007
- First winner: Jean-François Laffillé (FRA)
- Most wins: Francis Moreau (FRA) (2 wins)
- Final winner: Martin Mortensen (DEN)

The Grand Prix de Dourges was a single-day road bicycle race held annually in France from 1987 to 2007. It was organized as a 1.2 event on the UCI Europe Tour from 2005 to 2007, and was also known as the Prix Fréquence-Nord, GP du Nord-Pas de Calais Open and the Grand Prix de Dourges-Hénin-Beaumont over the years. The race was replaced by the Ronde Pévéloise first held in 2010.

== Winners ==
Year	Winner	Second	Third
Prix Fréquence-Nord
1987	(France) Jean-François Laffillé		
1988	(France) Laurent Pillon	(France) Francis Moreau	(France) Laurent Eudeline
1989	(France) Francis Moreau	(United Kingdom) Brian Smith	(Denmark) Henning Sindahl
1990	(France) Francis Moreau	(Poland) Czesław Rajch	(Netherlands) Raymond Meijs
1991	(Poland) Czeslaw Rajch	(Sweden) Hans Kindberg	(France) Xavier Jan
1992	(France) Frédéric Moncassin	(Germany) Marcel Wust	(Estonia) Jaan Kirsipuu
GP du Nord-Pas de Calais Open
1993	(France) Jean-Luc Masdupuy	(Belgium) Jan Mattheus	(France) Cyril Saugrain
1994	(Belgium) Ludo Dierckxsens	(Belgium) Daniel Verelst	(Belgium) Paul Van Hyfte
1995	(France) Christophe Agnolutto	(France) Stéphane Barthe	(Belgium) Franky De Buyst
1996	(Estonia) Jaan Kirsipuu	(Belgium) Filip Meirhaeghe	(France) Nicolas Jalabert
1997	(France) Stéphane Barthe	(Netherlands) Christian van Dartel	(Japan) Ken Hashikawa
1998	(Belgium) Marc Streel	(Belgium) Hans De Meester	(Netherlands) Jürgen de Jong
Grand Prix de Dourges
1999	(France) Jean-Michel Thilloy	(France) Jean-Claude Thilloy	(Lithuania) Saulius Ruskys
2000	(New Zealand) Gordon McCauley	(Belgium) Rik Claeys	(Belgium) Nico Ruyloft
2001	(Poland) Marek Leśniewski	(Netherlands) Angelo van Melis	(France) Cédric Deruyter
2002	(Belgium) Steven Caethoven	(France) Geoffroy Lequatre	(France) Kilian Patour
2003	(Netherlands) Roy Curvers	(France) Raphael Devienne	(France) Pierre Drancourt
2004	(France) Gaylor Bouchart	(France) Stéphane Petilleau	(Belgium) Koen Das
2005	(Poland) Grzegorz Kwiatkowski	(Uzbekistan) Sergey Krushevskiy	(Netherlands) Bjorn Hoeben
Grand Prix de Dourges-Hénin-Beaumont
2006	(Germany) Markus Eichler	(Australia) Joel Pearson	(France) Sebastien Six
2007	(Denmark) Martin Mortensen	(Republic of Ireland) Mark Cassidy	(Netherlands) Luc Hagenaars
