= Marco Maronese =

Italian cyclist

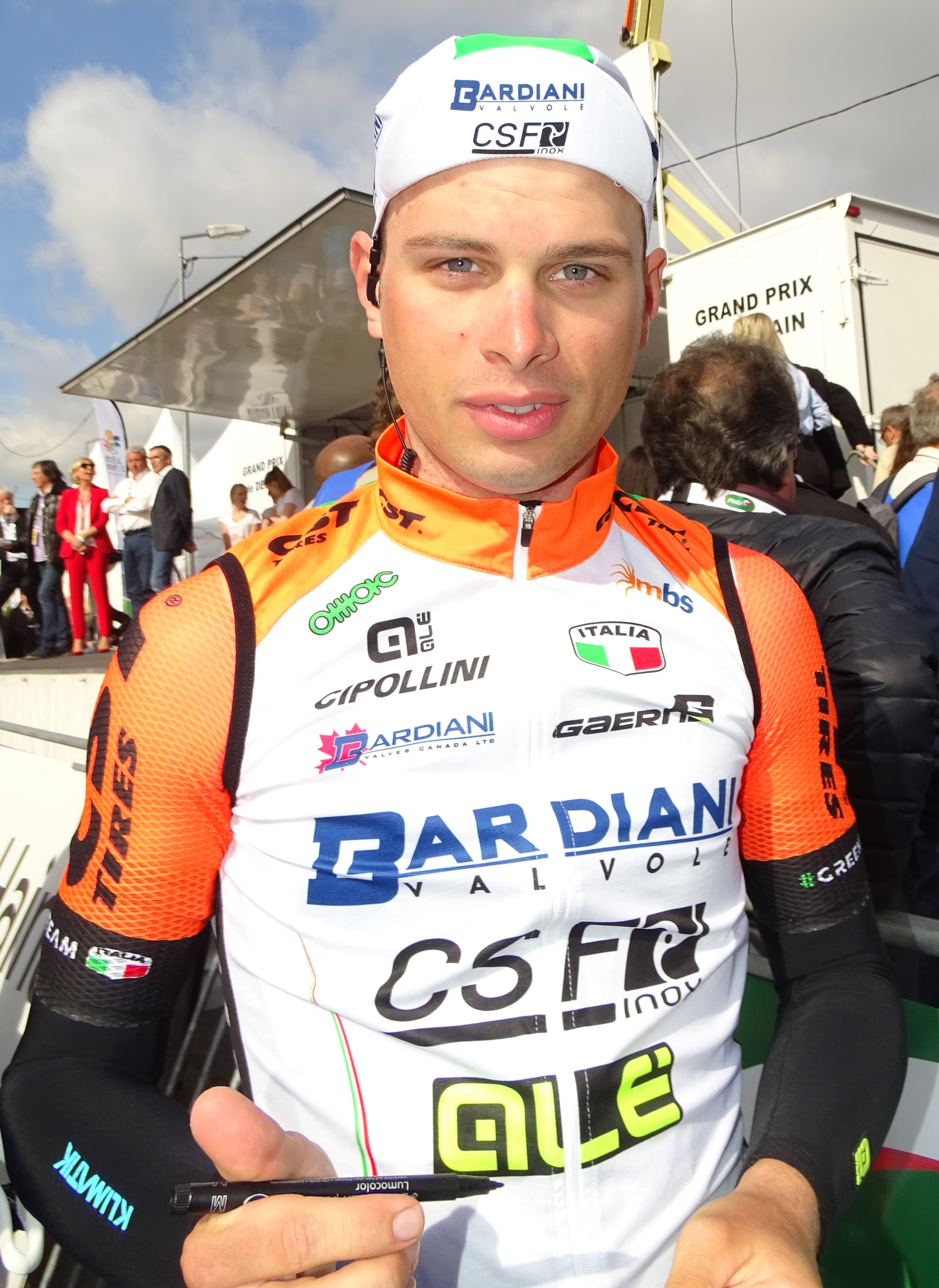
- Maronese in 2017.

Personal information
- Full name: Marco Maronese
- Born: 25 December 1994 (age 31) Motta di Livenza, Italy

Cycling career
- Sport: Cycling
- Discipline: Road
- Role: Rider
- Rider type: Sprinter

Amateur teams
- 2013: Food Italia Mg K Vis Norda
- 2014: Delio Gallina Colosio Eurofeed
- 2015–2016: Zalf–Euromobil–Désirée–Fior

Professional team
- 2017–2019: Bardiani–CSF

Marco Maronese (born 25 December 1994) is an Italian cyclist, who last rode for UCI Professional Continental team Bardiani–CSF.

== Major results ==
2015
7th Circuito del Porto
2016
1st Circuito del Porto
2018
2nd International Rhodes Grand Prix
2019
5th Poreč Trophy
