= Benotti Berthold =

German cycling team

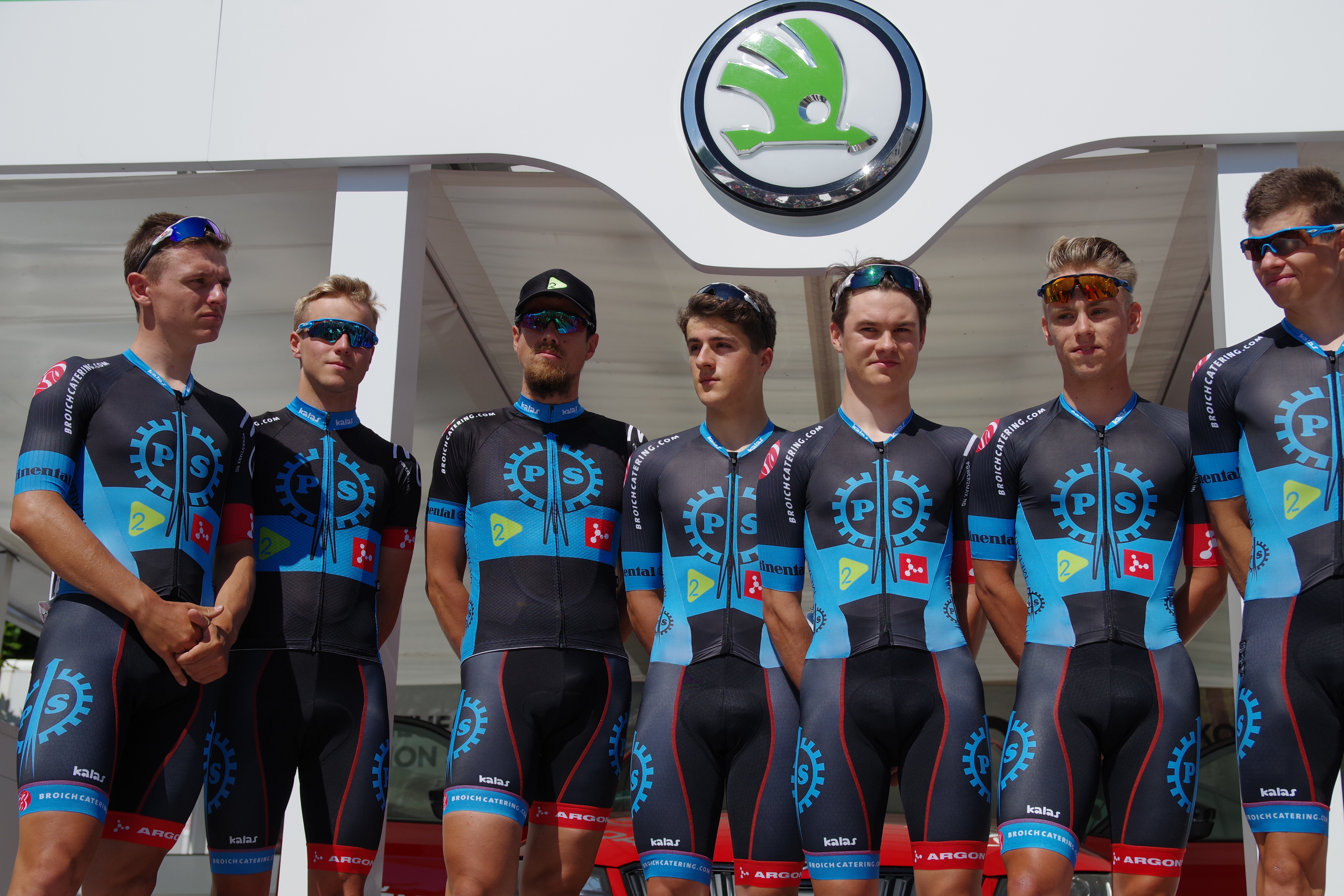

Team information
- UCI code: BUB
- Registered: Germany
- Founded: 2017
- Discipline: Road
- Status: Amateur (2017–2018); UCI Continental (2019–)

Key personnel
- General manager: Lars Wackernagel
- Team manager: Jörn Meyn

Team name history
- 2017–2018 2019–2021 2022–2024 2025–: P&S Team Thüringen; P&S Metalltechnik; P&S Benotti; Benotti Berthold

Benotti Berthold (UCI team code: BUB) is a German UCI Continental cycling team founded in 2017 as an amateur team, before upgrading to Continental in 2019.

== Team roster ==
As of 21 February 2021.

Rider	Date of birth
Michel Aschenbrenner (GER)	7 November 1999 (age 26)
Robert Jägeler (GER)	18 April 1996 (age 30)
Tom Lindner (GER)	29 August 2001 (age 25)
John Mandrysch (GER)	18 October 1996 (age 29)
Yannik Niebergall (GER)	22 March 2002 (age 24)
Tobias Nolde (GER)	9 December 1998 (age 27)

Rider	Date of birth
Tim Oelke (GER)	4 January 2001 (age 25)
Robert Retschke (GER)	17 December 1980 (age 45)
Dominik Röber (GER)	12 October 1999 (age 26)
Immanuel Stark (GER)	10 October 1994 (age 31)
Luke Wilk (GER)	16 December 2001 (age 24)

== Major wins ==
2019
Puchar Uzdrowisk Karpackich, John Mandrysch
2020
Stage 2 Course de Solidarność et des Champions Olympiques, Michel Aschenbrenner
2021
Overall In the footsteps of the Romans, Immanuel Stark

Young rider classification, Michel Aschenbrenner
Stage 1, Immanuel Stark
