= Rembe–Rad-Net Pro Cycling Team =

German cycling team

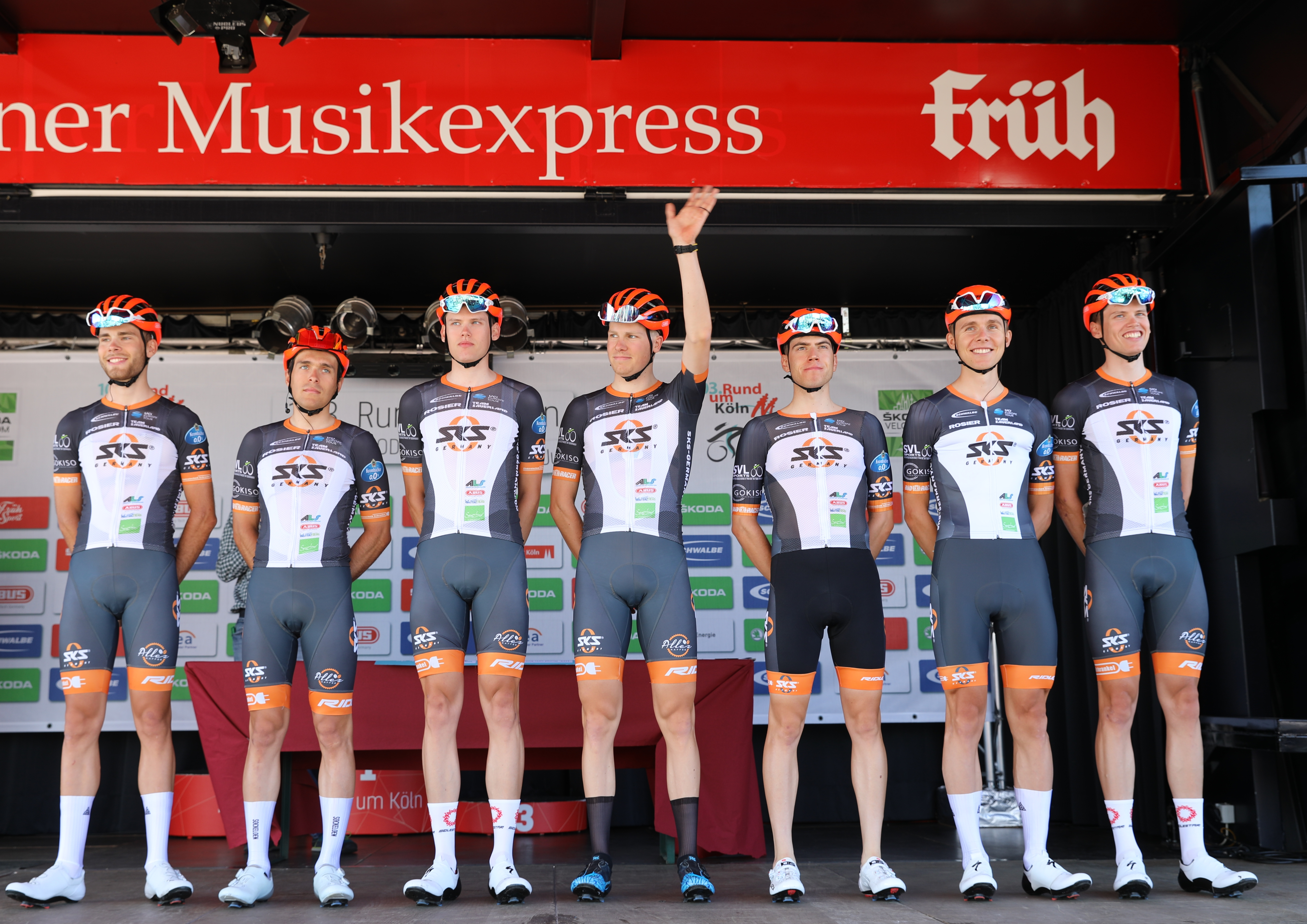

Team information
- UCI code: SVL
- Registered: Germany
- Founded: 2016
- Discipline: Road
- Status: UCI Continental

Key personnel
- General manager: Heiko Volkert
- Team managers: Wolfgang Oschwald; Lennart Bechheim; Rafael Hennes; Markus Mooser; Jörg Scherf; Sven Schrankel

Team name history
- 2016–2017 2018–2019 2020–2021 2022–2023 2024 2025–: Team Sauerland NRW p/b Henley & Partners; Team Sauerland NRW p/b SKS Germany; Team SKS Sauerland NRW; Saris Rouvy Sauerland Team; Rembe Pro Cycling Team Sauerland; Rembe–Rad-Net Pro Cycling Team

Rembe–Rad-Net Pro Cycling Team is a UCI Continental team founded in 2016 and based in North Rhine-Westphalia, Germany. It participates in UCI Continental Circuits races.

== Team roster ==
As of 28 February 2021.

Rider	Date of birth
Johannes Adamietz (GER)	24 May 1998 (age 28)
Julian Borresch (GER)	19 March 2002 (age 24)
Julian Braun (GER)	27 September 1995 (age 30)
Maximilian Eißer (GER)	29 August 2002 (age 24)
Michel Gießelmann (GER)	17 February 1999 (age 27)
Johannes Hodapp (GER)	9 September 1999 (age 26)
Jon Knolle (GER)	11 September 1999 (age 26)
Lars Kulbe (GER)	8 March 2000 (age 26)

Rider	Date of birth
Per Münstermann (GER)	9 February 1999 (age 27)
Tim Neffgen (GER)	1 April 2002 (age 24)
Abram Stockman (BEL)	31 July 1996 (age 30)
Michiel Stockman (BEL)	31 July 1996 (age 30)
Ole Theiler (GER)	8 October 2002 (age 23)
