= Team Lotto–Kern Haus =

German cycling team

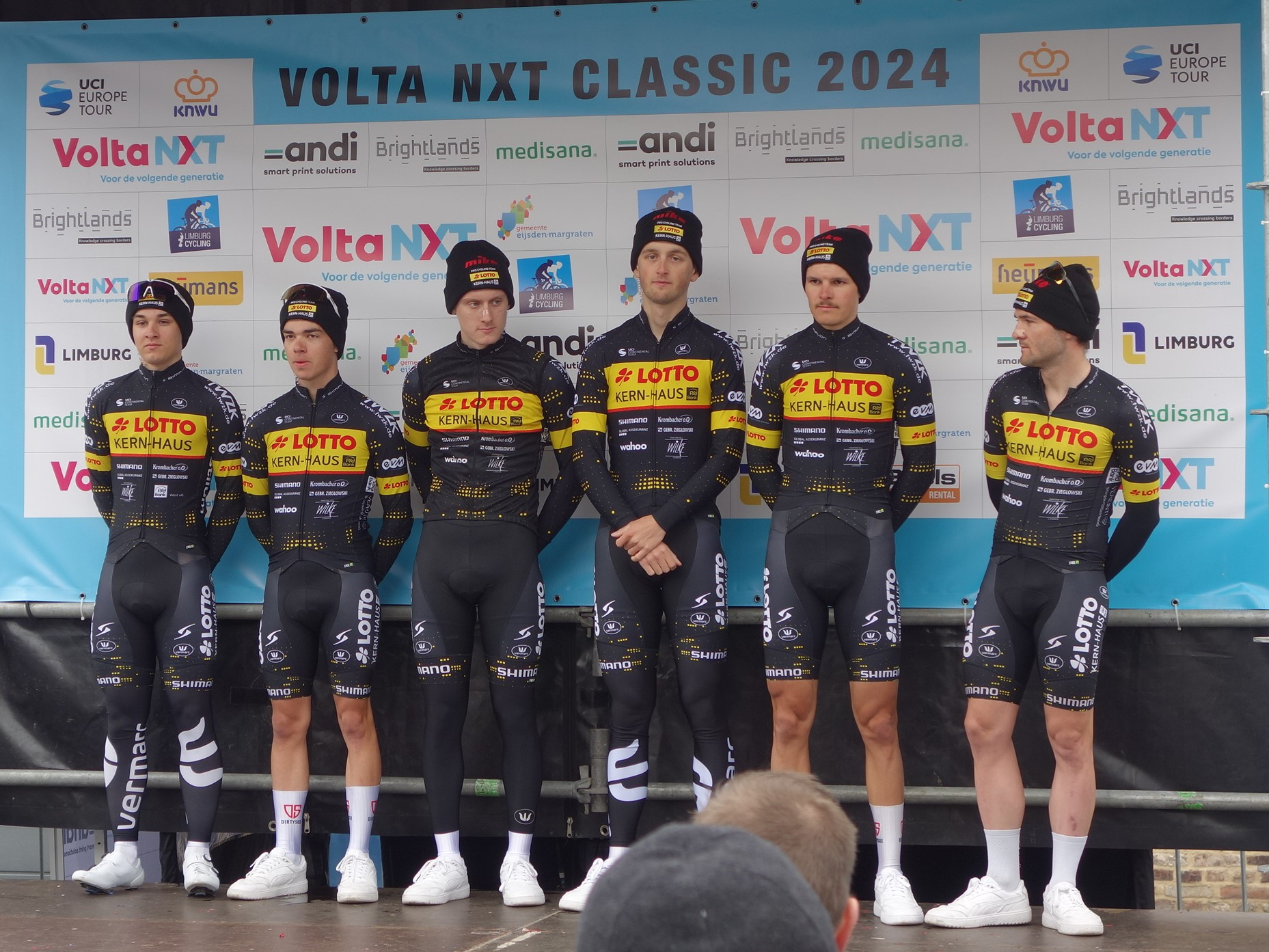
- Riders on the team in 2024

Team information
- UCI code: LKH
- Registered: Germany
- Founded: 2002
- Discipline: Road
- Status: UCI Continental
- Website: Team home page

Key personnel
- General manager: Florian Monreal
- Team managers: André Benoit; Markus Felsing; Christian Henn; Andreas Stauff; Hartmut Täumler

Team name history
- 2002–2005 2006–2007 2008 2009–2010 2011–2012 2013 2014–2016 2017–: ComNet–Senges; Regiostrom–Senges; Kuota–Senges; Kuota–Indeland; Eddy Merckx–Indeland; Quantec–Indeland; Team Kuota; Team Lotto–Kern Haus

Team Lotto–Kern Haus (UCI team code: LKH) is a Continental cycling team founded in 2002 from the fusion between ComNet Cycle and Athleticum–Principia. It is based in Germany and it participates in UCI Continental Circuits races.

== Team roster ==
As of 27 February 2021.

Rider	Date of birth
Klaus Betzinger (GER)	25 September 2002 (age 23)
Leon Brescher (GER)	11 April 2001 (age 25)
Moritz Czasa (GER)	3 June 2002 (age 24)
Luca Dreßler (GER)	8 January 2002 (age 24)
Kim Heiduk (GER)	3 March 2000 (age 26)
Jan Hugger (GER)	10 July 1998 (age 28)

Rider	Date of birth
Joshua Huppertz (GER)	10 November 1994 (age 31)
Pierre-Pascal Keup (GER)	14 January 2001 (age 25)
Christian Koch (GER)	29 October 1996 (age 29)
Jan Kuhn (GER)	28 January 2000 (age 26)
Mario Spengler (SUI)	22 August 1997 (age 29)
Alexander Tarlton (GER)	6 October 2000 (age 25)

== Major wins ==
2002
Stage 4 Tour of Japan, Stefan Ganser
2003
Stage 3 Giro del Capo, Luke Roberts
Stage 5 Ringerike GP, Luke Roberts
2004
Stage 5b Tour de Normandie, Luke Roberts
Stage 2 FBD Milk Ras, Stefan Cohnen
Stage 1 Rheinland-Pfalz Rundfahrt, Luke Roberts
2005
Rund um Düren, Robert Retschke
Overall Flèche du Sud, Wolfram Wiese

Stages 1 & 3b, Wolfram Wiese

Stages 3 & 5 Tour de Hokkaido, Tilo Schüler
2006
GP de la Ville de Lillers, Markus Eichler
Ronde van Drenthe, Markus Eichler
Rund um Düren, Elnathan Heizmann
Stage 1 OZ Wielerweekend, Wolfram Wiese
Rund um den Elm, Markus Eichler
GP de Dourges-Hénin-Beaumont, Markus Eichler
2007
Stage 4 Rheinland-Pfalz Rundfahrt, Björn Glasner
Stage 3 Tour of Thailand, Matthias Bertling
Stage 5 Tour of Thailand, Malaya van Ruitenbeek
2008
Stage 3 Giro del Capo, Luke Roberts
Stage 4 Flèche du Sud, Malaya van Ruitenbeek
Stage 4 Tour des Pyrénées, Malaya van Ruitenbeek
Stage 5 Tour of Thailand, Björn Glasner
2009
Rund um Düren, Dennis Pohl
Stages 3 & 4 Thüringen Rundfahrt der U23, Andreas Stauff
Stage 1 Tour des Pyrénées, Dennis Pohl
2011
Eschborn–Frankfurt City Loop U23, Patrick Bercz
2015
Stage 4 Tour de Berlin, Max Walscheid
Stage 2 Tour de Gironde, Marcel Meisen
Stage 3 Oberösterreich Rundfahrt, Marcel Meisen
Kernen Omloop Echt-Susteren, Max Walscheid
2016
Chrono Champenois, Daniel Westmattelmann
Stage 2 Flèche du Sud, Raphael Freienstein
2018
Arno Wallaard Memorial, Joshua Huppertz
Stage 1 Bałtyk–Karkonosze Tour, Fabian Schormair
2021
Stage 1 International Tour of Rhodes, Christian Koch
Stage 1 Tour d'Eure-et-Loir, Kim Heiduk
Stage 1 Czech Cycling Tour, Joshua Huppertz
2022
Stage 1 South Aegean Tour, Luca Dreßler
