= Dauner–Akkon =

German cycling team

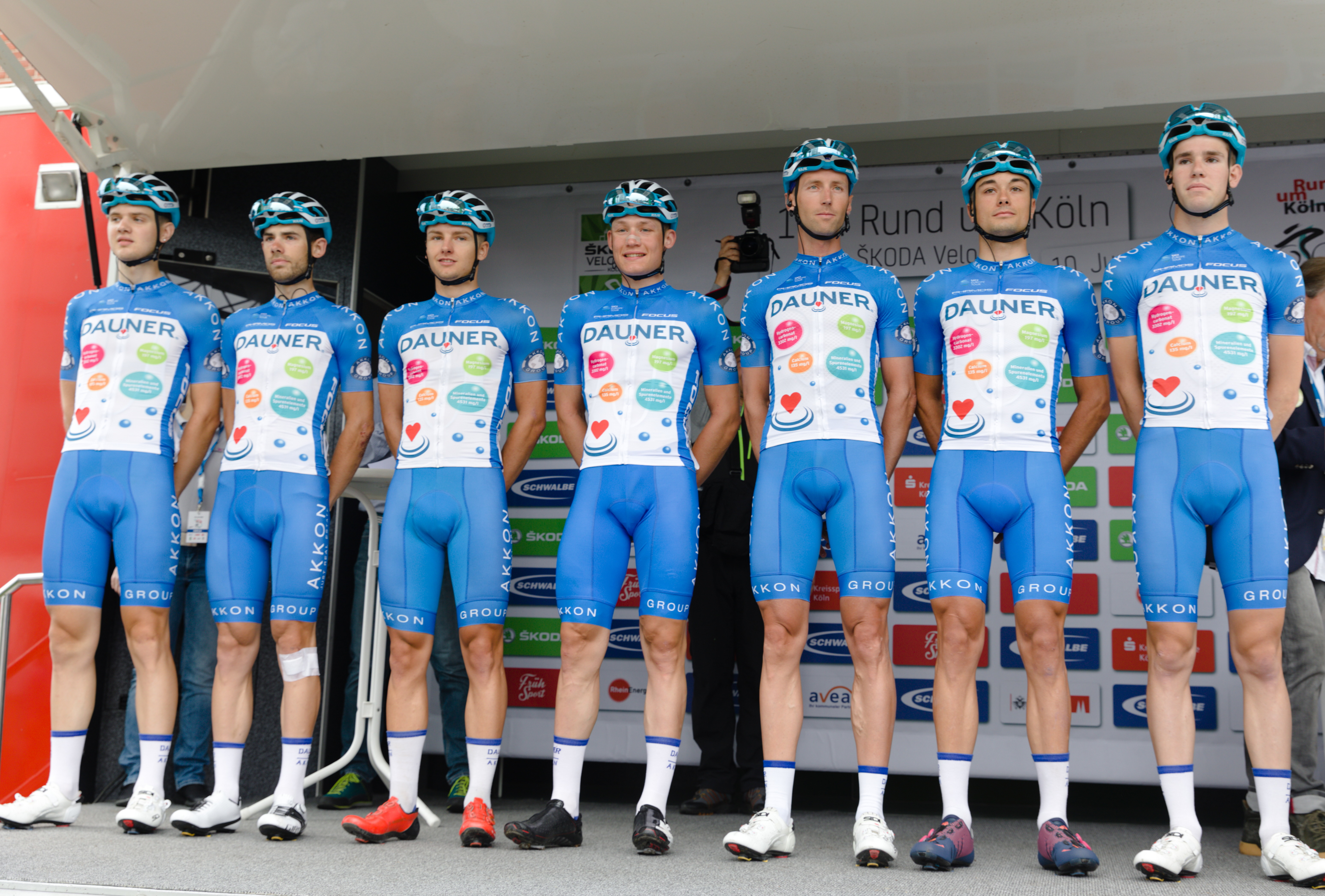

Team information
- UCI code: TDA
- Registered: Germany
- Founded: 2017
- Discipline: Road
- Status: UCI Continental

Key personnel
- General manager: Philipp Mamos
- Team managers: Gerald Ciolek; Jochen Hahn; Christoph Kronenberg; Marco Müller-Sciacca

Team name history
- 2017–2018 2019–: Dauner D&DQ–Akkon; Dauner–Akkon

Team Dauner–Akkon is a German UCI Continental team founded in 2017.

== Team roster ==
As of 9 March 2021.

Rider	Date of birth
Dominik Bauer (GER)	4 December 1997 (age 28)
Henning Bommel (GER)	23 February 1983 (age 43)
Roman Duckert (GER)	12 January 2002 (age 24)
Albert Gathemann (GER)	3 November 2001 (age 24)
Jonas Messerschmidt (GER)	10 February 2001 (age 25)
Moritz Plambeck (GER)	18 November 2001 (age 24)

Rider	Date of birth
Frederik Rassmann (GER)	9 March 2000 (age 26)
Sven Redmann (GER)	26 May 2001 (age 25)
Kilian Steigner (GER)	16 June 2000 (age 26)
Kieron Steinmann (GER)	3 May 2002 (age 24)
Jan-Marc Temmen (GER)	16 August 2002 (age 24)
Sven Thurau (GER)	11 November 1996 (age 29)
