= Joshua Huppertz =

German cyclist (born 1994)

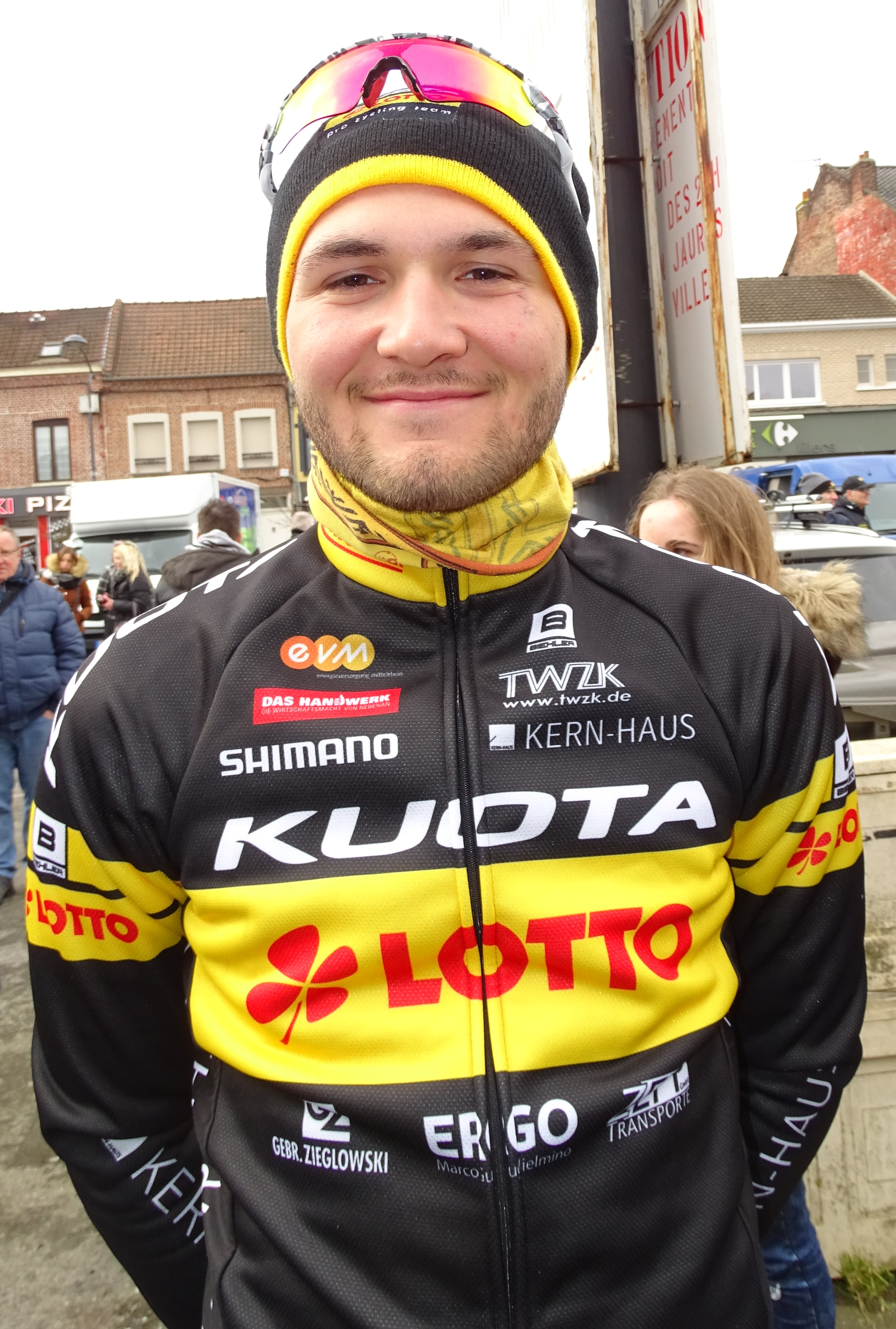
- Huppertz in 2016

Personal information
- Full name: Joshua Huppertz
- Born: 10 November 1994 (age 31) Aachen, Germany
- Height: 1.74 m (5 ft 9 in)
- Weight: 66 kg (146 lb)

Cycling career
- Sport: Cycling
- Current team: Team Lotto–Kern Haus Outlet Montabaur
- Discipline: Road
- Role: Rider

Amateur teams
- 2005–2008: RV Staubwolke 09 Fischeln
- 2010–2011: RSV Staubwolke Krefeld
- 2011–2014: Rose Team NRW
- 2012–2014: RV Komet Delia 09 Köln
- 2014: Team Kuota (stagiaire)

Professional team
- 2015–: Team Kuota–Lotto

Joshua Huppertz (born 10 November 1994) is a German cyclist, who currently rides for UCI Continental team Team Lotto–Kern Haus Outlet Montabaur.

== Major results ==
2017
3rd International Rhodes Grand Prix
6th Slag om Norg
2018
1st Arno Wallaard Memorial
1st USPE Road Race
1st USPE Time Trial
3rd International Rhodes Grand Prix
7th PWZ Zuidenveld Tour
2019
5th Overall Tour de Normandie
2021
1st Stage 1 Czech Cycling Tour
2022
7th Route Adélie
8th Visit Friesland Elfsteden Race
10th Overall Tour du Loir-et-Cher
