= List of wins by Team MTN and its successors =

This is a comprehensive list of victories of the Team Qhubeka NextHash cycling team. The races are categorized according to the UCI Continental Circuits rules.

== 2008 Team MTN ==
Overall Tour d'Egypte, Jay Robert Thomson

Stage 1 & 2, Jay Robert Thomson

Stage 5 Giro del Capo, David George
South Africa, Road Race Championships, Ian McLeod
Stage 3, 5 & 8 Tour du Maroc, Malcolm Lange
Stage 9 Tour du Maroc, Nicholas White
Amashovashova Classic, Malcolm Lange

== 2010 MTN–Energade ==
South Africa Road Race Championships, Christoff Van Heerden
South Africa Time Trial Championships, Kevin Evans
Rwanda Road Race Championships, Adrien Niyonshuti

== 2011 MTN–Qhubeka ==
South Africa Time Trial Championships, Daryl Impey
Stage 2 Tour du Maroc, Reinardt Janse van Rensburg
Stages 3 & 9 Tour du Maroc, Arran Brown
Stage 7 Tour du Maroc, Daryl Impey
Namibia Road Race Championships, Lotto Petrus
Namibia Time Trial Championships, Lotto Petrus
Rwanda Road Race Championships, Adrien Niyonshuti
Stage 2 Herald Sun Tour, Reinardt Janse van Rensburg

== 2012 MTN–Qhubeka ==
South Africa Time Trial Championships, Reinardt Janse van Rensburg
Namibia Road Race Championships, Lotto Petrus
Namibia Time Trial Championships, Lotto Petrus
Overall Tour du Maroc, Reinardt Janse van Rensburg

Stages 1, 5, 6 & 8, Reinardt Janse van Rensburg
Stages 3, 4, 9 & 10, Arran Brown

Overall Tour de Bretagne, Reinardt Janse van Rensburg

Stage 4, Reinardt Janse van Rensburg

Overall Ronde van Overijssel, Reinardt Janse van Rensburg

Prologue, Reinardt Janse van Rensburg

Circuit de Wallonie, Reinardt Janse van Rensburg
Overall Tour of Eritrea, Jacques Janse van Rensburg

Stages 1 & 4, Jani Tewelde
Stage 2, Jacques Janse van Rensburg

Ronde van Zeeland Seaports, Reinardt Janse van Rensburg
Prologue & Stage 10 Volta a Portugal, Reinardt Janse van Rensburg

== 2013 MTN–Qhubeka ==
South Africa Road Race Championships, Jay Thomson
Lithuania Time Trial Championships, Ignatas Konovalovas
South Africa U23 Road Race Championships, Louis Meintjes
South Africa U23 Time Trial Championships, Louis Meintjes
Stage 2 Driedaagse van West-Vlaanderen, Gerald Ciolek
Milan – San Remo, Gerald Ciolek
Stage 5 Tour de Taiwan, Tsgabu Grmay
Stage 3 Bayern-Rundfahrt, Gerald Ciolek
Stage 1 Tour de Korea, Kristian Sbaragli
Stage 5 Tour de Korea, Team time trial
Stage 6 Tour of Austria, Gerald Ciolek
Stage 4 Volta a Portugal, Sergio Pardilla
Stage 2 Tour of Britain, Gerald Ciolek
Teams classification UCI Africa Tour
Stage 1 Tour of Rwanda, Jay Thomson
Stage 3 Tour of Rwanda, Louis Meintjes
Stage 4 Tour of Rwanda, Johann Van Zyl

== 2014 MTN–Qhubeka ==
South Africa Road Race Championships, Louis Meintjes
South Africa U23 Road Race Championships, Louis Meintjes
South Africa U23 Time Trial Championships, Louis Meintjes
Stage 4 La Tropicale Amissa Bongo, Ferekalsi Debesay
Stage 3 Vuelta a Andalucía, Gerald Ciolek
Overall Mzansi Tour, Jacques Janse van Rensburg

Stage 1, Jacques Janse van Rensburg
Stage 2, Louis Meintjes

Stage 3 Tour d'Azerbaïdjan, Youcef Reguigui
Stage 4 Tour d'Azerbaïdjan, Linus Gerdemann
Ethiopia Time Trial Championships, Tsgabu Grmay
Ethiopia Road Race Championships, Tsgabu Grmay

== 2015 MTN–Qhubeka ==
Trofeo Andratx-Mirador d'Es Colomer, Steve Cummings
South Africa Road Race Championships, Jacques Janse van Rensburg
African Continental Championships (Road Race), Louis Meintjes
Overall, Tour de Langkawi, Youcef Reguigui

Stage 7, Youcef Reguigui

Overall, Settimana Internazionale di Coppi e Bartali, Louis Meintjes

Stage 4, Louis Meintjes

Stage 5 Tour des Fjords, Edvald Boasson Hagen
Stage 4 Ster ZLM Toer, Matt Brammeier
Norway Time Trial Championships, Edvald Boasson Hagen
Eritrea Time Trial Championships, Daniel Teklehaimanot
Eritrea Road Race Championships, Natnael Berhane
Norway Road Race Championships, Edvald Boasson Hagen
Stage 5 Tour of Austria, Johann van Zyl
Stage 14 Tour de France, Steve Cummings
Stage 2 Danmark Rundt, Edvald Boasson Hagen
Stage 10 Vuelta a España, Kristian Sbaragli
Overall, Tour of Britain, Edvald Boasson Hagen
Stage 1 Tour de Chlef, Youcef Reguigui

== 2016 Team Dimension Data for Qhubeka ==
Overall Tour of Qatar, Mark Cavendish

Stage 1, Mark Cavendish
Stage 3, Edvald Boasson Hagen

South Africa Road Race Championships, Jaco Venter
Stages 2 & 5 Tour of Oman, Edvald Boasson Hagen
Overall Tour de Langkawi, Reinardt Janse van Rensburg
Stage 4 Tirreno–Adriatico, Steve Cummings
Stage 3 Tour of the Basque Country, Steve Cummings
Stage 2 Tour of Croatia, Mark Cavendish
Stages 4 & 5 Tour of Norway, Edvald Boasson Hagen
Stage 8 Tour of California, Mark Cavendish
Stage 4 Critérium du Dauphiné, Edvald Boasson Hagen
Stage 7 Critérium du Dauphiné, Steve Cummings
Belarus Time Trial Championships, Kanstantsin Siutsou
Norway Time Trial Championships, Edvald Boasson Hagen
Eritrea Time Trial Championships, Daniel Teklehaimanot
Rwanda Time Trial Championships, Adrien Niyonshuti
Eritrea Road Race Championships, Daniel Teklehaimanot
Belarus Road Race Championships, Kanstantsin Siutsou
Norway Road Race Championships, Edvald Boasson Hagen
Tour de France

Stages 1, 3, 6 & 14, Mark Cavendish
Stage 7, Steve Cummings

Stage 4 Vuelta a Burgos, Nathan Haas
Mountains classification Vuelta a España, Omar Fraile
Overall Tour of Britain, Steve Cummings
Stage 7 Eneco Tour, Edvald Boasson Hagen
Stages 2 & 4 Abu Dhabi Tour, Mark Cavendish

== 2017 Team Dimension Data for Qhubeka ==
South Africa Road Race Championships, Reinardt Janse van Rensburg
Stage 1 Abu Dhabi Tour, Mark Cavendish
Overall Tour de Langkawi, Ryan Gibbons

Stage 4, Mekseb Debesay
Stage 5, Ryan Gibbons

Overall Tour de Yorkshire, Serge Pauwels

Stage 3, Serge Pauwels

Stage 11 Giro d'Italia, Omar Fraile
Overall Tour of Norway, Edvald Boasson Hagen

Stages 1 & 5, Edvald Boasson Hagen

Overall Tour des Fjords, Edvald Boasson Hagen

Stages 3, 4, & 5, Edvald Boasson Hagen

Norway Time Trial Championships, Edvald Boasson Hagen
Great Britain Time Trial Championships, Steve Cummings
Eritrea Time Trial Championships, Mekseb Debesay
Rwanda Time Trial Championships, Adrien Niyonshuti
Great Britain Road Race Championships, Steve Cummings
Stage 5 Tour of Austria, Ben O'Connor
Stage 19 Tour de France, Edvald Boasson Hagen
Algeria Road Race Championships, Youcef Reguigui

== 2018 Team Dimension Data for Qhubeka ==
African Continental Championships (Time Trial), Mekseb Debesay
African Continental Championships (Road Race), Amanuel Gebrezgabihier
Stage 3 Dubai Tour, Mark Cavendish
Stage 3 Tour of the Alps, Ben O'Connor
Stage 2 Tour of Norway, Edvald Boasson Hagen
Norway Time Trial Championships, Edvald Boasson Hagen
Eritrea Road Race Championships, Merhawi Kudus
Stages 4 & 9 Vuelta a España, Ben King

== 2019 Team Dimension Data for Qhubeka ==
Stage 1 (ITT) Volta a la Comunitat Valenciana, Edvald Boasson Hagen
Stage 6 Tour of Oman, Giacomo Nizzolo
African Continental Championships, Time Trial, Stefan de Bod
Stage 3 Tour of Norway, Edvald Boasson Hagen
Stage 1 Critérium du Dauphiné, Edvald Boasson Hagen
Stage 5 Tour of Slovenia, Giacomo Nizzolo
Eritrea National Time Trial Championships, Amanuel Ghebreigzabhier
Stage 1 Vuelta a Burgos, Giacomo Nizzolo
Time trial, African Games, Ryan Gibbons

== 2020 NTT Pro Cycling ==
Stage 5 Tour Down Under, Giacomo Nizzolo
Stage 4 Étoile de Bessèges, Ben O'Connor
Stages 3 & 8 Tour de Langkawi, Max Walscheid
South Africa Road Race Championships, Ryan Gibbons
Stage 2 Paris–Nice, Giacomo Nizzolo
Italy Road Race Championships, Giacomo Nizzolo
UEC European Road Championships, Giacomo Nizzolo
Stage 17 Giro d'Italia, Ben O'Connor

== 2021 Team Qhubeka Assos ==
Clásica de Almería, Giacomo Nizzolo
Stage 11 Giro d'Italia, Mauro Schmid
Stage 13 Giro d'Italia, Giacomo Nizzolo
Stage 15 Giro d'Italia, Victor Campenaerts
Circuito de Getxo, Giacomo Nizzolo

== Supplementary statistics ==
Grand Tours by highest finishing position
Race	2013	2014	2015	2016	2017	2018	2019	2020	2021
Giro d'Italia	–	–	–	10	36	44	32	11	57
Tour de France	–	–	13	42	19	59	16	73	21
Vuelta a España	–	17	10	38	35	24	25	20	51
Major week-long stage races by highest finishing position
Race	2013	2014	2015	2016	2017	2018	2019	2020	2021
Tour Down Under	–	–	–	12	4	3	11	26	NH
Paris–Nice	–	–	–	48	57	34	52	24	19
Tirreno–Adriatico	37	90	6	17	30	17	27	12	28
Volta a Catalunya	–	–	–	21	42	11	93	NH	73
Tour of the Basque Country	–	–	–	19	28	22	42	NH	24
Giro del Trentino	23	5	8	–	–	7	–	NH	16
Tour de Romandie	–	–	–	17	23	26	34	NH	51
Critérium du Dauphiné	–	–	47	35	41	22	43	40	26
Tour de Suisse	–	12	–	18	15	25	22	NH	6
Tour de Pologne	–	–	–	60	20	25	37	54	42
Eneco Tour	–	–	–	12	27	39	10	16	3
Monument races by highest finishing position
Race	2013	2014	2015	2016	2017	2018	2019	2020	2021
Milan–San Remo	1	9	10	26	19	16	20	5	18
Tour of Flanders	–	29	58	23	16	19	32	21	13
Paris–Roubaix	–	–	54	5	36	34	45	NH	12
Liège–Bastogne–Liège	–	58	11	19	25	30	43	38	32
Giro di Lombardia	52	–	–	27	83	70	25	79	30
Classics by highest finishing position
Classic	2013	2014	2015	2016	2017	2018	2019	2020	2021
Omloop Het Nieuwsblad	11	27	27	–	–	13	45	21	30
Kuurne–Brussels–Kuurne	—	–	8	–	–	9	DNF	2	13
Strade Bianche	–	32	–	–	10	25	20	9	6
E3 Harelbeke	–	18	19	82	30	24	39	NH	19
Gent–Wevelgem	–	17	25	18	29	15	56	28	2
Amstel Gold Race	–	–	20	33	4	26	18	NH	30
La Flèche Wallonne	–	74	39	24	28	12	10	30	28
Clásica de San Sebastián	–	–	–	27	27	14	17	NH	69
Paris–Tours	17	7	39	6	56	34	–	–	–
