= 2015 MTN–Qhubeka season =

MTN-Qhubeka
- 2015 season
- UCI code: MTN
- Status: UCI Professional Continental
- UCI Africa Tour ranking: ongoing
- Manager: Douglas Ryder; Brian Smith (July–)
- Main sponsor(s): MTN & Qhubeka
- Based: South Africa
- Bicycles: Cervélo
- Groupset: ?

Season victories
- One-day races: 1
- Stage race overall: 3
- Stage race stages: 8
- National Championships: 5

The 2015 season for the MTN–Qhubeka cycling team began in January at the Trofeo Santanyi-Ses Salines-Campos. The team participated in UCI Continental Circuits and UCI World Tour events when given a wildcard invitation.

== Team roster ==
As of 15 January 2015.

Rider	Date of birth
Natnael Berhane (ERI)	5 January 1991 (aged 24)
Edvald Boasson Hagen (NOR)	17 May 1987 (aged 27)
Theo Bos (NED)	22 August 1983 (aged 31)
Matt Brammeier (IRL)	7 June 1985 (aged 29)
Gerald Ciolek (GER)	19 September 1986 (aged 28)
Steve Cummings (GBR)	19 March 1981 (aged 33)
Nicolas Dougall (RSA)	21 November 1992 (aged 22)
Tyler Farrar (USA)	2 June 1984 (aged 30)
Matthew Goss (AUS)	5 November 1986 (aged 28)
Jacques Janse van Rensburg (RSA)	6 September 1987 (aged 27)
Reinardt Janse van Rensburg (RSA)	3 February 1989 (aged 25)
Songezo Jim (RSA)	17 September 1990 (aged 24)

Rider	Date of birth
Jayde Julius (Note: Julius joined the team on 1 August as a stagiaire.) (RSA)	17 August 1993 (aged 21)
Merhawi Kudus (ERI)	23 January 1994 (aged 20)
Louis Meintjes (RSA)	21 February 1992 (aged 22)
Adrien Niyonshuti (RWA)	2 February 1987 (aged 27)
Serge Pauwels (BEL)	21 November 1983 (aged 31)
Youcef Reguigui (ALG)	9 January 1990 (aged 25)
Kristian Sbaragli (ITA)	8 May 1990 (aged 24)
Andreas Stauff (GER)	22 January 1987 (aged 27)
Daniel Teklehaymanot (ERI)	10 November 1988 (aged 26)
Jay Thomson (RSA)	12 April 1986 (aged 28)
Johann Van Zyl (RSA)	2 February 1991 (aged 23)
Jaco Venter (RSA)	13 February 1987 (aged 27)

Riders who joined the team for the 2015 season

Rider	2014 team
Natnael Berhane	Team Europcar
Edvald Boasson Hagen	Team Sky
Theo Bos	Belkin Pro Cycling
Matt Brammeier	Synergy Baku Cycling Project
Steve Cummings	BMC Racing Team
Tyler Farrar	Garmin–Sharp
Matthew Goss	Orica–GreenEDGE
Reinardt Janse van Rensburg	Giant–Shimano
Serge Pauwels	Omega Pharma–Quick-Step

Riders who left the team during or after the 2014 season

Rider	2015 team
John-Lee Augustyn	Retired
Freqalsi Debesay Abrha	
Tsgabu Grmay	Lampre–Merida
Linus Gerdemann	Cult Energy Pro Cycling
Ignatas Konovalovas	Marseille 13-KTM
Sergio Pardilla	Caja Rural–Seguros RGA
Bradley Potgieter	Europcar South Africa
Martin Reimer	LKT Team Brandenburg
Meran Russom Alem	
Jani Tewelde Weldegaber	
Dennis van Niekerk	
Martin Wesemann	

== Season victories ==
Date	Race	Competition	Rider	Country	Location
30 January	Trofeo Andratx – Mirador d’Es Colomer	UCI Europe Tour	Steve Cummings (GBR)	Spain	Mirador d'Es Colomer
22 February	Tour of Oman, Young rider classification	UCI Asia Tour	Louis Meintjes (RSA)	Oman	
14 March	Tour de Langkawi, Stage 7	UCI Asia Tour	Youcef Reguigui (ALG)	Malaysia	Fraser's Hill
15 March	Tour de Langkawi, Overall	UCI Asia Tour	Youcef Reguigui (ALG)	Malaysia	
29 March	Settimana Internazionale di Coppi e Bartali, Stage 4	UCI Europe Tour	Louis Meintjes (RSA)	Italy	Roccapelago
29 March	Settimana Internazionale di Coppi e Bartali, Overall	UCI Europe Tour	Louis Meintjes (RSA)	Italy	
10 April	Circuit de la Sarthe, Mountains classification	UCI Europe Tour	Louis Meintjes (RSA)	France	
24 April	Giro del Trentino, Young rider classification	UCI Europe Tour	Louis Meintjes (RSA)	Italy	
31 May	Tour des Fjords, Stage 5	UCI Europe Tour	Edvald Boasson Hagen (NOR)	Norway	Stavanger
14 June	Critérium du Dauphiné, Mountains classification	UCI World Tour	Daniel Teklehaimanot (ERI)	France	
21 June	Ster ZLM Toer, Stage 4	UCI Europe Tour	Matt Brammeier (IRL)	Netherlands	Boxtel
9 July	Tour of Austria, Stage 5	UCI Europe Tour	Johann van Zyl (RSA)	Austria	Matrei in Osttirol
18 July	Tour de France, Stage 14	UCI World Tour	Steve Cummings (GBR)	France	Mende
5 August	Danmark Rundt, Stage 2	UCI Europe Tour	Edvald Boasson Hagen (NOR)	Denmark	Aarhus
31 August	Vuelta a España, Stage 10	UCI World Tour	Kristian Sbaragli (ITA)	Spain	Castellón de la Plana
13 September	Tour of Britain, Overall	UCI Europe Tour	Edvald Boasson Hagen (NOR)	United Kingdom	

== National, Continental and World champions 2015 ==
Date	Discipline	Jersey	Rider	Country	Location
7 February	South African National Road Race Champion		Jacques Janse van Rensburg (RSA)	South Africa	Mbombela
25 June	Norwegian National Time Trial Champion		Edvald Boasson Hagen (NOR)	Norway	Brumunddal
26 June	Eritrea National Time Trial Champion		Daniel Teklehaimanot (ERI)	Eritrea	Asmara
28 June	Eritrea National Road Race Champion		Natnael Berhane (ERI)	Eritrea	Asmara
28 June	Norwegian National Road Race Champion		Edvald Boasson Hagen (NOR)	Norway	Lillehammer
