= Midvaal Fast One Cycle Challenge =

The Midvaal Fast One Cycle Challenge, also called Hyper to Hyper is a single day road cycling race held in South Africa.

The Midvaal Fast One Cycle Challenge consists of 3 routes: 97km, 50km and 28km. The routes extend through low traffic, and lacks complete road closure. As a result, 10 service clubs act as marshals along the routes.

== History ==
The Pick ‘n Pay Hyper to Hyper Cycle Race was first organized in January 1995 by Nigel Southern, an employee at Bedworthpark Hypermarket, and a small committee consisting of members of the Riverside Pedal Pals Cycling Club and staff at the Bedworthpark Hypermarket. Nigel Southern staged the race in honor of a friend who was killed by a vehicle.

The track was a 100 kilometer route starting from the Steeldale Hypermarket in Alberton and finishing at the Bedworthpark Hypermarket in Vanderbijlpark (hence the name, Hyper to Hyper). After the first race, it was decided that the event would be community oriented. Funds raised from the event would be donated to local charities.

In 1997, the Riverside Rotary Club was invited to assist in entry administration and marshaling.

In 2000, the Riverside Rotary Club gathered other nearby rotary clubs to assist with marshaling various sectors around the route.

In 2013, the race was renamed to the Value Logistics Fast One. It was renamed again in 2019 to the Midvaal Fast One Cycle Challenge, which, as of December 22 2022, remains the current name.

== Past winners ==
=== Men ===
Year	Country	Rider	Team
2004	South Africa	Malcolm Lange	
2005	South Africa	Malcolm Lange	
2006	South Africa	Dean Edwards	
2007	South Africa	Malcolm Lange	Team MTN
2008	South Africa	Jay Thomson	Team MTN
2009	South Africa	Herman Fouche	Team Neotel
2010	South Africa	Jacques Fullard	Focus Vets Team
2011	South Africa	Johannes Kachelhofer	Team Bonitas
