= 2015 94.7 Cycle Challenge =

Race details
- Dates: 15 November 2015
- Stages: 1
- Distance: 97.5 km (60.58 mi)
- Winning time: 2h 34' 01"

Results
	Winner	Ashleigh Moolman (RSA)	(Bigla Pro Cycling Team)
	Second	Sabrina Stultiens (NED)	(Team Liv–Plantur)
	Third	Floortje Mackaij (NED)	(Team Liv–Plantur)

The 2015 94.7 Cycle Challenge was held on 15 November 2015, in South Africa over 97.5-kilometre (60.6 mi). It was the 15th time the race was held for women, but the first time that the race was classified as an international women's race (UCI category 1.1). The race was won by Ashleigh Moolman (Bigla Pro Cycling Team), almost a minute ahead of Sabrina Stultiens (Team Liv–Plantur) and Floortje Mackaij (Team Liv–Plantur).

== Results ==
Result
Rank	Rider	Team	Time
1	Ashleigh Moolman (RSA)	Bigla Pro Cycling Team	2h 45' 14"
2	Sabrina Stultiens (NED)	Team Liv–Plantur	+ 57"
3	Floortje Mackaij (NED)	Team Liv–Plantur	+ 1' 03"
4	Tsega Beyene (ETH)		+ 1' 04"
5	Irene Steyn (NAM)		+ 1' 04"
6	Anriette Schoeman (RSA)		+ 1' 04"
7	Carla Oberholzer (RSA)		+ 1' 04"
8	An-li Kachelhoffer (RSA)		+ 1' 04"
9	Hadnet Kidane (ETH)		+ 1' 04"
10	Doris Schweizer (SUI)	Bigla Pro Cycling Team	+ 1' 06"
Source: ProCyclingStats

== See also ==
- 2015 in women's road cycling
