= Christoff Van Heerden =

South African cyclist

Personal information
- Born: 13 January 1985 (age 41) Benoni, South Africa

Cycling career
- Sport: Cycling
- Current team: Retired
- Discipline: Road
- Role: Rider

Professional teams
- 2007–2008: Team Konica Minolta
- 2009–2011: MTN Cycling

Christoff Van Heerden (born 13 January 1985) is a South African former professional racing cyclist. In 2010 he won the South African National Road Race Championships.

== Major results ==
2006
1st Powerade Dome 2 Dome Cycling Spectacular
1st Stage 5 Tour of Mauritius
2007
1st Amashova National Classic
3rd Memorial Philippe Van Coningsloo
8th Tour du Jura
2008
1st Overall Tour of Hong Kong Shanghai

1st Stages 1 & 6 (ITT) & 6

2nd Overall Tour of Pennsylvania
2nd Intaka Tech Worlds View Challenge 4
3rd Intaka Tech Worlds View Challenge 3
5th Road race, National Road Championships
2009
African Road Championships

1st Team time trial (with Reinardt Janse van Rensburg, Ian McLeod and Jay Robert Thomson)
7th Road race

2nd Giro del Capo Challenge 1
6th Giro del Capo Challenge 4
2010
1st Road race, National Road Championships
2011
3rd Road race, National Road Championships
