= 947 Ride Joburg =

Cycle race in Johannesburg, South Africa

Ride Joburg
Race details
- Date: 4th weekend in October
- Region: Johannesburg, South Africa
- English name: Ride Joburg
- Nickname: Ride Joburg
- Discipline: Road, Mountain Bike and Children's cycling events
- Type: One-day
- Race director: JP Nortje

History
- First edition: 1997
- Editions: 28

The Ride Joburg (formally known as the 94.7 cycle challenge) is the world's second-largest timed cycle race, after the Cape Argus Cycle Race. It is held annually on cycle challenge Sunday, the 4th weekend in October in the South African city of Johannesburg. Between 20,000 and 30,000 participants complete the challenging 94.7 km (58.8 mi) course every year. The event's main sponsors are 947 (radio station) and Virgin Active and Momentun in previous years, Momentum.)

The Ride Joburg Mountain Bike Challenge is held the weekend before the road race. It consists of two distances; a 30 km (19 mi) race and a 55 km (34 mi) race. In 2012 a 40 km (25 mi) fun ride was introduced and took place the day before the Mountain Bike Challenge.

== Past winners ==
=== Men ===
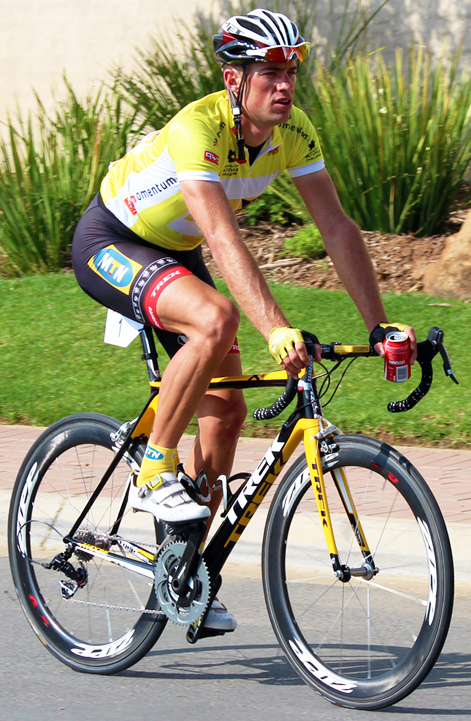
Arran Brown, winner of 2 Challenges, after placing third in 2012

Year	Country	Rider	Team
1997	South Africa	Nicholas White	
1998	South Africa	Ryan Cox	
1999	South Africa	Robert Hunter	
2000	South Africa	Malcolm Lange	
2001	South Africa	Malcolm Lange	
2002	South Africa	Daniel Spence	
2003	South Africa	Ian McLeod	
2004	Italy	Antonio Salomone	
2005	South Africa	Darren Lill	
2006	Slovakia	Martin Velits	
2007	South Africa	Herman Fouche	Team Konica Minolta
2008	South Africa	Malcolm Lange	Team MTN
2009	South Africa	Arran Brown	Medscheme
2010	South Africa	Nicholas White	Medscheme
2011	South Africa	Arran Brown	MTN–Qhubeka
2012	South Africa	Reinardt Janse van Rensburg	MTN–Qhubeka
2013	South Africa	Willie Smit	Team Bonitas
2014	Namibia	Till Drobisch	MTN–Qhubeka WCC Feeder Team
2015	South Africa	Stefan de Bod	MTN–Qhubeka Feeder Team
2016	South Africa	Brendon Davids	Swiss Cycles
2017	South Africa	Daryl Impey	Orica–Scott
2018	South Africa	Brandon Downes	Team BCX
2019	South Africa	Marc Pritzen	Office Guru
2020	South Africa	Gustav Basson	ProTouch
2021	South Africa	Travis Stedman	Shesha Fuels Racing
2022	South Africa	Reinardt Janse van Rensburg	Lotto-Soudal
2023	South Africa	Marc Pritzen	Honey Comb

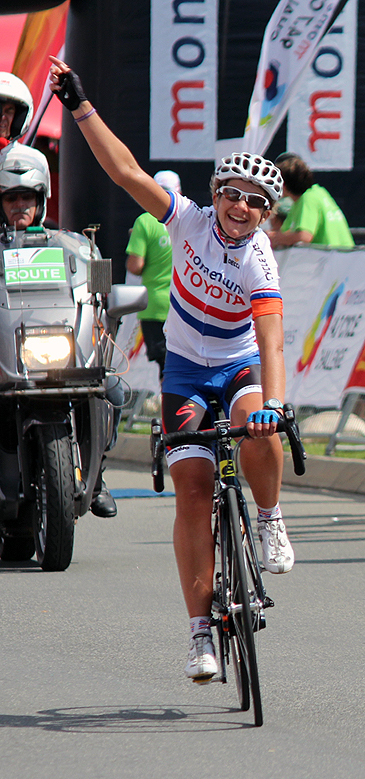
Sharon Laws winning the 2012 women's Challenge

=== Women ===
Year	Country	Rider	Team
2000	South Africa	Mari Rogers	
2001	South Africa	Mari Rogers	
2002	South Africa	Wanda Ariano	
2003	South Africa	Samantha Bounds	
2004	South Africa	Samantha Bounds	
2005	South Africa	Lisa Vermaak	
2006	South Africa	Yolandi du Toit	
2007	South Africa	Anriëtte Schoeman	
2008	South Africa	Anriëtte Schoeman	
2009	South Africa	Joanna Van De Winkel	
2010	South Africa	Cherise Taylor	
2011	South Africa	Ashleigh Moolman	Team Nashua Toyota
2012	Great Britain	Sharon Laws	Momentum Toyota
2013	South Africa	Ashleigh Moolman	Momentum Toyota
2014	Netherlands	Marianne Vos	Rabobank-Liv Woman Cycling Team
2015	South Africa	Ashleigh Moolman	Bigla Pro Cycling Team
2016	Germany	Charlotte Becker	Team Hitec Products
2017	South Africa	Ashleigh Moolman	Bia Africa mixed team
2018	South Africa	Carla Oberholzer	Demacon
2019	South Africa	Carla Oberholzer	Demacon MaxWax
2021	South Africa	Ashleigh Moolman Pasio	SD Worx
2022	Namibia	Vera Looser	InstaFund Racing
2023	South Africa	Carla Oberholzer	Sandton City Cycle Nation

== See also ==
- 947 (radio station)
- Cape Town Cycle Tour
- Cycle racing
