= Jacques Fullard =

South African cyclist

Personal information
- Born: 19 September 1974 (age 52) Pietersburg, South Africa

Cycling career
- Sport: Cycling
- Current team: Retired
- Discipline: Road
- Role: Rider

Professional teams
- 2003: Barloworld
- 2005: Team Konica Minolta

Jacques Fullard (born 19 September 1974) is a South African former professional racing cyclist. He won the South African National Road Race Championships in 2001 and 2006.

== Major results ==
1997
3rd Road race, National Road Championships
1998
2nd Road race, National Road Championships
1999
1st Stage 6 Giro del Capo
3rd Road race, All-Africa Games
3rd Road race, National Road Championships
2001
1st Road race, African Road Championships
1st Road race, National Road Championships
2004
1st Pick n Pay Amashovashova National Classic
2005
1st Powerade Dome 2 Dome Cycling Spectacular
2006
1st Road race, National Road Championships
