= Simon Kessler =

South African cyclist

Personal information
- Born: 14 March 1975 (age 51) Johannesburg, South Africa

Cycling career
- Sport: Cycling
- Current team: Retired
- Discipline: Road
- Role: Rider

Professional teams
- 2001: Team IBM–Lotus Development
- 2002: Microsoft
- 2003: Sportsbook.com Cycling Team–Acrow Bridges

Simon Kessler (born 14 March 1975) is a South African former professional racing cyclist. He won the South African National Road Race Championships in 1998 and 2000.

== Major results ==
1998
National Road Championships

1st Road race
2nd Time trial

1999
2nd Time trial, National Road Championships
2000
National Road Championships

1st Road race
3rd Time trial

2001
1st Time trial, African Road Championships
2nd Road race, National Road Championships
2003
Giro del Capo

1st Points classification
1st Stage 2
