= Martin Velits =

Slovak road bicycle racer

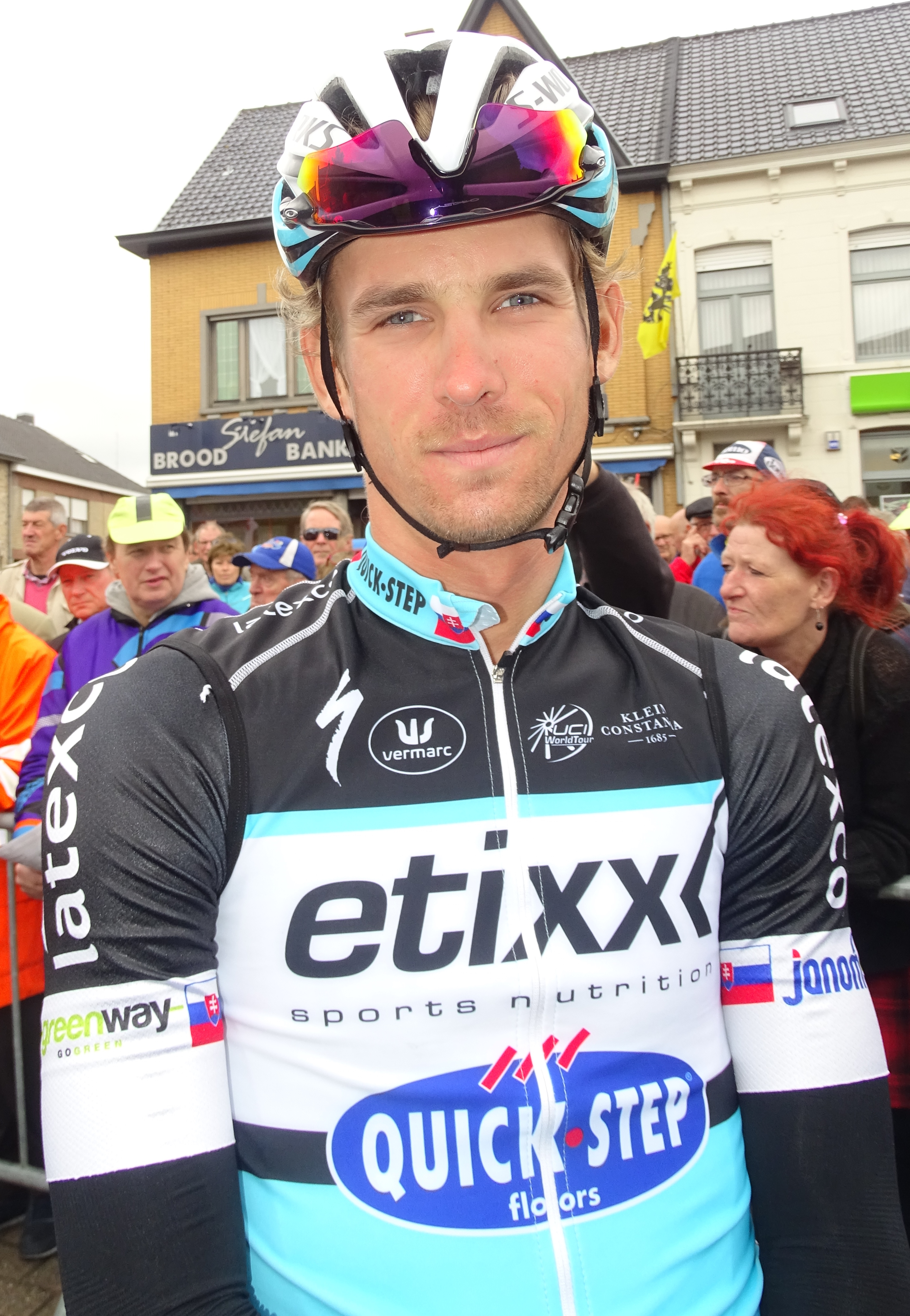
- Velits at the 2015 Kampioenschap van Vlaanderen

Personal information
- Born: 21 February 1985 (age 41) Bratislava, Czechoslovakia
- Height: 1.85 m (6 ft 1 in)
- Weight: 72 kg (159 lb)

Cycling career
- Sport: Cycling
- Current team: Retired
- Discipline: Road
- Role: Rider
- Rider type: Time trialist; Domestique

Amateur teams
- 2004: Dukla Trenčín
- 2005–2006: Team Konica Minolta

Professional teams
- 2007: Wiesenhof–Felt
- 2008–2009: Team Milram
- 2010–2011: Team HTC–Columbia
- 2012–2017: Omega Pharma–Quick-Step

Major wins
- Grand Tours Vuelta a España 1 TTT stage (2010) One-day races and Classics National Road Race Championships (2009) National Time Trial Championships (2010)

Martin Velits (born 21 February 1985) is a Slovak former road bicycle racer, who rode professionally between 2007 and 2017 for the Wiesenhof, Team Milram, HTC–Highroad and Quick-Step Floors teams. His twin brother, Peter Velits, also competed as a professional cyclist.

In October 2017, one year after his brother's retirement, Martin Velits announced that he would retire after competing in that year's inaugural Tour of Guangxi.

== Post-cycling career ==
Following his retirement from professional cycling in 2017, Velits co-founded Isadore Apparel, a sustainable cycling clothing brand based in Púchov, Slovakia, together with his twin brother Peter Velits. The brand was established in 2013 while both brothers were still competing, with Martin focusing on product development during the brand's early years before dedicating himself to the company full-time after retirement. Isadore produces cycling apparel using sustainable materials including merino wool, with manufacturing based in Europe under OEKO-TEX and bluesign standards.

== Major results ==
2003
1st Overall Grand Prix Rüebliland
9th Overall Internationale Junioren-Rundfahrt Niedersachsen

1st Stage 3

2004
1st Road race, National Under-23 Road Championships
2005
1st Road race, National Under-23 Road Championships
1st Stage 3a Giro del Capo
7th Overall Okolo Slovenska

1st Young rider classification

2006
1st Road race, National Under-23 Road Championships
1st 947 Cycle Challenge
7th Overall Giro del Capo
8th Overall Tour of Japan
9th Trofeo Banca Popolare di Vicenza
9th Memorial Philippe Van Coningsloo
10th GP Hydraulika Mikolasek
2007
10th Overall Ster Elektrotoer
2008
8th Overall Driedaagse van West-Vlaanderen
2009
1st Road race, National Road Championships
4th Overall Vuelta a Andalucía
2010
1st Time trial, National Road Championships
1st Stage 1 (TTT) Vuelta a España
8th Overall Tour of Oman
2012
2nd Time trial, National Road Championships
2013
1st Stage 1 (TTT) Tirreno–Adriatico

=== Grand Tour general classification results timeline ===
| Grand Tour | 2008 | 2009 | 2010 | 2011 | 2012 | 2013 | 2014 | 2015 | 2016 |
|---|---|---|---|---|---|---|---|---|---|
| Giro d'Italia | — | — | — | — | DNF | — | — | — | — |
| Tour de France | — | — | — | — | 88 | — | — | — | — |
| Vuelta a España | 73 | 95 | 105 | 125 | — | — | 130 | 117 | 152 |

Legend
| — | Did not compete |
| DNF | Did not finish |
