= Tour of Hong Kong Shanghai =

Race details
- Region: Hong Kong/China
- Discipline: Road race
- Competition: UCI Asia Tour
- Type: Stage race

History
- First edition: 2006
- Editions: 3
- Final edition: 2008
- First winner: Geert Steurs (BEL)
- Most wins: No repeat winners
- Final winner: Christoff van Heerden (RSA)

The Tour of Hong Kong Shanghai was a professional cycling race held annually in Hong Kong. It was part of UCI Asia Tour in category 2.2.

== Winners ==
Year	Country	Rider	Team
2006	Belgium	Geert Steurs	
2007	Australia	James Meadley	
2008	South Africa	Christoff van Heerden	Team Konica Minolta–Bizhub
