= An-Li Kachelhoffer =

South African cyclist (born 1987)

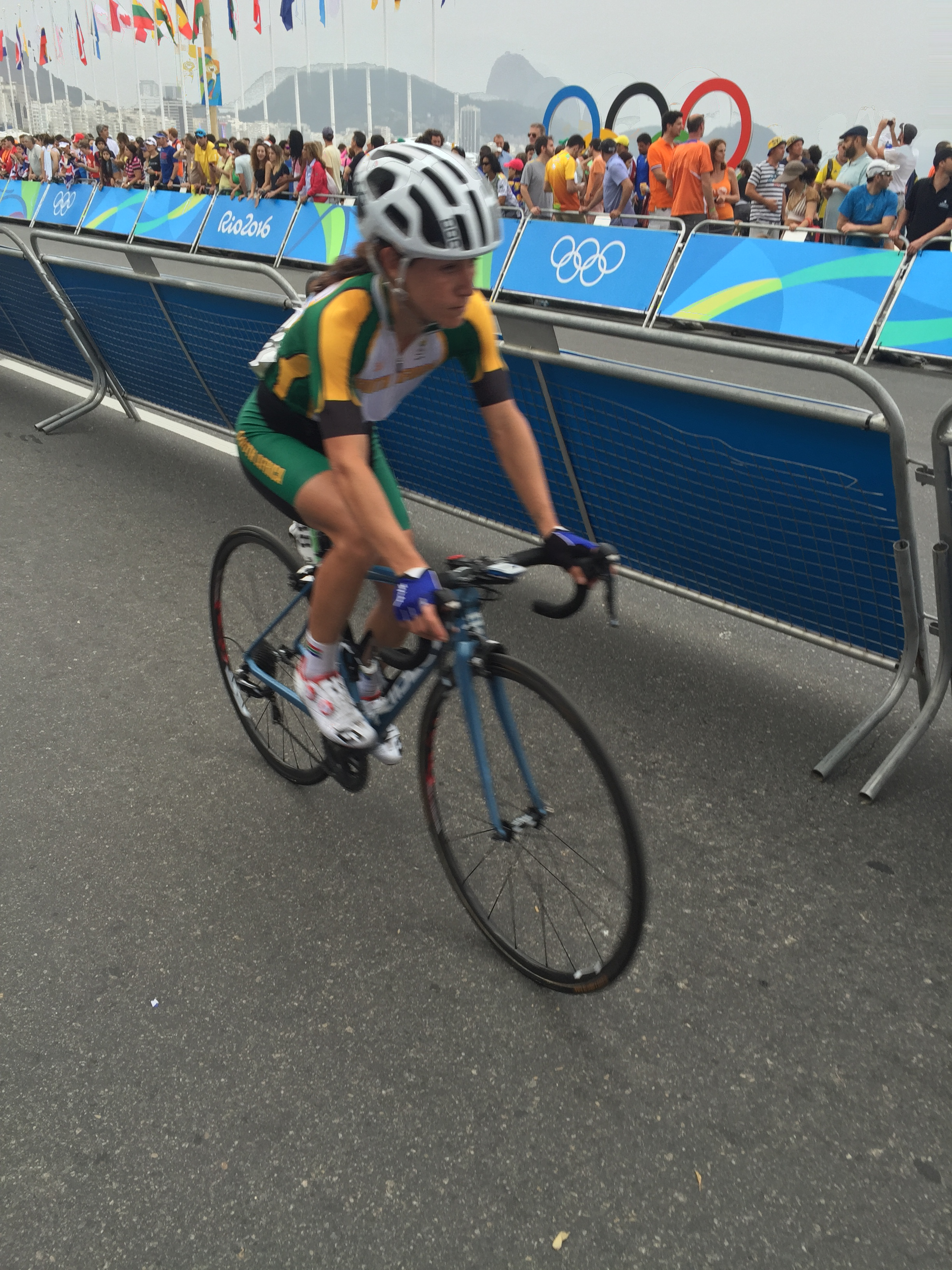
- Kachelhoffer at the 2016 Summer Olympics

Personal information
- Full name: An-Li Kachelhoffer
- Born: An-Li Pretorius; 16 August 1987 (age 39) Pretoria, South Africa

Cycling career
- Sport: Cycling
- Current team: Retired
- Discipline: Road
- Role: Rider

Amateur teams
- 2011: Team MTN–Qhubeka
- 2013: Sengers Ladies Cycling Team (guest)
- 2017: Team Bestmed–ASG (guest)

Professional teams
- 2010: MTN
- 2012: Lotto–Belisol Ladies
- 2016–2017: Lotto–Soudal Ladies

An-Li Kachelhoffer (née Pretorius; born 16 August 1987) is a South African former road cyclist. She participated at the 2014 UCI Road World Championships. In 2016, she won the South African National Road Race Championships. She represented South Africa at the 2016 Summer Olympics in the women's road race in which she finished 39th with a time of 4:01:29.

== Major results ==
2007
9th 947 Cycle Challenge
2009
9th 947 Cycle Challenge
2010
9th 947 Cycle Challenge
2011
8th Road race, Summer Universiade
2012
African Road Championships

2nd Time trial
2nd Road race

3rd Time trial, National Road Championships
2013
3rd Road race, National Road Championships
African Road Championships

4th Road race
5th Time trial

2014
6th 947 Cycle Challenge
2015
African Road Championships

1st Team time trial
4th Road race

2nd Road race, National Road Championships
KZN Autumn Series

2nd Freedom Day Classic
3rd Hibiscus Cycle Classic

8th Overall Tour Cycliste Féminin International de l'Ardèche

1st Stage 6

8th 947 Cycle Challenge
2016
African Road Championships

1st Team time trial
2nd Road race

1st Road race, National Road Championships
2017
2nd Road race, National Road Championships
8th Road race, African Road Championships
