= Marc Pritzen =

South African cyclist

Personal information
- Full name: Mark Oliver Pritzen
- Born: 11 August 1999 (age 27) Windhoek, Namibia
- Height: 1.93 m (6 ft 4 in)

Cycling career
- Sport: Cycling
- Current team: Team Honeycomb Pro Cycling
- Discipline: Road
- Role: Rider

Amateur teams
- 2018: Team BCX
- 2019: Office Guru
- 2019: Super Froiz
- 2022: Honeycomb PC
- 2024–: Team Honeycomb Pro Cycling

Professional teams
- 2020–2021: NTT Continental Cycling Team
- 2023: EF Education–Nippo Development Team

Major wins
- Single-day races and Classics National Road Race Championships (2021)

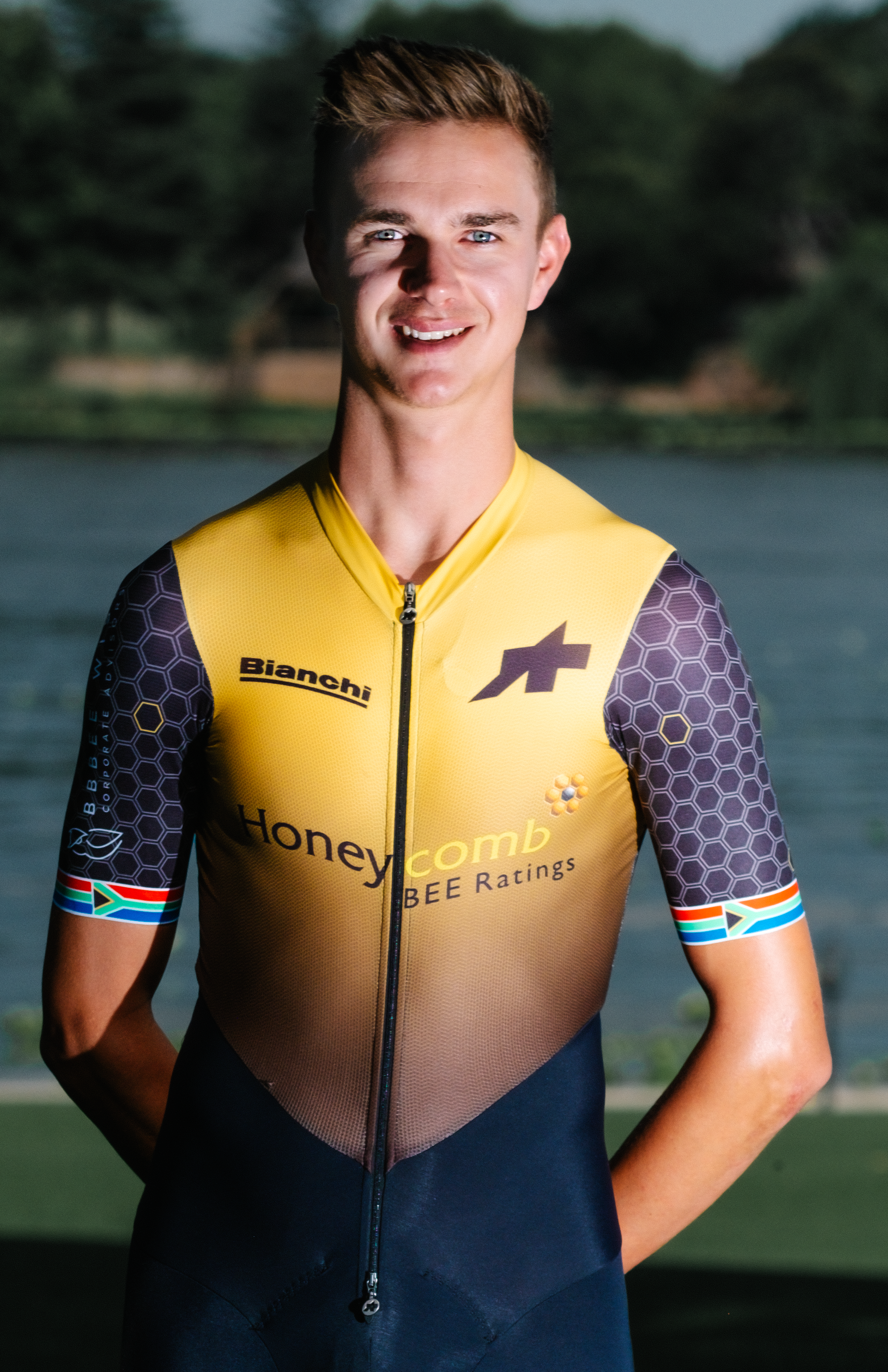
Member of Team Honeycomb Pro Cycling

Mark Oliver Pritzen (born 11 August 1999) is a South African cyclist, who currently rides for club team Team Honeycomb Pro Cycling.

== Major results ==
2019
1st Overall Tour of Good Hope

1st Youth classification
1st Stages 3 (TTT) & 5 1st Overall, Road Race, 947 Ride Joburg

2020
2nd Time trial, National Under-23 Road Championships
2021
1st Road race, National Road Championships
1st Time trial, National Under-23 Road Championships
2022
3rd Road race, National Road Championships
1st Overall, Cape Town Cycle Tour
1st Overall, Amashova National Classics
2nd Road Race, 947 Ride Joburg
2023
1st Mountains classification, Tour du Rwanda
1st Overall, Road Race, 947 Ride Joburg
2024
1st Prologue Tour de Maurice
2nd Overall Tour du Cap

1st Stage 4 5th Classique de l'ìle Maurice

1st Overall, Race to the Sun
