= Rodney Green (cyclist) =

South African cyclist

Personal information
- Born: 23 May 1974 (age 52) Johannesburg, South Africa

Cycling career
- Sport: Cycling
- Current team: Retired
- Discipline: Road
- Role: Rider

Professional teams
- 2002–2003: Team HSBC
- 2004–2006: Barloworld
- 2007: Team Konica Minolta

Rodney "Jock" Green (born 23 May 1974) is a South African former professional racing cyclist. In 1997 he won the South African National Road Race Championships.

== Major results ==
1997
1st Road race, National Road Championships
2002
1st Stage 6 Tour of Qinghai Lake
2003
3rd Road race, National Road Championships
2005
3rd Road race, National Road Championships
