= Jaco Venter =

South African cyclist

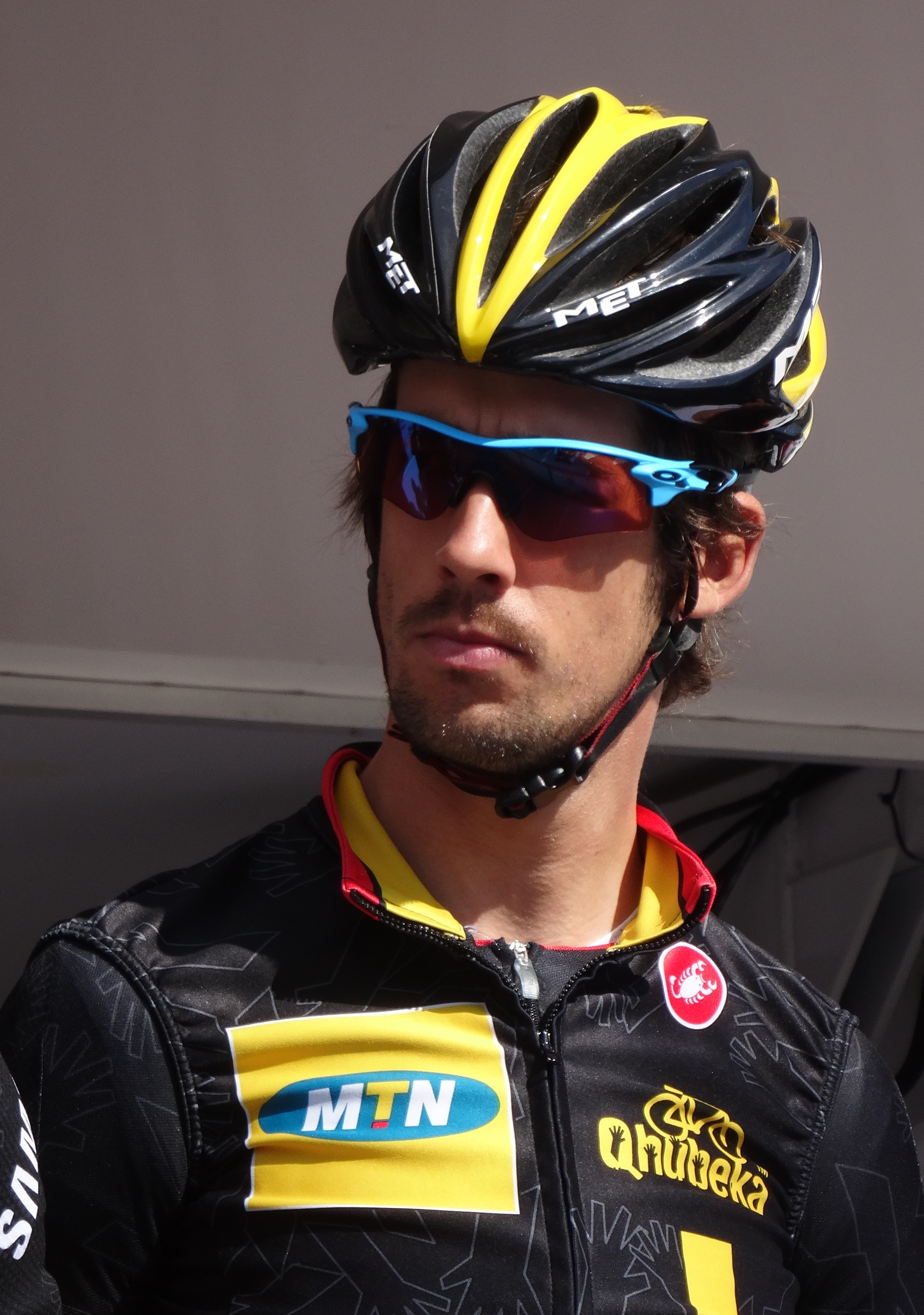
- Venter in 2014

Personal information
- Full name: Jacobus Venter
- Born: 13 February 1987 (age 39) Stellenbosch, South Africa
- Height: 1.89 m (6 ft 2 in)
- Weight: 70 kg (154 lb)

Cycling career
- Sport: Cycling
- Current team: Faucon Flacq KFC Pepsi
- Disciplines: Road; Mountain biking
- Role: Rider

Amateur teams
- 2020–?: First Move
- 2020: AlfaBodyWorks–Giant
- 2023: Western Cape
- 2024–: Faucon Flacq KFC Pepsi

Professional teams
- 2006: Team Konica Minolta
- 2007–2008: Neotel
- 2009: Trek–Marco Polo
- 2010: MTN–Energade
- 2011: Veranda's Willems–Accent
- 2012: Differdange–Magic–SportFood.de
- 2012–2019: MTN–Qhubeka

Major wins
- One-day races and Classics National Road Race Championships (2016)

Jacobus Venter (born 13 February 1987) is a South African racing cyclist, who currently rides for amateur team Faucon Flacq KFC Pepsi.

During his road racing career, Venter rode in the 2014 Vuelta a España. In 2016, he won the South African National Road Race Championships. He was named in the start list for the 2016 Giro d'Italia. In June 2017, he was named in the startlist for the 2017 Tour de France.

== Major results ==
2005
2nd Road race, National Junior Road Championships
5th Overall Tour de Lorraine
2007
1st Powerade Dome 2 Dome Cycling Spectacular
2008
9th Overall Coupe des nations Ville Saguenay
2009
1st Time trial, National Under-23 Road Championships
4th Overall Tour de l'Avenir
5th Overall Grand Prix du Portugal
10th Overall Tour de Korea
2010
3rd Time trial, National Road Championships
10th Overall La Tropicale Amissa Bongo
2011
2nd Team time trial, African Road Championships
2012
5th Time trial, African Road Championships
6th Duo Normand (with Reinardt Janse van Rensburg)
8th Gooikse Pijl
2014
3rd Time trial, National Road Championships
2016
1st Road race, National Road Championships
2023
3rd Overall Tour du Cap
2024
4th Overall Tour du Cap

1st Stage 5

7th Classique de l'ìle Maurice

=== Grand Tour general classification results timeline ===
Grand Tour	2014	2015	2016	2017	2018	2019
Giro d'Italia	—	—	101	—	95	—
Tour de France	—	—	—	162	—	—
Vuelta a España	123	122	145	—	—	129

Legend
—	Did not compete
DNF	Did not finish
