= Morné van Niekerk =

South African cyclist

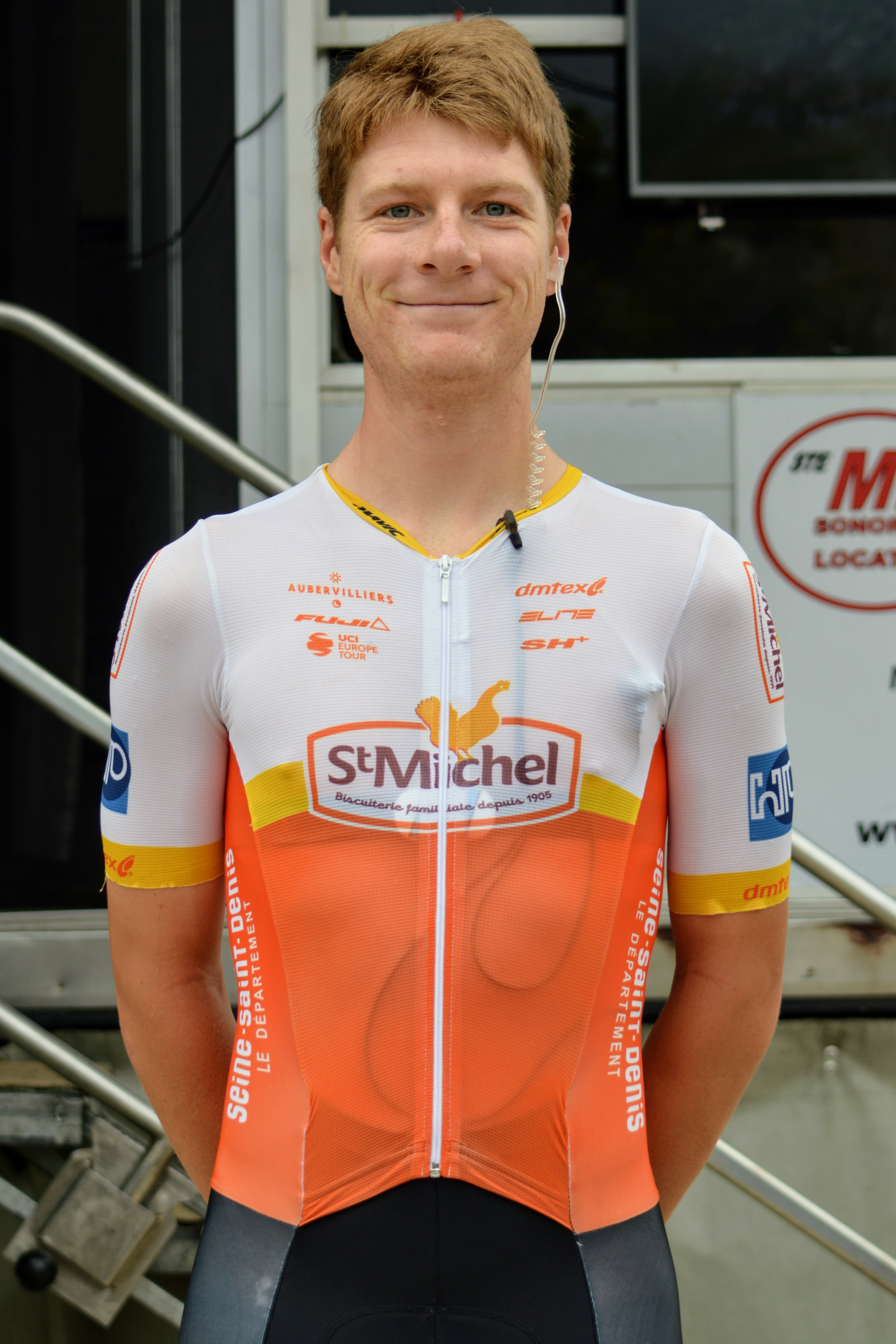
- Van Niekerk in 2019

Personal information
- Born: 17 August 1995 (age 31) Centurion, Gauteng, South Africa
- Height: 1.78 m (5 ft 10 in)
- Weight: 64 kg (141 lb)

Cycling career
- Sport: Cycling
- Current team: St. Michel–Preference Home–Auber93
- Discipline: Road
- Role: Rider
- Rider type: Puncheur

Amateur teams
- 2014–2015: Team Abantu
- 2016: Fundación Euskadi–EDP
- 2016: Team Telkom
- 2017: Team Martigues SC–Drag Bicycles
- 2018: Team Christian Magimel

Professional teams
- 2017: Dimension Data for Qhubeka (stagiaire)
- 2019–: St. Michel–Auber93

Morné van Niekerk (born 17 August 1995) is a South African cyclist, who currently rides for UCI Continental team St. Michel–Preference Home–Auber93.

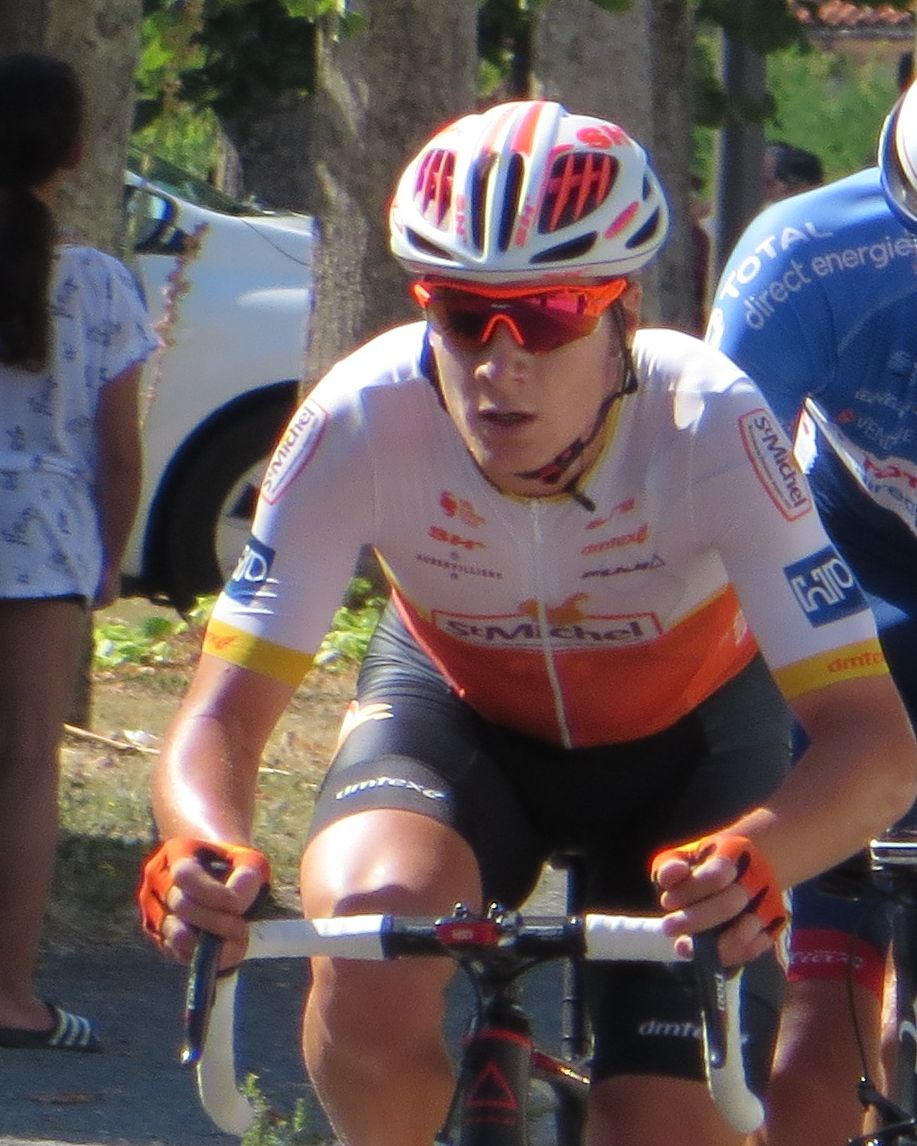
Van Niekerk at the 2019 Tour du Poitou-Charentes

== Major results ==
2013
African Junior Road Championships

1st Team time trial
2nd Time trial
6th Road race

National Junior Road Championships

2nd Road race
3rd Time trial

2015
African Track Championships

1st Team pursuit
2nd Individual pursuit

1st Time trial, National Under-23 Road Championships
9th PMB Road Classic
2016
National Track Championships

1st Points race
1st Team pursuit

2017
3rd Road race, National Under-23 Road Championships
8th Overall Tour de Serbie
2019
1st Mountains classification, Tour du Limousin
2021
2nd Grand Prix de la ville de Nogent-sur-Oise
2022
3rd Grand Prix de la ville de Pérenchies
7th Overall Ronde de l'Oise
8th Tro-Bro Léon
2023
2nd Grand Prix de la ville de Pérenchies
3rd Grand Prix de la Ville de Lillers
2024
2nd Overall Tour de Bretagne
3rd Road race, National Road Championships
6th Tro-Bro Léon
