= Cherise Willeit =

South African cyclist (born 1989)

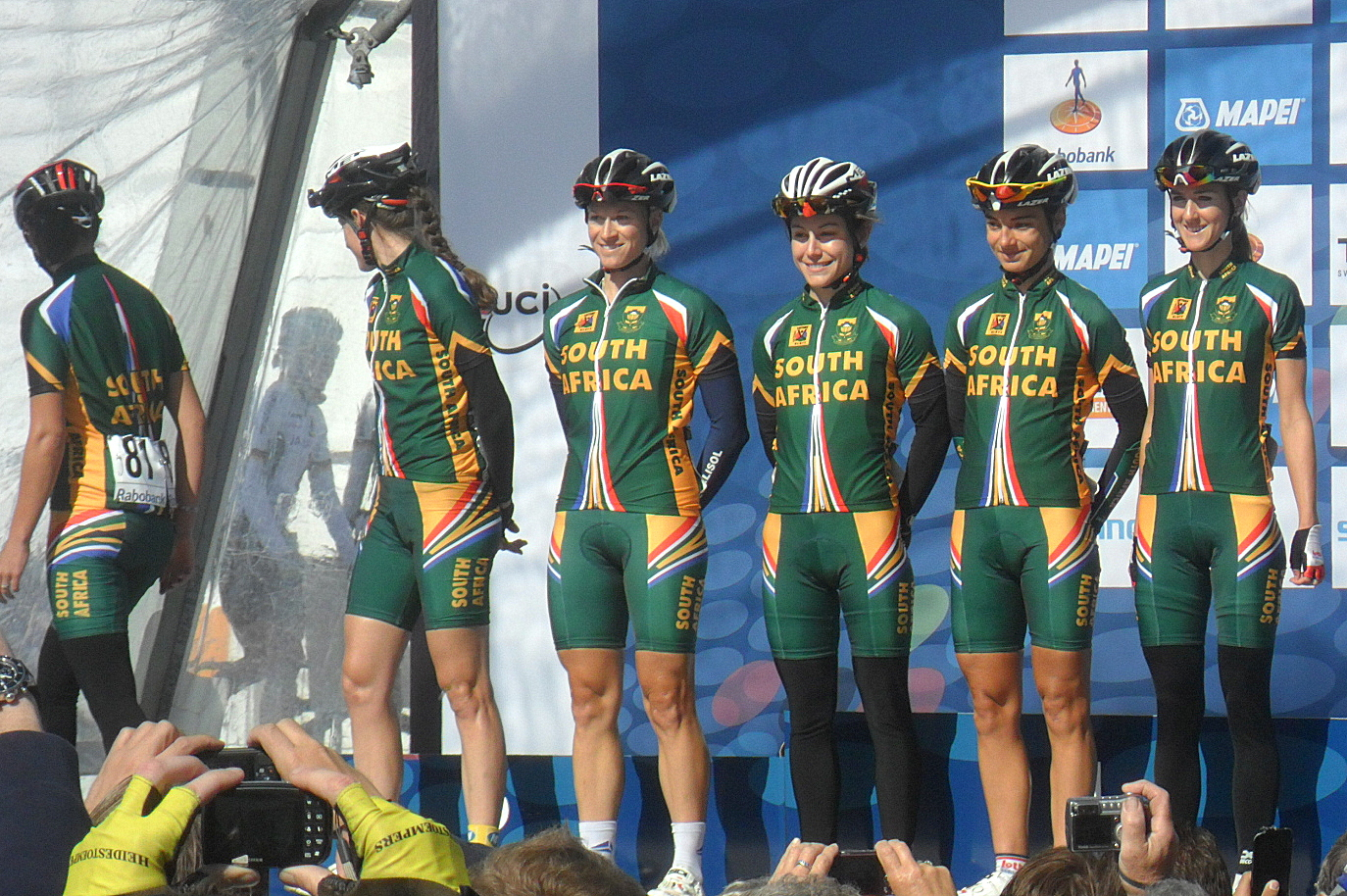
- Willeit at the 2012 UCI Road World Championships

Personal information
- Full name: Cherise Willeit
- Born: Cherise Taylor; 6 November 1989 (age 36) Pretoria, South Africa
- Height: 1.68 m (5 ft 6 in)
- Weight: 54 kg (119 lb)

Cycling career
- Sport: Cycling
- Current team: Sandton City Cycle Nation
- Discipline: Road
- Role: Rider
- Rider type: Time trialist

Amateur teams
- 2008: MTN
- 2010: Nashua Ladies Pro Cycling Team
- 2015: CSA Women's Development Team
- 2020–2020: Team Customized Cycling BioPlus
- 2022 -: Sandton City Cycle Nation

Professional teams
- 2009: MTN
- 2010: MTN
- 2011–2012: Lotto–Honda Team

Major wins
- National Road Race Championships (2008, 2010) National Time Trial Championships (2011, 2012)

Cherise Willeit (née Taylor, previously Stander; born 6 November 1989) is a South African professional road cyclist. She has won a single African and four South African championship titles, in both the road race and the time trial, and later represented her nation at the 2008 Summer Olympics. Willeit also raced for Belgium's Lotto–Belisol Ladies professional cycling team in 2011 and 2012.

== Professional career ==
Born in Pretoria, Willeit qualified for the South African squad in the women's road race at the 2008 Summer Olympics in Beijing by receiving one of the nation's two available berths from the UCI World Cup. She successfully completed a grueling race with a fifty-ninth-place effort, finishing in 3:48:33, surpassing Cuba's Yumari González by a wide, three-minute gap. That same year, Willeit earned the women's elite road race title in her first attempt at the South African National Road Race Championships.

Willeit's success in the South African Championships landed her a spot on the MTN team for the 2009 season, followed by her official stint on the Lotto–Honda Team in 2011. That year, Willeit flourished, winning two time trial events at both the South African Championships, and at the UCI African Continental Championships in Asmara, Eritrea.

Willeit also sought her bid for the 2012 Summer Olympics in London, but the South African Sports Confederation and Olympic Committee (SASCOC) excluded her from the team. Moreover, Cycling South Africa decided to reject her appeal based on the board's scrutiny and decision in the due process and procedures for the national team's final selection.

== Personal life ==
Willeit married elite mountain biker and African under-23 champion Burry Stander in May 2012. Stander was killed during a collision with a taxi while training near his residence in Shelly Beach the following year. She later married Benjamin Willeit and became a mother to a son.

== Major results ==
2006
2nd Road race, African Junior Road Championships
6th Road race, UCI Juniors World Championships
2007
UCI Juniors World Championships

2nd Road race
10th Time trial

2008
1st Road race, National Road Championships
7th Overall Tour of Chongming Island

1st Stage 4

2009
2nd Road race, African Road Championships
3rd Road race, National Road Championships
2010
1st Road race, National Road Championships
7th Overall Women's Tour of New Zealand
10th Road race, Commonwealth Games
2011
African Road Championships

1st Road race
2nd Time trial

National Road Championships

1st Time trial
3rd Road race

10th Ronde van Gelderland
2012
1st Time trial, National Road Championships
1st Stage 2 La Route de France
2014
2nd Road race, National Road Championships
2015
KZN Autumn Series

1st PMB Road Classic
1st Hibiscus Cycle Classic

2nd Time trial, National Road Championships
