= Daryl Impey =

South African racing cyclist

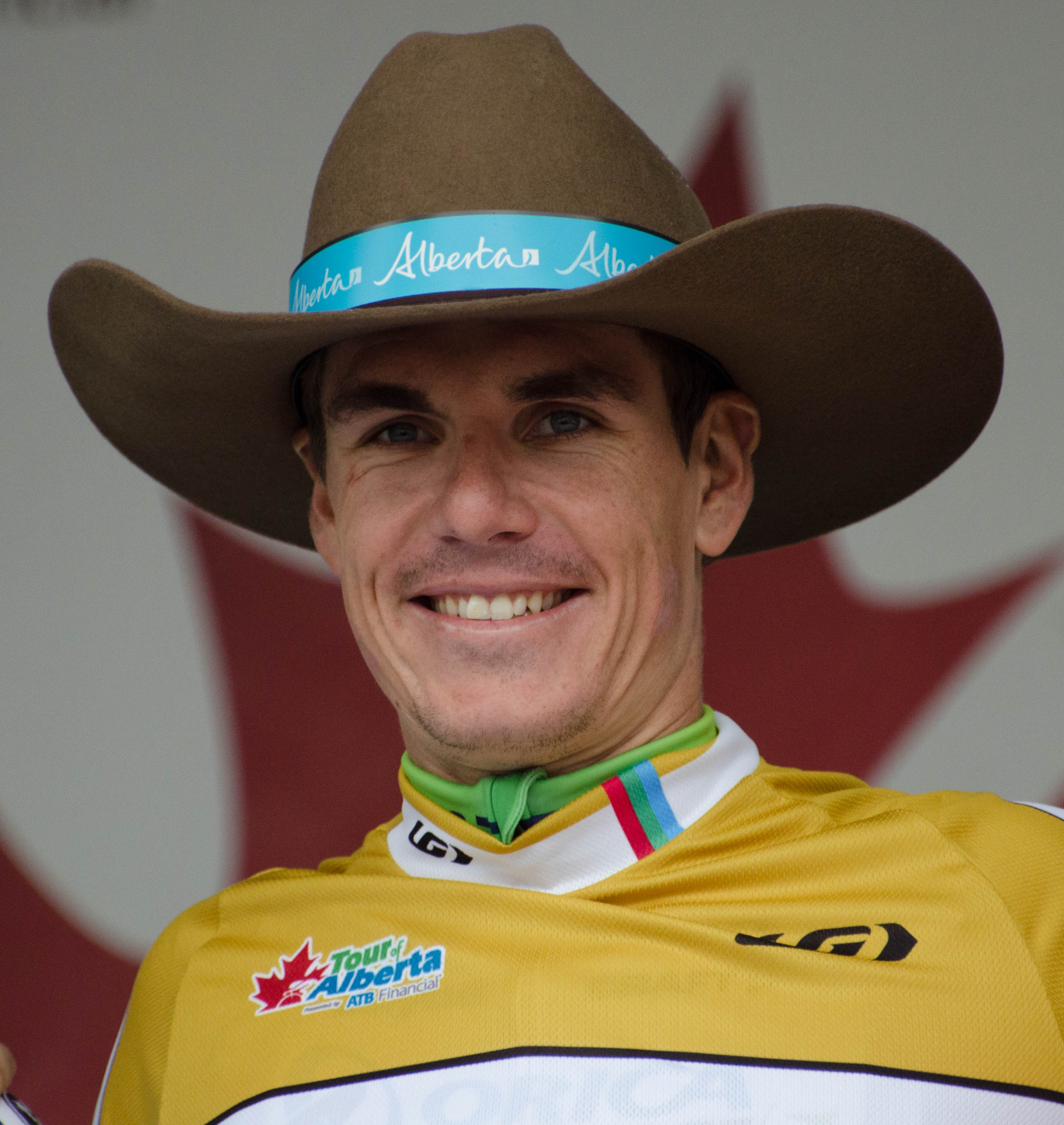
- Impey at the 2014 Tour of Alberta

Personal information
- Full name: Daryl Impey
- Born: 6 December 1984 (age 41) Johannesburg, South Africa
- Height: 1.83 m (6 ft 0 in)
- Weight: 70 kg (154 lb; 11 st 0 lb)

Cycling career
- Sport: Cycling
- Discipline: Road
- Role: Rider
- Rider type: All-rounder; Super-domestique

Professional teams
- 2008–2009: Barloworld
- 2010: Team RadioShack
- 2011: MTN–Qhubeka
- 2011: Team NetApp
- 2012–2020: GreenEDGE
- 2021–2023: Israel Start-Up Nation

Major wins
- Grand Tours Tour de France 1 individual stage (2019) 1 TTT stage (2013) Stage races Tour of Turkey (2009) Tour of Alberta (2014) Tour Down Under (2018, 2019) One-day races and Classics National Road Race Championships (2018, 2019) National Time Trial Championships (2011, 2013–2020)
Medal record
Representing Orica–GreenEDGE (2013) Orica–BikeExchange (2016)
Men's road bicycle racing
World Championships
| Silver medal – second place | 2013 Tuscany | Team time trial |
| Bronze medal – third place | 2016 Doha | Team time trial |
Representing South Africa
Commonwealth Games
| Silver medal – second place | 2022 Birmingham | Men's Road Race |

Daryl Impey (born 6 December 1984) is a South African former professional road cyclist, who competed as a professional from 2008 to 2023. Impey is an all-rounder; he generally comes to the fore on tough uphill sprints.

Impey is a two-time winner of the Tour Down Under, and the only rider to have won the race in consecutive years, winning in 2018, and 2019. He has won the South African National Road Race Championships twice, and is a nine-time winner of the South African National Time Trial Championships, including eight consecutive titles between 2013 and 2020. In 2013, Impey became the first African rider to wear the yellow jersey at the Tour de France, doing so for two days; six years later, he won his first individual stage at the race, winning the ninth stage in Brioude.

== Career ==
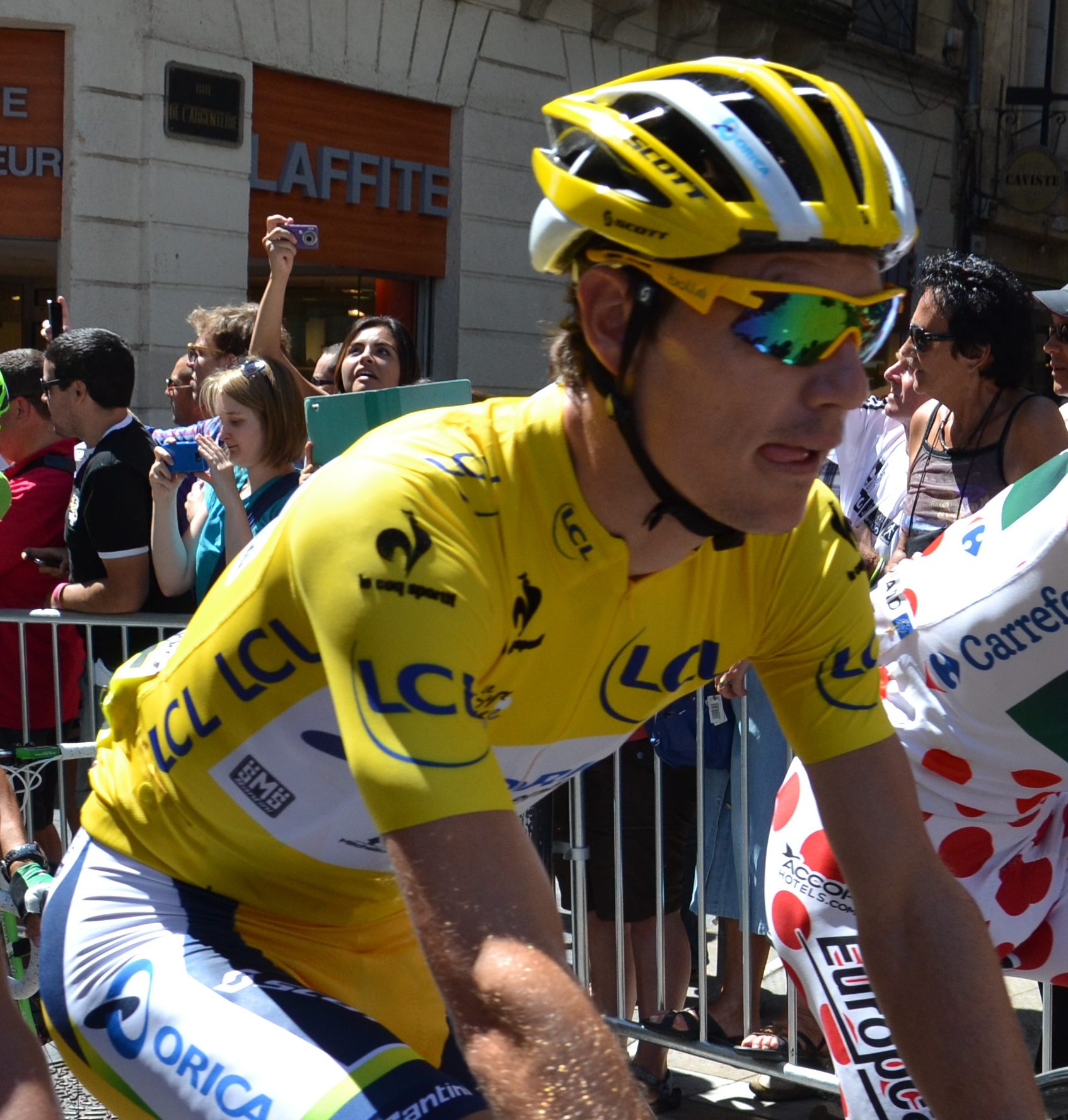
Impey wearing the yellow jersey at the 2013 Tour de France

After riding for the South African team Barloworld in 2008 and 2009, in 2010 Impey joined Team RadioShack. Impey had originally signed for 2011 with the Australian team called Pegasus, but was forced to seek employment elsewhere after that team failed to secure a UCI license. After riding for MTN–Qhubeka and Team NetApp in 2011, Impey joined GreenEDGE for the squad's inaugural season in 2012. He won a stage of the Tour of the Basque Country in April of that year, before making his Grand Tour debut at the Giro d'Italia in May. In 2013, he became the first South African ever to lead the Tour de France.

He won the Tour of Alberta in 2014 by a single second thanks to his victory in the last stage, which gave him enough bonus seconds to overtake Tom Dumoulin. Impey confirmed his good form a couple of days later by taking the fourth place on the Grand Prix Cycliste de Québec.

In 2015, Impey had to abandon the Tour de France after being involved in a massive crash on the third stage. He was named in the start list for the 2015 Vuelta a España.

In August 2020, it was announced that Impey was to join Israel Start-Up Nation from the 2021 season – alongside his former Barloworld teammate Chris Froome – on a two-year contract.

== Major results ==
2003
1st Road race, National Under-23 Road Championships
2004
National Under-23 Road Championships

1st Time trial
2nd Road race

1st Stage 5 Giro del Capo
6th Overall Tour de Tunisie
2006
African Road Championships

3rd Time trial
4th Road race

2007
1st Road race, All-Africa Games
Giro del Capo

1st Points classification
1st Prologue & Stage 2

1st Stage 10 Tour du Maroc
2008
1st Stage 6 Herald Sun Tour
6th Memorial Viviana Manservisi
9th World's View Challenge 1
9th World's View Challenge 2
2009
1st Overall Tour of Turkey

1st Points classification
1st Stage 4

2nd Road race, National Road Championships
3rd Giro del Capo II
7th Giro del Capo IV
2011
1st Time trial, National Road Championships
2nd Overall Tour du Maroc

1st Stage 7

3rd Overall Tour of South Africa
9th Overall Tour of Azerbaijan (Iran)
2012
1st Stage 2 Tour of the Basque Country
1st Stage 2 Tour of Slovenia
2013
1st Time trial, National Road Championships
Tour de France

1st Stage 4 (TTT)
Held after Stages 6–7

1st Stage 2 Tour of the Basque Country
1st Stage 2 Bayern–Rundfahrt
2nd Team time trial, UCI Road World Championships
5th Overall Eneco Tour
5th Vuelta a La Rioja
2014
National Road Championships

1st Time trial
2nd Road race

1st Overall Tour of Alberta

1st Stage 5

4th Grand Prix Cycliste de Québec
7th Overall Bayern–Rundfahrt

1st Stage 3

7th Overall Tour Down Under
2015
National Road Championships

1st Time trial
2nd Road race

2nd Vuelta a La Rioja
3rd 947 Cycle Challenge
6th Overall Tour des Fjords
6th Classic Sud-Ardèche
7th Overall Tour Down Under

1st Sprints classification

2016
1st Time trial, National Road Championships
3rd Team time trial, UCI Road World Championships
2017
1st Time trial, National Road Championships
1st 947 Cycle Challenge
1st Stage 6 Volta a Catalunya
2018
National Road Championships

1st Road race
1st Time trial

1st Overall Tour Down Under
Critérium du Dauphiné

1st Points classification
1st Stage 1

3rd Cadel Evans Great Ocean Road Race
8th GP Industria & Artigianato di Larciano
10th Brabantse Pijl
2019
National Road Championships

1st Road race
1st Time trial

1st Overall Tour Down Under

1st Stage 4

1st Overall Czech Cycling Tour

1st Points classification
1st Stage 1 (TTT)

1st Stage 9 Tour de France
3rd Cadel Evans Great Ocean Road Race
2020
National Road Championships

1st Time trial
2nd Road race

3rd Cadel Evans Great Ocean Road Race
6th Overall Tour Down Under
2021
2nd La Drôme Classic
2022
1st Stage 4 Tour de Suisse
2nd Road race, Commonwealth Games

=== Grand Tour general classification results timeline ===
| Grand Tour | 2012 | 2013 | 2014 | 2015 | 2016 | 2017 | 2018 | 2019 | 2020 | 2021 | 2022 |
|---|---|---|---|---|---|---|---|---|---|---|---|
| Giro d'Italia | DNF | — | — | — | — | — | — | — | — | — | — |
| Tour de France | 111 | 74 | — | DNF | 38 | 47 | 46 | 72 | 97 | — | — |
| Vuelta a España | — | — | — | 84 | — | — | — | — | — | — | 101 |

Legend
| — | Did not compete |
| DNF | Did not finish |
