= Team Bonitas =

South African cycling team

Team information
- UCI code: BNT
- Registered: South Africa
- Founded: 2008
- Disbanded: 2016
- Discipline: Road
- Status: Amateur (2008–2010; 2013–2016); UCI Continental (2011–2012)

Key personnel
- General manager: Malcolm Lange
- Team managers: Malcolm Lange; Barry Austin; Magnus Gouws

Team name history
- 2008–2010 2011–2016: Team Medscheme; Team Bonitas

Team Bonitas was a South African road cycling team that competed from 2008 to 2016. It had a UCI Continental status in 2011 and 2012. The team was owned by former professional cyclist Malcolm Lange.

== Major wins ==
2010
Emirates Cup, Malcolm Lange
2011
South African National Road Race Championship, Darren Lill
Stage 6 Tour of South Africa, Darren Lill
Stage 1 Tour du Maroc, Johann Rabie
2012
Overall Tour du Rwanda, Darren Lill

Stages 3 & 7, Darren Lill

Amashova Durban Classic, Johann Rabie
