= Ronel Van Wyk =

South African cyclist

Personal information
- Born: 19 August 1978 (age 48) Bloemfontein, South Africa

Cycling career
- Sport: Cycling
- Role: Rider

Ronel Van Wyk (born 19 August 1978) is a South African former professional racing cyclist. She won the South African National Road Race Championships on three occasions.
