= Carla Oberholzer =

South African cyclist (born 1987)

Personal information
- Full name: Carla Oberholzer
- Born: Carla van der Merwe; 14 January 1987 (age 39) Bloemfontein
- Height: 161 cm (5 ft 3 in)
- Weight: 48 kg (106 lb)

Cycling career
- Sport: Cycling
- Current team: Sandton City Cycle Nation
- Discipline: Road
- Role: Rider

Amateur teams
- 2015: Team Clover
- 2017–2019: Demacon Cycling Team
- 2022 -: Sandton City Cycle Nation

Professional teams
- 2017: Bizkaia–Durango
- 2020: Bizkaia–Durango

Carla Oberholzer (née van der Merwe; born 14 January 1987) is a South African professional racing cyclist, who most recently rode for UCI Women's Continental Team Bizkaia–Durango. She rode in the women's road race at the 2016 UCI Road World Championships.

In June 2021, she qualified to represent South Africa at the 2020 Summer Olympics.

== Major results ==
2014
Team Bestmed
3rd BestMed Campus2Campus
3rd Dome2Dome Cycle Challenge
3rd BestMed Jock Cycle Classique
3rd Action Ford Berge and Dale
4th 947 Cycle Challenge
2015
Team Clover
1st PPA Mangaung Cycle Tour
1st Panorama Cycle Tour Mixed
1st Druiwefees Kranskop Cycle Challenge
2nd BestMed Satellite Road Classic
2nd Action Ford Berge and Dale Classic
3rd Value Logistics Fast One
3rd Mayoral Cycle Race
6th Road race, National Road Championships
7th 947 Cycle Challenge
Team SA - European Tour: Plouya World Cup, Giro Della Toscana, Tour de la Ardeche
2016
Team Demacon
1st Druifewfees Kranskop Cycle Challenge
1st Panorama 4 Day Cycle Challenge Mixed
1st Wilro Lions Cycle Challenge
1st Mogale Spring Classic
1st Maluti Double 90 TTT
2nd Rand Water Race for Victory
2nd Bestmed Jock Cycle Classique
3rd Queen Sibiya Classic
3rd Berge and Dale Classic
3rd Value Logistics Fast One
4th Road race, National Road Championships
4th 947 Cycle Challenge
2017
Team Bizkaia-Durango UCI
1st Amashova Cycle Classic
1st Bestmed Satellite Classic Road Race
1st Bestmed Jock Cycle 3-day Tour
1st Cansa Lost City Road Race
1st Maluti Double 90 TTT
1st Value Logistics Fast One
6th Time trial, African Road Championships
6th Road race, National Road Championships
19th Vuelta Burgos
17th Copa Espana Villabona
10th Copa Espana Alcobendas
22nd Durango Durango
42nd La Classica Morbihan
51st Grand Prix Plumelec
3rd Copa Espana Calpe
88th LOTTO Thuringen GC
3rd Copa Espana Berriatua
5th Copa Espana Marin
2018
Team Demacon
1st Road race, National Road Championships
1st 947 Cycle Challenge
1st Amashova Cycle Classic
1st Berge & Dale
1st Dischem Ride For Sight
1st Vulintaba Classic
1st Kremetart
1st Medi Help Trap Net
1st Jock Cycle Classic
1st Lowveld Air Relax Tour
1st Tshwane Classic
2019
Team Demacon
1st Team time trial, African Games
1st 947 Ride JHB
1st Amashova Cycle Classic
1st Berge & Dale
1st Jock Cycle Classic
1st Kremetart
1st Maluti Double 90 TTT
1st Panorama Tour
3rd Team time trial, African Road Championships
5th Road race, National Road Championships
1st African Games TTT
Team SA - European Tour: Giro Della Toscana
2020
Team Bizkaia Durango UCI
National Road Championships

2nd Road race
2nd Time trial

1st 947 Cycle Challenge
1st Fast One Cycle Challenge
80th Setmana Ciclista Valenciana
2021
Team Demacon
Team Dubai Police Cycling
African Road Championships

1st Road Race
1st Time trial
1st Team time trial
1st Mixed team relay

National Road Championships

2nd Road race
2nd Time trial

1st Gauteng Provincial Championship | Road Race
1st Sleepy River Cycle race
Tokyo 2020 Olympian
1st Dubai Federation Race 1
1st Dubai Federation Race 2
1st Dubai Federation Race 3
3rd Dubai Federation Race 4
1st Dubai Women's Cycle Challenge
2022
Team Sandton City CycleNation
National Road Championships

1st Time trial
3rd Road race

2023
Team Sandton City CycleNation
1st Jock Cycle Classic
2nd Panorama Cycle Tour
1st East Side Criterium
2nd Amashova Cycle Challenge
1st Virgin Active 947 Ride Joburg
