= David George (cyclist) =

South African cyclist (born 1976)

Personal information
- Born: 23 February 1976 (age 50) Cape Town, South Africa
- Height: 1.78 m (5 ft 10 in)
- Weight: 62 kg (137 lb)

Cycling career
- Sport: Cycling
- Discipline: Road
- Role: Rider

Amateur teams
- 2010: City Cycling and Athletic
- 2011-: 360 Life

Professional teams
- 1999-2000: U.S. Postal Service
- 2001: Vini Caldirola
- 2002: CCC–Polsat
- 2003-2005: Barloworld
- 2006: Relax–GAM
- 2008-2009: Team MTN

David Harold George (born 23 February 1976 in Cape Town) is a South African cyclist. He cycled on the USPS team 1999-2000, and later for Barloworld. In 2003 he won the South African National Road Race Championships. He also competed at the 1996 Summer Olympics, the 2000 Summer Olympics and the 2008 Summer Olympics.

== Doping ==
In 2012, he tested positive for the blood boosting drug EPO by the South African Institute for Drug-Free Sport after biological passport anomalies were detected, and admitted his use of EPO. He was later given a two-year ban for his offence and lost his victory in the Cape Pioneer Trek mountain bike race.

== Major results ==
1999
2nd Overall Giro del Capo
2000
7th Overall Redlands Bicycle Classic
2001
South African Time Trial Champion
2002
1st Overall Giro del Capo

1st Stage 5 ITT

3rd Overall Tour de Langkawi
2003
South African Road Race Champion
1st Overall Giro del Capo

1st Stage 5 ITT

2004
South African Time Trial Champion
1st Overall Giro del Capo
2005
5th Overall Giro del Trentino
2006
South African Time Trial Champion
1st Overall Tour de Langkawi
1st Stage 4 Giro del Capo
2nd Commonwealth Games Road Race
2007
South African Time Trial Champion
3rd Overall Giro del Capo

1st Stage 4

4th Overall Tour de Langkawi
2008
5th Overall Giro del Capo

1st Stage 5

2010
1st Overall Giro del Capo

1st Stage 4 ITT
