= South African National Road Race Championships =

National road cycling championship in South Africa

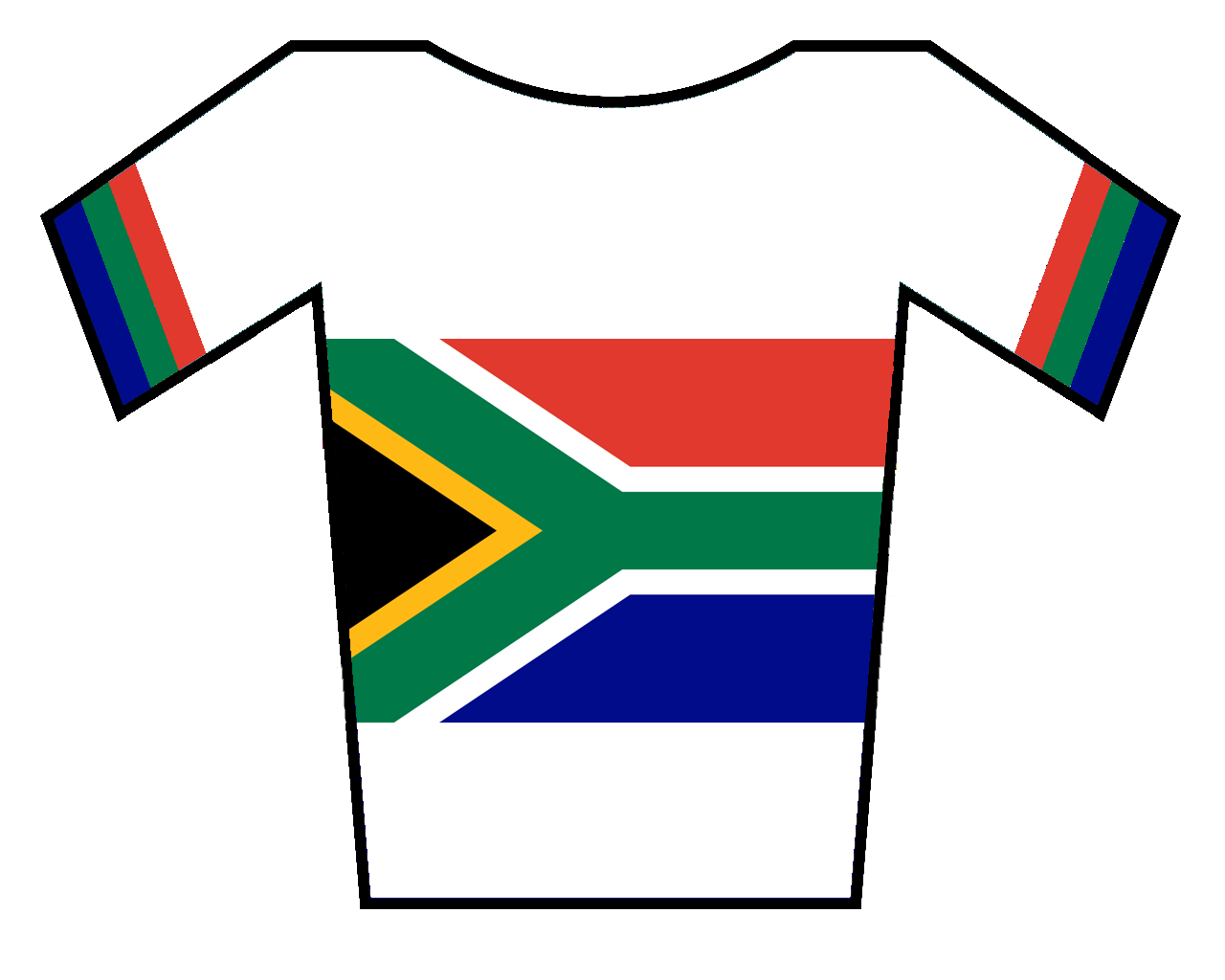
The champion's jersey

The South African National Road Race Championship is a road bicycle race that takes place inside the South African National Cycling Championship, and decides the best cyclist in this type of race. The first race winner of the road race championship was Malcolm Lange in 1995; Malcolm Lange is the only cyclist to have won the championships three times. The women's record is held by Anriette Schoeman with 7 wins.

== Men ==
=== Elite ===
South African National Road Race Championships – Men's elite race
Race details
- Region: South Africa
- Discipline: Road bicycle racing
- Type: One-day

History
- First edition: 1995
- First winner: Malcolm Lange
- Most wins: Malcolm Lange (3 wins)
- Most recent: Ryan Gibbons

Year	Gold	Silver	Bronze
1995	Malcolm Lange		
1996	Not held		
1997	Rodney Green	Jac-Louis Van Wyk	Jacques Fullard
1998	Simon Kessler	Jacques Fullard	Malcolm Lange
1999	Malcolm Lange	Rudolf Wentzel	Jacques Fullard
2000	Simon Kessler	Kosie Loubser	Rudolf Wentzel
2001	Jacques Fullard	Simon Kessler	Owen Hannie
2002	Tiaan Kannemeyer	Ryan Cox	Morne Bester
2003	David George	Malcolm Lange	Rodney Green
2004	Ryan Cox	David George	Nicholas White
2005	Ryan Cox	Tiaan Kannemeyer	Rodney Green
2006	Jacques Fullard	Darren Lill	David George
2007	Malcolm Lange	David George	Neil McDonald
2008	Ian McLeod	Waylon Woolcock	David George
2009	Jamie Ball	Daryl Impey	Kosie Loubser
2010	Christoff Van Heerden	Nicholas White	James Lewis Perry
2011	Darren Lill	Burry Stander	Christoff Van Heerden
2012	Robert Hunter	Reinardt Janse van Rensburg	Johann Rabie
2013	Jay Thomson	Johann Rabie	Ian McLeod
2014	Louis Meintjes (Note: Although an under-23 rider, Meintjes was eligible to win the elite title.)	Daryl Impey	Jay Thomson
2015	Jacques Janse van Rensburg	Daryl Impey	Reinardt Janse van Rensburg
2016	Jaco Venter	Reinardt Janse van Rensburg	Clint Hendricks
2017	Reinardt Janse Van Rensburg	Stefan De Bod	Willie Smit
2018	Daryl Impey	Jacques Janse Van Rensburg	Nolan Hoffman
2019	Daryl Impey	Ryan Gibbons	Stefan de Bod
2020	Ryan Gibbons	Daryl Impey	Jayde Julius
2021	Marc Pritzen	Willie Smit	Nickolas Dlamini
2022	Reinardt Janse van Rensburg	Willie Smit	Marc Pritzen
2023	Travis Stedman	Reinardt Janse Van Rensburg	Gert Heyns
2024	Ryan Gibbons	Tristan Nortje	Morne van Niekerk

=== Under-23 ===
Year	Gold	Silver	Bronze
2003	Daryl Impey	Eckhard Bergh	Willie Van Zyl
2004	Eckhard Bergh	Daryl Impey	Waylon Woolcock
2005	Willie Van Zyl	Eckhard Bergh	John-Lee Augustyn (Note: Dan Craven (NAM) finished the race in third position.)
2006	John-Lee Augustyn	Joey Thompson	Shaun Davel
2007			
2008	Jacques Janse van Rensburg	Johann Rabie	Burry Stander
2009	Clinton Barrow	Henning Jooste	Johann Rabie
2010	Johann van Zyl	Reynard Butler	Reinardt Janse van Rensburg
2011	Johann van Zyl	Louis Meintjes	Jason Bakke
2012	Calvin Beneke	Louis Meintjes	Shaun-Nick Bester
2013	Louis Meintjes	Christopher Jennings	Kyle Donachie
2014	Louis Meintjes	Ryan Gibbons	Nick Dougall
2015	Jayde Julius	Stefan de Bod	Oliver Stapleton-Cotton
2016	Stefan de Bod	Ryan Gibbons	Keagan Girdlestone
2017	Stefan de Bod	Nickolas Dlamini	Morne van Niekerk
2018	Jason Oosthuizen	Ryan Harris	Gustav Basson
2019	Marc Pritzen	Byron Munton	Jason Oosthuizen
2020	Louis Visser	Jean-Pierre Lloyd	Bradley Gouveris
2021	Marc Pritzen	Travis Barrett	Travis Stedman
2022	Callum Ormiston	Travis Stedman	Christiaan Klopper
2023	Travis Stedman	Dillon Geary	Luke Moir

== Women ==
=== Elite ===
South African National Road Race Championships – Women's elite race
Race details
- Region: South Africa
- Discipline: Road bicycle racing
- Type: One-day

History
- First edition: 1998
- First winner: Anriette Schoeman
- Most wins: Anriette Schoeman (7 wins)
- Most recent: Carla Oberholzer

Year	Gold	Silver	Bronze
1998	Anriette Schoeman	Magdalena Day	Ronel Van Wyk
1999	Ronel Van Wyk	Rebecca Stamp	Tracey Jordaan
2000	Anriette Schoeman	Ronel Van Wyk	Annelise Stander
2001	Anriette Schoeman	Ronel Van Wyk	Dalena Nel
2002	Anriette Schoeman	Ronel Van Wyk	Thea Barkhuizen
2003	Anriette Schoeman	Ronel Van Wyk	Altie Pienaar
2004	Anriette Schoeman	Ronel Van Wyk	Chrissie Viljoen
2005	Ronel Van Wyk	Anriette Schoeman	Anke Erlank
2006	Anriette Schoeman	Marissa van der Merwe	Liezl Weideman
2007	Ronel Van Wyk	Marissa van der Merwe	Anriette Schoeman
2008	Cherise Taylor	Robyn De Groot	Elzette Visagie
2009	Lynette Burger	Ashleigh Moolman	Cherise Taylor
2010	Cherise Taylor	Anriette Schoeman	Carla Swart (Note: Jennie Stenerhag (SWE) finished the race in third position.)
2011	Marissa van der Merwe	Robyn De Groot	Cherise Taylor
2012	Ashleigh Moolman	Lise Olivier	Joanna van de Winkel
2013	Ashleigh Moolman	An-Li Kachelhoffer (Note: Sharon Laws (GBR) finished the race in second position.)	Lise Olivier
2014	Ashleigh Moolman	Cherise Stander	Heidi Dalton
2015	Ashleigh Moolman	An-Li Kachelhoffer	Lynette Burger
2016	An-Li Kachelhoffer	Lise Olivier	Anriette Schoeman
2017	Heidi Dalton	An-Li Kachelhoffer	Ashleigh Moolman
2018	Carla Oberholzer	Maroesjka Matthee	Lynette Burger
2019	Ashleigh Moolman	Juanita Venter	Joanna van de Winkel
2020	Ashleigh Moolman	Carla Oberholzer	Maroesjka Matthee
2021	Hayley Preen	Carla Oberholzer	Frances Janse van Rensburg
2022	Frances Janse van Rensburg	Hayley Preen	Carla Oberholzer
2023	Frances Janse van Rensburg	Cherise Taylor	Candice Lill
2024	Carla Oberholzer	Hayley Preen	S'annara Grove
