= Jacques Janse van Rensburg =

South African cyclist

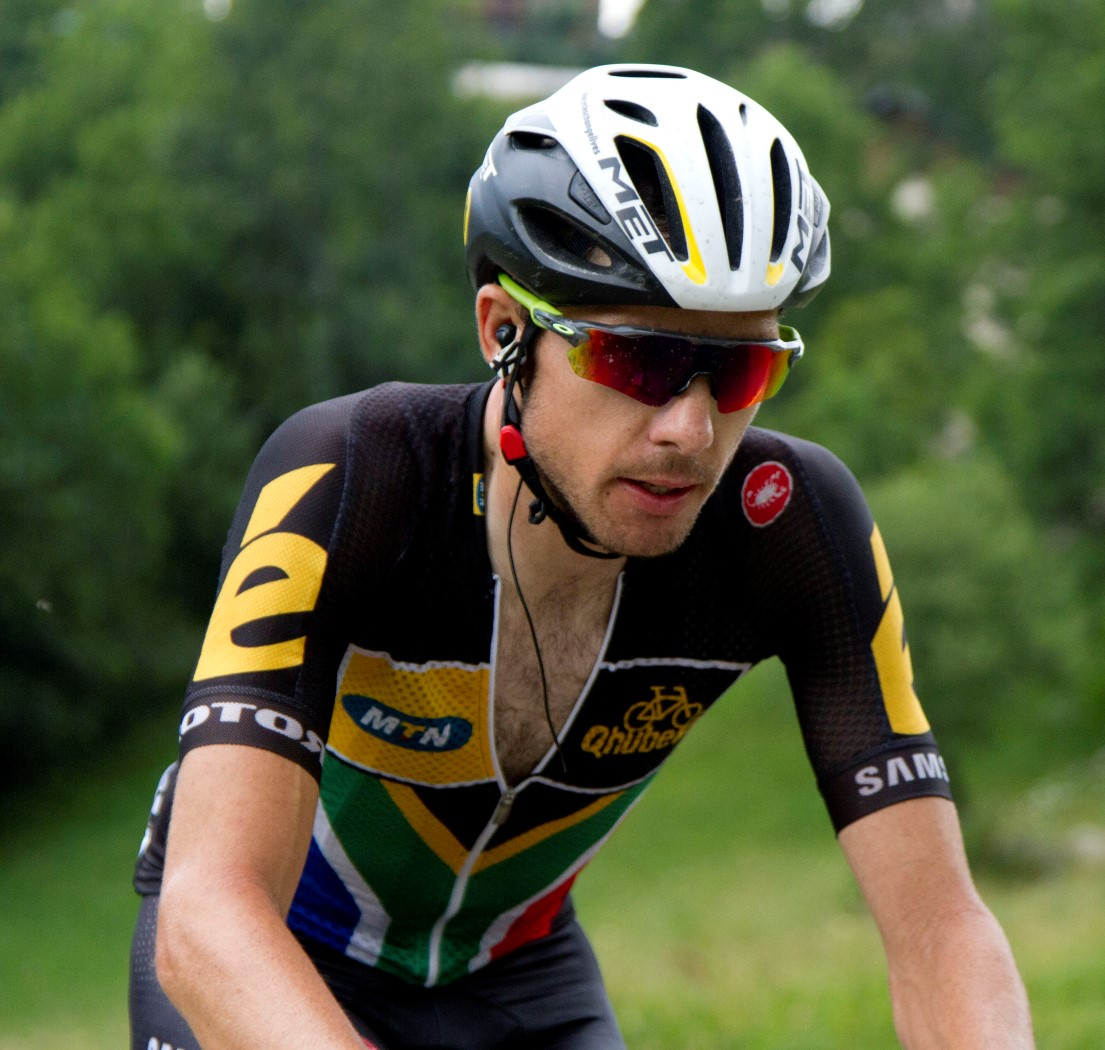
- Janse van Rensburg at the 2015 Tour de France in his National champions jersey

Personal information
- Full name: Jacques Janse van Rensburg
- Born: 6 September 1987 (age 39) Springs, Gauteng, South Africa
- Height: 175 cm (5 ft 9 in)
- Weight: 63 kg (139 lb)

Cycling career
- Sport: Cycling
- Current team: TEG Pro Cycling Team
- Disciplines: Road; Mountain biking
- Role: Rider

Amateur teams
- 2020: First Move
- 2021: DSV
- 2022–: TEG Pro Cycling

Professional teams
- 2006: Team Konica Minolta
- 2007–2008: Neotel
- 2009: Trek–Marco Polo
- 2010: DCM Chrome
- 2011: Burgos 2016–Castilla y León
- 2012–2019: MTN–Qhubeka

Major wins
- One-day races and Classics National Road Race Championships (2015)

Jacques Janse van Rensburg (born 6 September 1987) is a South African racing cyclist, who rides for South African amateur team TEG Pro Cycling Team. In 2015, he won the South African National Road Race Championships.

During his eight years with Team Dimension Data (2012–2019), Janse van Rensburg rode in six Grand Tours: the Vuelta a España in 2014, 2016 and 2017, the 2015 Tour de France, and the Giro d'Italia in 2017, and 2018.

== Personal life ==
He is of no relation to fellow South African professional cyclist Reinardt Janse van Rensburg.

== Major results ==
2004
2nd Road race, National Junior Road Championships
2005
1st Road race, National Junior Road Championships
2008
3rd Overall Giro del Capo
10th Overall Grand Prix du Portugal
2009
6th Overall Tour de Langkawi
2010
6th Overall Tour de Filipinas
2011
6th Overall Tour of South Africa
2012
1st Overall Tour of Eritrea

1st Stage 2

2014
1st Overall Mzansi Tour

1st Stage 1

6th Overall Tour de Langkawi
2015
1st Road race, National Road Championships
3rd Road race, African Road Championships
5th Overall Tour of Oman
9th Overall Tour de Langkawi
2016
1st Combativity classification, Tour of Oman
2017
5th Road race, National Road Championships
2018
2nd Road race, National Road Championships
2022
6th Road race, National Road Championships

=== Grand Tour general classification results timeline ===
Grand Tour	2014	2015	2016	2017	2018
Giro d'Italia	—	—	—	36	78
Tour de France	—	51	—	—	—
Vuelta a España	59	—	DNF	82	—

Legend
—	Did not compete
DNF	Did not finish
