= Stefan de Bod =

South African cyclist (born 1996)

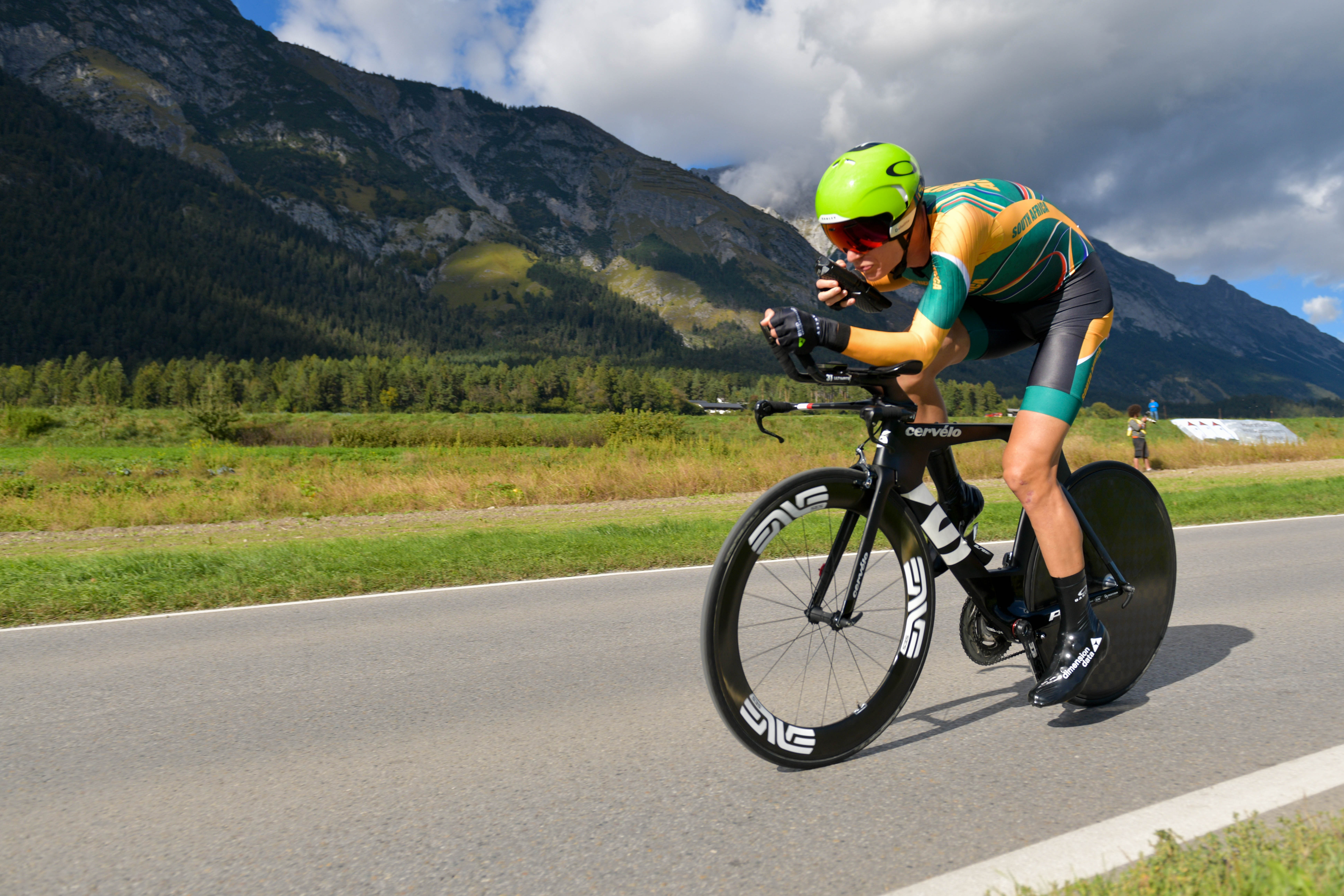
- De Bod at the 2018 World Championships

Personal information
- Born: 17 November 1996 (age 29) Worcester, Western Cape, South Africa
- Height: 1.82 m (6 ft 0 in)
- Weight: 66 kg (146 lb)

Cycling career
- Sport: Cycling
- Current team: Modern Adventure Pro Cycling
- Discipline: Road
- Role: Rider

Amateur team
- 2015: MTN–Qhubeka–WCC Africa

Professional teams
- 2016–2018: Dimension Data for Qhubeka
- 2019–2020: Team Dimension Data
- 2021–2022: Astana–Premier Tech
- 2023–2024: EF Education–EasyPost
- 2025: Terengganu Cycling Team
- 2026–: Modern Adventure Pro Cycling

Major wins
- One-day races and Classics National Time Trial Championships (2023, 2026)

Stefan de Bod (born 17 November 1996) is a South African cyclist, who rides for UCI ProTeam Modern Adventure Pro Cycling.

== Career ==
De Bod was born in Worcester, Western Cape and was schooled at Paul Roos Gymnasium, in Stellenbosch. Before joining Team Dimension Data in 2019, de Bod had spent three seasons with their development team Dimension Data for Qhubeka. In October 2020, he was named in the startlist for the 2020 Vuelta a España.

In November 2020, de Bod signed a two-year contract with the Astana–Premier Tech team, from the 2021 season.

== Major results ==
=== Road ===
2014
1st Team time trial, African Youth Games
National Junior Championships

1st Road race
3rd Time trial

2015
1st 947 Cycle Challenge
4th PMB Road Classic, KZN Autumn Series
2016
National Championships

1st Under-23 road race
1st Under-23 time trial
2nd Road race
2nd Time trial

2017
National Championships

1st Under-23 road race
1st Under-23 time trial
2nd Road race
2nd Time trial

2nd Time trial, African Championships
2018
National Under-23 Championships

1st Time trial
5th Road race

1st Gran Premio Palio del Recioto
2nd Trofeo Alcide Degasperi
8th Time trial, UCI World Under-23 Championships
8th Piccolo Giro di Lombardia
2019 (1 pro win)
1st Time trial, African Championships
National Championships

2nd Time trial
3rd Road race

3rd Overall Tour of Austria
2020
2nd Time trial, National Championships
2021
5th Overall Tour de Hongrie
2022
4th Overall Sibiu Cycling Tour
4th Overall Okolo Slovenska
6th Overall Vuelta a Castilla y León
2023 (1)
1st Time trial, National Championships
6th Chrono des Nations
2025
1st Grand Prix Syedra Ancient City
1st Tour of Mersin
2nd Time trial, National Championships
2026 (1)
1st Time trial, National Championships
4th Overall AlUla Tour
10th Overall Tour Poitou-Charentes en Nouvelle-Aquitaine

==== Grand Tour general classification results timeline ====
Grand Tour	2020	2021	2022	2023	2024
Giro d'Italia	—	—	—	DNF	80
Tour de France	—	DNF	—	—	—
Vuelta a España	94	—	—	—	—

Legend
—	Did not compete
DNF	Did not finish

=== Track ===
2014
National Junior Championships

1st Scratch
1st Individual pursuit

2015
1st Team pursuit, African Championships
