= Malcolm Lange =

South African cyclist

Personal information
- Born: 22 November 1973 (age 52) Johannesburg, South Africa
- Height: 1.77 m (5 ft 10 in)

Cycling career
- Sport: Cycling
- Current team: Retired
- Discipline: Road
- Role: Rider

Professional teams
- 1996: Vosschemie–Zetelhallen
- 1997–1999: AIG
- 2000–2002: HSBC Team
- 2003–2006: Microsoft
- 2007–2008: MTN
- 2009–2011: Team Medscheme

Managerial team
- 2012–2016: Team Bonitas

Malcolm Lange (born 22 November 1973) is a South African former professional racing cyclist. He won the South African National Road Race Championships on three occasions. He also rode in two events at the 1992 Summer Olympics.

== Major results ==
1991
1st Amashova Durban Classic
1995
1st Road race, National Road Championships
1st Amashova Durban Classic
2nd Grand Prix Criquielion
1997
1st Time trial, National Road Championships
1998
National Road Championships

1st Time trial
3rd Road race

1st Amashova Durban Classic
1st Prologue & Stage 5 Giro del Capo
1999
1st Road race, National Road Championships
1st Stage 1 Rapport Toer
2nd Road race, All-Africa Games
2000
1st Stages 1 & 3 Giro del Capo
3rd Overall Tour of South China Sea

1st Stages 5 & 7

2001
1st Amashova Durban Classic
4th Road race, National Road Championships
2002
1st Amashova Durban Classic
2003
1st Road race, All-Africa Games
2nd Road race, National Road Championships
2004
Tour de Tunisie

1st Points classification
1st Stages 2, 6 & 10

2006
1st Stage 1 Giro del Capo
2007
1st Road race, National Road Championships
5th Overall Tour du Maroc

1st Stages 6, 7 & 8

5th Powerade Dome 2 Dome Cycling Spectacular
2008
1st Amashovashova National Classic
2nd Powerade Dome 2 Dome Cycling Spectacular
7th Overall Tour du Maroc

1st Stages 3, 5 & 8

8th Overall La Tropicale Amissa Bongo
2010
1st Emirates Cup
2nd Tour de Delhi
2nd H. H. Vice-President's Cup
5th Overall Jelajah Malaysia

1st Stage 3

2010
6th Tour de Mumbai II
8th Tour de Mumbai I
