= Anriette Schoeman =

South African cyclist

Personal information
- Born: 25 August 1977 (age 49) South Africa

Cycling career
- Sport: Cycling
- Discipline: Road cycling

Professional team
- 2010: Lotto Ladies Team

Anriette Schoeman (born 25 August 1977) is a road cyclist from South Africa. She represented her nation at the 2001, 2006, 2008 and 2010 UCI Road World Championships. She also competed in the women's individual road race at the 2004 Summer Olympics.
