= Arran Brown =

South African professional road cyclist

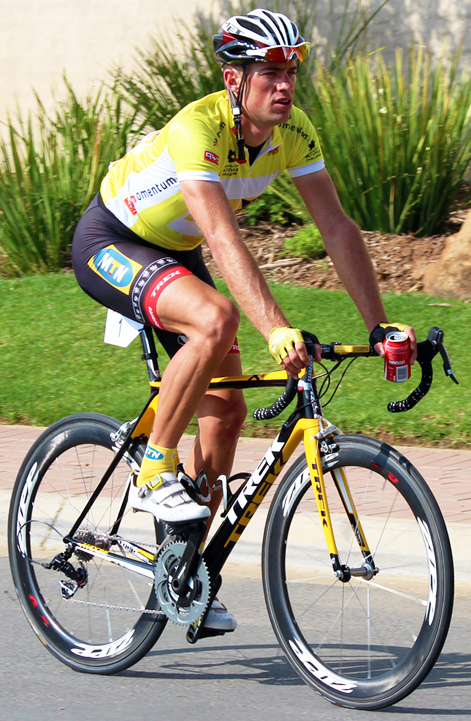
- Brown after the 2012 Momentum 94.7 Cycle Challenge, South Africa

Personal information
- Full name: Arran Brown
- Born: 24 March 1985 (age 41) Johannesburg, South Africa
- Height: 1.85 m (6 ft 1 in)
- Weight: 75 kg (165 lb)

Cycling career
- Sport: Cycling
- Current team: Team Cycle Fit - RoadCover
- Discipline: Road
- Role: Rider
- Rider type: Sprinter

Amateur teams
- 2007: Colorpress Cyclingnews
- 2008: House of Paint
- 2009–2010: Team Medscheme

Professional team
- 2011–2012: MTN–Qhubeka

Major wins
- RSA National U/23 Time Trial Champion (2007); Tour of Delhi (2010); Tour du Maroc, 6 stages (2011–2012); Points Classification Tour du Maroc (2011)

Arran Brown (born 24 March 1985 in Johannesburg) is a South African professional road cyclist, riding for Team Cycle Fit - RoadCover. Brown started cycling at the age of 16 and joined his first professional team at the age of 20. In 2007 he won his first major race, the South African National U/23 Time Trial Championships. In the same year he also placed third in the South African National U/23 Road Race Championships. 2009 was another major year for Brown as he became South Africa's first "Triple Crown" winner, winning the Cape Argus Cycle Tour, the MTN Amashovashova Classic and the Momentum 94.7 Cycle Challenge.

Brown is the owner of South African cycling set-up company, AB Cycle Fit and is assisted by fellow professional cyclist Richard Baxter. On 18 November 2012, Brown and Baxter announced the formation of the Cycle Fit team. The team will only be racing locally in South Africa in 2013, with the intention of winning the local races.

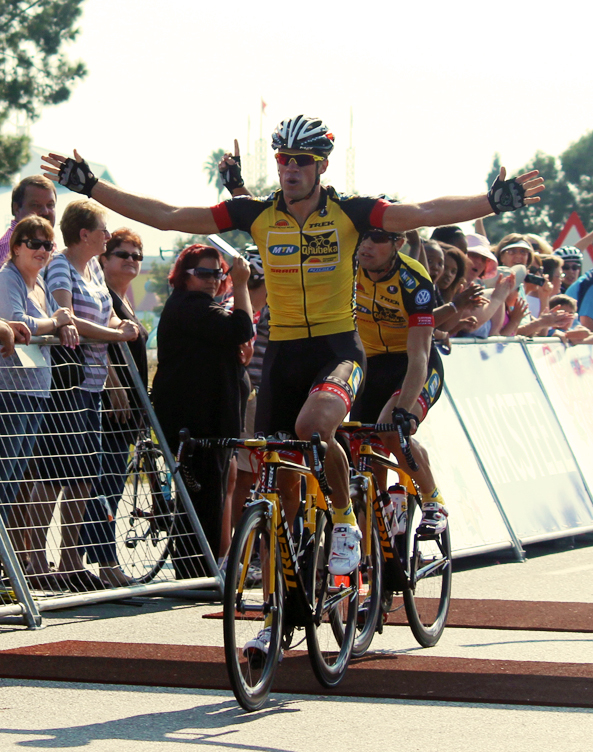
Brown winning the 2012 Carnival City Macsteel National Classic

== Achievements ==
2007
1st SA National U/23 Time Trial Championships
3rd SA National U/23 Road Race Championships
2008
2nd Amashovashova National Classic
2009
1st Cape Argus Cycle Tour
1st 94.7 Cycle Challenge
1st MTN Amashovashova Classic
1st Alpha Pharm Seeding Series
2010
1st Tour of Delhi
1st MTN Amashovashova Classic
1st MTN OFM Classic
2nd 94.7 Cycle Challenge
2011
1st 94.7 Cycle Challenge
Tour du Maroc

1st Points classification
1st Stages 3 & 9

1st Pick 'n Pay Knysna Oyster Festival Cycle Classic
1st Engen Dynamic Cycle Challenge
1st Stage 5 Tour of Free State
1st Race 4 Victory
2nd Tour Durban Road Race
2nd Carousel Classic
2nd Randfontein EPR
2012
Tour du Maroc

1st Stages 3, 4, 9 & 10

1st Dischem Ride for Sight
1st Carnival City Macsteel National Classic
1st MTN OFM Classic
2nd VW EP Herald
3rd The Fast One
3rd 94.7 Cycle Challenge
