= Nicholas White (South African cyclist) =

South African cyclist (born 1974)

Personal information
- Born: January 8, 1974 (age 52) Pretoria, South Africa

Cycling career
- Sport: Cycling
- Discipline: Road
- Role: Rider
- Rider type: All-rounder

Professional teams
- 2001–2004: HSBC
- 2007–2008: MTN
- 2009: Team Medscheme

Major wins
- African Champion Road Race; Cameroon 2007; UCI Africa Tour winner 07/08; 2005 Absa Cape Epic Mixed Category Winner

Nicholas "Nic" Patrick White (born 8 January 1974) is a South African former racing cyclist.

White won the UCI Africa Tour series in 2007/8 season and the African Road Championship in Cameroon in 2007.

In 2008 White competed in the Absa Cape Epic with partner Anke Erlank, placing 1st in the Mixed Category.

== Major results ==
1998
3rd National Time Trial Championships
1999
1st Pick n Pay Amashovashova National Classic
3rd Overall Rapport Toer

1st Stage 2

3rd Overall Giro del Capo
2000
1st Overall Giro del Capo

1st Stage 6

1st Stage 1 Tour of South China Sea
2001
2nd Overall FBD Insurance Rás

1st Stage 7

2nd Overall Giro del Capo

1st Stage 5

3rd National Time Trial Championships
2002
1st Overall Tour of South China Sea

1st Stage 1

1st Stage 5 Tour de Serbie
2nd National Time Trial Championships
2003
3rd National Time Trial Championships
2004
1st Overall Mi-Août en Bretagne
1st Stage 6 Ruban Granitier Breton
3rd National Time Trial Championships
3rd National Road Race Championships
5th Overall Tour de Langkawi
2006
2nd National Time Trial Championships
2007
African Road Championships

1st Road race
1st Time trial

1st Overall Tour du Maroc

1st Stage 1a

3rd National Time Trial Championships
8th Overall Giro del Capo
2008
1st Overall UCI Africa Tour
2nd Time trial, African Road Championships
2nd National Time Trial Championships
3rd Intaka Tech Worlds View Challenge 1
4th Overall La Tropicale Amissa Bongo
6th Overall Tour du Maroc

1st Stage 9

9th Overall Giro del Capo
2010
2nd National Road Race Championships
2nd Overall Tour of Thailand
6th H. H. Vice-President's Cup
