= Reinardt Janse van Rensburg =

South African cyclist

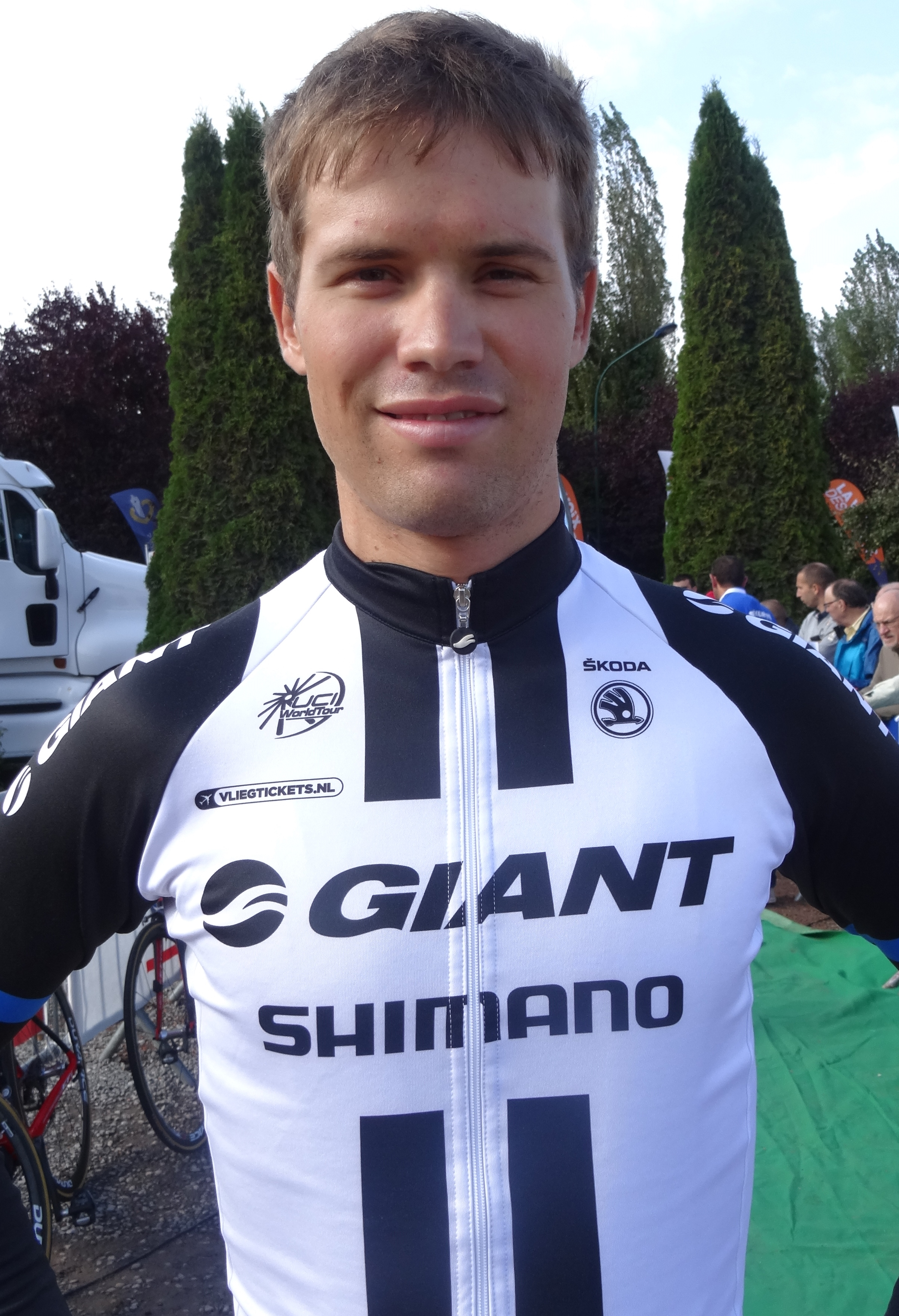
- Janse van Rensburg in 2014.

Personal information
- Full name: Reinardt Janse van Rensburg
- Nickname: Reinie
- Born: 3 February 1989 (age 37) Virginia, South Africa
- Height: 1.81 m (5 ft 11 1/2 in)
- Weight: 74 kg (163 lb; 11 st 9 lb)

Cycling career
- Sport: Cycling
- Current team: Tshenolo Pro Cycling Team
- Discipline: Road
- Role: Rider
- Rider type: Sprinter; Classics rider

Amateur team
- 2025–: Tshenolo Pro Cycling Team

Professional teams
- 2010–2012: MTN–Energade
- 2013–2014: Argos–Shimano
- 2015–2021: MTN–Qhubeka
- 2022: Lotto–Soudal
- 2023: Denver Disruptors
- 2024: China Glory–Mentech Continental Cycling Team

Major wins
- Stage races Tour de Langkawi (2016) One-day races and Classics National Road Race Championships (2017, 2022) National Time Trial Championships (2012)
Medal record
Men's road cycling
Representing South Africa
All-Africa Games
Gold medal – first place	2011 Maputo	Time trial
Gold medal – first place	2011 Maputo	Team time trial
Bronze medal – third place	2011 Maputo	Road race
African Road Championships
Gold medal – first place	2009 Windhoek	Team time trial
Silver medal – second place	2009 Windhoek	Time trial
Silver medal – second place	2010 Kigali	Time trial
Silver medal – second place	2011 Asmara	Team time trial
Silver medal – second place	2015 Wartburg	Team time trial
Silver medal – second place	2022 Sharm-el-Sheikh	Road race
Silver medal – second place	2022 Sharm-el-Sheikh	Team time trial
Bronze medal – third place	2011 Asmara	Road race
Bronze medal – third place	2011 Asmara	Time trial
Bronze medal – third place	2015 Wartburg	Time trial

Reinardt Janse van Rensburg (born 3 February 1989) is a South African professional road bicycle racer, who currently rides for club team Tshenolo Pro Cycling Team. A two-time winner of the South African National Road Race Championships, Janse van Rensburg has competed professionally since 2010, having rode for Giant–Shimano (2013–2014), Team Qhubeka NextHash (2010–2012 and 2015–2021), and Lotto–Soudal (2022).

== Career ==
Born in Virginia, Free State, Janse van Rensburg competed with MTN–Energade from 2010 to 2012.

Janse van Rensburg left MTN–Qhubeka at the end of the 2012 season, and joined Argos–Shimano for the 2013 season. Subsequently, it was announced that he would be rejoining MTN–Qhubeka for 2015. He was named in the start list for the 2015 Tour de France and the start list for the 2016 Tour de France.

== Personal life ==
He is not related to fellow professional cyclist and former teammate Jacques Janse van Rensburg.

== Major results ==
2007
2nd Time trial, National Junior Road Championships
2009
African Road Championships

1st Team time trial
2nd Time trial
9th Road race

2010
National Under-23 Road Championships

1st Time trial
3rd Road race

African Road Championships

2nd Time trial
7th Road race

3rd Overall Tour du Rwanda

1st Stage 1

6th Overall Tour du Maroc
2011
All-Africa Games

1st Time trial
1st Team time trial
3rd Road race

1st Stage 2 Tour du Maroc
African Road Championships

2nd Team time trial
3rd Road race
3rd Time trial

2nd Overall Tour of Hainan
4th Overall Herald Sun Tour

1st Stage 2

6th Overall La Tropicale Amissa Bongo
6th Overall Tour of Azerbaijan (Iran)
2012
National Road Championships

1st Time trial
2nd Road race

1st Overall Tour du Maroc

1st Points classification
1st Stages 1, 5, 6 & 8

1st Overall Tour de Bretagne

1st Stage 4

1st Overall Ronde van Overijssel

1st Prologue

1st Circuit de Wallonie
1st Ronde van Zeeland Seaports
1st Cape Argus Cycle Race
1st 947 Cycle Challenge
Volta a Portugal

1st Points classification
1st Prologue & Stage 10

4th Overall Tour de Gironde

1st Points classification

4th Ronde van Noord-Holland
6th Duo Normand (with Jaco Venter)
10th Overall Flèche du Sud

1st Points classification

2013
1st Binche–Chimay–Binche
2nd Clásica de Almería
3rd Nationale Sluitingsprijs
2014
5th Grand Prix d'Isbergues
2015
African Road Championships

2nd Team time trial
3rd Time trial
4th Road race

National Road Championships

2nd Time trial
4th Road race

2016
1st Overall Tour de Langkawi
National Road Championships

3rd Road race
3rd Time trial

2017
National Road Championships

1st Road race
3rd Time trial

5th Grand Prix of Aargau Canton
7th Scheldeprijs
9th Overall Dubai Tour
2018
7th Overall Deutschland Tour
7th Tour de l'Eurométropole
2019
3rd Grand Prix of Aargau Canton
4th Road race, National Road Championships
2020
7th Grand Prix d'Isbergues
2021
4th Trofeo Alcúdia – Port d'Alcúdia
4th Ronde van Limburg
9th Eurométropole Tour
2022
National Road Championships

1st Road race
5th Time trial

African Road Championships

2nd Road race
2nd Team time trial
6th Time trial

8th Grand Prix d'Isbergues
2023
National Road Championships

1st Criterium
2nd Road race

2nd Overall Tucson Bicycle Classic

1st Stage 3

2025

1st Overall Tour du Bénin
1st Points classification
1st Stages 1 & 5

1st Grand Prix de Cotonou

=== Grand Tour general classification results timeline ===
Grand Tour	2013	2014	2015	2016	2017	2018	2019	2020	2021	2022
Giro d'Italia	Has not contested during career									
Tour de France	—	—	96	115	118	110	124	—	—	133
Vuelta a España	98	—	—	—	—	—	—	103	DNF	—

Legend
—	Did not compete
DNF	Did not finish
