= Jay Thomson =

South African cyclist

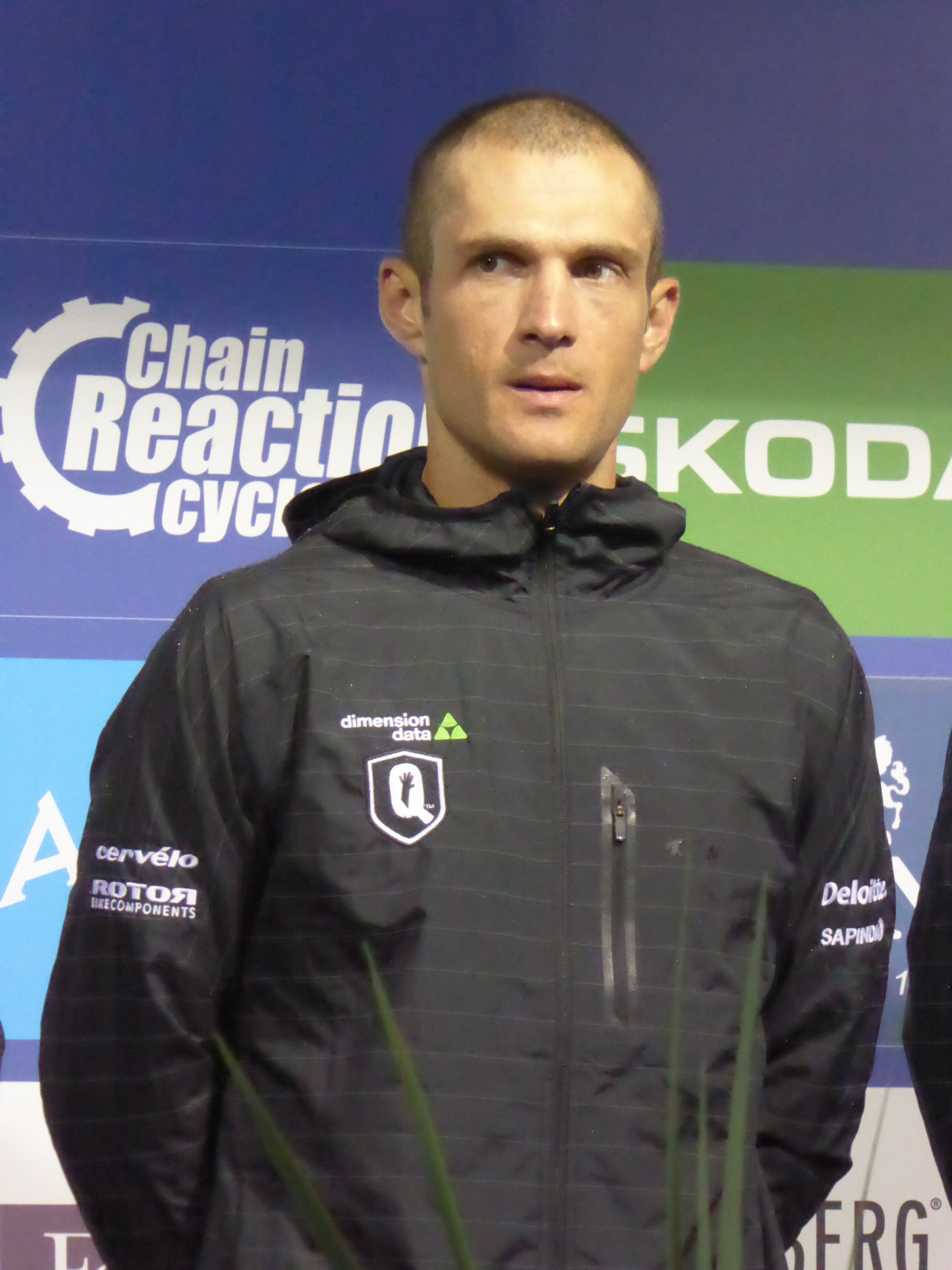
- Thomson in 2016

Personal information
- Full name: Jay Robert Thomson
- Born: 12 April 1986 (age 40) Krugersdorp, South Africa
- Height: 1.85 m (6 ft 1 in)
- Weight: 75 kg (165 lb; 11 st 11 lb)

Cycling career
- Sport: Cycling
- Current team: Retired
- Discipline: Road
- Role: Rider

Professional teams
- 2007: Team Konica Minolta
- 2008–2009: Team MTN
- 2010: Fly V Australia
- 2011: Bissell
- 2012: UnitedHealthcare
- 2013–2020: MTN–Qhubeka

Jay Robert Thomson (born 12 April 1986) is a South African former professional racing cyclist, who rode professionally between 2007 and 2020, for the Team Konica Minolta, Fly V Australia, Bissell, UnitedHealthcare and NTT Pro Cycling teams. In 2013 he won the South African National Road Race Championships. He rode in the 2014 Vuelta a España. He was named in the start list for the 2016 Giro d'Italia. In July 2018, he was named in the start list for the 2018 Tour de France.

== Major results ==
2006
6th Road race, African Road Championships
2007
3rd Road race, African Road Championships
2008
African Road Championships

1st Time trial
7th Road race

1st Overall Tour d'Egypte

1st Stages 1 & 2

7th Overall Coupe des nations Ville Saguenay
2009
African Road Championships

1st Time trial
1st Team time trial
2nd Road race

2010
1st Stage 2 Tour de Langkawi
3rd Overall Tour of Wellington

1st Stage 3

3rd Tour of the Battenkill
2011
2nd Road race, All-Africa Games
2nd Time trial, National Road Championships
2012
1st Stage 1 Volta a Portugal
African Road Championships

2nd Road race
3rd Time trial

2nd Time trial, National Road Championships
2013
National Road Championships

1st Road race
2nd Time trial

1st Stage 1 Tour of Rwanda
2014
National Road Championships

2nd Time trial
3rd Road race

2015
African Road Championships

2nd Road race
2nd Team time trial

4th Time trial, National Road Championships

=== Grand Tour general classification results timeline ===
Grand Tour	2014	2015	2016	2017	2018
Giro d'Italia	—	—	149	—	—
Tour de France	—	—	—	—	143
Vuelta a España	155	123	—	—	—

Legend
—	Did not compete
DNF	Did not finish
