= Team Konica Minolta–Bizhub =

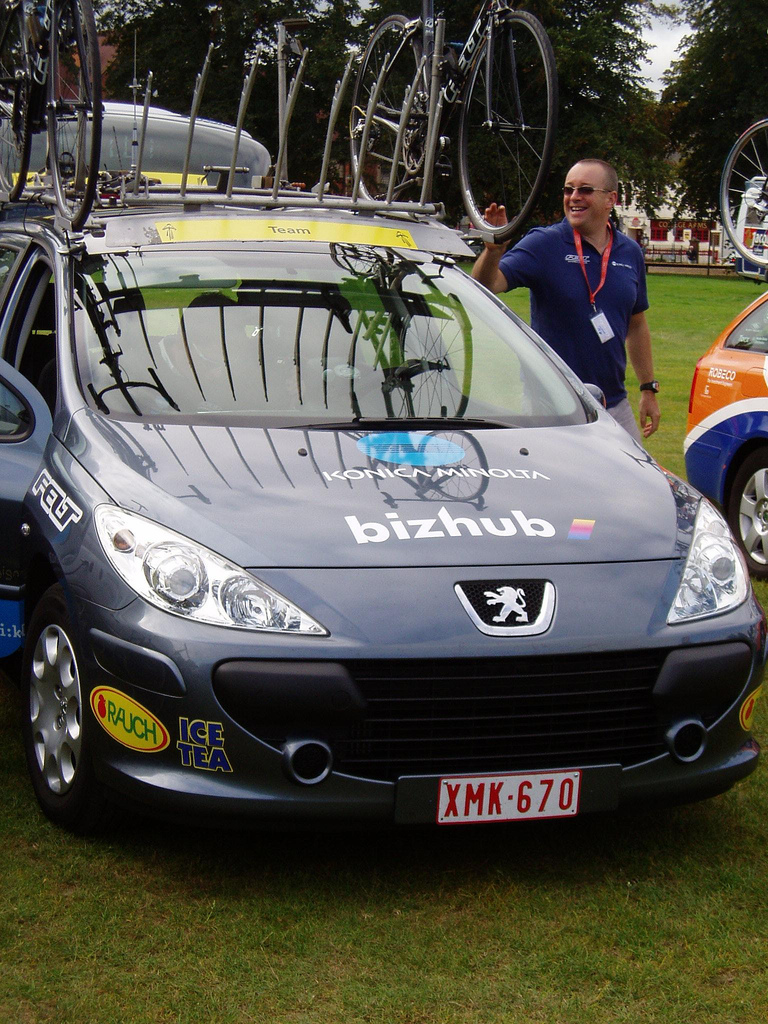
- The support car in the 2007 season

Team information
- UCI code: KON
- Registered: South Africa
- Founded: 2005
- Disbanded: 2009
- Discipline: Road
- Status: UCI Continental

Key personnel
- General manager: Conrad Venter
- Team manager: John Robertson

Team name history
- 2005–2007 2008–2009: Team Konica Minolta; Team Konica Minolta–Bizhub

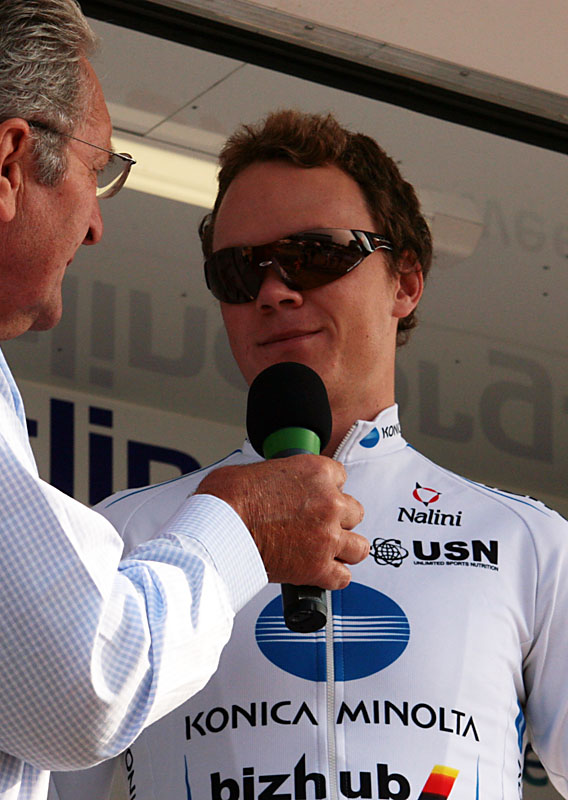
Chris Froome at the 2007 Tour of Britain

Team Konica Minolta–Bizhub (UCI team code: KON) was a South African cycling team that participated in the UCI Continental Circuits, primarily in the UCI Africa Tour, from 2005 until the end of the 2009 season. The team's main sponsor was Japanese technology company Konica Minolta. Notable former riders include four-time Tour de France winner Chris Froome, who rode for the team in 2007.

== 2009 squad ==
As of 1 January 2009.

Rider	Date of birth
Mauritz Faber (RSA)	14 April 1989 (aged 19)
Kosie Loubser (RSA)	3 January 1977 (aged 31)
Casey Munro (AUS)	24 January 1985 (aged 23)
Tim Oliver Schlichting (GER)	24 June 1990 (aged 18)
Pieter Seyffert (RSA)	27 December 1986 (aged 22)

Rider	Date of birth
Tiaan Swart (RSA)	14 March 1990 (aged 18)
Ab Van Der Walt (NED)	4 July 1989 (aged 19)
Dennis Van Niekerk (RSA)	19 October 1984 (aged 24)
Paul Van Zweel (RSA)	5 April 1990 (aged 18)
Shaun Ward (RSA)	25 July 1985 (aged 23)

== Major wins ==
2005
Stage 3a Giro del Capo, Martin Velits
Stage 6 Vuelta Ciclista a Navarra, Peter Velits
2006
Overall Giro del Capo, Peter Velits

Stage 2, Peter Velits

Stage 6 Tour of Japan, John-Lee Augustyn
GP Kooperativa, Peter Velits
Stage 2 GP Tell, Peter Velits
2007
Stage 6 Tour of Japan, Chris Froome
2008
Tour de Hong Kong Shanghai

Overall, Christoff van Heerden
Stages 1, 2 & 5, Christoff van Heerden
Stage 3b, Adam Blythe
