= Giro del Capo =

Race details
- Date: March
- Region: around Cape Town, South Africa
- Local name(s): Giro del Capo
- Discipline: Road
- Competition: UCI Africa Tour 2.2
- Type: Stage race

History
- First edition: 1992
- Editions: 19
- Final edition: 2010
- First winner: Andrew Maclean (RSA)
- Most wins: Andrew Maclean (RSA); David George (RSA) (both 4)
- Final winner: David George (RSA)

The Giro del Capo was a road cycling stage race held in the vicinity of Cape Town, South Africa. The 2009 edition was held in the form of four challenges. The last edition, held in 2010, was ranked as 2.2 by the UCI and was part of the UCI Africa Tour.

== Winners ==
Year	Winner	Second	Third
1992	Andrew Maclean (RSA)		
1993	Andrew Maclean (RSA)	Willy Engelbrecht (RSA)	Mikhail Teteriouk (KAZ)
1994	Andrew Maclean (RSA)		
1995	Michael Andersson (SWE)	Alexander Vinokourov (KAZ)	
1996	Scott Mercier (USA)	Andrew Maclean (RSA)	Sergueï Ivanov (RUS)
1997	Andrew Maclean (RSA)	Matt White (AUS)	Paul Brosnan (AUS)
1998	Timothy Jones (ZIM)	Harald Morscher (AUT)	Salvatore Commesso (ITA)
1999	Davy Dubbeldam (NED)	David George (RSA)	Nicolas White (RSA)
2000	Nicolas White (RSA)	Kosie Loubser (RSA)	Jac-Louis Van Wyck (RSA)
2001	Piotr Chmielewski (POL)	Nicolas White (RSA)	Lubor Tesař (CZE)
2002	David George (RSA)	Daniel Spence (RSA)	Piotr Chmielewski (POL)
2003	David George (RSA)	Darren Lill (RSA)	Jacobus Odendaal (RSA)
2004	David George (RSA)	Neil MacDonald (RSA)	Lubor Tesař (CZE)
2005	Tiaan Kannemeyer (RSA)	Ryan Cox (RSA)	David Kopp (GER)
2006	Peter Velits (SVK)	David George (RSA)	Ryan Cox (RSA)
2007	Alexander Efimkin (RUS)	Félix Cardenas (COL)	David George (RSA)
2008	Christian Pfannberger (AUT)	Chris Froome (GBR)	Jacques Janse van Rensburg (RSA)

Year	Challenge 1	Challenge 2	Challenge 3	Challenge 4
2009	Robert Hunter (RSA)	Chris Froome (GBR)	Steve Cummings (GBR)	Arran Brown (RSA)

Year	First	Second	Third
2010	David George (RSA)	Kevin Evans (RSA)	Burry Stander (RSA)
