= Gregory de Vink =

South African cyclist (1998–2020)

Personal information
- Born: 6 July 1998 Somerset West, South Africa
- Died: 4 September 2020 (aged 22)

Cycling career
- Sport: Cycling

Amateur teams
- 2017: Leadout Aspire
- 2018: Vélo Club La Pomme Marseille
- 2018–2019: Mad Macs
- 2019–2020: Vélo Club La Pomme Marseille

Gregory de Vink (6 July 1998 – 4 September 2020) was a South African racing cyclist.

== Biography ==
In 2015, de Vink became the champion of the Junior African Road Championships in road race and time trial. He also won the South African National Time Trial Championships at junior level. In September of that year, he finished 42nd in the time trial at the 2015 UCI Road World Championships in Richmond, Virginia, more than four minutes behind winner Leo Appelt.

De Vink moved to the under-23 category in 2017 and joined the new team Leadout Aspire. During that summer, he participated in a few events in Belgium, winning in Sint-Niklaas on 22 July. The next year, he signed with the French team Vélo Club La Pomme Marseille. That year, he scored 3rd place at the South African Championships in the U21 category. On 14 July, he finished 8th in the Grand Prix de Charvieu-Chavagneux. Fifteen days later, he took 2nd in the Grand Prix de Cabannes, behind his teammate Jonathan Couanon. In September, he finished 3rd in the Tour de Maurice.

In 2019, de Vink competed at the Provincial Championships of Western Cape, finishing 2nd in the time trial. He was also co-champion of the South African National Road Race Championships. Upon his return to France, he finished 12th in the final stage of the Boucles du Haut-Var.

== Death ==
Gregory de Vink died in a motorcycle accident on 4 September 2020 at the age of 22.

== Major results ==
2015
African Junior Road Championships

1st Time trial
1st Team time trial

1st Time trial, National Junior Road Championships
2016
1st Time trial, National Junior Road Championships
2018
3rd Time trial, National Under-23 Road Championships
2019
2nd Time trial, National Under-23 Road Championships
