= Eritrea at the 2023 African Games =

- Flag of Eritrea
- IOC code: ERI
- NOC: Eritrean National Olympic Committee

in Accra, Ghana 8 March 2024 – 23 March 2024
- Competitors: 34 in 4 sports
- Medals Ranked 11th: Gold 7 Silver 2 Bronze 6 Total 15

African Games appearances
- 2007; 2011; 2015; 2019; 2023

Eritrea competed at the 2023 African Games held from 8 to 23 March 2024 in Accra, Ghana. Eritrea competed in 4 sports.

== Medal table ==
Medal	Name	Sport	Event	Date
Gold	Nahom Zerai	Cycling	Men's elites	12 March
Gold	Nahom Zerai	Cycling	Men's U23	12 March
Gold	Adiam Mengs	Cycling	Women's U23	12 March
Gold	Dawit Yemane; Merhawi Kudus; Milkias Maekele; Nahom Zerai	Cycling	Men's team time trial	14 March
Gold	Adiam Mengs; Birikti Fessehaye; Monaliza Chneslasie; Suzana Chineslasie	Cycling	Women's team time trial	14 March
Gold	Adiam Mengs	Cycling	Women's individual time trial U23	15 March
Gold	Samson Hailemichael	Athletics	Men's half marathon	22 March
Silver	Adiam Mengs	Cycling	Women's road race U23	9 March
Silver	Merhawi Kudus	Cycling	Men's elites	12 March
Bronze	Monaliza Chneslasie	Cycling	Women's road race U23	9 March
Bronze	Merhawi Kudus	Cycling	Men's road race	10 March
Bronze	Nahom Zerai	Cycling	Men's road race U23	10 March
Bronze	Ksanet Teages	Cycling	Women's U23	12 March
Bronze	Suzana Chineslasie	Cycling	Women's individual time trial U23	15 March
