= African Road Championships =

Series of cycling races held annually in Africa

The African Continental Cycling Championships are a series of cycling races held annually in Africa where the African cyclists decide who will be the champion for the year to come. They have been held since 2001.

== Editions ==
Editions	Year	Host country	Host city
	2001	South Africa	
I	2005	Egypt	
II	2006	Mauritius	Port Louis
III	2007	Cameroon	Yaoundé
IV	2008	Morocco	Casablanca
V	2009	Namibia	Windhoek
VI	2010	Rwanda	Kigali
VII	2011	Eritrea	Asmara
VIII	2012	Burkina Faso	Ouagadougou

Editions	Year	Host country	Host city
IX	2013	Egypt	Sharm El Sheikh
X	2015	South Africa	Wartburg
XI	2016	Morocco	Benslimane
XII	2017	Egypt	Luxor
XIII	2018	Rwanda	Kigali
XIV	2019	Ethiopia	Bahir Dar
XV	2021	Egypt	Cairo
XVI	2022	Egypt	Sharm El Sheikh
XVII	2023	Ghana	Accra
XVIII	2024	Kenya	Eldoret
XIX	2025	Kenya	Kwale
XX	2026	Kenya	Kisumu

== Men ==
=== Road Race ===
Year	Gold	Silver	Bronze
2001	(South Africa) Jacques Fullard	(South Africa) Douglas Ryder	(South Africa) Ross Grant
2005	(South Africa) Rupert Rheeder	(Mauritius) Thomas Desvaux	(Egypt) Mohamed Abdel Aziz
2006	(South Africa) Darren Lill	(South Africa) Daniel Spence	(South Africa) Robert Hunter
2007	(South Africa) Nicholas White	(South Africa) Johann Rabie	(South Africa) Jay Thomson
2008	(Namibia) Dan Craven	(Morocco) Hassan Zahboune	(Algeria) Abdelmalek Madani
2009	(South Africa) Ian McLeod	(South Africa) Jay Thomson	(Namibia) Erik Hoffmann
2010	(Eritrea) Daniel Teklehaimanot	(Eritrea) Meron Russom	(Namibia) Dan Craven
2011	(Eritrea) Natnael Berhane	(Eritrea) Tesfay Abraha	(South Africa) Jacques Janse van Rensburg
2012	(Eritrea) Natnael Berhane	(South Africa) Jay Thomson	(Eritrea) Fregalsi Debesay
2013	(Eritrea) Tesfom Okubamariam	(Namibia) Dan Craven	(Eritrea) Merhawi Kudus
2015	(South Africa) Louis Meintjes	(South Africa) Jay Thomson	(South Africa) Jacques Janse van Rensburg
2016	(Eritrea) Tesfom Okubamariam	(Algeria) Youcef Reguigui	(Eritrea) Mekseb Debesay
2017	(South Africa) Willie Smit	(Eritrea) Meron Abraham	(Morocco) Ahmed Amine Galdoune
2018	(Eritrea) Amanuel Gebreigzabhier	(Eritrea) Metkel Eyob	(Algeria) Azzedine Lagab
2019	(Eritrea) Mekseb Debesay	(Algeria) Azzedine Lagab	(Algeria) Youcef Reguigui
2021	(South Africa) Ryan Gibbons	(Algeria) Nassim Saidi	(Algeria) Youcef Reguigui
2022	(Eritrea) Henok Mulubrhan	(South Africa) Reinardt Janse van Rensburg	(Algeria) Hamza Amari
2023	(Eritrea) Henok Mulubrhan	(Algeria) Yacine Hamza	(Morocco) Achraf Ed Doghmy
2024	(Eritrea) Henok Mulubrhan	(South Africa) Emile van Niekerk	(Uganda) Charles Kagimu
2025	(Eritrea) Merhawi Kudus	(Eritrea) Awet Aman	(Algeria) Oussama Abdellah Mimouni
2026	(South Africa) Callum Ormiston	(Morocco) Driss El Alouani	(Eritrea) Hebron Berhane

Medallists by nation
Rank	Nation	Gold	Silver	Bronze	Total
1	Eritrea	11	5	4	20
2	South Africa	9	8	5	22
3	Namibia	1	1	2	4
4	Algeria	0	4	6	10
5	Morocco	0	2	2	4
6	Mauritius	0	1	0	1
7	Egypt	0	0	1	1
7	Uganda	0	0	1	1
Totals (8 entries)		21	21	21	63

Updated after the 2026 African Road Championships

=== U23 Road Race ===
Year	Gold	Silver	Bronze
2008	(Algeria) Hichem Chaabane	(Eritrea) Daniel Teklehaimanot	(Algeria) Redouane Chabaane
2009	(Namibia) Lotto Petrus	(South Africa) Reinardt Janse van Rensburg	(Rwanda) Adrien Niyonshuti
2010	(Eritrea) Daniel Teklehaimanot	(South Africa) Reinardt Janse van Rensburg	(Eritrea) Natnael Berhane
2011	(Eritrea) Natnael Berhane	(Eritrea) Tesfay Abraha	(Algeria) Youcef Reguigui
2012	(Eritrea) Natnael Berhane	(Algeria) Hamza Merdj	(South Africa) Songezo Jim
2013	(Eritrea) Tesfom Okubamariam	(Eritrea) Merhawi Kudus	(Rwanda) Janvier Hadi
2015	(South Africa) Jayde Julius	(Eritrea) Merhawi Kudus	(Ethiopia) Temesgen Buru
2016	(Eritrea) Amanuel Gebrezgabihier	(Rwanda) Jean Claude Uwizeye	(Algeria) Nassim Saidi
2017	(Eritrea) Meron Abraham	(Morocco) Ahmed Galdoune	(Rwanda) Joseph Areruya
2018	(Rwanda) Joseph Areruya	(Eritrea) Henok Mulubrhan	(Rwanda) Didier Munyaneza
2019	(Eritrea) Henok Mulubrhan	(Algeria) Yacine Hamza	(Burkina Faso) Paul Daumont
2021	(South Africa) Travis Barrett	(Algeria) Ayoub Sahiri	(Rwanda) Jean Eric Habimana
2022	(Algeria) Hamza Amari	(Algeria) Muhammed Amine Nhari	(South Africa) Tiano Da Silva
2023	(Rwanda) Renus Uhiriwe Byiza	(Eritrea) Aklilu Arefayne	(Algeria) Hamza Amari

=== Time Trial ===
Year	Gold	Silver	Bronze
2001	(South Africa) Simon Kessler	(South Africa) Morne Bester	(Egypt) Mohamed Abdel Fattah
2005	(South Africa) Alex Pavlov	(Tunisia) Rafaâ Chtioui	(South Africa) Rupert Rheeder
2006	(South Africa) Robert Hunter	(Namibia) Dan Craven	(South Africa) Daryl Impey
2007	(South Africa) Nicholas White	(South Africa) Jay Robert Thomson	(Eritrea) Bereket Yemane
2008	(South Africa) Jay Robert Thomson	(South Africa) Nicholas White	(Namibia) Dan Craven
2009	(South Africa) Jay Robert Thomson	(South Africa) Reinardt Janse van Rensburg	(Namibia) Erik Hoffmann
2010	(Eritrea) Daniel Teklehaimanot	(South Africa) Reinardt Janse van Rensburg	(Algeria) Azzedine Lagab
2011	(Eritrea) Daniel Teklehaimanot	(South Africa) Louis Meintjes	(South Africa) Reinardt Janse van Rensburg
2012	(Eritrea) Daniel Teklehaimanot	(Ethiopia) Tsgabu Grmay	(South Africa) Jay Robert Thomson
2013	(Eritrea) Daniel Teklehaimanot	(South Africa) Willie Smit	(South Africa) Johannes Christoffel Nel
2015	(Ethiopia) Tsgabu Grmay	(Eritrea) Daniel Teklehaimanot	(South Africa) Reinardt Janse van Rensburg
2016	(Morocco) Mouhssine Lahsaini	(Ethiopia) Tsgabu Grmay	(Eritrea) Daniel Teklehaimanot
2017	(Eritrea) Meron Teshome	(South Africa) Stefan de Bod	(Eritrea) Awet Habtom
2018	(Eritrea) Mekseb Debesay	(Rwanda) Jean Bosco Nsengimana	(Rwanda) Joseph Areruya
2019	(South Africa) Stefan de Bod	(Eritrea) Sirak Tesfom	(South Africa) Ryan Gibbons
2021	(South Africa) Ryan Gibbons	(South Africa) Kent Main	(Rwanda) Moise Mugisha
2022	(South Africa) Gustav Basson	(Eritrea) Henok Mulubrhan	(Rwanda) Jean Bosco Nsengimana
2023	(Uganda) Charles Kagimu	(Rwanda) Moise Mugisha	(Eritrea) Henok Mulubrhan
2024	(Uganda) Charles Kagimu	(South Africa) Brandon Downes	(Morocco) Adil El Arbaoui
2025	(South Africa) Brandon Downes	(South Africa) Reinardt Janse van Rensburg	(Mauritius) Alexandre Mayer
2026	(Mauritius) Alexandre Mayer	(Eritrea) Merhawi Kudus	(Uganda) Charles Kagimu

Medallists by nation
Rank	Nation	Gold	Silver	Bronze	Total
1	South Africa	10	11	7	28
2	Eritrea	6	4	4	14
3	Uganda	2	0	1	3
4	Ethiopia	1	2	0	3
5	Mauritius	1	0	1	2
5	Morocco	1	0	1	2
7	Rwanda	0	2	3	5
8	Namibia	0	1	2	3
9	Tunisia	0	1	0	1
10	Algeria	0	0	1	1
10	Egypt	0	0	1	1
Totals (11 entries)		21	21	21	63

Updated after the 2026 African Road Championships

=== U23 Time Trial ===
Year	Gold	Silver	Bronze
2008	(South Africa) Jay Robert Thomson	(Eritrea) Daniel Teklehaimanot	(Eritrea) Bereket Yemane
2009	(South Africa) Reinardt Janse van Rensburg	(Namibia) Heiko Redecker	(Rwanda) Adrien Niyonshuti
2010	(Eritrea) Daniel Teklehaimanot	(South Africa) Reinardt Janse van Rensburg	(Ethiopia) Tsgabu Grmay
2011	(South Africa) Louis Meintjes	(Morocco) Reda Aadel	(Algeria) Fayçal Hamza
2012	(Ethiopia) Tsgabu Grmay	(Algeria) Adil Barbari	(Eritrea) Natnael Berhane
2013	(South Africa) Willie Smit	(South Africa) Johannes Christoffel Nel	(Algeria) Adil Barbari
2015	(Eritrea) Merhawi Kudus	(Rwanda) Valens Ndayisenga	(Algeria) Adil Barbari
2016	(Rwanda) Valens Ndayisenga	(Eritrea) Amanuel Gebrezgabihier	(Algeria) Abderrahmane Bechlaghem
2017	(South Africa) Stefan de Bod	(Eritrea) Awet Habtom	(Rwanda) Joseph Areruya
2018	(Rwanda) Joseph Areruya	(Ethiopia) Redwan Ebrahim	(Eritrea) Simon Musie
2019	(Rwanda) Moise Mugisha	(Ethiopia) Redwan Ebrahim	(Algeria) Islam Mansouri
2021	(Algeria) Hamza Mansouri	(Rwanda) Jean Eric Habimana	(Burkina Faso) Paul Daumont
2022	(Rwanda) Renus Uhiriwe	(Egypt) Youssef Ahmed	(Algeria) Salah Eddine Ayoubi Cherki
2023	(Ethiopia) Kiya Rogora	(Eritrea) Aklili Arefayne	(Algeria) Hamza Amari
2024	(Uganda) Paul Lomuria	(Uganda) Lawrence Lorot	(South Africa) Joshua Dike
2025	(South Africa) Joshua Dike	(Eritrea) Mewael Girmay	(Morocco) Driss El Alouani
2026	(Eritrea) Yafiet Mulugeta	(South Africa) Joshua Dike	(South Africa) Ryno Schutte

=== Team Time Trial ===
Year	Gold	Silver	Bronze
2009	South Africa; Reinardt Janse van Rensburg; Ian McLeod; Jay Robert Thomson; Christoff van Heerden	South Africa; Jacques Celliers; Heinrich Koehne; Victor Krohne; Lotto Petrus	South Africa; Mohamed Ali Almabruk Abubregh; Faysal Shaban Alsharaa; Ahmed Youcef Belgasem
2010	Eritrea; Fregalsi Debesay; Meron Russom; Tesfai Teklit; Daniel Teklehaimanot	South Africa; Reinardt Janse van Rensburg; Luthando Kaka; Jason Bakke	Ethiopia; Msgena Kindeya; Sollomon Bittew Shiferaw; Goton Mebrahtu Biru
2011	Eritrea; Natnael Berhane; Fregalsi Debesay; Jani Tewelde; Daniel Teklehaimanot	South Africa; Reinardt Janse van Rensburg; Herman Fouche; Louis Meintjes; Jaco Venter	Morocco; Reda Aadel; Adil Jelloul; Mouhssine Lahsaini; Abdelati Saadoune
2012	Eritrea; Natnael Berhane; Fregalsi Debesay; Daniel Teklehaimanot; Jani Tewelde	Tunisia; Akkouche Said Ali; Rafaâ Chtioui; Maher Hasnaoui; Ahmed M'Raïhi	Algeria; Adil Barbari; Hichem Chaabane; Karim Hadjbouzit; Fayçal Hamza
2013	Eritrea; Natnael Berhane; Meron Russom; Daniel Teklehaimanot; Meron Teshome	Algeria; Adil Barbari; Hichem Chaabane; Azzedine Lagab; Abdelmalek Madani	South Africa; Calvin Beneke; Shaun-Nick Bester; Johannes Christoffel Nel; Ryan Gibbons
2015	Eritrea; Natnael Berhane; Mekseb Debesay; Merhawi Kudus; Daniel Teklehaimanot	South Africa; Nicholas Dlamini; Reinardt Janse van Rensburg; Louis Meintjes; Jay Thomson	Ethiopia; Getachew Atsbha; Temesgen Buru; Kibrom Giday; Tsgabu Grmay
2016	Eritrea; Elias Afewerki; Tesfom Okubamariam; Amanuel Gebrezgabihier; Mekseb Debesay	Algeria; Azzedine Lagab; Abderrahmane Mansouri; Abderrahmane Bechlaghem; Nassim Saidi	Morocco; Lahcen Saber; Mouhssine Lahsaini; Salaheddine Mraouni; Mohamed Er Rafai
2017	Eritrea; Awet Habtom; Meron Abraham; Meron Teshome; Amanuel Gebrezgabihier	Algeria; Abdelkader Belmokhtar; Abderrahmane Mansouri; Azzedine Lagab; Abdallah Benyoucef	Rwanda; Valens Ndayisenga; Joseph Areruya; Jean Bosco Nsengimana; Samuel Mugisha
2018	Eritrea; Amanuel Gebrezgabihier; Metkel Eyob; Mekseb Debesay; Saymon Musie	Rwanda; Adrien Niyonshuti; Joseph Areruya; Valens Ndayisenga; Jean Bosco Nsengimana	Algeria; Youcef Reguigui; Abderrahmane Mansouri; Azzedine Lagab; Islam Mansouri
2019	Eritrea; Meron Teshome; Yakob Debesay; Sirak Tesfom; Mekseb Debesay	Rwanda; Valens Ndayisenga; Moise Mugisha; Jean-Claude Uwizeye; Jean Bosco Nsengimana	Ethiopia; Fiseha Gebremariam; Temesgen Buru; Tesfay Teklehaimanot; Redwan Ebrahim
2021	South Africa; Gustav Basson; Ryan Gibbons; Kent Main; Jason Oosthuizen	Rwanda; Joseph Areruya; Jean Eric Habimana; Moise Mugisha; Jean Bosco Nsengimana	Algeria; Azzedine Lagab; Hamza Mansouri; Youcef Reguigui; Nassim Saidi
2022	Eritrea; Aklilu Gebrehiwet; Mikiel Habtom; Henok Mulubrhan; Dawit Yemane	South Africa; Gustav Basson; Reinardt Janse Van Rensburg; Kent Main; Callum Ormiston	Algeria; Salah Eddine Ayoubi Cherki; Azzedine Lagab; Hamza Mansouri; Islam Mansouri
2023	Algeria; Nassim Saidi; Azzedine Lagab; Hamza Amari; Hamza Mansouri	Eritrea; Nahom Zerai; Henok Mulubrhan; Milkias Kudus; Aklilu Arefayne	Rwanda; Renus Byiza Uhiriwe; Jean Bosco Nsengimana; Etienne Tuyizere; Moise Mugisha

Medallists by nation
Rank	Nation	Gold	Silver	Bronze	Total
1	Eritrea	10	1	0	11
2	South Africa	2	5	2	9
3	Algeria	1	3	4	8
4	Rwanda	0	3	2	5
5	Tunisia	0	1	0	1
6	Ethiopia	0	0	3	3
7	Morocco	0	0	2	2
Totals (7 entries)		13	13	13	39

Updated after the 2024 African Road Championships

== Women ==
=== Road Race ===
Year	Gold	Silver	Bronze
2005	(South Africa) Anke Erlank	(South Africa) Marissa van der Merwe	(South Africa) Chrissie Viljoen
2006	(South Africa) Yolandi du Toit	(South Africa) Ronel Van Wyk	(South Africa) Marissa van der Merwe
2007	(South Africa) Marissa van der Merwe	(South Africa) Lynette Burger	(South Africa) Yolandi du Toit
2008	(South Africa) Cassandra Slingerland	(South Africa) Marissa van der Merwe	(Mauritius) Aurélie Halbwachs
2009	(South Africa) Lynette Burger	(South Africa) Cherise Taylor	(South Africa) Lizanne Naude
2010	(South Africa) Lylanie Lauwrens	(South Africa) Lise Olivier	(Mauritius) Aurélie Halbwachs
2011	(South Africa) Ashleigh Moolman	(South Africa) Cherise Taylor	(Mauritius) Aurélie Halbwachs
2012	(South Africa) Ashleigh Moolman	(South Africa) An-Li Pretorius	(South Africa) Lise Olivier
2013	(South Africa) Ashleigh Moolman	(Namibia) Vera Adrian	(Eritrea) Wehazit Kidane
2015	(South Africa) Ashleigh Moolman	(South Africa) Lise Olivier	(Ethiopia) Hadnet Kidane
2016	(Namibia) Vera Adrian	(South Africa) An-Li Kachelhoffer	(Mauritius) Kimberley Le Court
2017	(Mauritius) Aurelie Halbwachs	(Mauritius) Kimberley Le Court	(South Africa) Charlene Roux
2018	(Eritrea) Bisrat Ghebremeskel	(Ethiopia) Tsega Beyene	(Eritrea) Mossana Debesay
2019	(Eritrea) Mossana Debesay	(Ethiopia) Eyeru Tesfoam Gebru	(South Africa) Joanna van de Winkel
2021	(South Africa) Carla Oberholzer	(South Africa) Hayley Preen	(Namibia) Vera Looser
2022	(Egypt) Ebtissam Mohamed	(Mauritius) Kimberley Le Court	(Burkina Faso) Awa Bamogo
2023	(Nigeria) Ese Ukpeseraye	(Burkina Faso) Awa Bamogo	(Mauritius) Lucie de Marigny-Lagesse
2024	(South Africa) Ashleigh Moolman Pasio	(Eritrea) Adiam Dawit	(Rwanda) Diane Ingabire
2025	(South Africa) Hayley Preen	(Eritrea) Birikti Fessehaye	(Rwanda) Claudette Nyirarukundo
2026	(South Africa) Magda Nieuwoudt	(South Africa) Lisa Bone	(South Africa) Tiffany Keep

Medallists by nation
Rank	Nation	Gold	Silver	Bronze	Total
1	South Africa	14	12	8	34
2	Eritrea	2	2	2	6
3	Mauritius	1	2	5	8
4	Namibia	1	1	1	3
5	Egypt	1	0	0	1
5	Nigeria	1	0	0	1
7	Ethiopia	0	2	1	3
8	Burkina Faso	0	1	1	2
9	Rwanda	0	0	2	2
Totals (9 entries)		20	20	20	60

Updated after the 2025 African Road Championships

=== Time Trial ===
Year	Gold	Silver	Bronze
2005	(South Africa) Anke Erlank	(South Africa) Dianne Emery	(South Africa) Chrissie Viljoen
2006	(Mauritius) Aurélie Halbwachs	(South Africa) Ronel Van Wyk	(Zimbabwe) Linda Davidson
2007	(South Africa) Lynette Burger	(South Africa) Yolandi du Toit	(Mauritius) Aurélie Halbwachs
2008	(South Africa) Cassandra Slingerland	(South Africa) Marissa van der Merwe	(Mauritius) Aurélie Halbwachs
2009	(South Africa) Cassandra Slingerland	(South Africa) Lynette Burger	(Mauritius) Aurélie Halbwachs
2010	(South Africa) Lylanie Lauwrens	(Mauritius) Aurélie Halbwachs	(South Africa) Lizanne Naude
2011	(South Africa) Cherise Taylor	(South Africa) Ashleigh Moolman	(Mauritius) Aurélie Halbwachs
2012	(South Africa) Ashleigh Moolman	(South Africa) An-Li Pretorius	(Namibia) Vera Adrian
2013	(South Africa) Ashleigh Moolman	(Eritrea) Wehazit Kidane	(Namibia) Vera Adrian
2015	(South Africa) Ashleigh Moolman	(South Africa) Heidi Dalton	(Mauritius) Aurélie Halbwachs
2016	(Namibia) Vera Adrian	(Rwanda) Jeanne D'arc Girubuntu	(South Africa) Samantha Sanders
2017	(Mauritius) Aurélie Halbwachs	(Eritrea) Mossana Debesay	(South Africa) Juanita Venter
2018	(Eritrea) Mossana Debesay	(Ethiopia) Selam Amha Gerefiel	(Ethiopia) Eyeru Tesfoam Gebru
2019	(Ethiopia) Selam Amha Gerefiel	(Ethiopia) Eyeru Tesfoam Gebru	(Eritrea) Desiet Kidane
2021	(South Africa) Carla Oberholzer	(South Africa) Frances Janse van Rensburg	(Namibia) Vera Looser
2022	(Algeria) Nesrine Houili	(Egypt) Ebtissam Zayed Ahmed	(South Africa) Kerry Jonker
2023	(Mauritius) Aurélie Halbwachs	(Rwanda) Valentine Nzayisenga	(Mauritius) Kimberley Le Court
2024	(South Africa) Lucy Young	(South Africa) Ashleigh Moolman	(Namibia) Melissa Hinz
2025	(South Africa) Lucy Young	(Mauritius) Aurelie Halbwachs	(Rwanda) Xaveline Nirere
2026	(Rwanda) Diane Ingabire	(Mauritius) Aurelie Halbwachs	(South Africa) Lucy Young

Medallists by nation
Rank	Nation	Gold	Silver	Bronze	Total
1	South Africa	12	10	6	28
2	Mauritius	3	3	6	12
3	Eritrea	1	2	1	4
3	Ethiopia	1	2	1	4
3	Rwanda	1	2	1	4
6	Namibia	1	0	4	5
7	Algeria	1	0	0	1
8	Egypt	0	1	0	1
9	Zimbabwe	0	0	1	1
Totals (9 entries)		20	20	20	60

Updated after the 2026 African Road Championships

=== U23 Time Trial ===
Year	Gold	Silver	Bronze
2024	(Eritrea) Suzana Fiseha	(Eritrea) Adiam Dawit	(Ethiopia) Mieraf Aregawi
2025	(Algeria) Nesrine Houili	(Rwanda) Jazilla Mwamikazi	(Eritrea) Monalisa Araya
2026	(Rwanda) Jazilla Mwamikazi	(South Africa) Marzaan Mellett	(Ethiopia) Kahsay Tsige Kiros

Medallists by nation
Rank	Nation	Gold	Silver	Bronze	Total
1	Eritrea	1	1	1	3
2	Rwanda	1	1	0	2
3	Algeria	1	0	0	1
4	South Africa	0	1	0	1
5	Ethiopia	0	0	2	2
Totals (5 entries)		3	3	3	9

Updated after the 2026 African Road Championships

=== Team Time Trial ===
Year	Gold	Silver	Bronze
2013	Eritrea; Tsehainesh Fitsum; Yorsalem Ghebru; Wehazit Kidane; Senayt Mengsteab	Nigeria; Tombrapa Gripka; Rosemary Marcus; Glory Odiase	Ethiopia; Meseret Hagos; Selam Hagos; Eyerusalem Kelil; Hadnet Kidane
2015	South Africa; Ashleigh Moolman; Heidi Dalton; Lynette Burger; An-Li Pretorius	Namibia; Vera Adrian; Michelle Vorster; Irene Steyn	Eritrea; Tsehainesh Fitsum; Yohana Dawit; Wehazit Kidane; Mossana Debesay
2021	South Africa; Frances Janse van Rensburg; Carla Oberholzer; Hayley Preen	Rwanda; Diane Ingabire; Valantine Nzayisenga; Jacqueline Tuyishimire	Ethiopia; Selam Amha; Taye Watango; Mhiret Gebreyewhans
2022	Eritrea; Monalisa Araya; Adiam Dawit; Milena Fafiet; Danait Fitsum	Mauritius; Lucie de Marigny-Lagesse; Celia Halbwachs; Raphaëlle Lamusse; Kimberley Le Court	Egypt; Nada Aboubalash; Hapepa Eliwa; Rehab Elsherbini; Ebtissam Zayed Ahmed
2023	Mauritius; Lucie de Marigny-Lagesse; Aurélie Halbwachs; Raphaëlle Lamusse; Kimberley Le Court	Namibia; Anri Krugel; Courtney Liebenberg; Vera Looser; Melissa Hinz	Rwanda; Xaverine Nirere; Valantine Nzayisenga; Diane Ingabire

Medallists by nation
Rank	Nation	Gold	Silver	Bronze	Total
1	Eritrea	2	0	1	3
2	South Africa	2	0	0	2
3	Mauritius	1	1	0	2
4	Namibia	0	2	0	2
5	Rwanda	0	1	1	2
6	Nigeria	0	1	0	1
7	Ethiopia	0	0	2	2
8	Egypt	0	0	1	1
Totals (8 entries)		5	5	5	15

Updated after the 2024 African Road Championships

== Mixed team time trial ==
Year	Gold	Silver	Bronze
2021	South Africa; Ryan Gibbons; Kent Main; Gustav Basson; Carla Oberholzer; Frances Janse van Rensburg; Hayley Preen	Rwanda; Jacqueline Tuyishimire; Jean Bosco Nsengimana; Moise Mugisha; Jean Eric Habimana; Diane Ingabire; Valantine Nzayisenga	Ethiopia; Serkalen Taye Watango; Tsgabu Grmay; Sintayehu Kebede; Yared Beharu; Selam Ahama Gerefiel; Miheret Asegele Gebreyewhans
2022	Mauritius; Aurélien de Comarmond; Lucie de Marigny-Lagesse; Raphaelle Lamusse; Kimberley Le Court; Alexandre Mayer; Christopher Rougier-Lagane	Eritrea; Monalisa Araya; Milena Fafiet; Aklilu Gebrehiwet; Mikiel Habtom; Feven Haile; Dawit Yemane	Egypt; Youssef Abouelhassan; Assem Elhosseiny Khalil; Hapepa Eliwa; Rehab Elsherbini; Ahmed Saad; Ebtissam Zayed Ahmed
2023	Mauritius; Aurélie Halbwachs; Raphaëlle Lamusse; Kimberley Le Court; Alexandre Mayer; Gregory Mayer; Christopher Lagane	Rwanda; Etienne Tuyizere; Samuel Niyonkuru; Eric Muhoza; Valantine Nzayisenga; Diane Ingabire; Xaverine Nirere	Burkina Faso; Awa Bamogo; Pascaline Dambinga; Issouf Ilboudo; Vincent Mouni; Bachirou Nikiema; Lamoussa Zoungrana
2024	Rwanda; Moise Mugisha; Vainqueur Masengesho; Etienne Tuyizere; Diane Ingabire; Josiane Mukashema; Valantine Nzayisenga	Eritrea; Natan Medhanie; Hebron Berhane; Milkiyas Maekele; Suzana Fiseha; Milena Yafiet; Adiam Dawit	Ethiopia; Negasi Haylu Abreha; Geremedhin Hailemaryam; Kiya Rogora; Mieraf Aregawi; Merhawit Asgodom; Taye Watango
2025	Mauritius; Aurelie Halbwachs; Jeremy Raboude; Aurelien de Comarmond; Raphaëlle Lamusse; Lucie de Marigny-Lagesse; Alexandre Mayer	Rwanda; Xaveline Nirere; Diane Ingabire; Martha Ntakirutimana; Moise Mugisha; Shemu Nsengiyumva; Etienne Tuyizere	Algeria; Nesrine Houili; Mechab Malik; Imene Maldji; Nassim Saidi; Youcef Reguigui; Hamza Amari
2026	South Africa	Mauritius	Rwanda

Medallists by nation
Rank	Nation	Gold	Silver	Bronze	Total
1	Mauritius	3	1	0	4
2	South Africa	2	0	0	2
3	Rwanda	1	3	1	5
4	Eritrea	0	2	0	2
5	Ethiopia	0	0	2	2
6	Algeria	0	0	1	1
6	Burkina Faso	0	0	1	1
6	Egypt	0	0	1	1
Totals (8 entries)		6	6	6	18

Updated after the 2026 African Road Championships
