= Goitom =

Goitom is a masculine given name with origins in Eritrea. It may refer to:

- Goitom Kifle (born 1993), Eritrean long-distance runner
- Henok Goitom (born 1984), Eritrean football striker
- Merhawi Goitom (born 1996), Eritrean racing cyclist
- Testfaldet Goitom, Eritrean football midfielder
