= Temesgen =

Temesgen is a given name. People with the name include:

== Given name ==
- Temesgen Buru (born 1994), Ethiopian cyclist
- Temesgen Desalegn, Ethiopian journalist
- Temesgen Tiruneh, Deputy Prime Minister of Ethiopia since 2024

== Middle name ==
- Tsiyon Temesgen Abebe (born 2006), Ethiopian middle- and long-distance runner
