= Cycling at the 2023 African Games =

- Venue: Ablekuma-Pokuase Highway
- Location: Accra, Ghana
- Dates: 9–16 March

Cycling at the 2023 African Games was held from 9 to 16 March 2024 in Accra, Ghana.

== Medal summary ==
=== Men ===
Event	Gold	Silver	Bronze
Men's road race	Alexandre Mayer; Mauritius	Dillon Geary; South Africa	Merhawi Kudus; Eritrea
Men's road race U23	Dillon Geary; South Africa	Aurélien de Comarmond; Mauritius	Nahom Zeray Araya; Eritrea
Men's Criterium	Nahom Zeray Araya; Eritrea	Merhawi Kudus; Eritrea	Aurélien de Comarmond; Mauritius
Men's Criterium U23	Nahom Zeray Araya; Eritrea	Aurélien de Comarmond; Mauritius	Blaine Kieck; South Africa
Men's individual time trial	Charles Kagimu; Uganda	Dillon Geary; South Africa	Brandon Downes; South Africa
Men's individual time trial U23	Dillon Geary; South Africa	Kiya Rogora; Ethiopia	Aurélien de Comarmond; Mauritius
Men's team time trial	Eritrea; Merhawi Kudus; Milkias Maekele; Dawit Yemane; Nahom Zerai	South Africa; Brandon Downes; Dillon Geary; Blaine Kieck; Daniyal Matthews	Mauritius; Aurélien de Comarmond; Hanson Matombé; Alexandre Mayer; Christopher Lagane

=== Women ===
Event	Gold	Silver	Bronze
Women's road race	Hayley Preen; South Africa	Aurélie Halbwachs; Mauritius	Ese Lovina Ukpeseraye; Nigeria
Women's road race U23	Nesrine Houili; Algeria	Adiam Dawit; Eritrea	Monalisa Araya; Eritrea
Women's Criterium	Hayley Preen; South Africa	Anri Krugel; Namibia	Diane Ingabire; Rwanda
Women's Criterium U23	Adiam Dawit Mengs; Eritrea	Anika Visser; South Africa	Ksanet Weldemikeal Teages; Eritrea
Women's individual time trial	Aurelie Halbwachs; Mauritius	Ese Ukpeseraye; Nigeria	Lucy Young; South Africa
Women's individual time trial U23	Adiam Dawit Mengs; Eritrea	Nesrine Houili; Algeria	Suzana Fiseha Chineslasie; Eritrea
Women's team time trial	Eritrea; Monalisa Araya; Birikti Fessehaye; Suzana Fisehaye; Adiam Dawit	South Africa; Sonica Klopper; Hayley Preen; Anika Visser; Lucy Young	Mauritius; Lucie de Marigny-Lagesse; Aurélie Halbwachs; Raphaëlle Lamusse

=== Mixed ===
Event	Gold	Silver	Bronze
Mixed Relay	Mauritius; Alexandre Mayer; Christopher Lagane; Aurélien de Comarmond; Lucie de Marigny-Lagesse; Aurélie Halbwachs; Raphaëlle Lamusse	South Africa; Blaine Kieck; Brandon Downes; Dillon Geary; Anika Visser; Lucy Young; Sonica Klopper	Eritrea; Dawit Yemane; Merhawi Kudus; Nahom Zerai; Adiam Dawit; Suzana Fisehaye; Birikti Fessehaye

== Medal table ==
Rank	Nation	Gold	Silver	Bronze	Total
1	Eritrea (ERI)	6	2	6	14
2	South Africa (RSA)	4	6	3	13
3	Mauritius (MRI)	3	3	4	10
4	Algeria (ALG)	1	1	0	2
5	Uganda (UGA)	1	0	0	1
6	Nigeria (NGR)	0	1	1	2
7	Ethiopia (ETH)	0	1	0	1
7	Namibia (NAM)	0	1	0	1
9	Rwanda (RWA)	0	0	1	1
Totals (9 entries)		15	15	15	45
