= Johann Rabie =

South African cyclist

Personal information
- Born: 8 March 1987 (age 39) Montagu, Western Cape, South Africa

Cycling career
- Sport: Cycling
- Discipline: Road
- Role: Rider

Amateur team
- 2007: Team Neotel

Professional teams
- 2006: Team Konica Minolta
- 2008–2009: Team Neotel
- 2011–2012: Team Bonitas

Johann Rabie (born 8 March 1987) is a South African former road cyclist.

== Major results ==
2005
1st Circuit de la Région Wallonne
8th Overall Tour de Lorraine
8th Overall Driedaagse van Axel
2007
2nd Road race, African Cycling Championships
2008
1st Young rider classification Tour de Beauce
National Under-23 Road Championships

2nd Road race
2nd Time trial

6th Pick n Pay Amashovashova National Classic
2009
2nd Giro del Capo I
3rd Giro del Capo II
National Under-23 Road Championships

3rd Road race
3rd Time trial

6th Overall Tour de Kumano
2010
1st Dome 2 Dome Roadrace
1st Stage 2 Jelajah Malaysia
9th Tour de Delhi
2011
2nd Overall Tour of South Africa
3rd Overall Tour du Maroc

1st Stage 1

9th Tour de Mumbai I
2012
National Road Championships

3rd Road race
3rd Time trial

2013
National Road Championships

2nd Road race
3rd Time trial
