= Cycling at the 2007 All-Africa Games =

Cycling was part of the 2007 All-Africa Games competition schedule.

== Results ==
=== Men's 150 km Road Race ===
| Rank | Cyclist | Nationality | Time |
|---|---|---|---|
| 1. | Daryl Impey | South Africa | 3h48:51 |
| 2. | Ferekalsi Debesay | Eritrea | s.t. |
| 3. | Chris Froome | Kenya | s.t. |
| 4. | Gebrihiwot Merhawi | Eritrea | s.t. |
| 5. | Thomas Desvaux | Mauritius | s.t. |
| 6. | Yannick Lincoln | Mauritius | s.t. |
| 7. | Hanco Kachelhoffer | South Africa | s.t. |
| 8. | Tekli Hamanlot Daniel | Eritrea | + 1:24 |
| 9. | Mayle Dawit | Eritrea | + 1:25 |
| 10. | Sadrack Teguimaha | Cameroon | + 1:26 |

=== Women's 80 km Road Race ===
| Rank | Cyclist | Nationality | Time |
|---|---|---|---|
| 1. | Yolandi du Toit | South Africa | 1h59:45 |
| 2. | Marissa van der Merwe | South Africa | + 1:09 |
| 3. | Lynette Burger | South Africa | + 1:12 |
| 4. | Rhoda Ezikiel Zaze | Nigeria | + 1:17 |
| 5. | Aurelie Halbwachs | Mauritius | + 1:21 |
| 6. | Ego Uzoho | Nigeria | + 11:15 |
| 7. | Marwa Ali Ramdane | Egypt | s.t. |
| 8. | Sarah Samuel | Nigeria | + 11:18 |
| 9. | Yousra Mohamed | Egypt | + 11:53 |
| 10. | Houda Belmadani | Algeria | + 12:19 |

== Medal table ==
| Rank | Nation | Gold | Silver | Bronze | Total |
|---|---|---|---|---|---|
| 1 | South Africa (RSA) | 2 | 1 | 1 | 4 |
| 2 | Eritrea (ERI) | 0 | 1 | 0 | 1 |
| 3 | Kenya (KEN) | 0 | 0 | 1 | 1 |
| Totals (3 entries) | | 2 | 2 | 2 | 6 |
