= Tour de Maurice =

Race details
- Date: June
- Region: Mauritius
- English name: Tour of Mauritius
- Discipline: Road
- Competition: UCI Africa Tour
- Type: Stage race
- Organiser: Mauritian Cycling Federation

History
- First edition: 1980
- Editions: 42 (as of 2026)
- First winner: Franck Grondin (FRA)
- Most wins: Yannick Lincoln (MRI) (6 wins)
- Most recent: Anatolii Budiak (UKR)

The Tour de Maurice is a multi-day road cycling race annually held in Mauritius. Since 2023 it has been held as a 2.2 category event on the UCI Africa Tour.

Chris Froome notably won the 2006 edition of the race, while still riding under Kenyan nationality.

== Winners ==
Year	Winner	Second	Third
1980	(France) Franck Grondin		
1981	(Switzerland) José Flury		
1982	(Switzerland) Laurent Decrausaz		
1983	(Madagascar) Jean-Claude Rakotamanana		
1984	(France) Luçay Damour		
1985	No race		
1986	(France) Jean-François Pothin		
1987	(Mauritius) Éric Pitchen		
1988	(France) Richard Baret		
1989	(France) Yannick Foirest		
1990	(France) Jannick Germain		
1991	(France) Jean-Pierre Bourgeot		
1992	(France) Jean-Pierre Bourgeot		
1993	(France) Richard Baret		
1994	(France) Jean-Philippe Rubens		
1995	(France) Vincent Moreels	(Mauritius) Patrick Haberland	
1996	(Mauritius) Patrick Haberland		
1997	(France) Richard Baret	(Zimbabwe) David Dickinson	
1998	(Mauritius) Patrick Haberland		
1999	(France) Jean-Pierre Bourgeot		
2000	(South Africa) Rudolf Wentzel		
2001	(United States) Sean Van Court		
2002	(France) Richard Baret	(France) Jean-Marie Lebeau	(South Africa) Sean Merridew
2003	No race		
2004	(France) Stéphane Lucilly	(South Africa) Sean Merridew	(France) Samuel Bénard
2005	(Mauritius) Yannick Lincoln	(Mauritius) Christophe Lincoln	(France) Richard Baret
2006	(Kenya) Chris Froome	(South Africa) Alex Pavlov	(Mauritius) Yannick Lincoln
2007	(Mauritius) Yannick Lincoln	(France) Frédéric Géminiani	(France) Jean-Denis Armand
2008	(France) Mickaël Malle	(South Africa) Jaco Ferreira	(Mauritius) Yannick Lincoln
2009	(France) Sylvain Georges	(Mauritius) Yannick Lincoln	(South Africa) Andrew MacLean
2010	(South Africa) Andrew MacLean	(Mauritius) Yannick Lincoln	(South Africa) Gabriel Combrinck
2011	(Mauritius) Yannick Lincoln	(France) Emmanuel Chamand	(France) Richard Baret
2012	(Mauritius) Yannick Lincoln	(France) Christophe Boyer	(South Africa) Willie Smit
2013	(Mauritius) Yannick Lincoln	(South Africa) Alan Gordon	(South Africa) Adolph Krige
2014	(Mauritius) Yannick Lincoln	(South Africa) James Tennent	(South Africa) Ian Pienaar
2015	(South Africa) Willie Smit	(France) Sylvain Georges	(South Africa) James Tennent
2016	(South Africa) James Tennent	(Mauritius) Christopher Lagane	(United Arab Emirates) Yousif Mirza
2017	(Mauritius) Olivier Le Court de Billot	(Mauritius) Yannick Lincoln	(France) Guillaume Gaboriaud
2018	(South Africa) Gustav Basson	(Mauritius) Christopher Lagane	(South Africa) Gregory de Vink
2019	(Mauritius) Grégory Lagane	(Mauritius) Alexandre Mayer	(Mauritius) Christopher Lagane
2020	(Mauritius) Alexandre Mayer	(Mauritius) Dylan Redy	(Mauritius) Yannick Lincoln
2021	(Mauritius) Christopher Lagane	(France) Étienne Tortelier	(Mauritius) Alexandre Mayer
2022	(Mauritius) Christopher Lagane	(France) Maxime Jolly	(Mauritius) Alexandre Mayer
2023	(United Kingdom) Archie Cross	(Mauritius) Christopher Lagane	(Germany) Pirmin Eisenbarth
2024	(Poland) Piotr Brożyna	(Mauritius) Alexandre Mayer	(Cyprus) Andreas Miltiadis
2025	No race		
2026	(Ukraine) Anatolii Budiak	(France) Antoine Huby	(Rwanda) Samuel Niyonkuru
