= Byron Munton =

South African bicycle racer

Personal information
- Born: 12 December 1998 (age 27) Hout Bay, South Africa
- Height: 1.78 m (5 ft 10 in)
- Weight: 60 kg (132 lb)

Cycling career
- Sport: Cycling
- Current team: Modern Adventure Pro Cycling
- Discipline: Road
- Role: Rider

Amateur teams
- 2016–2017: LeaDout–Ascendis
- 2017: Verandas Willems–Crabbé–CC Chevigny
- 2018: Team Martigues SC–Drag Bicycles
- 2019: AlfaBodyWorks–Giant
- 2019–2020: GSport–Alma Wagen

Professional teams
- 2021: Electro Hiper Europa
- 2022: Dauner–Akkon
- 2023–2024: Epronex–Hungary Cycling Team
- 2025: Feirense–Beeceler
- 2026–: Modern Adventure Pro Cycling

Major wins
- One-day races and Classics National Time Trial Championships (2022)

Byron Munton (born 12 December 1998) is a South African cyclist, who currently rides for UCI ProTeam Modern Adventure Pro Cycling.

A strong time trialist, Munton is a three-time national champion in the event, winning the under-23 category in 2019 and 2020 and the elite in 2022. He also finished eighth in the under-23 time trial at the 2019 UCI Road World Championships. In 2021, Munton underwent emergency surgery due to appendicitis.

In 2025, he won the fourth stage and finished third overall in the Volta a Portugal.

== Major results ==
2019
1st Time trial, National Under-23 Road Championships
4th Overall Tour of Good Hope
8th Time trial, UCI Under-23 Road World Championships
2020
1st Time trial, National Under-23 Road Championships
1st Time trial, Catalan Road Championships
Western Cape Championships

1st Time trial
2nd Road race

1st Herald Cycle Tour
2022 (1 pro win)
1st Time trial, National Road Championships
2nd Overall Tour du Cap
8th Overall Oberösterreich Rundfahrt
2023
4th Time trial, National Road Championships
7th Memorial Henryka Łasaka
8th Memoriał Jana Magiery
2024
2nd GP Slovakia
6th Overall Grand Prix Cycliste de Gemenc
7th Overall Tour of Bulgaria
2025 (1)
3rd Overall Volta a Portugal

1st Stage 4

9th Overall Troféu Joaquim Agostinho
2026
2nd Overall Sibiu Cycling Tour
4th Classic Grand Besançon Doubs
