= Alexandre Mayer =

Mauritian cyclist (born 1998)

Personal information
- Full name: Henry Alexandre Mayer
- Born: 29 April 1998 (age 28) Curepipe, Mauritius
- Height: 1.78 m (5 ft 10 in)
- Weight: 64 kg (141 lb)

Cycling career
- Sport: Cycling
- Current team: Burgos Burpellet BH
- Disciplines: Road; Mountain biking
- Role: Rider

Amateur teams
- 2017: Girondins de Bordeaux
- 2018: Team MCB
- 2018–2020: Team Fybolia-Locminé Auto
- 2021–2022: Black River SC
- 2023: Moka Rangers SC
- 2024: Uskis Saint Piran Development Team
- 2025: Foran CCC

Professional teams
- 2024: Saint Piran
- 2025–: Burgos Burpellet BH

Henry Alexandre Mayer (born 29 April 1998) is a Mauritian cyclist, who rides for UCI ProTeam Burgos Burpellet BH. He has won the Mauritian national road race championships three times in addition to the road race at the 2023 African Games.

== Major results ==
=== Road ===
2015
2nd Time trial, National Junior Championships
2016
8th Time trial, African Junior Championships
2017
3rd Road race, National Championships
2018
1st Prologue (TTT) & Stage 1 Tour Cycliste Antenne Réunion
8th Overall Tour de Limpopo
2019
Indian Ocean Island Games

1st Road race
1st Team time trial

2nd Overall Tour de Maurice

1st Prologue (TTT)

3rd Time trial, National Championships
2020
1st Road race, National Championships
1st Overall Tour de Maurice

1st Stages 3 & 4

2021
National Championships

1st Road race
3rd Time trial

1st Circuit de Champs de Mars
3rd Overall Tour de Maurice
2022
National Championships

1st Road race
2nd Time trial

African Championships

1st Mixed relay TTT
7th Time trial

1st Circuit de Champs de Mars
1st Prologue (TTT) Tour Cycliste Antenne Réunion
3rd Overall Tour de Maurice
2023
African Championships

1st Mixed relay TTT
5th Time trial

Indian Ocean Island Games

1st Team time trial
2nd Road race
2nd Time trial

National Championships

2nd Time trial
3rd Road race

7th Classique de l'île Maurice
2024
African Games

1st Road race
1st Mixed relay
3rd Team time trial
9th Criterium

Indian Ocean Island Championships

1st Road race
1st Time trial
1st Team time trial

National Championships

2nd Road race
3rd Time trial

2nd Overall Tour de Maurice

1st Points classification

African Championships

4th Time trial
9th Road race

6th Classique de l'ìle Maurice
2025
National Championships

1st Time trial
2nd Road race

1st Overall Grand Prix Chantal Biya

1st Points classification
1st Stages 1, 4 & 5

3rd Lincoln Grand Prix
9th Grand Prix Sakiat Sidi Youcef

=== Mountain bike ===
2015
1st Cross-country, National Junior Championships
2019
1st Cross-country, National Championships
2020
1st Cross-country, National Championships
2021
1st Cross-country, National Championships
2022
National Championships

1st Cross-country
1st Cross-country Marathon

2023
1st Cross-country Marathon, National Championships
