= Milkias Maekele =

Eritrean cyclist (born 2005)

Personal information
- Born: 4 September 2005 (age 21) Asmara, Eritrea

Cycling career
- Sport: Cycling
- Current team: Bike Aid
- Discipline: Road
- Role: Rider
- Rider type: Sprinter

Amateur team
- 2023–2025: As.Be.Co Cycling Club

Professional team
- 2025–: Bike Aid

Major wins
- One-day races and Classics National Road Race Championships (2026)

Milkias Maekele (born 4 September 2005) is an Eritrean cyclist, who currently rides for UCI Continental team Bike Aid.

== Major results ==
2024
African Games

1st Team time trial
5th Criterium

1st Grand Prix de la Ville d'Annaba
1st Stage 5 Tour d'Algérie
African Road Championships

2nd Team relay
6th Road race

4th Grand Prix de la Ville d'Oran
2025 (1 pro win)
1st Grand Prix Sakiat Sidi Youcef
1st Stage 6 Tour d'Algérie
1st Stage 4 Tour of Route Salvation
2nd Overall Tour of Azerbaijan

1st Young rider classification
1st Sprints classification
1st Stage 1

5th Grand Prix de la Ville d'Alger
2026 (1)
1st Road race, National Road Championships
