= Aurelie Halbwachs =

Mauritian cyclist (born 1986)

Aurélie Halbwachs
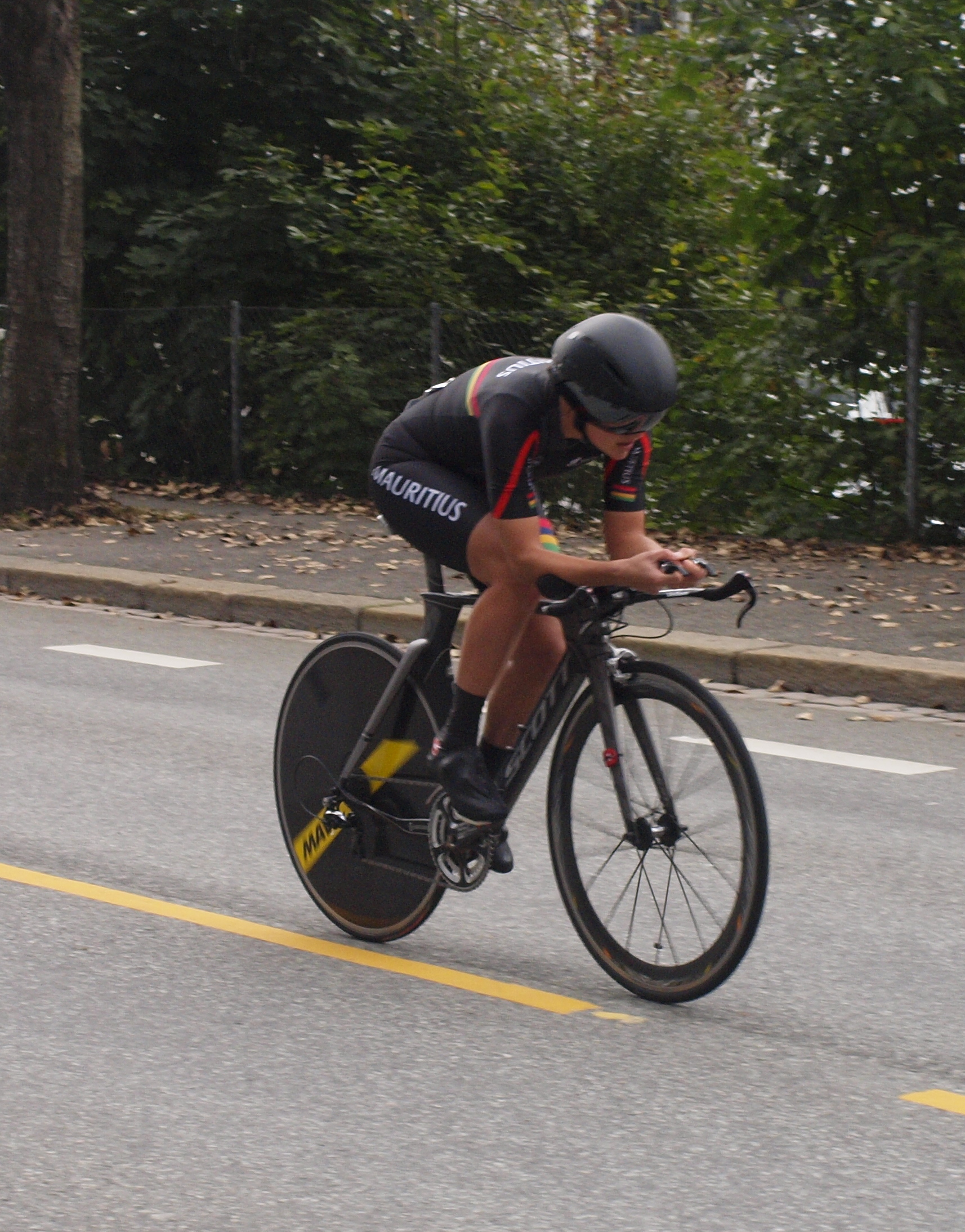
- Halbwachs in 2017.

Personal information
- Full name: Aurélie Marie Halbwachs
- Born: 24 August 1986 (age 40) Curepipe, Mauritius
- Height: 167 cm (5 ft 6 in)
- Weight: 60 kg (132 lb)

Cycling career
- Sport: Cycling
- Discipline: Road
- Role: Rider

Amateur teams
- 2007: Montauban Cycling Féminin 82
- 2017–2018: Île Maurice

Professional team
- 2012: Vienne Futuroscope
Medal record
Representing Mauritius
Women's road cycling
All-Africa Games
Silver medal – second place	2011 Maputo	Time trial
Bronze medal – third place	2011 Maputo	Road race
African Road Championships
Gold medal – first place	2006 Port Louis	Time trial
Gold medal – first place	2017 Luxor	Time trial
Gold medal – first place	2017 Luxor	Road race
Silver medal – second place	2010 Kigali	Time trial
Bronze medal – third place	2008 Casablanca	Time trial
Bronze medal – third place	2008 Casablanca	Road race
Bronze medal – third place	2009 Windhoek	Time trial
Bronze medal – third place	2010 Kigali	Road race
Bronze medal – third place	2011 Asmara	Time trial
Bronze medal – third place	2011 Asmara	Road race
Bronze medal – third place	2015 Wartburg	Time trial
Women's mountain bike racing
CAC Mountain Bike African Championships
Silver medal – second place	2013 Pietermaritzburg	Cross country
Bronze medal – third place	2012 Casela	Cross country

Aurélie Marie Halbwachs (born 24 August 1986) is a Mauritian road bicycle racer. She is a four-time winner of Mauritius' Athlete of the Year, winning in 2006, 2008, 2010 and 2011.

Halbwachs started her career in cycling in 2006 and competed in various local and international tournaments. She competed at the 2008 Summer Olympics, finishing in 68th place, and the 2012 Summer Olympics in the Women's road race, where she failed to finish. Halbwachs was the winner of the time trial at the 2006 African Road Championships, and she won the gold medal in both the road race and the time trial at the 2017 championships. She has also won six individual national road cycling titles – three in the road race, three in the time trial.

During 2016, she started participating in mountain bike races which typically were of 1,200 m climbs and 57 km (35 mi) long.

== Personal life ==
Halbwachs was born on 24 August 1986 in Curepipe, Mauritius. She is married to Yannick Lincoln who is a six time Tour Mauritius champion. She paired with him from 2003 in several mixed doubles squads and cycle championships. They got married in 2006. She gave birth to a daughter, Lana, on 13 September 2015. She volunteered in the initiative of the Ministry of Sports in Mauritius to build a velodrome constructed to enable the infrastructure facilities in Roches Brunes. She has partial association with South African Airways, who have enabled her to participate in mountain bike events.

== Major results ==
2006
African Road Championships

1st Time trial
4th Road race

2007
3rd Time trial, African Road Championships
5th Road race, All-Africa Games
2008
African Road Championships

3rd Time trial
3rd Road race

2009
African Road Championships

3rd Time trial
4th Road race

2010
African Road Championships

2nd Time trial
3rd Road race

2011
National Road Championships

1st Time trial
1st Road race

All-Africa Games

2nd Time trial
3rd Road race

African Road Championships

3rd Time trial
3rd Road race

2012
National Road Championships

1st Time trial
1st Road race

2015
3rd Time trial, African Road Championships
2016
2nd Road race, National Road Championships
African Road Championships

6th Time trial
7th Road race

2017
African Road Championships

1st Time trial
1st Road race

2018
5th Time trial, African Road Championships
2019
African Games

2nd Cross-country
2nd Cross-country marathon
2nd Road race
6th Time trial

African Road Championships

4th Road race
8th Time trial

2020
National Road Championships

1st Time trial
1st Road race

2022
National Road Championships

1st Road Race

2023
African Road Championships

1st Team Time trial
1st Time trial

=== Major championship results timeline ===
Event		2006	2007	2008	2009	2010	2011	2012	2013	2014	2015	2016	2017	2018	2019	2020
Olympic Games	Road race	NH		62	Not held			DNF	Not held			—	Not held			
World Championships	Time trial	—	46	—	—	—	—	—	—	—	—	—	45	—	—	—
World Championships	Road race	—	DNF	—	—	—	—	—	—	—	—	—	DNF	—	—	—
Commonwealth Games	Time trial	—	Not held			14	Not held			19	Not held			12	Not held	
Commonwealth Games	Road race	—	Not held			30	Not held			DNF	Not held			33	Not held	
African Games	Time trial	NH	—	Not held			2	Not held			—	Not held			6	NH
African Games	Road race	NH	5	Not held			3	Not held			—	Not held			2	NH
African Games	Cross-country	NH	—	Not held			—	Not held			—	Not held			2	NH
African Games	Cross-country marathon	NH	—	Not held			—	Not held			—	Not held			2	NH
African Championships	Time trial	1	3	3	3	2	3	—	—	—	3	6	1	5	8	—
African Championships	Road race	4	—	3	4	3	3	—	—	—	11	7	1	DNF	4	—
National Championships	Time trial	—	—	—	—	—	1	1	—	—	—	—	—	—	—	1
National Championships	Road race	—	—	—	—	—	1	1	—	—	—	2	—	—	—	1

Legend
—	Did not compete
DNF	Did not finish
NH	Not held

Olympic Games
Preceded by Richarno Colin; Roilya Ranaivosoa	Flag bearer for Mauritius; Paris 2024 with Jean Gaël Laurent L'Entete	Succeeded by Incumbent
