= Team Neotel =

Team information
- UCI code: NEO
- Registered: South Africa
- Founded: 2007
- Disbanded: 2009
- Discipline: Road
- Status: UCI Continental
- Bicycles: Silverback

Key personnel
- General manager: Eugene Ruiters
- Team managers: Barry Austin; Conrad Lesch; Ronny Lauke

Team name history
- 2007–2008 2009: Team Neotel; Team Neotel–Stegcomputer

Team Neotel was a South African UCI Continental cycling team that existed from 2007 until 2009.

== Major wins ==
2008
Powerade Dome 2 Dome Cycling Spectacular, Nolan Hoffman
Stage 9 Tour de Korea, Nolan Hoffman
National Time Trial Championships, James Lewis Perry
2009
Overall Tour de Korea, Roger Beuchat
Stage 1, Nolan Hoffman
Tour du Jura, Roger Beuchat
