= Yolandi Du Toit =

South African road cyclist

Personal information
- Full name: Yolandi Du Toit
- Born: 3 June 1985 (age 41) South Africa

Cycling career
- Sport: Cycling
- Current team: Team Garmin MTB
- Disciplines: Road; Mountain biking
- Role: Rider

Amateur teams
- 2010–2011: Team Bizhub
- 2014–: Team Garmin MTB

Professional teams
- 2006: Team FBUK
- 2007–2008: Lotto–Belisol Ladiesteam
- 2012: Team Bizhub–FCF

Yolandi Du Toit (born 3 June 1985) is a South African mountain biking and road cyclist, who represented her nation at the 2006, 2007 and 2008 UCI Road World Championships.

== Major results ==
2006
African Road Championships

1st Road race
5th Time trial

2007
1st Road race, All-Africa Games
African Road Championships

2nd Time trial
3rd Road race
