= 2009 Tour of Eritrea =

Race details
- Dates: 16–20 December
- Stages: 5
- Distance: 717 km (445.5 mi)
- Winning time: 18h 55' 47"

Results
Jersey awarded to the overall winner	Winner	Bereket Yemane Abebe (ERI)	(ERI)
	Second	Daniel Teklehaimanot (ERI)	(ERI)
	Third	Meleake Kahsay (ERI)	(ERI)

The 2009 Tour of Eritrea was the 10th edition of the Tour of Eritrea. It started on 16 December ended on December 20. This latest Tour of Eritrea 2009 edition invited 6 national teams in recognition of its acceptance by International Cycling Union (UCI) as one Africa’s internationally recognized tours.

Stage 1 - Keren-Mendefera - 148 km

Stage 2 - Mendefera-Dekmhare - 156 km

Stage 3 - Dekmhare-Massawa - 151 km

Stage 4 - Massawa-Asmara - 112 km

Stage 5 - Asmara criterium - 140 km
