= Ferekalsi Debesay =

Eritrean cyclist

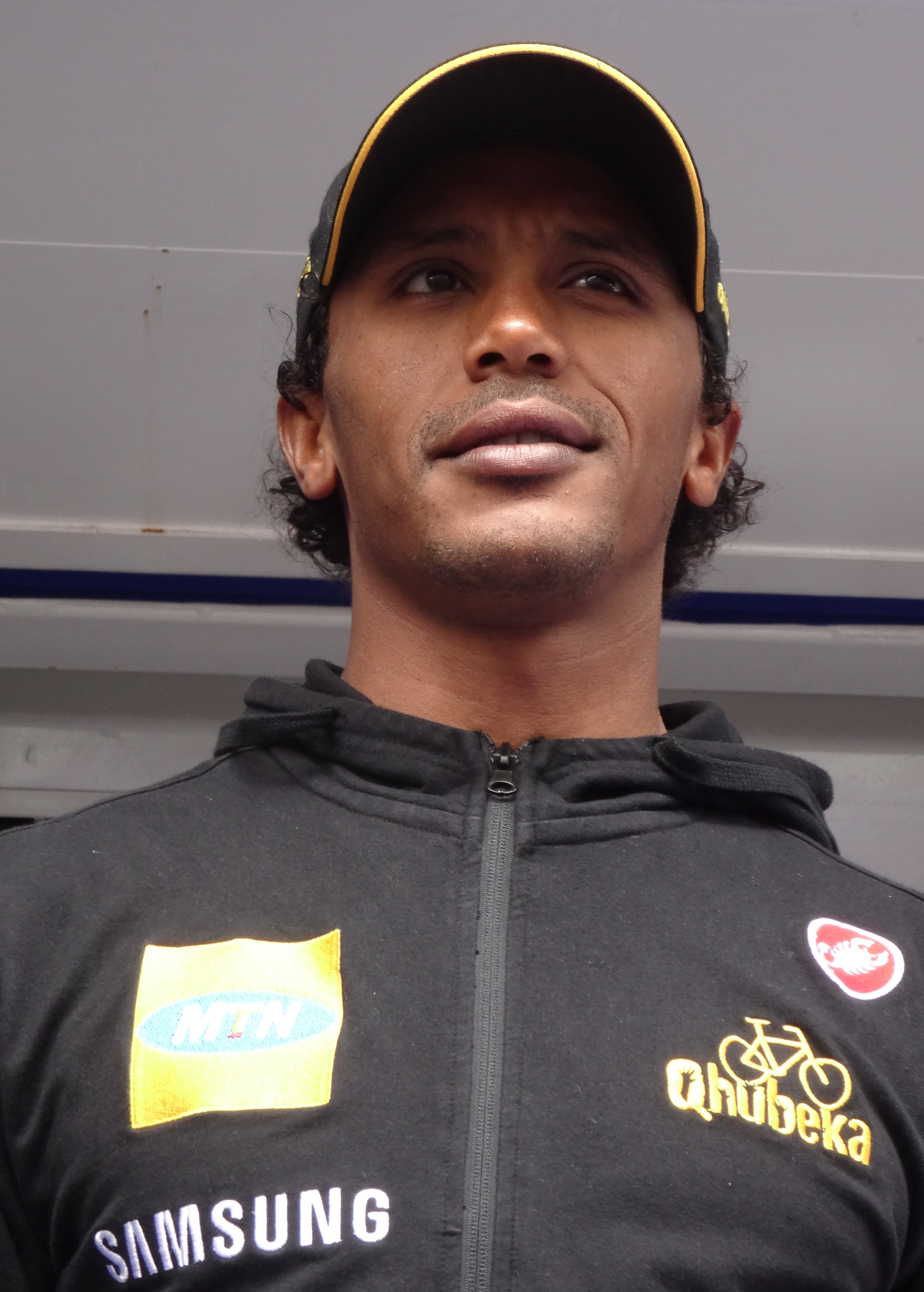

Personal information
- Full name: Ferekalsi Debesay Abrha
- Born: 10 June 1986 (age 40) Tsazega, Eritrea

Cycling career
- Sport: Cycling
- Current team: Retired
- Discipline: Road
- Role: Rider
- Rider type: Time trialist

Professional team
- 2012–2014: MTN–Qhubeka

Ferekalsi Debesay Abrha (born 10 June 1986 in Tsazega) is an Eritrean former professional road cyclist. He is the brother of fellow racing cyclists Mossana Debesai, Mekseb Debesay, Yakob Debesay and Kindishih Debesay.

== Major results ==
2007
2nd Road race, All-Africa Games
8th Road race, African Road Championships
2009
1st Prologue & Stage 4 Tour d'Egypt
9th Overall Tour Eritrea
2010
1st Team time trial, African Road Championships
4th Overall Tour Eritrea
4th Grand Prix of Al Fatah
10th Overall Tour of Rwanda

1st Stages 5 & 9

2011 (1 pro win)
1st Team time trial, African Road Championships
National Road Championships

1st Road race
2nd Time trial

2nd Overall Kwita Izina Cycling Tour
9th Overall Tour d'Algérie
2012
African Road Championships

1st Team time trial
3rd Road race

2nd Overall Tour of Eritrea
4th Road race, National Road Championships
6th Overall La Tropicale Amissa Bongo
2014 (1)
1st Stage 4 La Tropicale Amissa Bongo
