= Johann van Zyl =

South African cyclist

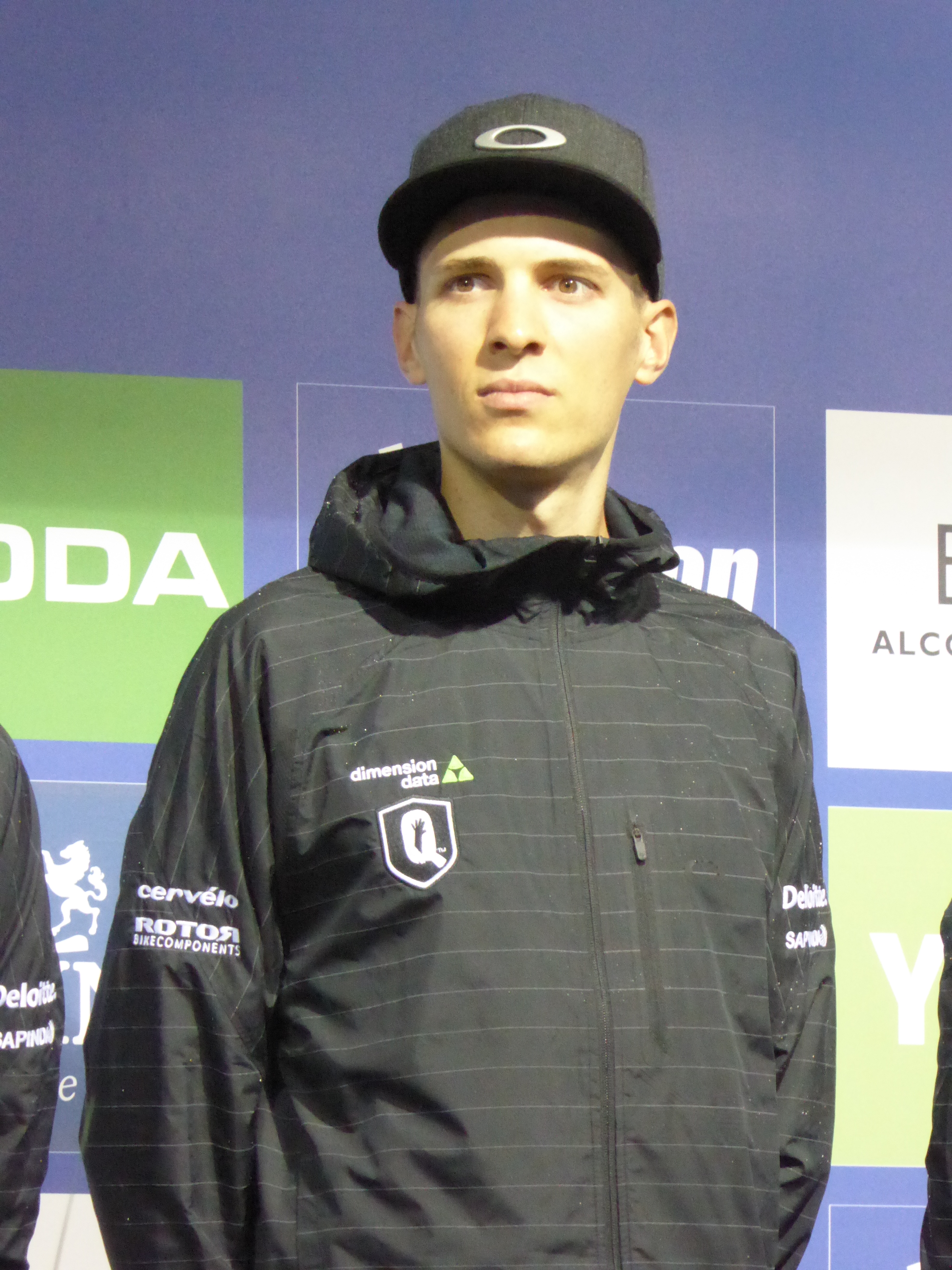
- Van Zyl in 2016

Personal information
- Full name: Johann van Zyl
- Born: 2 February 1991 (age 35) Cape Town, South Africa
- Height: 190 cm (6 ft 3 in)
- Weight: 72 kg (159 lb)

Cycling career
- Sport: Cycling
- Current team: Retired
- Discipline: Road
- Role: Rider

Amateur team
- 2011–2012: Caja Rural

Professional teams
- 2013–2018: MTN–Qhubeka
- 2019: 303Project
- 2020: Team Skyline

Johann van Zyl (born 2 February 1991) is a South African former racing cyclist, who rode professionally between 2013 and 2020 for Team Dimension Data, 303Project and Team Skyline. He rode at the 2013 UCI Road World Championships, and was named in the start list for the 2015 Vuelta a España and the 2016 Giro d'Italia.

After retiring from professional cycling, van Zyl became a coach with Catalyst Coaching, and has since started his own coaching company, Johann van Zyl Coaching.

== Major results ==
2008
1st Road race, National Junior Road Championships
2009
1st Time trial, National Junior Road Championships
1st Stage 1 Vuelta al Besaya
2010
1st Road race, National Under-23 Road Championships
2011
National Road Championships

4th Road race
6th Time trial

8th Chrono des Nations U23
2013
1st Stage 4 Tour of Rwanda
1st Stage 5 (TTT) Tour de Korea
6th Chrono des Nations U23
2015
1st Stage 5 Tour of Austria
2016
6th Time trial, National Road Championships

=== Grand Tour general classification results timeline ===
Grand Tour	2015	2016	2017	2018
Giro d'Italia	—	DNF	149	—
Tour de France	—	—	—	—
Vuelta a España	128	—	—	122

Legend
—	Did not compete
DNF	Did not finish
