= James Lewis Perry =

South African cyclist

James Perry
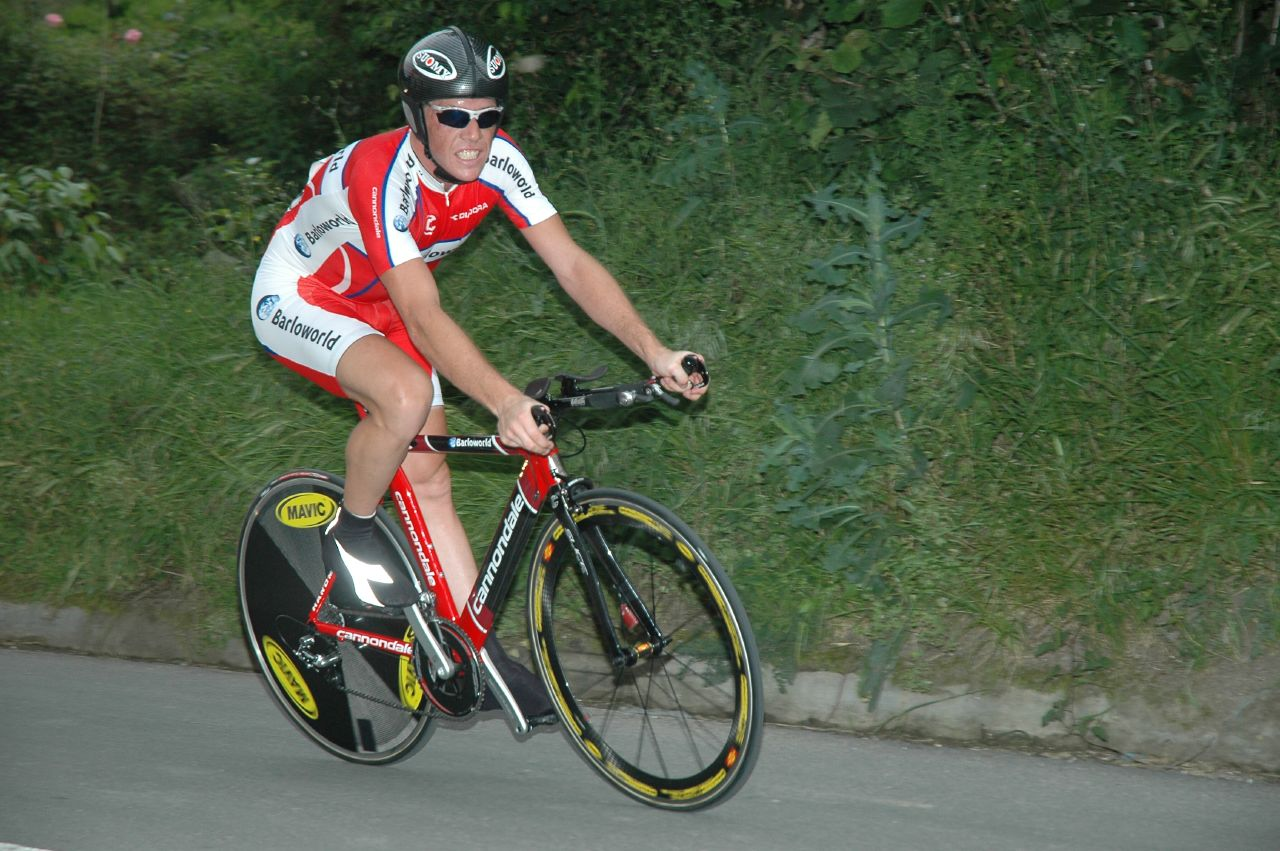

Personal information
- Full name: James Lewis Perry
- Born: 19 November 1979 (age 46) Cape Town, South Africa

Cycling career
- Sport: Cycling
- Current team: Retired
- Disciplines: Road; Track
- Role: Rider

Amateur teams
- 1999–2001: Team IBM-Lotus Development
- 2013–?: Tasol GT

Professional teams
- 2002–2003: Amore & Vita–Beretta
- 2003–2004: Barloworld
- 2005: Team Konica Minolta
- 2006–2007: Barloworld
- 2008–2009: Team Neotel

James Lewis Perry (born 19 November 1979 in Cape Town) is a South African former professional road cyclist. Perry has previously ridden for the UCI Professional Continental team Barloworld until the team's demise. In 2001 he won a bronze medal at the World Under 23 Time Trial Championship. He has been a professional since 2002. He won the Time Trial at the South African Championships in 2002, and also came second in 2007.

He also won the Grand Prix Möbel Alvisse in 2005, while riding for the Konica Minolta team.

== Major results ==
2000
1st Criterium, National Road Championships
2nd Road race, National Under–23 Road Championships
2001
3rd Time trial, Under–23 World Road Championships
2002
1st Time trial, National Road Championships
2005
1st GP Möbel Alvisse
2nd Overall Ringerike GP
2nd Powerade Dome 2 Dome Cycling Spectacular
2nd Flèche Ardennaise
4th Overall Flèche du Sud
5th Road race, National Road Championships
7th Overall Tour of Japan
2007
2nd Time trial, National Road Championships
2008
1st Time trial, National Road Championships
2009
3rd Time trial, National Road Championships
2010
National Road Championships

2nd Time trial
3rd Road race

2011
National Track Championships

1st Individual pursuit
1st Team pursuit

2012
1st Individual pursuit, National Track Championships
2013
1st Team pursuit, National Track Championships
10th Overall Mzansi Tour
2014
5th Time trial, National Road Championships
