= Meron Russom =

Eritrean cyclist (born 1987)

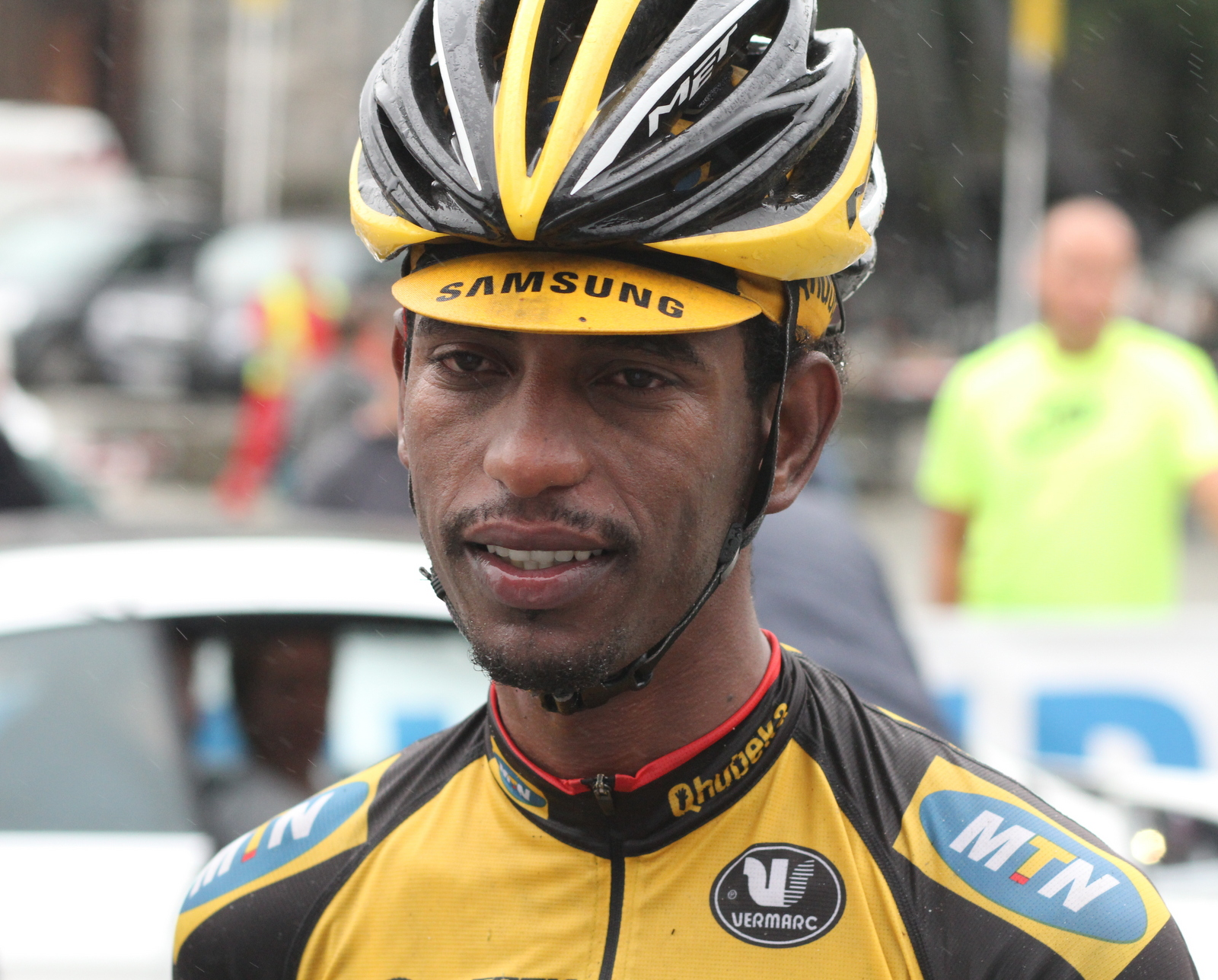

Personal information
- Born: 12 March 1987 (age 39) Asmara, Ethiopia

Cycling career
- Sport: Cycling
- Discipline: Road
- Role: Rider

Professional team
- 2012-2014: MTN–Qhubeka

Meron Russom (born 12 March 1987 in Asmara) is an Eritrean cyclist who last rode for MTN–Qhubeka.

== Palmares ==
2010
African Team Time Trial Champion (with Ferekalsi Debesay, Daniel Teklehaimanot and Tesfai Teklit)
2nd African Road Race Championships
2nd Tour of Libya
2011
1st Tour of Eritrea

1st stage 2

2012
2nd La Tropicale Amissa Bongo
2nd National Time Trial Championships
2013
African Team Time Trial Champion (with Natnael Berhane, Daniel Teklehaimanot and Meron Teshome)
2nd National Time Trial Championships
