= Heidi Dalton =

South African cyclist (born 1995)

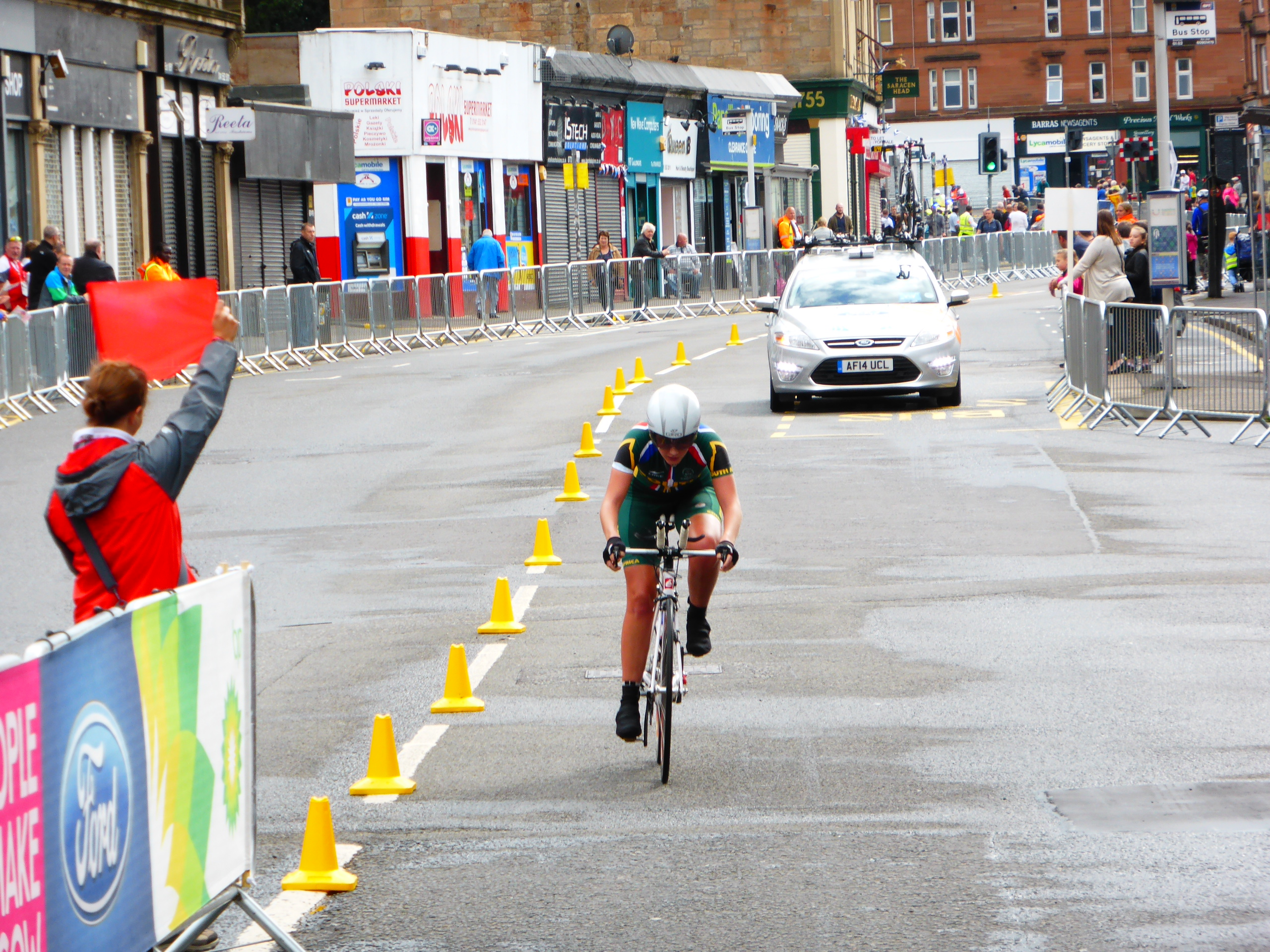
- Dalton at the 2014 Commonwealth Games

Personal information
- Full name: Heidi Dalton
- Born: 21 March 1995 (age 31) Richards Bay, South Africa

Cycling career
- Sport: Cycling
- Discipline: Road
- Role: Rider

Amateur teams
- 2017: Demacon Ladies Cycling Team
- 2018–2020: Demacon Ladies Cycling Team

Professional teams
- 2014: Lotto–Belisol Ladies
- 2016: Bizkaia–Durango
- 2017–2018: Aromitalia Vaiano

Heidi Dalton (born 21 March 1995) is a South African racing cyclist, who most recently rode for the South African amateur outfit, Demacon Ladies Cycling Team. She rode at the 2014 UCI Road World Championships. In 2017, she won the South African National Road Race Championships.

== Major results ==
2013
African Junior Road Championships

1st Time trial
1st Team time trial
4th Road race

National Junior Road Championships

1st Road race
1st Time trial

2014
National Road Championships

2nd Time trial
3rd Road race

2015
African Road Championships

1st Team time trial
2nd Time trial
8th Road race

African Games

2nd Team time trial
7th Time trial

3rd Time trial, National Road Championships
KZN Autumn Series

4th Hibiscus Cycle Classic
8th PMB Road Classic

2016
National Road Championships

4th Time trial
5th Road race

2017
National Road Championships

1st Road race
4th Time trial
