= Hayley Preen =

South African cyclist (born 1998)

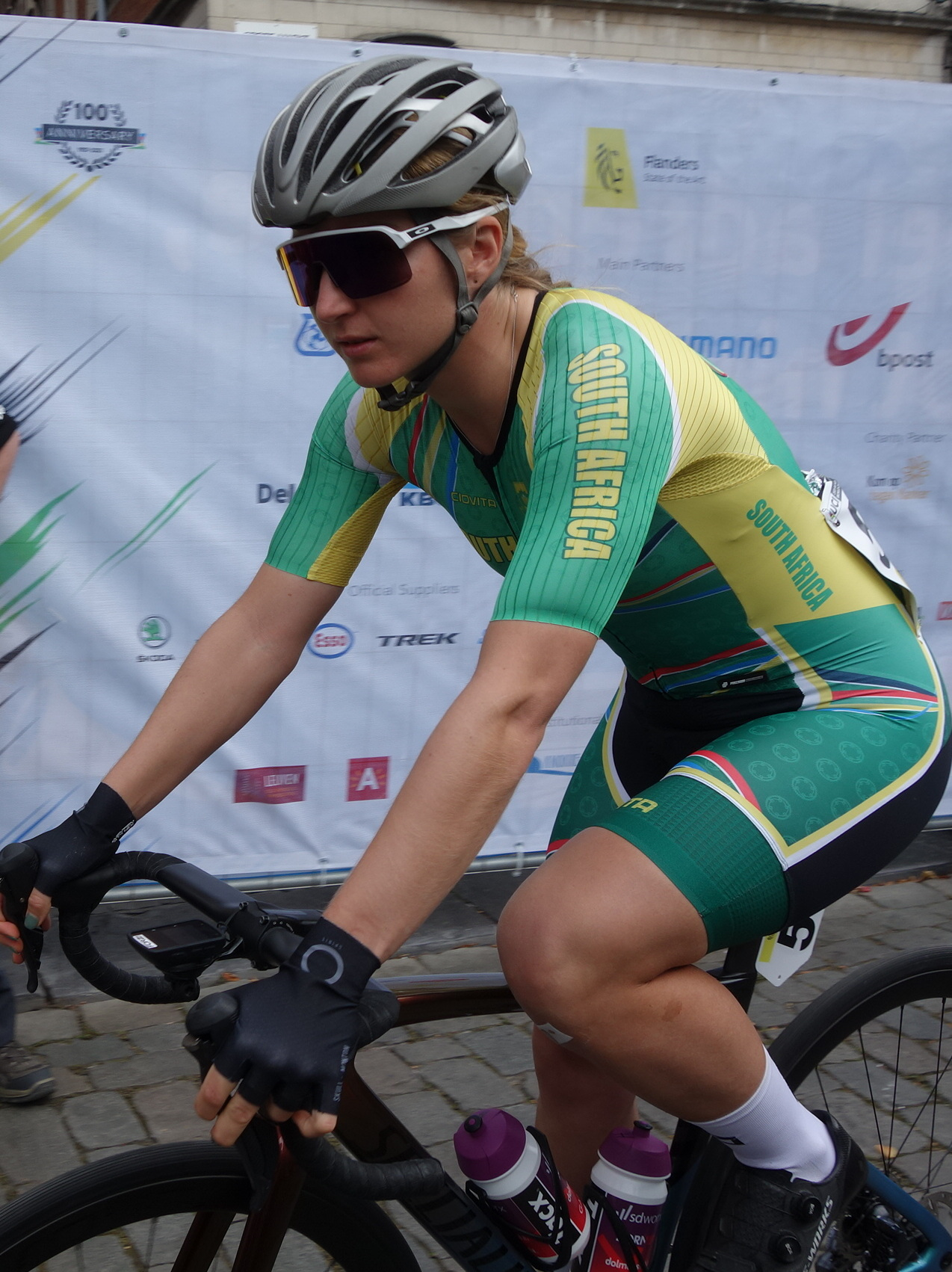
- Preen in 2021

Personal information
- Born: 28 May 1998 (age 28) Cape Town, South Africa

Cycling career
- Sport: Cycling
- Disciplines: Road; Mountain biking
- Role: Rider

Professional teams
- 2022: Torelli–Cayman Islands–Scimitar
- 2023: Torelli

Hayley Preen (born 28 May 1998) is a South African racing cyclist, former equestrian and triathlete, who most recently rode for UCI Women's Continental Team Torelli.

A multiple time medalist at the African Road Championships, she competed at the 2021 and 2022 UCI Road World Championships, in the women's time trial and road race events. She became the South African National Road Race Champion in 2021.

== Major results ==
2021
1st Road race, National Road Championships
African Road Championships

1st Team time trial
1st Mixed team time trial
2nd Road race

2022
2nd Road race, National Road Championships
2023
National Road Championships

1st Criterium
2nd Time trial
4th Road race

2024
National Road Championships

1st Time trial
2nd Road race

African Games

1st Road race
1st Criterium
2nd Team time trial
