= Christopher Lagane =

Mauritian cyclist (born 1998)

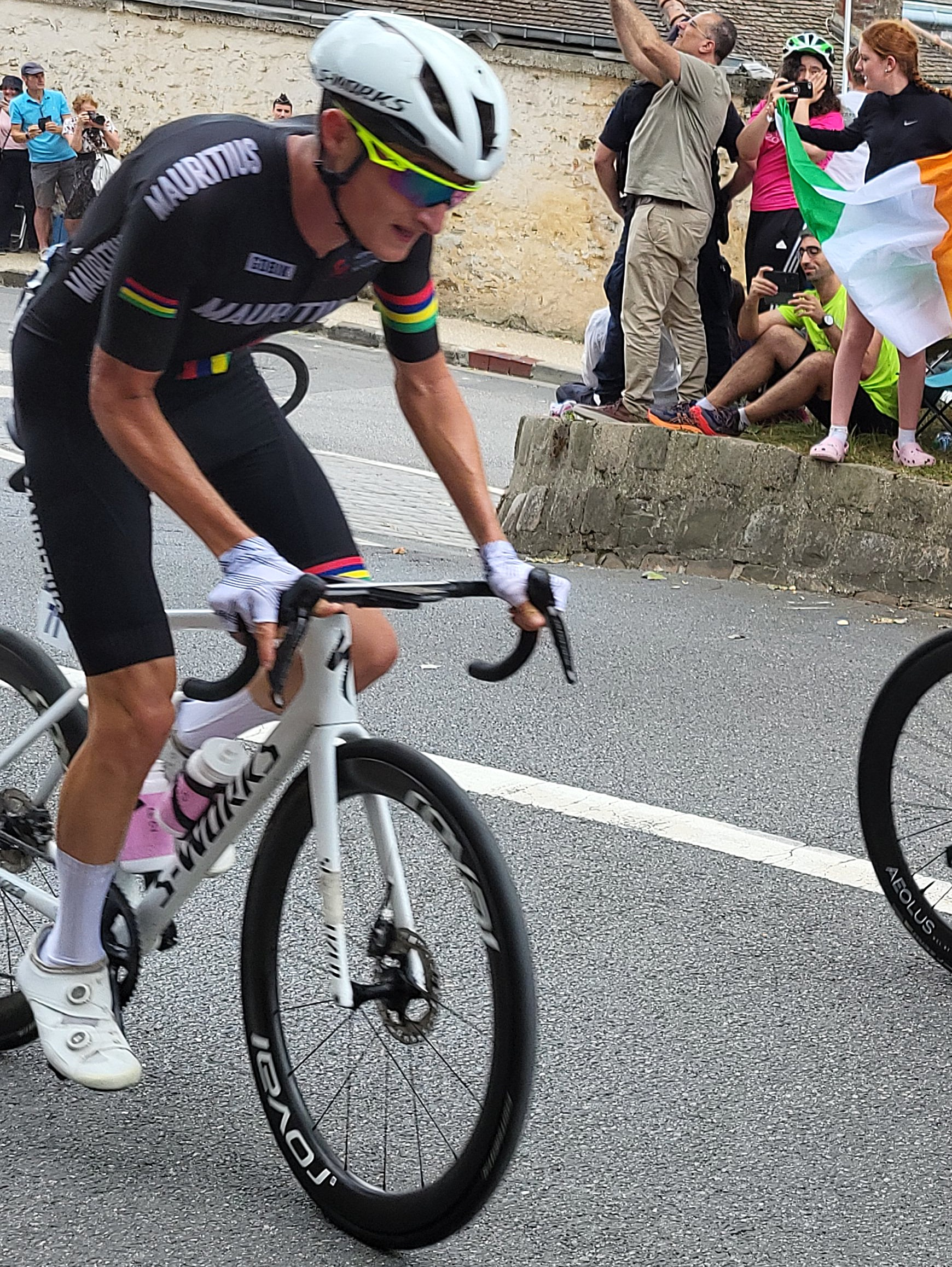
- At the 2024 Summer Olympics

Personal information
- Full name: Christopher Rougier-Lagane
- Born: 24 September 1998 (age 28) Curepipe, Mauritius
- Height: 1.80 m (5 ft 11 in)
- Weight: 69 kg (152 lb)

Cycling career
- Sport: Cycling
- Current team: Team MCB
- Discipline: Road
- Role: Rider

Amateur teams
- 2017: World Cycling Centre
- 2018: Team MCB
- 2018: Team Fybolia-Locminé Auto
- 2019–2020: VC Villefranche Beaujolais
- 2020–2023: Faucon Flacq SC–KFC
- 2021: Team MCB
- 2024–: Team MCB

Christopher Rougier-Lagane (born 24 September 1998) is a Mauritian cyclist, who rides for Mauritian club team Team MCB. He has won the Mauritian national time trial championships five times, and has competed at the 2018 and 2022 Commonwealth Games.

== Career ==
In 2015 Rougier-Lagane went to France for the third consecutive year as a junior to race as part of a development squad. At the national hill climb championships Rougier-Lagane won the overall posting a quicker time than everyone in every category. While riding the Tour Antenne Réunion, in 2022, he fell sick and went from first overall to seven minutes down in stage three. he eventually abandoned before Stage 6. In 2022 Rougier-Lagane won the Tour de Maurice for the second time.

His first UCI podium other than the national championships came in 2023 where he placed third overall in La Tropicale Amissa Bongo. In 2024, he finished third overall and won the final stage of the Tour d'Algérie.

== Major results ==
2015
National Junior Road Championships

1st Road race
1st Time trial

2016
National Junior Road Championships

1st Road race
1st Time trial

African Junior Road Championships

2nd Road race
2nd Time trial

2nd Overall Tour de Maurice
2017
1st Time trial, National Road Championships
1st Overall Tour Cycliste Antenne Réunion
2018
National Road Championships

1st Time trial
2nd Road race

1st Overall Tour Cycliste Antenne Réunion

1st Stages 4 & 7 (ITT)

2nd Overall Tour de Maurice
4th Overall Tour de Limpopo
2019
1st Time trial, National Road Championships
Indian Ocean Island Games

1st Team time trial
2nd Time trial
3rd Road race

3rd Overall Tour de Maurice

1st Prologue (TTT) & Stage 5

2020
2nd Time trial, National Road Championships
2021
1st Time trial, National Road Championships
1st Overall Tour de Maurice

1st Stages 2, 3, 4 (ITT) & 6

2022
1st Mixed relay TTT, African Road Championships
National Road Championships

1st Time trial
5th Road race

1st Overall Tour de Maurice

1st Stages 2, 3 (ITT) & 5

2023
National Road Championships

1st Road race
1st Time trial

African Road Championships

1st Mixed relay TTT
4th Time trial
6th Road race

Indian Ocean Island Games

1st Road race
1st Team time trial
4th Time trial

2nd Overall Tour de Maurice
3rd Overall La Tropicale Amissa Bongo
9th Courts Mammouth Classique de l'île Maurice
2024
African Games

1st Mixed relay
3rd Team time trial

3rd Overall Tour d'Algérie

1st Stage 10

5th Overall Tour de Maurice
5th Grand Prix de la Ville d'Oran
