= Lise Olivier =

South African cyclist (born 1983)

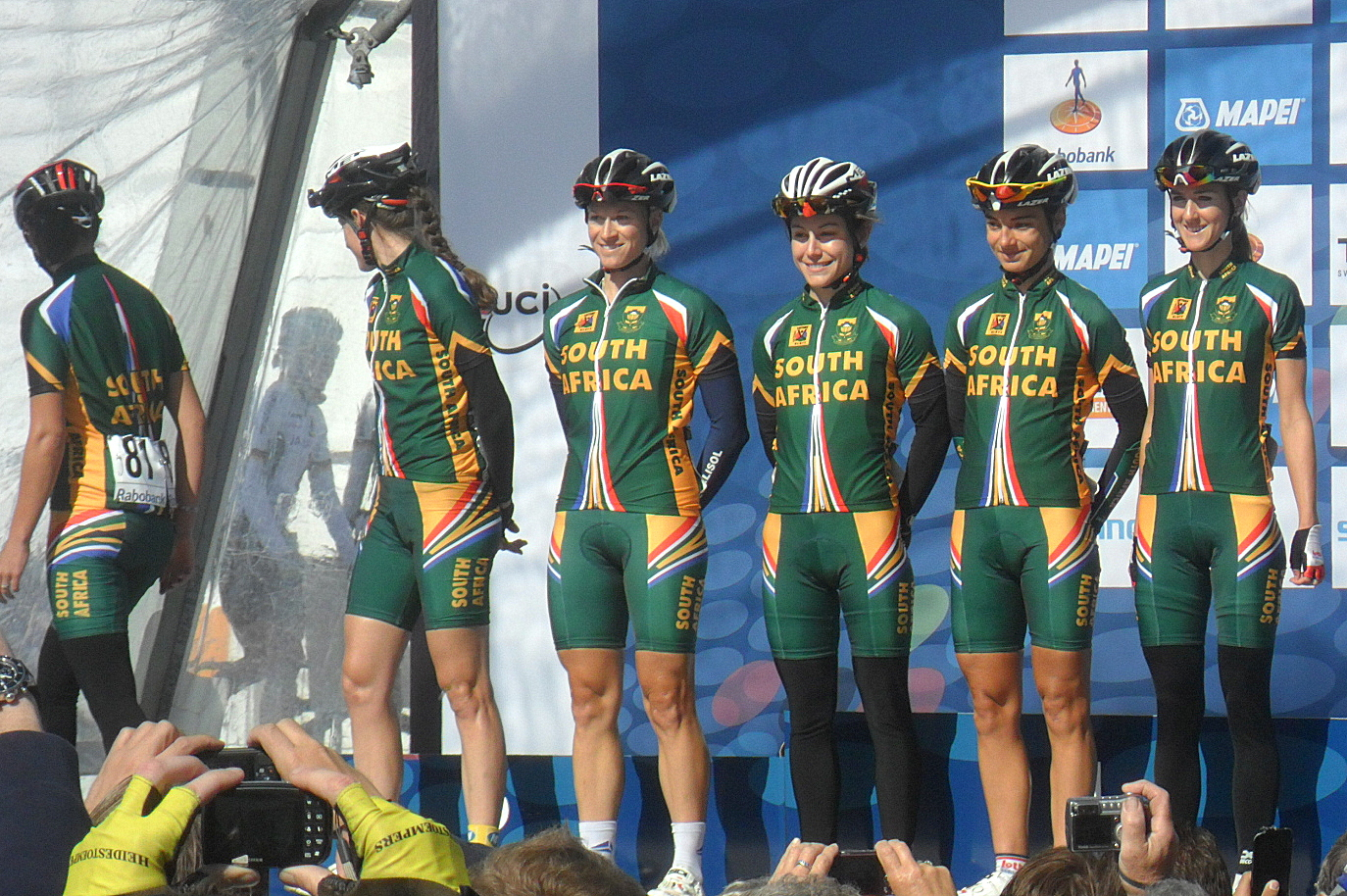
- Olivier, as part of the South African team, at the 2012 UCI Road World Championships

Personal information
- Full name: Lise Olivier
- Born: 30 May 1983 (age 43) Pretoria, South Africa

Cycling career
- Sport: Cycling
- Current team: Retired
- Discipline: Road
- Role: Rider

Amateur teams
- 2010: Team Bizhub
- 2011: Team MTN–Qhubeka
- 2016: Time Freight

Professional teams
- 2012: Lotto–Belisol Ladies
- 2013: Team Futurumshop.nl–Polaris
- 2016: Bizkaia–Durango
Medal record
Women's cycling
Representing South Africa
African Games
Gold medal – first place	2011 Maputo	Time trial
Silver medal – second place	2011 Maputo	Road race
Bronze medal – third place	2015 Brazzaville	Road race
Bronze medal – third place	2015 Brazzaville	Time trial

Lise Olivier (born 30 May 1983) is a South African former road cyclist. She participated at the 2012 UCI Road World Championships.

== Major results ==
2010
2nd Road race, African Road Championships
2011
All-Africa Games

1st Time trial
2nd Road race

2012
2nd Road race, National Road Championships
3rd Road race, African Road Championships
4th Overall La Route de France
2013
3rd Time trial, National Road Championships
2015
African Games

2nd Team time trial
3rd Road race
3rd Time trial

2nd Road race, African Road Championships
KZN Autumn Series

2nd Hibiscus Cycle Classic
3rd Freedom Day Classic

2016
African Road Championships

1st Team time trial
7th Time trial

2nd Road race, National Road Championships
3rd 947 Cycle Challenge
