= Tour of Eritrea =

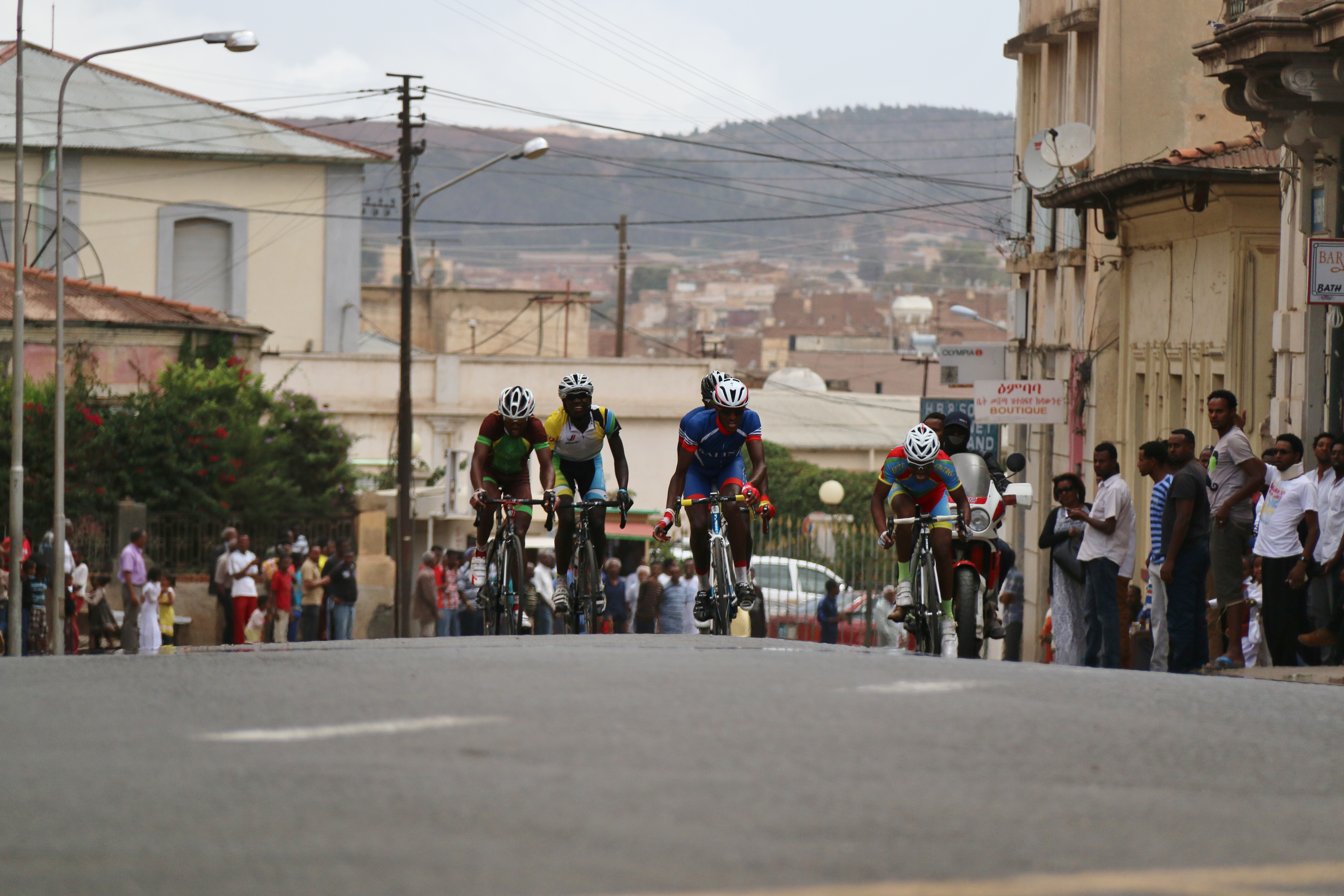
- Cyclists competing in the Tour of Eritrea in Asmara, Eritrea.

Race details
- Date: April
- Region: Eritrea
- English name: Tour of Eritrea
- Local name(s): ዙር ኤርትራ (Tigrinya)
- Discipline: Road race
- Type: Multi-stage
- Organiser: Eritrean National Cycling Federation
- Race director: Aklilu Lijam

History
- First edition: 1946
- Editions: 16 (as of 2017)
- First winner: Nunzio Barrilà (ITA)
- Most wins: Habte Weldesimon (ERI) (3 wins)
- Most recent: Zemenfes Solomon (ERI)

The Tour of Eritrea (Tigrinya: ዙር ኤርትራ, Italian: Giro dell’ Eritrea) is a multistage bicycle race held annually throughout Eritrea.

== History ==
The first race was staged in 1946. It was promoted by the Italian community of Eritrea with the Italian name Primo Giro dell'Eritrea. Its inaugural Tour of Eritrea had 34 participants and was won by Nunzio Barrilà of the team A.C. Piemonte. It had five stages, with a very difficult Premio della Montagna (Stage of the Mountain).

In 1947, the second Giro dell'Eritrea was not allowed because of political reasons related to a growing guerrilla war in British occupied Eritrea. However, a smaller Giro/Tour was held in its place called the Giro delle 3 Valli ("Tour of the 3 Valleys"). It was won by Esmiles Zoli.

In 2001, after a fifty-year-long hiatus, the Tour was resurrected as celebration of the tenth anniversary of the Eritrean independence. It was won by Habte Weldesimon, who repeated his victory in 2003 and 2004.

Merhawi Ghebrehiwot won both the 2007 and 2008 Tours. In 2009 the tour of Eritrea was recognized by the UCI for the first time. It was given a 2.2 HC and included 5 stages. The winner was Meron Russom; Bereket Yemane got the jersey awarded for the best climber. As of 2014, the latest tour was held in 2013 and was won by Mekseb Abrha Debesay. A book of Eritrea’s cycling history 1936-2012 was published by Mewael Mehansho.

== 2008 results ==
Podium of the 2008 edition:

1. Merhawi Ghebrehiwot (team EriTel) with 47.00 points
2. Dawit Haile (team Asbeco) with 40.00 points
3. Frekalsi Debesay with 37.00 points

The last stage (in Asmara, done April 20) was won by Domenico Vaccaro, an Italian Eritrean, of the team Medeber.

== Route ==
The Tour's route has changed since the colonial period. It consists today of a 670 km (420 mi) race contended in 5 stages. The race covers various geographic regions, including the desert lowlands, the chilly highlands and windy coast.

The race usually starts off at the beaches of Massawa, up the winding mountain highway with its precipitous valleys and cliffs to the capital Asmara. From there, it continued downwards onto the western plains of the Gash-Barka Region, only to return to Asmara from the south.

This is, by far, the most popular sport in modern Eritrea, followed by many thousands of fans and with nearly 100 professional Eritrean cyclists. Indeed, the Tour of Eritrea is followed enthusiastically by the Eritrean population around the roads, like happens in the Tour de France and the Giro d'Italia.

== Jersey ==
During the Tour, the previous stage's winner is awarded a blue jersey in recognition of their achievement. A red jersey is awarded to those who win the climbing contest while the yellow jersey is worn by the overall Tour leader.

== Winners ==
Year	Country	Rider	Team
1946	Italy	Nunzio Barrilà	A.C. Piemonte
1947– 2000	No race		
2001	Eritrea	Habte Weldesimon	
2002	Eritrea	Michael Tekle	
2003	Eritrea	Habte Weldesimon	
2004	Eritrea	Habte Weldesimon	
2005	Eritrea	Michael Teku	
2006	Eritrea	Michael Misgane	
2007	Eritrea	Merhawi Gebrehiwet	
2008	Eritrea	Merhawi Gebrehiwet	
2009	Eritrea	Bereket Yemane	Eritrea national team
2010	Eritrea	Natnael Berhane	Eritrea national team
2011	Eritrea	Meron Russom	Eritrea national team
2012	South Africa	Jacques Janse van Rensburg	MTN–Qhubeka
2013	Eritrea	Mekseb Debesay	Eritrea national team
2014– 2015	No race		
2016	Eritrea	Merhawi Goitom	Eritrea national team
2017	Eritrea	Zemenfes Solomon	Eritrea national team
