= Lynette Burger =

South African cyclist

Personal information
- Full name: Lynette Burger
- Born: 4 November 1980 (age 45) Krugersdorp, South Africa

Cycling career
- Sport: Cycling
- Current team: Retired
- Discipline: Road
- Role: Rider

Amateur teams
- 2007: Harmony Schwinn
- 2007: Cycle Lab / Supercycle
- 2018–2019: Demacon Ladies

Professional team
- 2010: Lotto Ladies Team

Lynette Burger (born 4 November 1980) is a South African former road cyclist. She represented her nation at the 2008 UCI Road World Championships. She won National Classic Cycle Race and Tshwane Diamond Classic in 2019.

== Major results ==
2006
2nd Time trial, National Road Championships
2008
3rd Time trial, National Road Championships
2009
African Road Championships

1st Time trial
2nd Road race

National Road Championships

1st Road race
2nd Time trial

2011
All-Africa Games

1st Road race
3rd Time trial

2015
1st Team time trial, African Road Championships
3rd Road race, National Road Championships
2018
3rd Road race, National Road Championships
