= Mohamed Abdel Fattah (cyclist) =

Egyptian cyclist (born 1976)

Personal information
- Nationality: Egyptian
- Born: 20 November 1976 (age 48)
- Height: 1.74 m (5 ft 9 in)
- Weight: 69 kg (152 lb)

Sport
- Sport: Cycling

Mohamed Abdel Fattah Magid (born 20 November 1976) is an Egyptian cyclist. He competed in the 2000 Summer Olympics.
