= Temesgen Buru =

Ethiopian cyclist (born 1994)

Personal information
- Full name: Temesgen Mebrahtu Buru
- Born: 16 November 1994 (age 31) Mekelle, Ethiopia

Cycling career
- Sport: Cycling
- Discipline: Road
- Role: Rider

Amateur teams
- 2017: Rémy Meder
- 2018: World Cycling Centre Africa

Professional teams
- 2016: Burgos BH
- 2019: ProTouch

Temesgen Mebrahtu Buru (born 16 November 1994 in Mekelle) is an Ethiopian cyclist.

== Major results ==
2014
6th Overall Tour of Rwanda
2015
African Road Championships

3rd Team time trial
3rd Under-23 road race
4th Under-23 time trial

2016
7th Overall Tour of Rwanda
2017
2nd Time trial, National Road Championships
4th Road race, African Road Championships
2018
Africa Cup

3rd Team time trial
5th Time trial
8th Road race

3rd Time trial, National Road Championships
2019
National Road Championships

2nd Time trial
2nd Road race

African Road Championships

3rd Team time trial
6th Time trial

6th Road race, African Games
