= Merhawi Goitom =

Eritrean cyclist

Personal information
- Born: 8 February 1996 (age 30)

Cycling career
- Sport: Cycling
- Discipline: Road
- Role: Rider

Amateur team
- 2016: Tsinaat

Merhawi Goitom (born 8 February 1996) is an Eritrean racing cyclist.

== Major results ==
2016
1st Overall Tour of Eritrea

1st Young rider classification
1st Stage 3

6th Fenkil Northern Red Sea Challenge
