= Nahom Zeray =

Eritrean cyclist

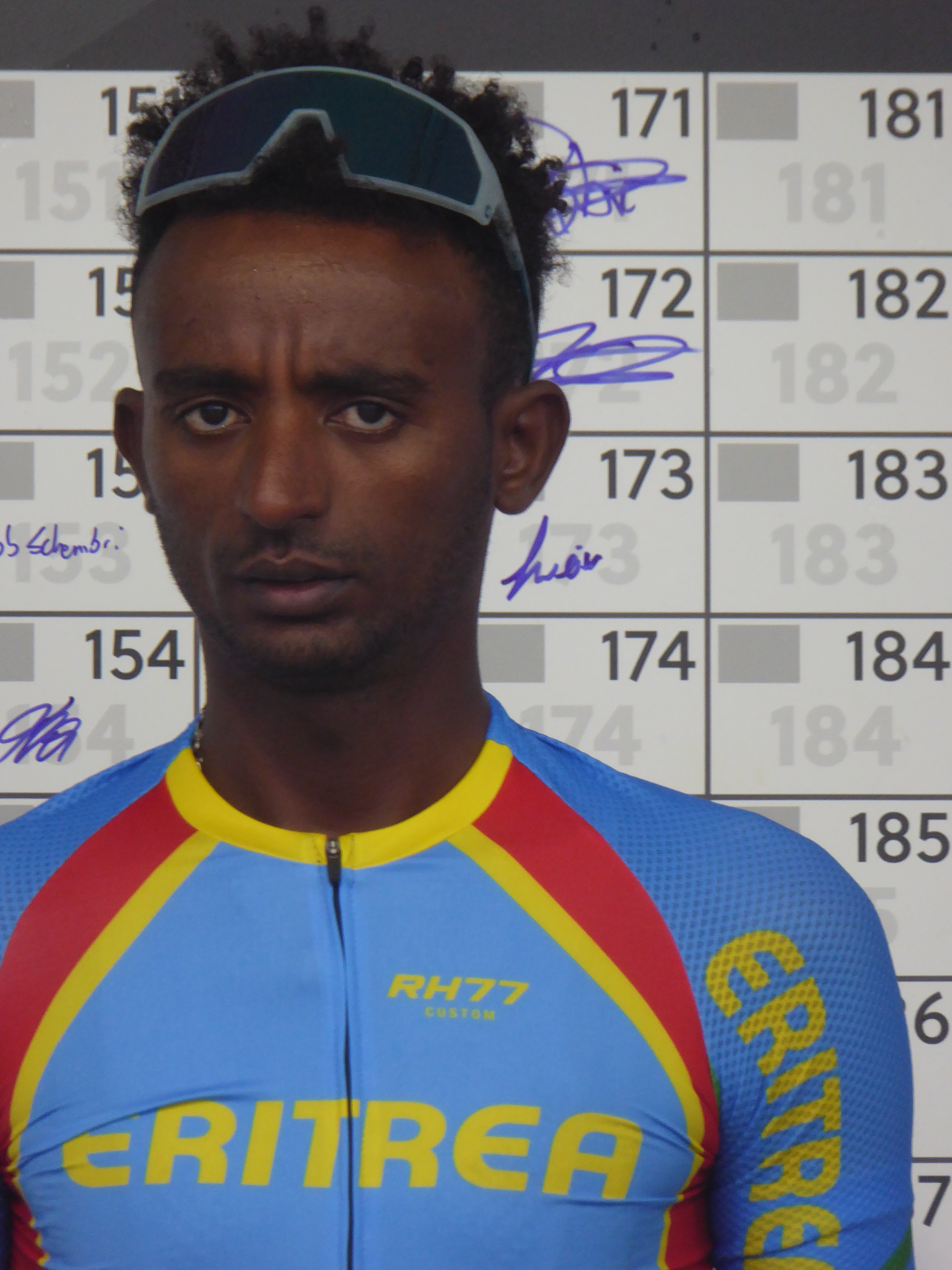
- Zeray in 2023

Personal information
- Full name: Nahom Zeray Araya
- Born: 12 September 2002 (age 24)

Cycling career
- Sport: Cycling
- Current team: Team UKYO
- Discipline: Road
- Role: Rider

Professional teams
- 2022–2024: Team Qhubeka
- 2025–: Team UKYO

Major wins
- One-day races and Classics National Road Race Championships (2025)

Nahom Zeray Araya (born 12 September 2002) is an Eritrean cyclist, who currently rides for UCI Continental team Team UKYO.

== Career ==
In 2024 Zeray won two individual gold meals at the African Games, winning both the under-23 and elite Criterium. Zeray won his first professional bike race in 2025 at the Tour du Rwanda where he beat second placed Milan Donie by 10 seconds.

== Major results ==
2019
3rd Time trial, National Junior Road Championships
2021
9th Overall Tour du Rwanda

1st African rider classification

2022
7th Giro del Medio Brenta
2023
2nd Team time trial, African Road Championships
3rd Sulle Strade di Marco Pantani
10th Giro del Medio Brenta
2024
African Games

1st Criterium
1st Under-23 criterium
1st Team time trial
3rd Mixed relay
3rd Under-23 road race
8th Road race

1st Piccola Sanremo
2nd Zanè–Monte Cengio
3rd G.P. Santa Rita
3rd Bassano–Monte Grappa
7th Gran Premio Sportivi di Poggiana
2025 (2)
1st Road race, National Road Championships
1st Stage 6 Tour du Rwanda
1st Stage 6 Tour of Japan
