= Yannick Lincoln =

Mauritian cyclist (born 1982)

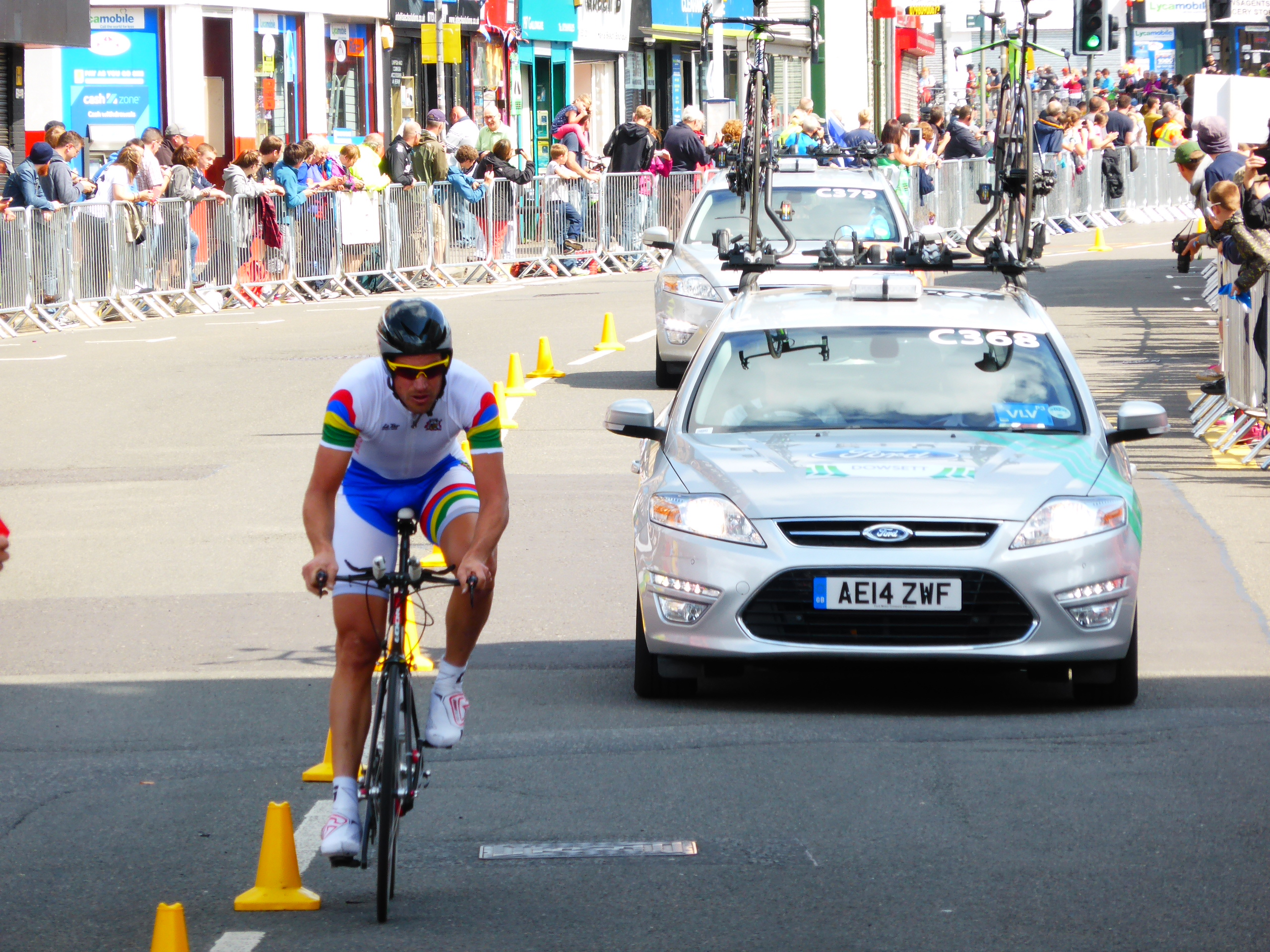
- Lincoln at the 2014 Commonwealth Games

Personal information
- Born: 30 December 1982 (age 43) Curepipe, Mauritius
- Height: 1.87 m (6 ft 2 in)
- Weight: 75 kg (165 lb)

Cycling career
- Sport: Cycling
- Disciplines: Road; Mountain bike
- Role: Rider

Amateur teams
- 2002–2006: GSC Blagnac
- 2018: Team MCB
- 2020–2024: Moka Rangers SC
- 2021: Team MCB

Yannick Lincoln (born 30 December 1982) is a Mauritian cyclist, who most recently rode for Mauritian amateur team Moka Rangers SC. He has won numerous national titles, and has competed at the 2006, 2010, 2014 and 2022 Commonwealth Games.

== Major results ==
=== Road ===
2003
Indian Ocean Island Games

1st Team time trial
2nd Time trial
2nd Road race

2005
1st Overall Tour de Maurice

1st Prologue

10th Time trial, African Road Championships
2006
3rd Overall Tour de Maurice
African Road Championships

8th Time trial
9th Road race

2007
National Road Championships

1st Time trial
3rd Road race

1st Overall Tour de Maurice
3rd Team time trial, Indian Ocean Island Games
6th Road race, All-Africa Games
2008
3rd Overall Tour de Maurice

1st Stage 3

African Road Championships

4th Time trial
10th Road race

2009
National Road Championships

1st Time trial
2nd Road race

2nd Overall Tour de Maurice
African Road Championships

4th Time trial
6th Road race

2010
National Road Championships

1st Time trial
3rd Road race

2nd Overall Tour de Maurice

1st Stages 1 & 5

10th Time trial, African Road Championships
2011
Indian Ocean Island Games

1st Time trial
1st Team time trial

1st Time trial, National Road Championships
1st Overall Tour de Maurice

1st Stages 1 & 5

All-Africa Games

2nd Team time trial
4th Time trial
6th Road race

2012
1st Time trial, National Road Championships
1st Overall Tour de Maurice
10th Time trial, African Road Championships
2013
1st Time trial, National Road Championships
1st Overall Tour de Maurice

1st Stage 6

2014
1st Overall Tour de Maurice

1st Stage 1 (TTT)

2015
Indian Ocean Island Games

1st Road race
2nd Team time trial
2nd Time trial

1st Time trial, National Road Championships
2017
2nd Time trial, National Road Championships
2nd Overall Tour de Maurice

1st Stages 1 & 5

2018
National Road Championships

2nd Time trial
3rd Road race

2019
Indian Ocean Island Games

1st Team time trial
3rd Time trial

2020
National Road Championships

1st Time trial
2nd Road race

3rd Overall Tour de Maurice
2021
National Road Championships

2nd Road race
2nd Time trial

2022
4th Time trial, National Road Championships
2023
3rd Time trial, National Road Championships

=== Mountain bike ===
2013
2nd Cross-country, African Championships
2015
1st Cross-country, National Championships
2016
1st Cross-country marathon, African Championships
2017
African Championships

2nd Cross-country marathon
3rd Cross-country

2019
1st Cross-country, National Championships
2nd Cross-country marathon, African Games
2021
3rd Cross-country, National Championships
2022
National Championships

2nd Cross-country marathon
2nd Cross-country
