= Juanita Venter =

South African racing cyclist (born 1976)

Personal information
- Full name: Juanita Venter
- Born: 2 August 1976 (age 50)

Cycling career
- Sport: Cycling
- Role: Rider

Major wins
- One-day races and Classics National Time Trial Championships (2016)

Juanita Venter (born 2 August 1976) is a South African professional racing cyclist. In February 2016 she won the South African National Time Trial Championships.
