= Herald Cycle Tour =

Annual cycle race in Gqeberha, South Africa

The Herald Cycle Tour is an annual cycle race held in Gqeberha, South Africa. It features both 105 km and 46 km road race events.

== History ==
The Herald was started in 1986 by Rob Rudman, Peter Dickason, and Tony Lutz. The first Herald Cycle Tour in 1986 had 350 competitors, by 2007 there were over 3500 cyclists competing in the event.

== Results ==
Men:

- 2003- Nicolas White: 2hrs 31min
- 2004- Jamie Ball: 2hrs 38min
- 2005- Malcolm Lange: 2hrs 38min
- 2006- Noland Hoffmann: 2hrs 28min
- 2007- Janse van Rensburg: 2hrs 33min
- 2008- Janse van Rensburg: 2hrs 35min
