= Marissa Stander Van der Merwe =

South African cyclist (born 1978)

Marissa Stander Van der Merve
Personal information
- Full name: Marissa Stander Van der Merve
- Born: 30 August 1978 (age 48) Pretoria, South Africa
- Height: 1.68 m (5 ft 6 in)
- Weight: 57 kg (126 lb)

Cycling career
- Sport: Cycling
- Current team: Retired
- Discipline: Road
- Role: Rider

Professional teams
- 2008–2010: MTN Cycling
- 2011: Lotto Honda Team

Major wins
- South African Championships (ITT) (2008); South African Championships (Road) (2011)
Medal record
Women's cycling
Representing South Africa
All-Africa Games
Silver medal – second place	2007 Algiers	Road race

Marissa Stander Van der Merwe (born 30 August 1978 in Pretoria) is a retired South African professional road cyclist. She has awarded two South African championship titles each in both road race and time trial, and later represented her nation South Africa at the 2008 Summer Olympics. Marissa also raced for the nation's MTN Cycling team before her official retirement in 2011.

Marissa made her official debut at the 2007 All-Africa Games in Algiers, Algeria, where she won the silver medal in the women's road race with a final time of 2:00:54, finishing behind her teammate Yolandi du Toit.

At the 2008 Summer Olympics in Beijing, Marissa qualified for the South African squad in the women's road race by receiving one of the nation's two available berths from the UCI World Cup. She successfully completed a grueling race with a thirty-fourth-place effort in 3:33:17, surpassing Great Britain's Sharon Laws and the Netherlands' Mirjam Melchers by a few inches. On that same year, Marissa earned the women's time trial title in her first and only attempt at the South African Championships in East London.

== Career highlights ==
2006
2nd South African Championships (Road), Port Elizabeth (RSA)
2007
2nd All-Africa Games, Algiers (ALG)
2nd South African Championships (Road), South Africa
3rd South African Championships (ITT), South Africa
2008
1st South African Championships (ITT), East London (RSA)
34th Olympic Games (Road), Beijing (CHN)
2009
3rd South African Championships (ITT), Oudtshoorn (RSA)
2011
1st South African Championships (Road), Port Elizabeth (RSA)
