= South African National Time Trial Championships =

National road cycling championship in South Africa

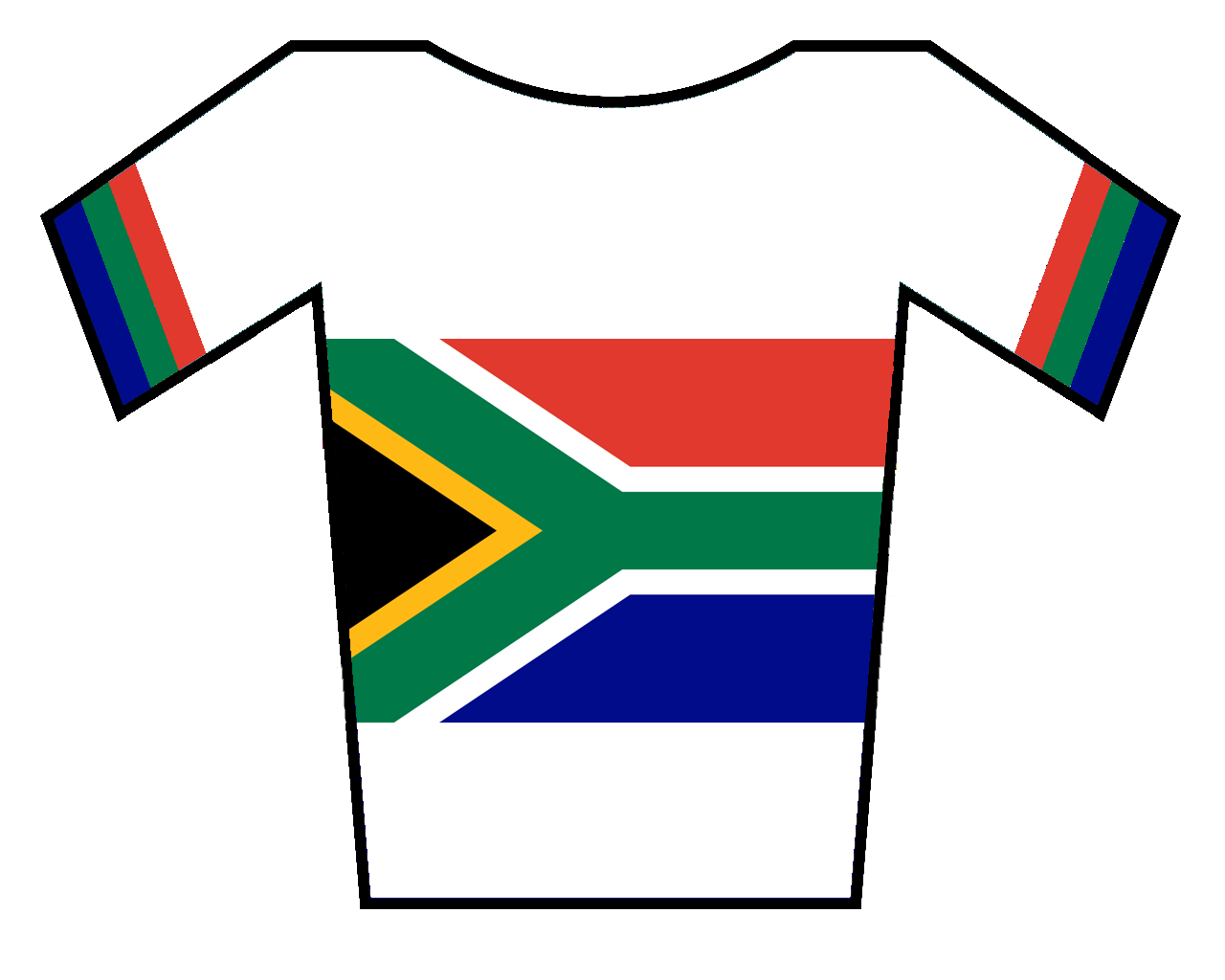
The champion's jersey

The South African National Time Trial Championship is a road bicycle race that takes place inside the South African National Cycling Championship, and decides the best cyclist in this type of race. The first race winner of the time trial championship was Malcolm Lange in 1997; Daryl Impey holds the record with 9 wins. The women's record is held by Ronel Van Wyk with 6 wins.

== Multiple winners ==
Name	Wins	Years
Daryl Impey	9	2011, 2013, 2014, 2015, 2016, 2017, 2018, 2019, 2020
David George	5	2001, 2004, 2006, 2007, 2009
Malcolm Lange	2	1997, 1998
James Lewis Perry	2	2002, 2008

== Men ==
=== Elite ===
Year	Gold	Silver	Bronze
1997	Malcolm Lange	Christopher Mountjoy	Douglas Ryder
1998	Malcolm Lange (2)	Simon Kessler	Nicholas White
1999	Morne Bester	Simon Kessler	Rudolf Wentzel
2000	Robert Hunter	David George	Simon Kessler
2001	David George	Ryan Cox	Nicholas White
2002	James Lewis Perry	Nicholas White	Ryan Cox
2003	Jeremy Maartens	David George	Nicholas White
2004	David George (2)	Tiaan Kannemeyer	Nicholas White
2005	Tiaan Kannemeyer	Ryan Cox	David George
2006	David George (3)	Nicholas White	Alexander Pavlov
2007	David George (4)	James Lewis Perry	Nicholas White
2008	James Lewis Perry (2)	Nicholas White	Kevin Evans
2009	David George (5)	James Lewis Perry	Jay Robert Thomson
2010	Kevin Evans	James Lewis Perry	Jaco Venter
2011	Daryl Impey	Jay Thomson	Darren Lill
2012	Reinardt Janse van Rensburg	Jay Thomson	Johann Rabie
2013	Daryl Impey (2)	Jay Thomson	Johann Rabie
2014	Daryl Impey (3)	Jay Thomson	Jaco Venter
2015	Daryl Impey (4)	Reinardt Janse van Rensburg	Louis Meintjes
2016	Daryl Impey (5)	Reinardt Janse van Rensburg	Johann Van Zyl
2017	Daryl Impey (6)	Willie Smit	Reinardt Janse van Rensburg
2018	Daryl Impey (7)	Ryan Gibbons	Rohan Du Plooy
2019	Daryl Impey (8)	Stefan de Bod	Louis Meintjes
2020	Daryl Impey (9)	Stefan de Bod	Kent Main
2021	Ryan Gibbons	Matthew Beers	Kent Main
2022	Byron Munton	Kent Main	Brandon Downes
2023	Stefan de Bod	Alan Hatherly	Brandon Downes
2024	Ryan Gibbons	Alan Hatherly	Brandon Downes

=== Under-23 ===
Year	Gold	Silver	Bronze
2008	Jay Robert Thomson	Johann Rabie	Jaco Venter
2009	Jaco Venter	Burry Stander	Johann Rabie
2010	Reinardt Janse van Rensburg	Paul van Zweel	David Brown
2011	Johann van Zyl	Louis Meintjes	Reinardt Janse van Rensburg
2012	Louis Meintjes	Johannes Nel	Myles van Musschenbroek
2013	Louis Meintjes	Johannes Nel	Willie Smit
2014	Louis Meintjes	Nick Dougall	Rohan du Plooy
2015	Morné van Niekerk	Nicholas Dlamini	Gustav Basson
2016	Stefan de Bod	Ryan Gibbons	Keagan Girdlestone
2018	Stefan de Bod	Kent Main	Gregory De Vink
2019	Byron Munton	Gregory De Vink	Andries Nigrini
2020	Byron Munton	Marc Pritzen	Jean-Pierre Lloyd
2021	Marc Pritzen	Jason Oosthuizen	Callum Ormiston
2022	Tiano Da Silva	Jason Eggett	Callum Ormiston
2023	Dillon Geary	Travis Stedman	Tiano Da Silva
2024	Dillon Geary	Pedri Crause	Travis Stedman

== Women ==
=== Elite ===
Year	Gold	Silver	Bronze
1998	Magdalena Day	Annelie Colyn	Erica Green
1999	Ronel Van Wyk	Tracey Jordaan	Christine Strydom
2000	Ronel Van Wyk	Annelise Stander	Frederika Frick
2001	Ronel Van Wyk	Adriana Fouché	Thea Barkhuizen
2002	Ronel Van Wyk	Lynette Jansen-Van Vuuren	Diana McPherson
2003	Ronel Van Wyk	Nicolene Schepers	Engela Conradie
2004	Anke Erlank	Altie Pienaar	Ronel Van Wyk
2005	Anke Erlank	Ronel Van Wyk	Altie Pienaar
2006	Cashandra Slingerland	Lynette Burger	Samantha Oosthuizen
2007	Ronel Van Wyk	Millecia Munro	Marissa van der Merwe
2008	Marissa van der Merwe	Cashandra Slingerland	Lynette Burger
2009	Cashandra Slingerland	Lynette Burger	Marissa van der Merwe
2010	Cashandra Slingerland	Lilanie Louwrens	Carla Swart
2011	Cherise Taylor	Ashleigh Moolman	Cashandra Slingerland
2012	Cherise Taylor	Ashleigh Moolman	An-Li Kachelhoffer
2013	Ashleigh Moolman	Lee-Zaan Hinrichsen	Lise Olivier
2014	Ashleigh Moolman	Heidi Dalton	Leandri du Toit
2015	Ashleigh Moolman	Cherise Stander	Heidi Dalton
2016	Juanita Venter	Samantha Sanders	Cashandra Slingerland
2017	Ashleigh Moolman	Juanita Venter	Brittany Peterson
2018	Liezel Jordaan	Yzette Oelofse	S'annara Grove
2019	Liezel Jordaan	Zanri Rossouw	Juanita Venter
2020	Ashleigh Moolman	Carla Oberholzer	Frances Janse van Rensburg
2021	Candice Lill	Carla Oberholzer	Zanri Rossouw
2022	Carla Oberholzer	Zanri Rossouw	Dunnette Shaw
2023	Zanri Rossouw	Hayley Preen	S'annara Grove
2024	Hayley Preen	Emma Pallant	Lucy Young
