= 2021 Team TotalEnergies season =

Team TotalEnergies
- 2021 season
- UCI code: TDE (until 15 June); TEN (since 16 June)
- Status: UCI ProTeam
- World Tour Rank: 22nd
- Manager: Jean-René Bernaudeau (FRA)
- Main sponsor(s): TotalEnergies
- Based: France
- Bicycles: Wilier Triestina

Season victories
- One-day races: 3
- Stage race overall: 1
- Stage race stages: 3
- Most wins: Pierre Latour (FRA); Cristián Rodríguez (ESP); (2 each)
- Best ranked rider: Anthony Turgis (FRA) (86th)

The 2021 season for Team TotalEnergies was the 22nd season in the team's existence and the 12th as a UCI ProTeam.

On 16 June, ahead of the Tour de France, the team announced a rebranding from Total Direct Énergie to Team TotalEnergies, with a corresponding change of kit.

== Team roster ==
As of 13 November 2021.

Rider	Date of birth
Edvald Boasson Hagen (NOR)	17 May 1987 (aged 33)
Leonardo Bonifazio (ITA)	20 March 1991 (aged 29)
Niccolò Bonifazio (ITA)	29 October 1993 (aged 27)
Thomas Bonnet (Note: Bonnet, Jeannière, and Jousseaume joined as stagiaires from Vendée U on 1 August.) (FRA)	13 September 1998 (aged 22)
Mathieu Burgaudeau (FRA)	17 November 1998 (aged 22)
Jérémy Cabot (FRA)	24 July 1991 (aged 29)
Jérôme Cousin (FRA)	5 June 1989 (aged 31)
Víctor de la Parte (ESP)	June 22, 1986 (aged 34)
Fabien Doubey (FRA)	October 21, 1993 (aged 27)
Valentin Ferron (FRA)	8 February 1998 (aged 22)
Marlon Gaillard (FRA)	9 May 1996 (aged 24)
Damien Gaudin (FRA)	20 August 1986 (aged 34)
Alexandre Geniez (FRA)	16 April 1988 (aged 32)
Fabien Grellier (FRA)	31 October 1994 (aged 26)
Emilien Jeannière (FRA)	26 September 1998 (aged 22)

Rider	Date of birth
Alan Jousseaume (FRA)	3 August 1998 (aged 22)
Pierre Latour (FRA)	12 October 1993 (aged 27)
Chris Lawless (GBR)	4 November 1995 (aged 25)
Florian Maitre (FRA)	3 September 1996 (aged 24)
Lorrenzo Manzin (FRA)	26 July 1994 (aged 26)
Paul Ourselin (FRA)	13 April 1994 (aged 26)
Adrien Petit (FRA)	26 September 1990 (aged 30)
Cristián Rodríguez (ESP)	3 March 1995 (aged 25)
Romain Sicard (Note: On 9 April, Sicard, who had yet to make his season debut at that point, announced his premature retirement after he was diagnosed with a cardiac anomaly that prevented him from continuing as a professional cyclist.) (FRA)	1 January 1988 (aged 33)
Julien Simon (FRA)	4 October 1985 (aged 35)
Geoffrey Soupe (FRA)	22 March 1988 (aged 32)
Niki Terpstra (NED)	18 May 1984 (aged 36)
Anthony Turgis (FRA)	16 May 1994 (aged 26)
Dries Van Gestel (BEL)	30 September 1994 (aged 26)
Alexis Vuillermoz (FRA)	1 January 1988 (aged 33)

Riders who joined the team for the 2021 season

Rider	2020 team
Edvald Boasson Hagen	NTT Pro Cycling
Víctor de la Parte	CCC Team
Fabien Doubey	Circus–Wanty Gobert
Alexandre Geniez	AG2R La Mondiale
Pierre Latour	AG2R La Mondiale
Chris Lawless	Ineos Grenadiers
Cristián Rodríguez	Caja Rural–Seguros RGA
Alexis Vuillermoz	AG2R La Mondiale

Riders who left the team during or after the 2020 season

Rider	2021 team
Lilian Calmejane	AG2R Citroën Team
Romain Cardis	St. Michel–Auber93
Jonathan Hivert	B&B Hotels p/b KTM
Pim Ligthart	Retired
Simon Sellier	Retired
Rein Taaramäe	Intermarché–Wanty–Gobert Matériaux

== Season victories ==
Date	Race	Competition	Rider	Country	Location	Ref.
24 January	Clàssica Comunitat Valenciana 1969	UCI Europe Tour	Lorrenzo Manzin (FRA)	Spain	Tavernes de la Valldigna	
2 May	Vuelta Asturias, Stage 3	UCI Europe Tour	Pierre Latour (FRA)	Spain	Alto del Naranco	
5 May	Tour du Rwanda, Stage 4	UCI Africa Tour	Valentin Ferron (FRA)	Rwanda	Musanze	
9 May	Tour du Rwanda, Stage 8	UCI Africa Tour	Cristián Rodríguez (ESP)	Rwanda	Kigali (Canal Olympia)	
9 May	Tour du Rwanda, Overall	UCI Africa Tour	Cristián Rodríguez (ESP)	Rwanda		
24 July	Criterium Cycliste International du Grand Dole	UCI Europe Tour	Pierre Latour (FRA)	France	Dole	
15 August	Grote Prijs Jef Scherens	UCI Europe Tour	Niccolò Bonifazio (ITA)	Belgium	Leuven	
