= List of wins by Vital Concept and its successors =

This is a comprehensive list of victories of the B&B Hotels p/b KTM cycling team. The races are categorized according to the UCI Continental Circuits rules.

== 2018 Vital Concept ==
Stage 1 (ITT) Sharjah Tour, Julien Morice
Stage 1 Tour of Oman, Bryan Coquard
Grand Prix de la Ville de Lillers Souvenir Bruno Comini, Jérémy Lecroq
Stage 4 4 Jours de Dunkerque, Bryan Coquard
Stage 5 Belgium Tour, Bryan Coquard
Stage 5 Tour de Savoie Mont Blanc, Quentin Pacher
Stage 4 Tour du Limousin, Lorrenzo Manzin
Omloop van het Houtland Lichtervelde, Jonas van Genechten

== 2019 Vital Concept–B&B Hotels ==
Stages 4 & 7 La Tropicale Amissa Bongo, Lorrenzo Manzin
Stage 1 Étoile de Bessèges, Bryan Coquard
Volta Limburg Classic, Patrick Müller
Stage 2 Circuit Cycliste Sarthe - Pays de la Loire, Bryan Coquard
Overall Le Tour de Bretagne Cycliste, Lorrenzo Manzin
Stage 4 Four Days of Dunkirk, Bryan Coquard
Grand Prix de la Somme, Lorrenzo Manzin
Stage 4 4 Jours de Dunkerque, Bryan Coquard
Grote Prijs Marcel Kint, Bryan Coquard
Stage 3 Boucles de la Mayenne, Bryan Coquard
Stage 5 Tour of Belgium, Bryan Coquard
Grand Prix Cerami, Bryan Coquard
Stage 2 Arctic Race of Norway, Bryan Coquard

== 2020 B&B Hotels–Vital Concept ==
Malaysian International Classic Race, Johan Le Bon
Stage 1 Route d'Occitanie, Bryan Coquard
Overall Tour de Savoie Mont-Blanc, Pierre Rolland

Stage 3, Pierre Rolland

== 2021 B&B Hotels p/b KTM ==
Stages 2, 3 & 5 Tour du Rwanda, Alan Boileau
Stage 6 Tour du Rwanda, Pierre Rolland
Prologue Tour de Savoie Mont-Blanc, Maxime Chevalier
Stage 3 Tour de Savoie Mont-Blanc, Alan Boileau

== 2022 B&B Hotels–KTM ==
Stage 7 Tour du Rwanda, Alan Boileau
Stage 2 Alpes Isère Tour, Quentin Jaurégui
Stage 3 Alpes Isère Tour, Victor Koretzky
Polynormande, Franck Bonnamour
Stage 4 CRO Race, Axel Laurance

== Supplementary statistics ==
Grand Tours by highest finishing position
Race	2018	2019	2020	2021	2022
Giro d'Italia	–	–	–	–	–
Tour de France	–	–	18	22	34
Vuelta a España	–	–	–	–	–
Major week-long stage races by highest finishing position
Race	2018	2019	2020	2021	2022
Tour Down Under	–	–	–	NH	
Paris–Nice	–	20	33	22	28
Tirreno–Adriatico	–	–	–	–	–
Volta a Catalunya	–	–	NH	–	–
Tour of the Basque Country	–	–	NH	–	–
Tour de Romandie	–	–	NH	–	–
Critérium du Dauphiné	71	66	14	29	51
Tour de Suisse	–	–	NH	–	–
Tour de Pologne	–	–	–	–	–
BinckBank Tour	–	–	–	–	NH
Monuments by highest finishing position
Monument	2018	2019	2020	2021	2022
Milan–San Remo	–	–	–	–	–
Tour of Flanders	71	70	66	46	25
Paris–Roubaix	21	20	NH	20	53
Liège–Bastogne–Liège	–	48	–	–	–
Il Lombardia	–	20	–	–	–
Classics by highest finishing position
Classic	2018	2019	2020	2021	2022
Omloop Het Nieuwsblad	37	–	–	16	26
Kuurne–Brussels–Kuurne	–	38	68	71	25
Strade Bianche	–	52	37	–	–
E3 Harelbeke	68	–	NH	–	41
Gent–Wevelgem	57	–	37	11	74
Amstel Gold Race	30	39	NH	–	41
La Flèche Wallonne	83	–	–	–	56
Clásica de San Sebastián	–	–	NH	–	–
Paris–Tours	20	8	40	2	5

Legend
—	Did not compete
DNF	Did not finish
DNS	Did not start
NH	Not held
