= 2021 Tour du Rwanda =

2021 UCI Africa Tour

Race details
- Dates: 2–9 May 2021 (Note: The race was originally scheduled for 21 to 28 February, but due to the COVID-19 pandemic, it had to be postponed and rescheduled.)
- Stages: 8
- Distance: 913.3 km (567.5 mi)
- Winning time: 22h 49' 51"

Results
Jersey awarded to the overall winner	Winner	Cristián Rodríguez (ESP)	(Total Direct Énergie)
	Second	James Piccoli (CAN)	(Israel Start-Up Nation)
	Third	Alex Hoehn (USA)	(Wildlife Generation Pro Cycling)
Jersey awarded to the mountains classification winner	Mountains	Lennert Teugels (BEL)	(Tarteletto–Isorex)
Jersey awarded to the youth classification winner	Youth	Alan Boileau (FRA)	(B&B Hotels p/b KTM)
Jersey awarded to the sprints classification winner	Sprints	Lennert Teugels (BEL)	(Tarteletto–Isorex)
Jersey awarded to the team classification winner	Team	B&B Hotels p/b KTM	

The 2021 Tour du Rwanda was a road cycling stage race that took place in Rwanda between 2 and 9 May 2021. The race was rated as a category 2.1 event on the 2021 UCI Africa Tour calendar, and was the 24th edition of the Tour du Rwanda.

The race was originally scheduled to be held from 21 to 28 February, but due to the COVID-19 pandemic, it had to be postponed and rescheduled to early May.

== Teams ==
One UCI WorldTeam, three UCI ProTeams, eight UCI Continental teams, and four national teams made up the 16 teams that participated in the race. Each team competed with five riders, for a total of 75 riders, of which 61 finished.

UCI WorldTeams

- Israel Start-Up Nation

UCI ProTeams

- Androni Giocattoli–Sidermec
- B&B Hotels p/b KTM
- Total Direct Énergie

UCI Continental Teams

- Benediction Ignite
- Bike Aid
- Team Medellín–EPM
- ProTouch
- Skol Adrien Cycling Academy
- Tarteletto–Isorex
- Terengganu Cycling Team
- Wildlife Generation Pro Cycling

National Teams

- Algeria
- Eritrea
- Ethiopia
- Rwanda

== Route ==
The complete route of the 2021 Tour du Rwanda was revealed on 29 November 2020. The eight-day stage race covered 913.3 kilometres (567.5 mi) and over 16,347 metres (53,632 ft) of elevation, with 29 categorized climbs and many stages ending with a summit finish. Like in previous editions, the Rwandan capital, Kigali, featured heavily in the race, being a start and/or finish location on all but one of the eight stages. The Mur de Kigali time trial on stage 7, which often draws out large crowds along its infamous cobbled sector, continued to make its appearance in the race.

Stage characteristics and winners
Stage	Date	Course	Distance	Type	Stage winner
1	2 May	Kigali (Kigali Arena) to Rwamagana	115.6 km (71.8 mi)	Hilly stage	Brayan Sánchez (COL)
2	3 May	Kigali (MIC Building) to Huye	120.5 km (74.9 mi)	Hilly stage	Alan Boileau (FRA)
3	4 May	Nyanza to Gicumbi	171.6 km (106.6 mi)	Mountain stage	Alan Boileau (FRA)
4	5 May	Kigali (Kimironko) to Musanze	123.9 km (77.0 mi)	Mountain stage	Valentin Ferron (FRA)
5	6 May	Nyagatare to Kigali (Kimironko)	149.3 km (92.8 mi)	Hilly stage	Alan Boileau (FRA)
6	7 May	Kigali (Rond Point KBC) to Kigali (Mont Kigali)	152.6 km (94.8 mi)	Mountain stage	Pierre Rolland (FRA)
7	8 May	Kigali (Nyamirambo) to Kigali (Mur de Kigali)	4.5 km (2.8 mi)	Individual time trial	Jhonatan Restrepo (COL)
8	9 May	Kigali (Canal Olympia) to Kigali (Canal Olympia)	75.3 km (46.8 mi)	Mountain stage	Cristián Rodríguez (ESP)
Total			913.3 km (567.5 mi)		

== Stages ==
=== Stage 1 ===
2 May 2021 — Kigali (Kigali Arena) to Rwamagana, 115.6 km (71.8 mi)

Stage 1 Result
Rank	Rider	Team	Time
1	Brayan Sánchez (COL)	Team Medellín–EPM	2h 33' 43"
2	Alex Hoehn (USA)	Wildlife Generation Pro Cycling	+ 0"
3	Weimar Roldán (COL)	Team Medellín–EPM	+ 0"
4	Quentin Pacher (FRA)	B&B Hotels p/b KTM	+ 0"
5	Jhonatan Restrepo (COL)	Androni Giocattoli–Sidermec	+ 0"
6	Daniel Muñoz (COL)	Androni Giocattoli–Sidermec	+ 0"
7	Gustav Basson (RSA)	ProTouch	+ 0"
8	Santiago Umba (COL)	Androni Giocattoli–Sidermec	+ 0"
9	Alfdan De Decker (BEL)	Tarteletto–Isorex	+ 0"
10	Alexis Vuillermoz (FRA)	Total Direct Énergie	+ 0"

General classification after Stage 1
Rank	Rider	Team	Time
1	Brayan Sánchez (COL)	Team Medellín–EPM	2h 33' 43"
2	Alex Hoehn (USA)	Wildlife Generation Pro Cycling	+ 0"
3	Weimar Roldán (COL)	Team Medellín–EPM	+ 0"
4	Quentin Pacher (FRA)	B&B Hotels p/b KTM	+ 0"
5	Jhonatan Restrepo (COL)	Androni Giocattoli–Sidermec	+ 0"
6	Daniel Muñoz (COL)	Androni Giocattoli–Sidermec	+ 0"
7	Gustav Basson (RSA)	ProTouch	+ 0"
8	Santiago Umba (COL)	Androni Giocattoli–Sidermec	+ 0"
9	Alfdan De Decker (BEL)	Tarteletto–Isorex	+ 0"
10	Alexis Vuillermoz (FRA)	Total Direct Énergie	+ 0"

=== Stage 2 ===
3 May 2021 — Kigali (MIC Building) to Huye, 120.5 km (74.9 mi)

Stage 2 Result
Rank	Rider	Team	Time
1	Alan Boileau (FRA)	B&B Hotels p/b KTM	3h 07' 14"
2	Santiago Umba (COL)	Androni Giocattoli–Sidermec	+ 6"
3	Brayan Sánchez (COL)	Team Medellín–EPM	+ 8"
4	Norman Vahtra (EST)	Israel Start-Up Nation	+ 8"
5	Gianni Marchand (BEL)	Tarteletto–Isorex	+ 8"
6	Alex Hoehn (USA)	Wildlife Generation Pro Cycling	+ 8"
7	Jhonatan Restrepo (COL)	Androni Giocattoli–Sidermec	+ 8"
8	Salim Kipkemboi (KEN)	Bike Aid	+ 8"
9	Quentin Pacher (FRA)	B&B Hotels p/b KTM	+ 8"
10	Valentin Ferron (FRA)	Total Direct Énergie	+ 8"

General classification after Stage 2
Rank	Rider	Team	Time
1	Santiago Umba (COL)	Androni Giocattoli–Sidermec	5h 41' 03"
2	Brayan Sánchez (COL)	Team Medellín–EPM	+ 2"
3	Alex Hoehn (USA)	Wildlife Generation Pro Cycling	+ 2"
4	Jhonatan Restrepo (COL)	Androni Giocattoli–Sidermec	+ 2"
5	Quentin Pacher (FRA)	B&B Hotels p/b KTM	+ 2"
6	Salim Kipkemboi (KEN)	Bike Aid	+ 2"
7	James Piccoli (CAN)	Israel Start-Up Nation	+ 2"
8	Valentin Ferron (FRA)	Total Direct Énergie	+ 2"
9	Norman Vahtra (EST)	Israel Start-Up Nation	+ 2"
10	Renus Byiza Uhiriwe (RWA)	Rwanda	+ 2"

=== Stage 3 ===
4 May 2021 — Nyanza to Gicumbi, 171.6 km (106.6 mi)

Stage 3 Result
Rank	Rider	Team	Time
1	Alan Boileau (FRA)	B&B Hotels p/b KTM	4h 23' 57"
2	Carlos Quintero (COL)	Terengganu Cycling Team	+ 0"
3	James Piccoli (CAN)	Israel Start-Up Nation	+ 0"
4	Brayan Sánchez (COL)	Team Medellín–EPM	+ 0"
5	Metkel Eyob (ERI)	Terengganu Cycling Team	+ 0"
6	Alex Hoehn (USA)	Wildlife Generation Pro Cycling	+ 0"
7	Alexis Vuillermoz (FRA)	Total Direct Énergie	+ 0"
8	Óscar Sevilla (ESP)	Team Medellín–EPM	+ 0"
9	Cristián Rodríguez (ESP)	Total Direct Énergie	+ 0"
10	Quentin Pacher (FRA)	B&B Hotels p/b KTM	+ 0"

General classification after Stage 3
Rank	Rider	Team	Time
1	Brayan Sánchez (COL)	Team Medellín–EPM	10h 05' 02"
2	Alex Hoehn (USA)	Wildlife Generation Pro Cycling	+ 0"
3	Quentin Pacher (FRA)	B&B Hotels p/b KTM	+ 0"
4	Jhonatan Restrepo (COL)	Androni Giocattoli–Sidermec	+ 0"
5	James Piccoli (CAN)	Israel Start-Up Nation	+ 0"
6	Óscar Sevilla (ESP)	Team Medellín–EPM	+ 0"
7	Carlos Quintero (COL)	Terengganu Cycling Team	+ 0"
8	Cristián Rodríguez (ESP)	Total Direct Énergie	+ 0"
9	Metkel Eyob (ERI)	Terengganu Cycling Team	+ 0"
10	Nahom Zerai (ERI)	Eritrea	+ 6"

=== Stage 4 ===
5 May 2021 — Kigali (Kimironko) to Musanze, 123.9 km (77.0 mi)

Stage 4 Result
Rank	Rider	Team	Time
1	Valentin Ferron (FRA)	Total Direct Énergie	3h 13' 47"
2	Pierre Rolland (FRA)	B&B Hotels p/b KTM	+ 0"
3	Eric Manizabayo (RWA)	Benediction Ignite	+ 4"
4	Tomas Goytom (ERI)	Eritrea	+ 18"
5	Azzedine Lagab (ALG)	Algeria	+ 22"
6	Lennert Teugels (BEL)	Tarteletto–Isorex	+ 27"
7	Jean Bosco Nsengimana (RWA)	Rwanda	+ 46"
8	Brayan Sánchez (COL)	Team Medellín–EPM	+ 1' 29"
9	Alan Boileau (FRA)	B&B Hotels p/b KTM	+ 1' 29"
10	Jhonatan Restrepo (COL)	Androni Giocattoli–Sidermec	+ 1' 29"

General classification after Stage 4
Rank	Rider	Team	Time
1	Brayan Sánchez (COL)	Team Medellín–EPM	13h 20' 18"
2	Alex Hoehn (USA)	Wildlife Generation Pro Cycling	+ 0"
3	Jhonatan Restrepo (COL)	Androni Giocattoli–Sidermec	+ 0"
4	Quentin Pacher (FRA)	B&B Hotels p/b KTM	+ 0"
5	James Piccoli (CAN)	Israel Start-Up Nation	+ 0"
6	Óscar Sevilla (ESP)	Team Medellín–EPM	+ 0"
7	Carlos Quintero (COL)	Terengganu Cycling Team	+ 0"
8	Cristián Rodríguez (ESP)	Total Direct Énergie	+ 0"
9	Metkel Eyob (ERI)	Terengganu Cycling Team	+ 0"
10	Nahom Zerai (ERI)	Eritrea	+ 6"

=== Stage 5 ===
6 May 2021 — Nyagatare to Kigali (Kimironko), 149.3 km (92.8 mi)

Stage 5 Result
Rank	Rider	Team	Time
1	Alan Boileau (FRA)	B&B Hotels p/b KTM	3h 28' 45"
2	Alexis Vuillermoz (FRA)	Total Direct Énergie	+ 0"
3	Metkel Eyob (ERI)	Terengganu Cycling Team	+ 2"
4	Cristián Rodríguez (ESP)	Total Direct Énergie	+ 4"
5	Kent Main (RSA)	ProTouch	+ 6"
6	Alex Hoehn (USA)	Wildlife Generation Pro Cycling	+ 6"
7	James Piccoli (CAN)	Israel Start-Up Nation	+ 6"
8	Jhonatan Restrepo (COL)	Androni Giocattoli–Sidermec	+ 6"
9	Quentin Pacher (FRA)	B&B Hotels p/b KTM	+ 6"
10	Sela Weldemicael (ERI)	Eritrea	+ 11"

General classification after Stage 5
Rank	Rider	Team	Time
1	Metkel Eyob (ERI)	Terengganu Cycling Team	16h 49' 05"
2	Cristián Rodríguez (ESP)	Total Direct Énergie	+ 2"
3	Alex Hoehn (USA)	Wildlife Generation Pro Cycling	+ 4"
4	Jhonatan Restrepo (COL)	Androni Giocattoli–Sidermec	+ 4"
5	Quentin Pacher (FRA)	B&B Hotels p/b KTM	+ 4"
6	James Piccoli (CAN)	Israel Start-Up Nation	+ 4"
7	Óscar Sevilla (ESP)	Team Medellín–EPM	+ 9"
8	Nahom Zerai (ERI)	Eritrea	+ 18"
9	Brayan Sánchez (COL)	Team Medellín–EPM	+ 20"
10	Carlos Quintero (COL)	Terengganu Cycling Team	+ 20"

=== Stage 6 ===
7 May 2021 — Kigali (Rond Point KBC) to Kigali (Mont Kigali), 152.6 km (94.8 mi)

Stage 6 Result
Rank	Rider	Team	Time
1	Pierre Rolland (FRA)	B&B Hotels p/b KTM	3h 46' 03"
2	Alexis Vuillermoz (FRA)	Total Direct Énergie	+ 50"
3	Adne van Engelen (NED)	Bike Aid	+ 2' 36"
4	Lennert Teugels (BEL)	Tarteletto–Isorex	+ 2' 45"
5	Cristián Rodríguez (ESP)	Total Direct Énergie	+ 3' 00"
6	James Piccoli (CAN)	Israel Start-Up Nation	+ 3' 05"
7	Alan Boileau (FRA)	B&B Hotels p/b KTM	+ 3' 07"
8	Jhonatan Restrepo (COL)	Androni Giocattoli–Sidermec	+ 3' 11"
9	Quentin Pacher (FRA)	B&B Hotels p/b KTM	+ 3' 31"
10	Nahom Zerai (ERI)	Eritrea	+ 3' 31"

General classification after Stage 6
Rank	Rider	Team	Time
1	Cristián Rodríguez (ESP)	Total Direct Énergie	20h 38' 10"
2	James Piccoli (CAN)	Israel Start-Up Nation	+ 7"
3	Jhonatan Restrepo (COL)	Androni Giocattoli–Sidermec	+ 13"
4	Quentin Pacher (FRA)	B&B Hotels p/b KTM	+ 33"
5	Alan Boileau (FRA)	B&B Hotels p/b KTM	+ 36"
6	Alex Hoehn (USA)	Wildlife Generation Pro Cycling	+ 43"
7	Nahom Zerai (ERI)	Eritrea	+ 47"
8	Óscar Sevilla (ESP)	Team Medellín–EPM	+ 51"
9	Carlos Quintero (COL)	Terengganu Cycling Team	+ 56"
10	Alexis Vuillermoz (FRA)	Total Direct Énergie	+ 1' 00"

=== Stage 7 ===
8 May 2021 — Kigali (Nyamirambo) to Kigali (Mur de Kigali), 4.5 km (2.8 mi) (ITT)

Stage 7 Result
Rank	Rider	Team	Time
1	Jhonatan Restrepo (COL)	Androni Giocattoli–Sidermec	6' 27"
2	Alex Hoehn (USA)	Wildlife Generation Pro Cycling	+ 1"
3	Alan Boileau (FRA)	B&B Hotels p/b KTM	+ 2"
4	Alexandre Geniez (FRA)	Total Direct Énergie	+ 5"
5	James Piccoli (CAN)	Israel Start-Up Nation	+ 6"
6	Cristián Rodríguez (ESP)	Total Direct Énergie	+ 8"
7	Alexis Vuillermoz (FRA)	Total Direct Énergie	+ 10"
8	Quentin Pacher (FRA)	B&B Hotels p/b KTM	+ 11"
9	Carlos Quintero (COL)	Terengganu Cycling Team	+ 12"
10	Jonathan Hivert (FRA)	B&B Hotels p/b KTM	+ 12"

General classification after Stage 7
Rank	Rider	Team	Time
1	Cristián Rodríguez (ESP)	Total Direct Énergie	20h 44' 45"
2	Jhonatan Restrepo (COL)	Androni Giocattoli–Sidermec	+ 5"
3	James Piccoli (CAN)	Israel Start-Up Nation	+ 5"
4	Alan Boileau (FRA)	B&B Hotels p/b KTM	+ 30"
5	Alex Hoehn (USA)	Wildlife Generation Pro Cycling	+ 36"
6	Quentin Pacher (FRA)	B&B Hotels p/b KTM	+ 36"
7	Óscar Sevilla (ESP)	Team Medellín–EPM	+ 56"
8	Carlos Quintero (COL)	Terengganu Cycling Team	+ 1' 00"
9	Alexis Vuillermoz (FRA)	Total Direct Énergie	+ 1' 02"
10	Nahom Zerai (ERI)	Eritrea	+ 1' 23"

=== Stage 8 ===
9 May 2021 — Kigali (Canal Olympia) to Kigali (Canal Olympia), 75.3 km (46.8 mi)

Stage 8 Result
Rank	Rider	Team	Time
1	Cristián Rodríguez (ESP)	Total Direct Énergie	2h 05' 06"
2	James Piccoli (CAN)	Israel Start-Up Nation	+ 12"
3	Nahom Zerai (ERI)	Eritrea	+ 14"
4	Alex Hoehn (USA)	Wildlife Generation Pro Cycling	+ 14"
5	Alexis Vuillermoz (FRA)	Total Direct Énergie	+ 21"
6	Alan Boileau (FRA)	B&B Hotels p/b KTM	+ 21"
7	Óscar Sevilla (ESP)	Team Medellín–EPM	+ 29"
8	Quentin Pacher (FRA)	B&B Hotels p/b KTM	+ 29"
9	Charles Kagimu (UGA)	Bike Aid	+ 44"
10	Jhonatan Restrepo (COL)	Androni Giocattoli–Sidermec	+ 46"

General classification after Stage 8
Rank	Rider	Team	Time
1	Cristián Rodríguez (ESP)	Total Direct Énergie	22h 49' 51"
2	James Piccoli (CAN)	Israel Start-Up Nation	+ 17"
3	Alex Hoehn (USA)	Wildlife Generation Pro Cycling	+ 50"
4	Alan Boileau (FRA)	B&B Hotels p/b KTM	+ 51"
5	Jhonatan Restrepo (COL)	Androni Giocattoli–Sidermec	+ 51"
6	Quentin Pacher (FRA)	B&B Hotels p/b KTM	+ 1' 05"
7	Alexis Vuillermoz (FRA)	Total Direct Énergie	+ 1' 23"
8	Óscar Sevilla (ESP)	Team Medellín–EPM	+ 1' 25"
9	Nahom Zerai (ERI)	Eritrea	+ 1' 37"
10	Kent Main (RSA)	ProTouch	+ 2' 44"

== Classification leadership table ==
Classification leadership by stage
Stage	Winner	General classification	Mountains classification	African rider classification	Rwandan rider classification	Young rider classification	Sprints classification	Team classification
1	Brayan Sánchez	Brayan Sánchez	Nur Aiman Mohd Zariff	Gustav Basson	Seth Hakizimana	Santiago Umba	Bernardo Suaza	Androni Giocattoli–Sidermec
2	Alan Boileau	Santiago Umba	Eric Manizabayo	Salim Kipkemboi	Renus Byiza Uhiriwe	Santiago Umba	Lennert Teugels	Androni Giocattoli–Sidermec
3	Alan Boileau	Brayan Sánchez	Lennert Teugels	Metkel Eyob	Eric Muhoza	Nahom Zerai	Lennert Teugels	B&B Hotels p/b KTM
4	Valentin Ferron	Brayan Sánchez	Lennert Teugels	Metkel Eyob	Eric Muhoza	Nahom Zerai	Lennert Teugels	B&B Hotels p/b KTM
5	Alan Boileau	Metkel Eyob	Lennert Teugels	Metkel Eyob	Eric Muhoza	Nahom Zerai	Lennert Teugels	B&B Hotels p/b KTM
6	Pierre Rolland	Cristián Rodríguez	Lennert Teugels	Nahom Zerai	Eric Muhoza	Alan Boileau	Lennert Teugels	B&B Hotels p/b KTM
7	Jhonatan Restrepo	Cristián Rodríguez	Lennert Teugels	Nahom Zerai	Eric Muhoza	Alan Boileau	Lennert Teugels	B&B Hotels p/b KTM
8	Cristián Rodríguez	Cristián Rodríguez	Lennert Teugels	Nahom Zerai	Eric Muhoza	Alan Boileau	Lennert Teugels	B&B Hotels p/b KTM
Final		Cristián Rodríguez	Lennert Teugels	Nahom Zerai	Eric Muhoza	Alan Boileau	Lennert Teugels	B&B Hotels p/b KTM

- On stage 3, Valentin Ferron, who was third in the young rider classification, wore the light blue jersey, because first placed Santiago Umba wore the yellow jersey as the leader of the general classification, and second placed Salim Kipkemboi wore the green jersey as the leader of the African rider classification.
- On stage 4, Bernardo Suaza, who was second in the sprints classification, wore the dark blue jersey, because first placed Lennert Teugels wore the orange jersey as the leader of the mountains classification. For the same reason, Tomas Goytom wore the dark blue jersey on stages 5, 7, and 8, while Andreas Goeman wore the dark blue jersey on stage 6.
- On stage 6, Kent Main, who was third in the African rider classification, wore the green jersey, because first placed Metkel Eyob wore the yellow jersey as the leader of the general classification, and second placed Nahom Zerai wore the light blue jersey as the leader of the young rider classification.

== Final classification standings ==
Legend
Denotes the winner of the general classification	Denotes the winner of the young rider classification
Denotes the winner of the mountains classification	Denotes the winner of the sprints classification
Denotes the winner of the African rider classification	Denotes the winner of the team classification
Denotes the winner of the Rwandan rider classification	

=== General classification ===
Final general classification (1–10)
Rank	Rider	Team	Time
1	Cristián Rodríguez (ESP)	Total Direct Énergie	22h 49' 51"
2	James Piccoli (CAN)	Israel Start-Up Nation	+ 17"
3	Alex Hoehn (USA)	Wildlife Generation Pro Cycling	+ 50"
4	Alan Boileau (FRA)	B&B Hotels p/b KTM	+ 51"
5	Jhonatan Restrepo (COL)	Androni Giocattoli–Sidermec	+ 51"
6	Quentin Pacher (FRA)	B&B Hotels p/b KTM	+ 1' 05"
7	Alexis Vuillermoz (FRA)	Total Direct Énergie	+ 1' 23"
8	Óscar Sevilla (ESP)	Team Medellín–EPM	+ 1' 25"
9	Nahom Zerai (ERI)	Eritrea	+ 1' 37"
10	Kent Main (RSA)	ProTouch	+ 2' 44"

=== Mountains classification ===
Final mountains classification (1–10)
Rank	Rider	Team	Points
1	Lennert Teugels (BEL)	Tarteletto–Isorex	68
2	Eric Manizabayo (RWA)	Benediction Ignite	36
3	Pierre Rolland (FRA)	B&B Hotels p/b KTM	35
4	Bernardo Suaza (COL)	Team Medellín–EPM	31
5	Jonathan Hivert (FRA)	B&B Hotels p/b KTM	22
6	Brayan Sánchez (COL)	Team Medellín–EPM	20
7	Alexis Vuillermoz (FRA)	Total Direct Énergie	20
8	Kent Main (RSA)	ProTouch	20
9	Tomas Goytom (ERI)	Eritrea	19
10	Cristián Rodríguez (ESP)	Total Direct Énergie	16

=== African rider classification ===
Final African rider classification (1–10)
Rank	Rider	Team	Time
1	Nahom Zerai (ERI)	Eritrea	22h 51' 28"
2	Kent Main (RSA)	ProTouch	+ 1' 07"
3	Mehari Tewelde (ERI)	Eritrea	+ 9' 23"
4	Azzedine Lagab (ALG)	Algeria	+ 11' 10"
5	Eric Muhoza (RWA)	Rwanda	+ 12' 14"
6	Eric Manizabayo (RWA)	Benediction Ignite	+ 14' 15"
7	Charles Kagimu (UGA)	Bike Aid	+ 14' 27"
8	Callum Ormiston (RSA)	ProTouch	+ 15' 07"
9	Metkel Eyob (ERI)	Terengganu Cycling Team	+ 16' 21"
10	Salim Kipkemboi (KEN)	Bike Aid	+ 18' 07"

=== Rwandan rider classification ===
Final Rwandan rider classification (1–10)
Rank	Rider	Team	Time
1	Eric Muhoza (RWA)	Rwanda	23h 03' 42"
2	Eric Manizabayo (RWA)	Benediction Ignite	+ 2' 01"
3	Jean Bosco Nsengimana (RWA)	Rwanda	+ 9' 43"
4	Jean Eric Habimana (RWA)	Skol Adrien Cycling Academy	+ 11' 00"
5	Samuel Mugisha (RWA)	Rwanda	+ 12' 08"
6	Shemu Nsengiyumva (RWA)	Skol Adrien Cycling Academy	+ 14' 55"
7	Barnabé Gahemba (RWA)	Rwanda	+ 18' 54"
8	Patrick Byukusenge (RWA)	Benediction Ignite	+ 23' 39"
9	Seth Hakizimana (RWA)	Skol Adrien Cycling Academy	+ 25' 04"
10	Jean Baptiste Nsabimana (RWA)	Skol Adrien Cycling Academy	+ 28' 12"

=== Young rider classification ===
Final young rider classification (1–10)
Rank	Rider	Team	Time
1	Alan Boileau (FRA)	B&B Hotels p/b KTM	22h 50' 42"
2	Nahom Zerai (ERI)	Eritrea	+ 46"
3	Erik Bergström Frisk (SWE)	Bike Aid	+ 3' 41"
4	Santiago Umba (COL)	Androni Giocattoli–Sidermec	+ 4' 01"
5	Mehari Tewelde (ERI)	Eritrea	+ 10' 09"
6	Eric Muhoza (RWA)	Rwanda	+ 13' 00"
7	Valentin Ferron (FRA)	Total Direct Énergie	+ 14' 34"
8	Charles Kagimu (UGA)	Bike Aid	+ 15' 13"
9	Andreas Goeman (BEL)	Tarteletto–Isorex	+ 15' 42"
10	Callum Ormiston (RSA)	ProTouch	+ 15' 53"

=== Sprints classification ===
Final sprints classification (1–10)
Rank	Rider	Team	Points
1	Lennert Teugels (BEL)	Tarteletto–Isorex	27
2	Tomas Goytom (ERI)	Eritrea	12
3	Bernardo Suaza (COL)	Team Medellín–EPM	10
4	Andreas Goeman (BEL)	Tarteletto–Isorex	8
5	Jonathan Hivert (FRA)	B&B Hotels p/b KTM	5
6	Eric Manizabayo (RWA)	Benediction Ignite	5
7	Weimar Roldán (COL)	Team Medellín–EPM	5
8	Pierre Rolland (FRA)	B&B Hotels p/b KTM	4
9	Nikodemus Holler (GER)	Bike Aid	4
10	Kent Main (RSA)	ProTouch	2

=== Team classification ===
Final team classification (1–10)
Rank	Team	Time
1	B&B Hotels p/b KTM	68h 28' 58"
2	Total Direct Énergie	+ 4' 05"
3	Team Medellín–EPM	+ 13' 04"
4	Bike Aid	+ 22' 25"
5	Tarteletto–Isorex	+ 25' 15"
6	Androni Giocattoli–Sidermec	+ 27' 13"
7	Eritrea	+ 36' 02"
8	Wildlife Generation Pro Cycling	+ 49' 39"
9	Rwanda	+ 54' 13"
10	Israel Start-Up Nation	+ 55' 44"
