= Raphaël Parisella =

Canadian road cyclist (born 2002)

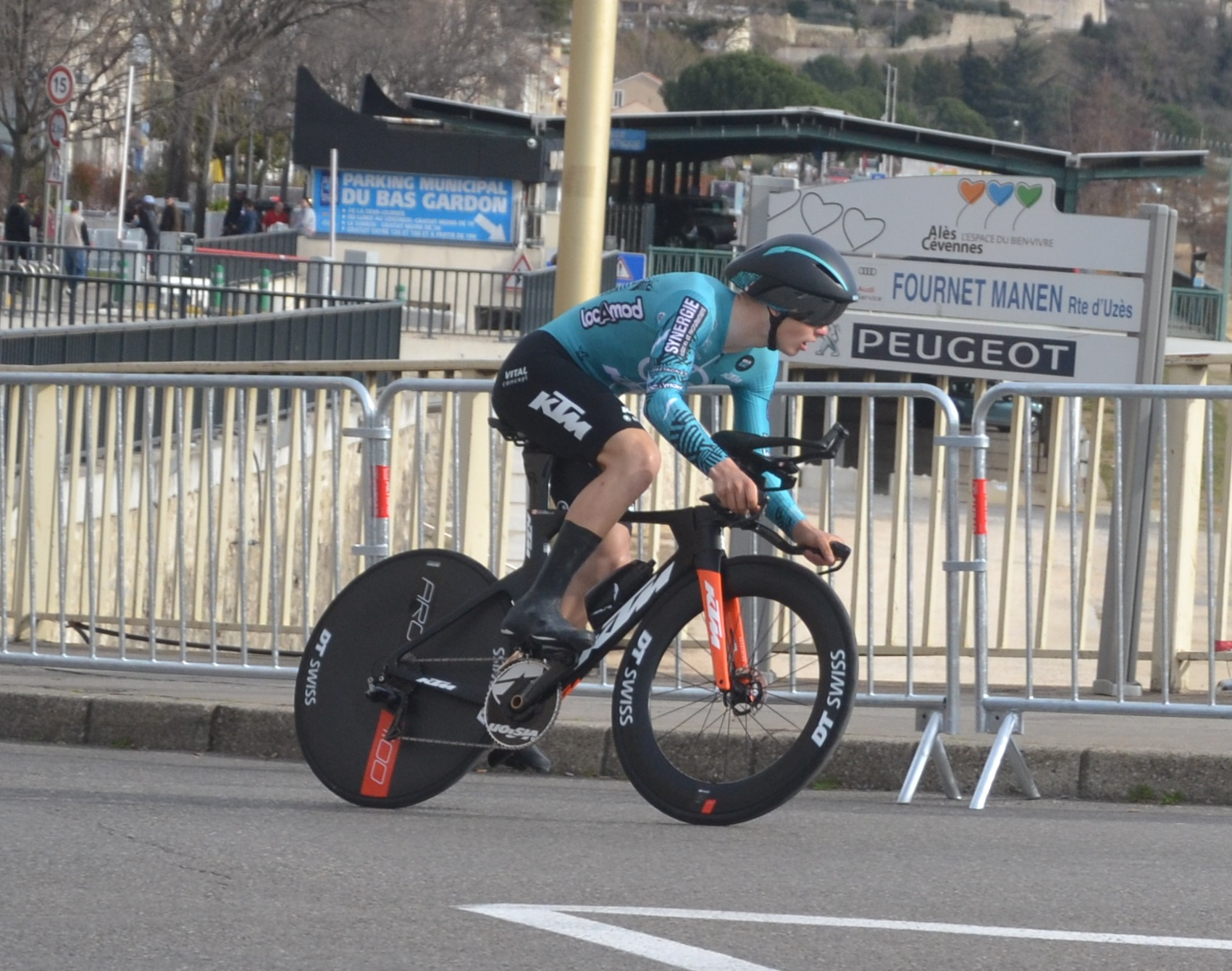
- Parisella at the 2022 Étoile de Bessèges

Personal information
- Born: 23 October 2002 (age 23) Longueuil, Canada
- Height: 1.84 m (6 ft 0 in)
- Weight: 78 kg (172 lb)

Cycling career
- Sport: Cycling
- Current team: Retired
- Discipline: Road
- Role: Rider

Amateur teams
- 2019–2020: Vélo 2000–Rhino Back
- 2021: Les Sables Vendée Cyclisme
- 2023: Dinan Sport Cycling

Professional teams
- 2021: Rally Cycling (stagiaire)
- 2022: B&B Hotels–KTM

Raphaël Parisella (born 23 October 2002) is a Canadian former cyclist, who competed as a professional for UCI ProTeam B&B Hotels–KTM in 2022.

== Major results ==
2019
1st Road race, National Junior Road Championships
