= Alex Hoehn =

American cyclist

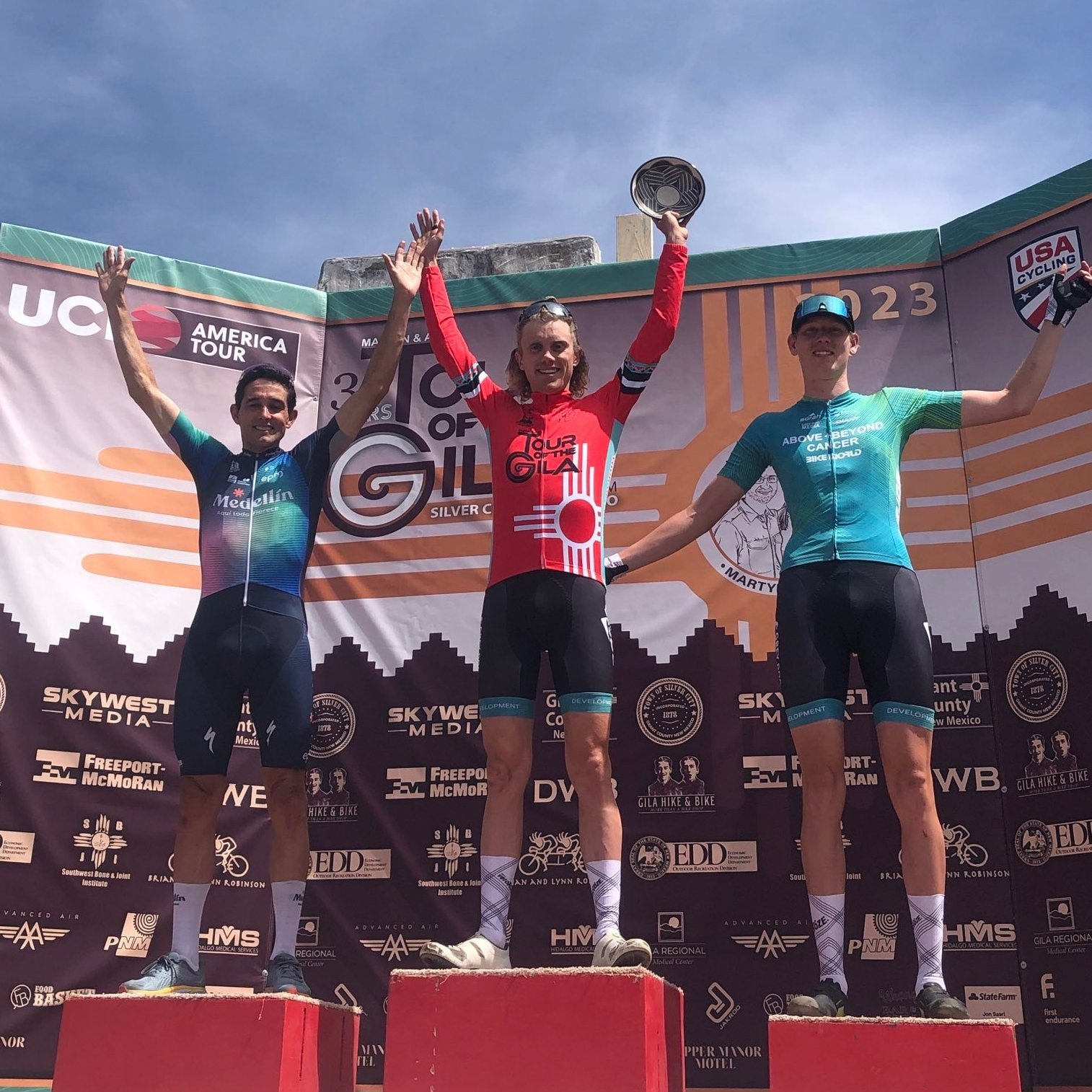
- Alex Hoehn on the podium of the 2023 Tour of the Gila

Personal information
- Full name: Alex James Hoehn
- Born: December 22, 1997 (age 28) Kansas, United States
- Height: 1.8 m (5 ft 11 in)
- Weight: 63 kg (139 lb)

Cycling career
- Sport: Cycling
- Current team: Team Skyline
- Discipline: Road
- Role: Rider
- Rider type: Stage races

Amateur teams
- 2016: Tradewind Energy
- 2022: Drone Hopper–Gsport–Teika
- 2023: Above & Beyond Cancer Cycling p/b Bike World

Professional teams
- 2017: Elevate–KHS Pro Cycling
- 2018–2019: Aevolo
- 2020–2021: Wildlife Generation Pro Cycling
- 2024–: Team Skyline

Alex James Hoehn (born December 22, 1997) is an American racing cyclist, who currently rides for UCI Continental team Team Skyline.

== Career ==
After playing hockey while growing up, Hoehn was introduced to cycling by his father at age 15, and by 18 he had permanently switched to cycling. He joined amateur team Tradewind Energy as a Cat 3, then joined Elevate–KHS Pro Cycling when he reached Cat 1 status.

In July 2018, he won the Under-23 United States National Road Race Championships in Maryland. In May 2019, he led the King of the Mountains classification following the conclusion of stages 3 and 4 of the Tour of California; ultimately finishing 2nd in the classification, as well as 5th in the young rider classification. In April 2023, he finished first overall in the Tour of the Gila.

== Major results ==
2017
4th Overall Chico Stage Race
2018
1st Road race, National Under-23 Road Championships
5th Overall Chico Stage Race

1st Young rider classification

2019
3rd Overall Joe Martin Stage Race

1st Young rider classification

3rd Overall Cascade Cycling Classic

1st Young rider classification

4th Overall Tour of the Gila
2020
10th Malaysian International Classic Race
2021
1st Grand Prix Erciyes - Mimar Sinan
2nd Grand Prix Velo Alanya
3rd Overall Tour du Rwanda
5th Grand Prix Alanya
6th Grand Prix Kayseri
8th Overall Tour of Mevlana
8th Grand Prix Develi
2023
1st Overall Tour of the Gila
8th Overall Redlands Bicycle Classic
10th Belgian Waffle Ride-Arizona
