= 2021 UCI Africa Tour =

- Seventeenth edition of the UCI Africa Tour

Details
- Dates: 18 November 2020 – 10 October 2021
- Location: Africa
- Races: 4

The 2021 UCI Africa Tour was the 17th season of the UCI Africa Tour. The season began on 21 February 2021 with the Tour du Rwanda and ended on 10 October 2021 with the final stage of the Grand Prix Chantal Biya.

The points leader, based on the cumulative results of previous races, wears the UCI Africa Tour cycling jersey.

Throughout the season, points are awarded to the top finishers of stages within stage races and the final general classification standings of each of the stages races and one-day events. The quality and complexity of a race also determines how many points are awarded to the top finishers: the higher the UCI rating of a race, the more points are awarded. The UCI ratings from highest to lowest are as follows:

- Multi-day events: 2.1 and 2.2
- One-day events: 1.1 and 1.2

== Events ==
=== 2020 ===
Races in the 2020 UCI Africa Tour
Race	Rating	Date	Winner	Team
(Cameroon) Grand Prix Chantal Biya	2.2	18–22 November	Moise Mugisha (RWA)	Rwanda (national team)

=== 2021 ===
Races in the 2021 UCI Africa Tour
Race	Rating	Date	Winner	Team
Tour du Rwanda	2.1	2–9 May	Cristián Rodríguez (ESP)	Total Direct Énergie
(Cameroon) Tour du Cameroun	2.2	29 May–6 June	Clovis Kamzong (CMR)	SNH Vélo Club
(Cameroon) Grand Prix Chantal Biya	2.2	6–10 October	Lukáš Kubiš (SVK)	Slovakia (national team)
