= 2019 Tour of California =

Cycling race

2019 UCI World Tour, race 24 of 38
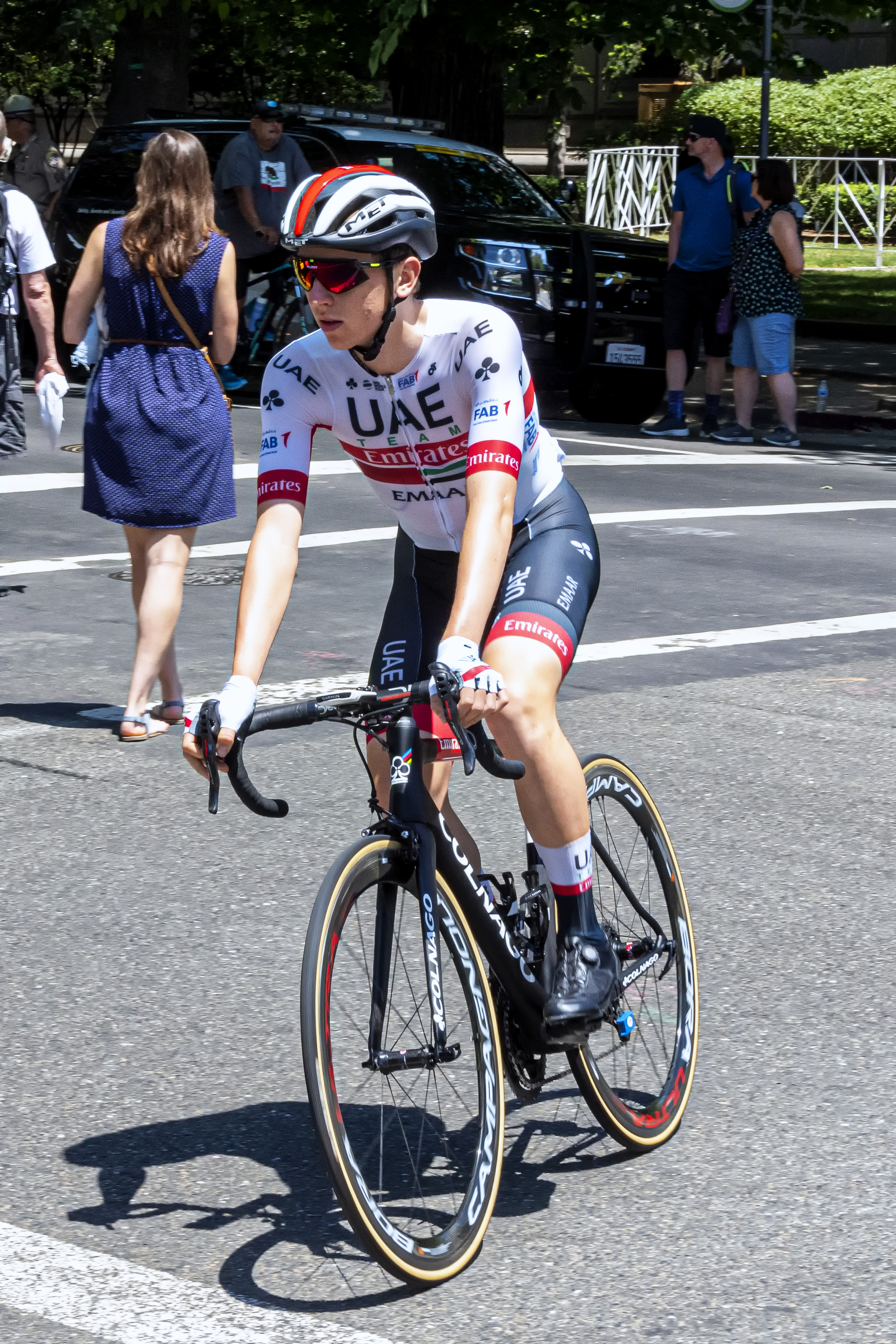
- Tadej Pogačar on Stage 1

Race details
- Dates: 12–18 May 2019
- Stages: 7
- Distance: 1,229 km (764 mi)
- Winning time: 32h 55' 12"

Results
Jersey awarded to the overall winner	Winner	Tadej Pogačar (SLO)	(UAE Team Emirates)
	Second	Sergio Higuita (COL)	(EF Education First)
	Third	Kasper Asgreen (DEN)	(Deceuninck–Quick-Step)
Jersey awarded to the mountains classification winner	Mountains	Davide Ballerini (ITA)	(Astana)
Jersey awarded to the young rider classification winner	Young rider	Tadej Pogačar (SLO)	(UAE Team Emirates)
Jersey awarded to the sprints classification winner	Sprints	Kasper Asgreen (DEN)	(Deceuninck–Quick-Step)
	Team	EF Education First	

The 2019 Tour of California was a road cycling stage race that took place between 12 and 18 May 2019 in the United States. It was the 14th and final edition of the Tour of California and the 24th race of the 2019 UCI World Tour.

== Teams ==
Nineteen teams, each with seven riders except for Bahrain–Merida with six, participated in the race. 112 of the 132 riders finished.

UCI WorldTeams

- Astana
- Bahrain–Merida
- Bora–Hansgrohe
- CCC Team
- Deceuninck–Quick-Step
- EF Education First
- Team Dimension Data
- Team INEOS
- Team Jumbo–Visma
- Team Katusha–Alpecin
- Team Sunweb
- UAE Team Emirates

UCI Professional Continental teams

- Cofidis
- Hagens Berman Axeon
- Israel Cycling Academy
- Rally UHC Cycling
- Team Novo Nordisk

National teams

- United States

== Route ==
Stage characteristics and winners
Stage	Date	Course	Distance	Type	Stage winner
1	May 12	Sacramento to Sacramento	143 km (89 mi)	Flat stage	Peter Sagan (SVK)
2	May 13	Rancho Cordova to South Lake Tahoe	194.5 km (120.9 mi)	Medium mountain stage	Kasper Asgreen (DEN)
3	May 14	Stockton to Morgan Hill	207 km (129 mi)	Hilly stage	Rémi Cavagna (FRA)
4	May 15	WeatherTech Raceway Laguna Seca to Morro Bay	212.5 km (132.0 mi)	Flat stage	Fabio Jakobsen (NED)
5	May 16	Pismo Beach to Ventura	218.5 km (135.8 mi)	Flat stage	Iván García Cortina (ESP)
6	May 17	Ontario to Mount Baldy	127.5 km (79.2 mi)	Mountain stage	Tadej Pogačar (SLO)
7	May 18	Santa Clarita to Pasadena	126 km (78 mi)	Hilly stage	Cees Bol (NED)
Total		1,229 km (764 mi)			

== Stages ==
=== Stage 1 ===
12 May 2019 — Sacramento to Sacramento, 143 km (89 mi)

Result of Stage 1
Rank	Rider	Team	Time
1	Peter Sagan (SVK)	Bora–Hansgrohe	3h 14' 10"
2	Travis McCabe (USA)	United States	+ 0"
3	Max Walscheid (GER)	Team Sunweb	+ 0"
4	Kristoffer Halvorsen (NOR)	Team INEOS	+ 0"
5	Michael Mørkøv (DEN)	Deceuninck–Quick-Step	+ 0"
6	Owain Doull (GBR)	Team INEOS	+ 0"
7	John Degenkolb (GER)	Trek–Segafredo	+ 4"
8	Phil Bauhaus (GER)	Bahrain–Merida	+ 4"
9	Erik Baška (SVK)	Bora–Hansgrohe	+ 4"
10	Jasper Philipsen (BEL)	UAE Team Emirates	+ 4"

General classification after Stage 1
Rank	Rider	Team	Time
1	Peter Sagan (SVK)	Bora–Hansgrohe	3h 14' 00"
2	Travis McCabe (USA)	United States	+ 4"
3	Max Walscheid (GER)	Team Sunweb	+ 6"
4	Kristoffer Halvorsen (NOR)	Team INEOS	+ 10"
5	Michael Mørkøv (DEN)	Deceuninck–Quick-Step	+ 10"
6	Owain Doull (GBR)	Team INEOS	+ 10"
7	Tyler Stites (USA)	United States	+ 11"
8	Felix Großschartner (AUT)	Bora–Hansgrohe	+ 12"
9	George Bennett (NZL)	Team Jumbo–Visma	+ 13"
10	Laurens De Vreese (BEL)	Astana	+ 13"

=== Stage 2 ===
13 May 2019 — Rancho Cordova to South Lake Tahoe, 194.5 km (120.9 mi)

Result of Stage 2
Rank	Rider	Team	Time
1	Kasper Asgreen (DEN)	Deceuninck–Quick-Step	6h 17' 11"
2	Tejay van Garderen (USA)	EF Education First	+ 0"
3	Gianni Moscon (ITA)	Team INEOS	+ 4"
4	Tadej Pogačar (SLO)	UAE Team Emirates	+ 10"
5	Maximilian Schachmann (GER)	Bora–Hansgrohe	+ 16"
6	Jonas Gregaard (DEN)	Astana	+ 27"
7	Rob Britton (CAN)	Rally UHC Cycling	+ 27"
8	Sergio Higuita (COL)	EF Education First	+ 31"
9	Rigoberto Urán (COL)	EF Education First	+ 31"
10	George Bennett (NZL)	Team Jumbo–Visma	+ 31"

General classification after Stage 2
Rank	Rider	Team	Time
1	Tejay van Garderen (USA)	EF Education First	9h 31' 19"
2	Gianni Moscon (ITA)	Team INEOS	+ 6"
3	Kasper Asgreen (DEN)	Deceuninck–Quick-Step	+ 7"
4	Tadej Pogačar (SLO)	UAE Team Emirates	+ 16"
5	Maximilian Schachmann (GER)	Bora–Hansgrohe	+ 22"
6	Rob Britton (CAN)	Rally UHC Cycling	+ 33"
7	Jonas Gregaard (DEN)	Astana	+ 33"
8	David De La Cruz (ESP)	Team INEOS	+ 34"
9	Felix Großschartner (AUT)	Bora–Hansgrohe	+ 35"
10	George Bennett (NZL)	Team Jumbo–Visma	+ 36"

=== Stage 3 ===
14 May 2019 — Stockton to Morgan Hill, 207 km (129 mi)

Result of Stage 3
Rank	Rider	Team	Time
1	Rémi Cavagna (FRA)	Deceuninck–Quick-Step	5h 44' 22"
2	Ben King (USA)	Team Dimension Data	+ 7' 11"
3	Simon Geschke (GER)	CCC Team	+ 7' 11"
4	Kasper Asgreen (DEN)	Deceuninck–Quick-Step	+ 7' 47"
5	Jasper Philipsen (BEL)	UAE Team Emirates	+ 7' 47"
6	Maximilian Schachmann (GER)	Bora–Hansgrohe	+ 7' 47"
7	Nathan Haas (AUS)	Team Katusha–Alpecin	+ 7' 47"
8	Davide Ballerini (ITA)	Astana	+ 7' 47"
9	Zdeněk Štybar (CZE)	Deceuninck–Quick-Step	+ 7' 47"
10	Tadej Pogačar (SLO)	UAE Team Emirates	+ 7' 47"

General classification after Stage 3
Rank	Rider	Team	Time
1	Tejay van Garderen (USA)	EF Education First	15h 23' 28"
2	Gianni Moscon (ITA)	Team INEOS	+ 6"
3	Kasper Asgreen (DEN)	Deceuninck–Quick-Step	+ 7"
4	Tadej Pogačar (SLO)	UAE Team Emirates	+ 16"
5	Maximilian Schachmann (GER)	Bora–Hansgrohe	+ 22"
6	Rob Britton (CAN)	Rally UHC Cycling	+ 33"
7	Jonas Gregaard (DEN)	Astana	+ 33"
8	David De La Cruz (ESP)	Team INEOS	+ 34"
9	Felix Großschartner (AUT)	Bora–Hansgrohe	+ 35"
10	George Bennett (NZL)	Team Jumbo–Visma	+ 36"

=== Stage 4 ===
15 May 2019 — WeatherTech Raceway Laguna Seca to Morro Bay, 212.5 km (132.0 mi)

Result of Stage 4
Rank	Rider	Team	Time
1	Fabio Jakobsen (NED)	Deceuninck–Quick-Step	5h 53' 22"
2	Jasper Philipsen (BEL)	UAE Team Emirates	+ 0"
3	Peter Sagan (SVK)	Bora–Hansgrohe	+ 0"
4	Nacer Bouhanni (FRA)	Cofidis	+ 0"
5	Reinardt Janse Van Rensburg (SAF)	Team Dimension Data	+ 0"
6	Davide Ballerini (ITA)	Astana	+ 0"
7	Phil Bauhaus (GER)	Bahrain–Merida	+ 0"
8	Kristoffer Halvorsen (NOR)	Team INEOS	+ 0"
9	Danny van Poppel (NED)	Team Jumbo–Visma	+ 0"
10	Kasper Asgreen (DEN)	Deceuninck–Quick-Step	+ 0"

General classification after Stage 4
Rank	Rider	Team	Time
1	Tejay van Garderen (USA)	EF Education First	21h 16' 50"
2	Gianni Moscon (ITA)	Team INEOS	+ 6"
3	Kasper Asgreen (DEN)	Deceuninck–Quick-Step	+ 7"
4	Tadej Pogačar (SLO)	UAE Team Emirates	+ 16"
5	Maximilian Schachmann (GER)	Bora–Hansgrohe	+ 22"
6	Rob Britton (CAN)	Rally UHC Cycling	+ 33"
7	Jonas Gregaard (DEN)	Astana	+ 33"
8	David De La Cruz (ESP)	Team INEOS	+ 34"
9	Felix Großschartner (AUT)	Bora–Hansgrohe	+ 35"
10	George Bennett (NZL)	Team Jumbo–Visma	+ 36"

=== Stage 5 ===
16 May 2019 — Pismo Beach to Ventura, 218.5 km (135.8 mi)

Result of Stage 5
Rank	Rider	Team	Time
1	Iván García Cortina (ESP)	Bahrain–Merida	4h 56' 11"
2	Maximiliano Richeze (ARG)	Deceuninck–Quick-Step	+ 0"
3	Sergio Higuita (COL)	EF Education First	+ 0"
4	Joris Nieuwenhuis (NED)	Team Sunweb	+ 0"
5	Kasper Asgreen (DEN)	Deceuninck–Quick-Step	+ 0"
6	Maximilian Schachmann (GER)	Bora–Hansgrohe	+ 0"
7	Paweł Bernas (POL)	CCC Team	+ 0"
8	Nacer Bouhanni (FRA)	Cofidis	+ 0"
9	Tadej Pogačar (SLO)	UAE Team Emirates	+ 0"
10	Hugo Houle (CAN)	Astana	+ 0"

General classification after Stage 5
Rank	Rider	Team	Time
1	Tejay van Garderen (USA)	EF Education First	26h 13' 01"
2	Kasper Asgreen (DEN)	Deceuninck–Quick-Step	+ 4"
3	Gianni Moscon (ITA)	Team INEOS	+ 6"
4	Tadej Pogačar (SLO)	UAE Team Emirates	+ 16"
5	Maximilian Schachmann (GER)	Bora–Hansgrohe	+ 22"
6	Sergio Higuita (COL)	EF Education First	+ 28"
7	Jonas Gregaard (DEN)	Astana	+ 33"
8	George Bennett (NZL)	Team Jumbo–Visma	+ 34"
9	Felix Großschartner (AUT)	Bora–Hansgrohe	+ 35"
10	Rigoberto Urán (COL)	EF Education First	+ 36"

=== Stage 6 ===
17 May 2019 — Ontario to Mount Baldy, 127.5 km (79.2 mi)

Result of Stage 6
Rank	Rider	Team	Time
1	Tadej Pogačar (SLO)	UAE Team Emirates	3h 48' 49"
2	Sergio Higuita (COL)	EF Education First	+ 0"
3	George Bennett (NZL)	Team Jumbo–Visma	+ 5"
4	Richie Porte (AUS)	Trek–Segafredo	+ 10"
5	Riccardo Zoidl (AUT)	CCC Team	+ 20"
6	Kasper Asgreen (DEN)	Deceuninck–Quick-Step	+ 22"
7	Simon Špilak (SLO)	Team Katusha–Alpecin	+ 25"
8	Rohan Dennis (AUS)	Bahrain–Merida	+ 47"
9	Rob Britton (CAN)	Rally UHC Cycling	+ 47"
10	Jesper Hansen (DEN)	Cofidis	+ 47"

General classification after Stage 6
Rank	Rider	Team	Time
1	Tadej Pogačar (SLO)	UAE Team Emirates	30h 01' 56"
2	Sergio Higuita (COL)	EF Education First	+ 16"
3	Kasper Asgreen (DEN)	Deceuninck–Quick-Step	+ 20"
4	George Bennett (NZL)	Team Jumbo–Visma	+ 29"
5	Richie Porte (AUS)	Trek–Segafredo	+ 41"
6	Simon Špilak (SLO)	CCC Team	+ 1' 03"
7	Jesper Hansen (DEN)	Cofidis	+ 1' 18"
8	Felix Großschartner (AUT)	Bora–Hansgrohe	+ 1' 18"
9	Tejay van Garderen (USA)	EF Education First	+ 1' 22"
10	Rohan Dennis (AUS)	Bahrain–Merida	+ 1' 23"

=== Stage 7 ===
18 May 2019 — Santa Clarita to Pasadena, 126 km (78 mi)

Result of Stage 7
Rank	Rider	Team	Time
1	Cees Bol (NED)	Team Sunweb	2h 53' 16"
2	Peter Sagan (SVK)	Bora–Hansgrohe	+ 0"
3	Jasper Philipsen (BEL)	UAE Team Emirates	+ 0"
4	Phil Bauhaus (GER)	Bahrain–Merida	+ 0"
5	Maximiliano Richeze (ARG)	Deceuninck–Quick-Step	+ 0"
6	Kristoffer Halvorsen (NOR)	Team INEOS	+ 0"
7	Travis McCabe (USA)	United States	+ 0"
8	Andrea Peron (ITA)	Team Novo Nordisk	+ 0"
9	Jens Debusschere (BEL)	Team Katusha–Alpecin	+ 0"
10	Edwin Ávila (COL)	Israel Cycling Academy	+ 0"

General classification after Stage 7
Rank	Rider	Team	Time
1	Tadej Pogačar (SLO)	UAE Team Emirates	32h 55' 12"
2	Sergio Higuita (COL)	EF Education First	+ 16"
3	Kasper Asgreen (DEN)	Deceuninck–Quick-Step	+ 17"
4	George Bennett (NZL)	Team Jumbo–Visma	+ 29"
5	Richie Porte (AUS)	Trek–Segafredo	+ 41"
6	Simon Špilak (SLO)	CCC Team	+ 1' 03"
7	Jesper Hansen (DEN)	Cofidis	+ 1' 18"
8	Felix Großschartner (AUT)	Bora–Hansgrohe	+ 1' 18"
9	Tejay van Garderen (USA)	EF Education First	+ 1' 22"
10	Maximilian Schachmann (GER)	Bora–Hansgrohe	+ 1' 23"

== Classification leadership table ==
Stage	Winner	General classification	Sprints classification	Mountains classification	Young rider classification	Most courageous rider	Team classification
1	Peter Sagan	Peter Sagan	Peter Sagan	Not awarded	Tyler Stites	Charles Planet	Team INEOS
2	Kasper Asgreen	Tejay van Garderen	Kasper Asgreen	Davide Ballerini	Tadej Pogačar	Evan Huffman	EF Education First
3	Rémi Cavagna	Tejay van Garderen	Kasper Asgreen	Alex Hoehn	Tadej Pogačar	Rémi Cavagna	EF Education First
4	Fabio Jakobsen	Tejay van Garderen	Peter Sagan	Alex Hoehn	Tadej Pogačar	Michael Hernandez	EF Education First
5	Iván García Cortina	Tejay van Garderen	Kasper Asgreen	Davide Ballerini	Tadej Pogačar	Matteo Badilatti	EF Education First
6	Tadej Pogačar	Tadej Pogačar	Kasper Asgreen	Davide Ballerini	Tadej Pogačar	Mikkel Bjerg	EF Education First
7	Cees Bol	Tadej Pogačar	Kasper Asgreen	Davide Ballerini	Tadej Pogačar	Alex Hoehn	EF Education First
Final		Tadej Pogačar	Kasper Asgreen	Davide Ballerini	Tadej Pogačar	not awarded	EF Education First

== Final classification standings ==
Legend
Denotes the winner of the general classification	Denotes the winner of the mountains classification
Denotes the winner of the points classification	Denotes the winner of the young rider classification

=== General classification ===
Final general classification (1–10)
Rank	Rider	Team	Time
1	Tadej Pogačar (SLO)	UAE Team Emirates	32h 55' 12"
2	Sergio Higuita (COL)	EF Education First	+ 16"
3	Kasper Asgreen (DEN)	Deceuninck–Quick-Step	+ 17"
4	George Bennett (NZL)	Team Jumbo–Visma	+ 29"
5	Richie Porte (AUS)	Trek–Segafredo	+ 41"
6	Simon Špilak (SLO)	CCC Team	+ 1' 03"
7	Jesper Hansen (DEN)	Cofidis	+ 1' 18"
8	Felix Großschartner (AUT)	Bora–Hansgrohe	+ 1' 18"
9	Tejay van Garderen (USA)	EF Education First	+ 1' 22"
10	Maximilian Schachmann (GER)	Bora–Hansgrohe	+ 1' 23"

=== Points classification ===
Final points classification (1–10)
Rank	Rider	Team	Points
1	Kasper Asgreen (DEN)	Deceuninck–Quick-Step	40
2	Peter Sagan (SVK)	Bora–Hansgrohe	36
3	Sergio Higuita (COL)	EF Education First	29
4	Jasper Philipsen (BEL)	UAE Team Emirates	28
5	Tadej Pogačar (SLO)	UAE Team Emirates	25
6	Rémi Cavagna (FRA)	Deceuninck–Quick-Step	22
7	Maximilian Schachmann (GER)	Bora–Hansgrohe	21
8	Maximiliano Richeze (ARG)	Deceuninck–Quick-Step	20
9	Fabio Jakobsen (NED)	Deceuninck–Quick-Step	18
10	Travis McCabe (USA)	United States	16

=== Mountains classification ===
Final mountains classification (1–10)
Rank	Rider	Team	Points
1	Davide Ballerini (ITA)	Astana	51
2	Alex Hoehn (USA)	United States	35
3	Rémi Cavagna (FRA)	Deceuninck–Quick-Step	31
4	Sergio Higuita (COL)	EF Education First	20
5	Tadej Pogačar (SLO)	UAE Team Emirates	15
6	Kasper Asgreen (DEN)	Deceuninck–Quick-Step	14
7	Michael Hernandez (USA)	United States	13
8	Lachlan Morton (AUS)	EF Education First	13
9	Paweł Bernas (POL)	CCC Team	12
10	Hugo Houle (CAN)	Astana	11

=== Young rider classification ===
Final young rider classification (1–10)
Rank	Rider	Team	Time
1	Tadej Pogačar (SLO)	UAE Team Emirates	32h 55' 12"
2	Sergio Higuita (COL)	EF Education First	+ 16"
3	João Almeida (POR)	Hagens Berman Axeon	+ 12' 33"
4	Edward Anderson (USA)	Hagens Berman Axeon	+ 29' 19"
5	Alex Hoehn (USA)	United States	+ 39' 09"
6	Mikkel Bjerg (DEN)	Hagens Berman Axeon	+ 44' 00"
7	Jasper Philipsen (BEL)	UAE Team Emirates	+ 44' 58"
8	Michael Storer (AUS)	Team Sunweb	+ 1h 08' 38"
9	Szymon Sajnok (POL)	CCC Team	+ 1h 11' 48"
10	Michael Hernandez (USA)	United States	+ 1h 31' 04"

=== Teams classification ===
Final teams classification (1–10)
Rank	Team	Time
1	EF Education First	98h 49' 34"
2	Cofidis	+ 2' 35"
3	Rally UHC Cycling	+ 4' 11"
4	Astana	+ 4' 28"
5	UAE Team Emirates	+ 13' 01"
6	Trek–Segafredo	+ 17' 07"
7	CCC Team	+ 21' 15"
8	Team Jumbo–Visma	+ 25' 57"
9	Team Katusha–Alpecin	+ 30' 07"
10	Deceuninck–Quick-Step	+ 32' 50"
