= Marlon Gaillard =

French bicycle racer

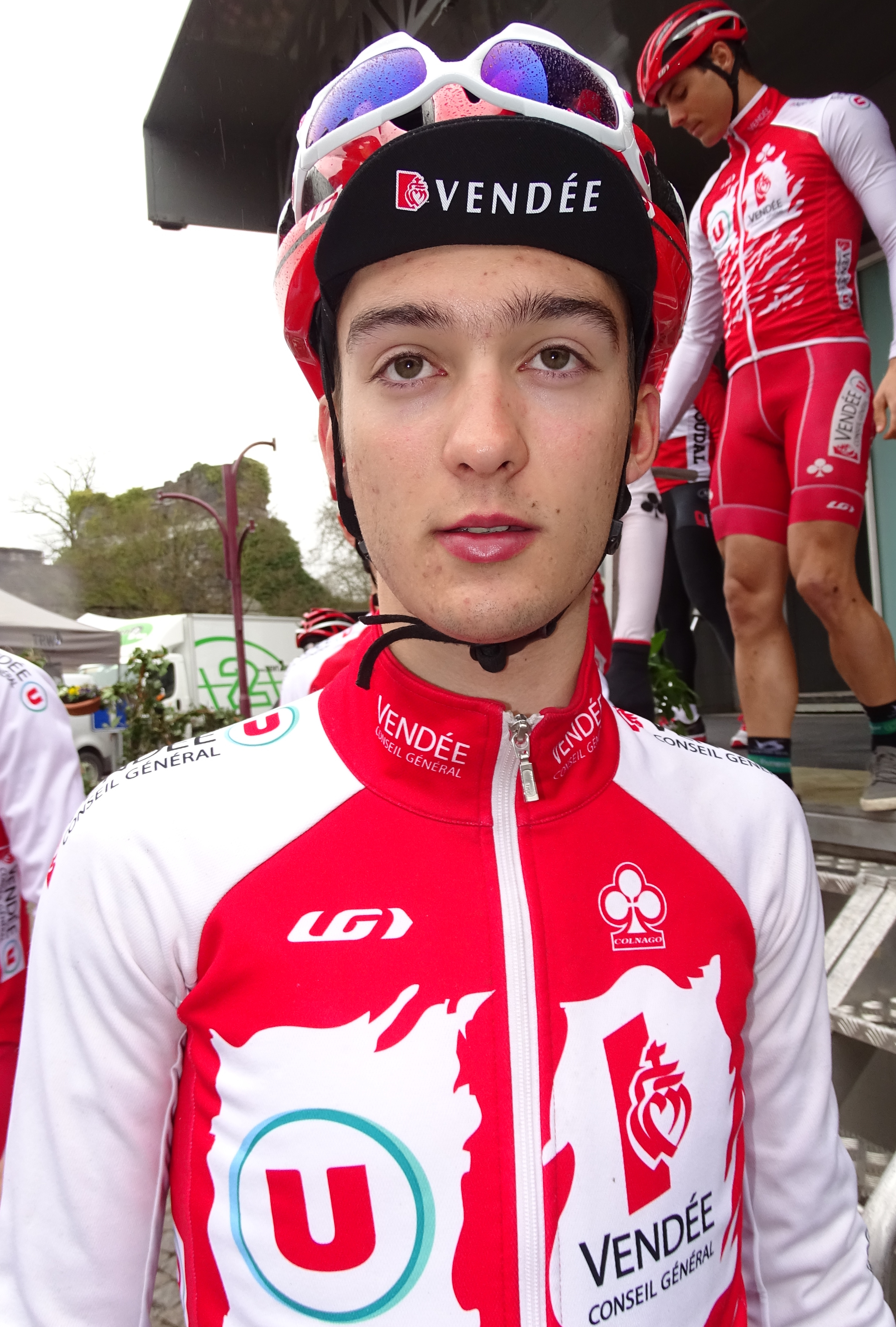
- Gaillard in 2015.

Personal information
- Born: 9 May 1996 (age 30) Chinon, France
- Height: 1.77 m (5 ft 10 in)
- Weight: 64 kg (141 lb)

Cycling career
- Sport: Cycling
- Current team: Retired
- Discipline: Road
- Role: Rider

Amateur teams
- 2015–2019: Vendée U
- 2016: Direct Énergie (stagiaire)
- 2018: Direct Énergie (stagiaire)

Professional team
- 2020–2021: Total Direct Énergie

Marlon Gaillard (born 9 May 1996 in Chinon) is a French former cyclist, who competed as a professional from 2020 to 2021 for UCI ProTeam Total Direct Énergie.

== Major results ==
2016
8th Overall Tour de Gironde
2018
4th Overall Ronde de l'Isard
4th Overall Tour du Maroc

1st Young rider classification

6th Paris–Mantes-en-Yvelines
8th Flèche Ardennaise
2019
2nd Overall Ronde de l'Oise

1st Stage 1
