= Maxime Chevalier =

French cyclist

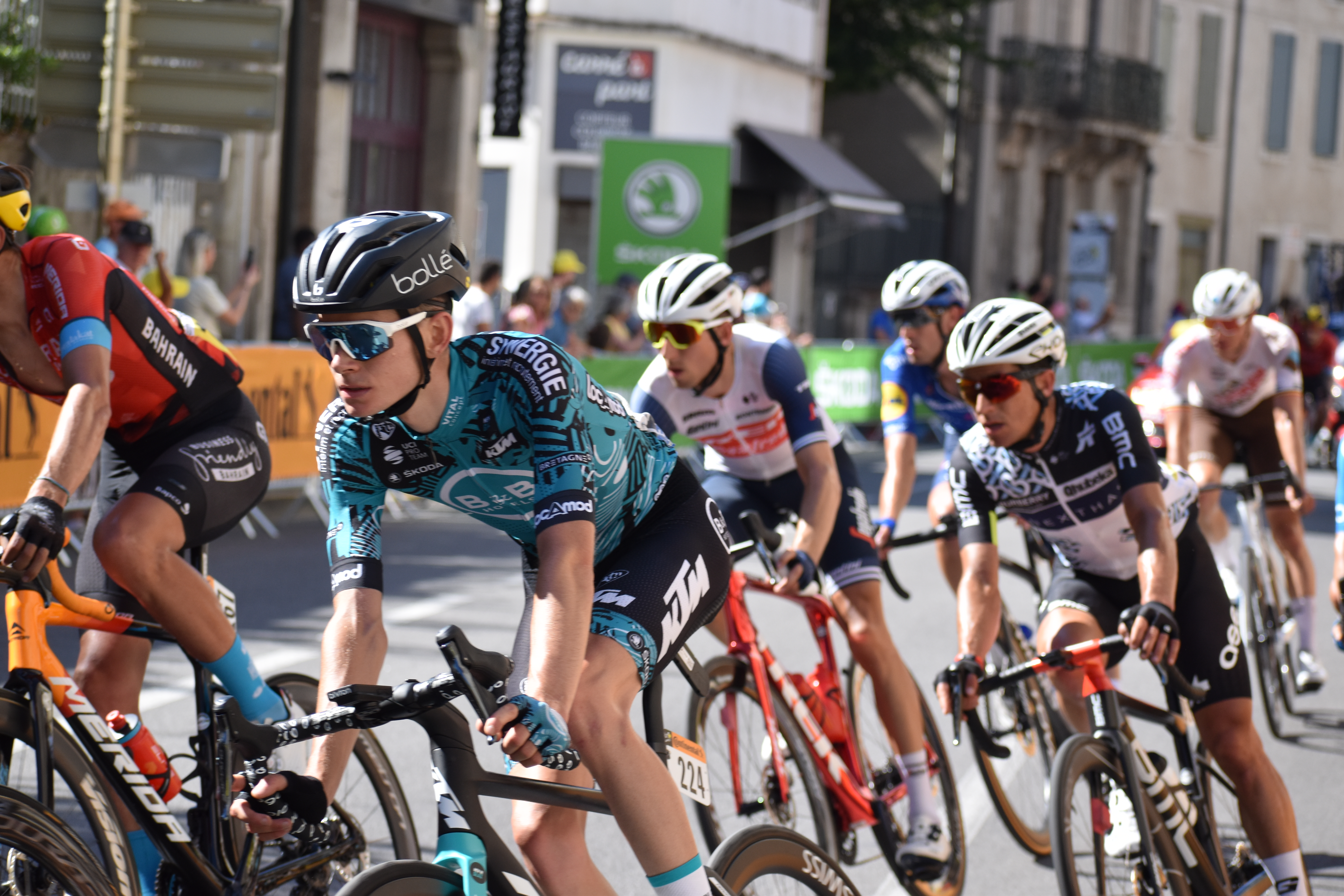
- Chevalier at the 2021 Tour de France

Personal information
- Full name: Maxime Chevalier
- Born: 16 May 1999 (age 27) Saint-Nazaire, France
- Height: 1.78 m (5 ft 10 in)
- Weight: 60 kg (132 lb)

Cycling career
- Sport: Cycling
- Current team: Laval Cyclisme 53
- Discipline: Road
- Role: Rider

Amateur teams
- 2018–2020: V.C. Pays de Loudéac
- 2018: Vital Concept (stagiaire)
- 2019: Vital Concept–B&B Hotels (stagiaire)
- 2023–: Laval Cyclisme 53

Professional team
- 2020–2022: B&B Hotels–Vital Concept

Maxime Chevalier (born 16 May 1999) is a French cyclist, who rode for the French amateur team Laval Cyclisme 53. In August 2020, he was named in the startlist for the 2020 Tour de France.

== Major results ==
2017
10th Kuurne-Brussel-Kuurne Juniors
2019
4th Overall Giro della Valle d'Aosta
4th Paris–Tours Espoirs
8th Overall Tour du Jura
2021
1st Prologue Tour de Savoie Mont-Blanc
7th Trofeo Andratx – Mirador d’Es Colomer
2023
6th Trophée de l'Essor

=== Grand Tour general classification results timeline ===
Grand Tour	2020	2021
Giro d'Italia	—	—
Tour de France	136	93
Vuelta a España	—	—

Legend
—	Did not compete
DNF	Did not finish
