= Salim Kipkemboi =

Kenyan cyclist

Personal information
- Full name: Salim Kipkemboi
- Born: 30 November 1998 (age 27) Kakuma, Kenya

Cycling career
- Sport: Cycling
- Current team: Bike Aid
- Discipline: Road
- Role: Rider
- Rider type: Climber

Professional team
- 2017–: Bike Aid

Salim Kipkemboi (born 30 November 1998) is a Kenyan cyclist, who currently rides for UCI Continental team Bike Aid.

Kipkemboi joined Bike Aid in 2017 and he won stage 3, the queen stage, of the 2018 Sharjah International Cycling Tour for his first career victory. He won the stage in a four-man sprint to the end.

== Major results ==
2017
7th Overall Tour Meles Zenawi
2018
4th Overall Sharjah International Cycling Tour

1st Young rider classification
1st Stage 3

10th Overall La Tropicale Amissa Bongo
