= Alan Boileau =

French cyclist

Personal information
- Born: 25 June 1999 (age 27) Morlaix, France
- Height: 1.71 m (5 ft 7 in)
- Weight: 57 kg (126 lb)

Cycling career
- Sport: Cycling
- Current team: Philippe Wagner–Bazin
- Discipline: Road
- Role: Rider

Amateur teams
- 2017–2019: Pays de Dinan
- 2019: Vital Concept–B&B Hotels (stagiaire)
- 2020: VC Pays de Loudéac
- 2023: VC Rouen 76

Professional teams
- 2021–2022: B&B Hotels p/b KTM
- 2024–: Philippe Wagner–Bazin

Alan Boileau (born 25 June 1999) is a French cyclist, who currently rides for UCI Continental team Philippe Wagner–Bazin.

== Major results ==
2017
6th Grand Prix Bob Jungels
2018
4th Time trial, National Under-23 Road Championships
8th Chrono des Nations U23
2019
9th Overall Orlen Nations Grand Prix

1st Stage 1 (TTT)

2020
4th Overall Ronde de l'Isard
2021
1st Stage 3 Tour de Savoie Mont-Blanc
4th Overall Tour du Rwanda

1st Young rider classification
1st Stages 2, 3 & 5

2022
1st Stage 7 Tour du Rwanda
