= Julien Morice =

French cyclist

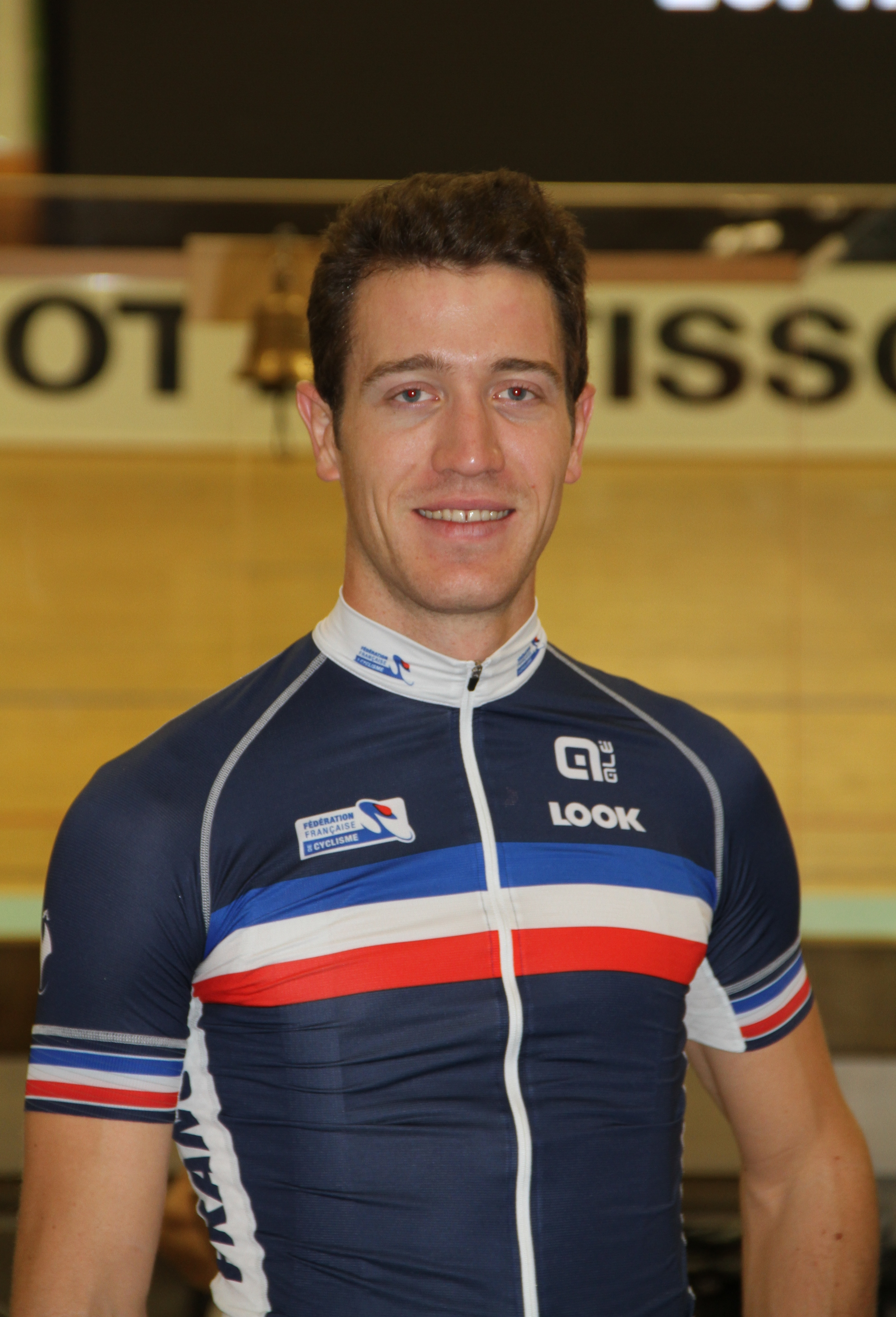
- Morice in 2015.

Personal information
- Full name: Julien Morice
- Born: 20 July 1991 (age 35) Vannes, France
- Height: 1.90 m (6 ft 3 in)
- Weight: 80 kg (176 lb)

Cycling career
- Sport: Cycling
- Current team: Retired
- Disciplines: Road; Track
- Role: Rider
- Rider type: Rouleur

Amateur teams
- 2010–2014: Vendée U
- 2013: Team Europcar (stagiaire)

Professional teams
- 2015–2017: Team Europcar
- 2018–2022: Vital Concept
Medal record
Men's track cycling
Representing France
World Championships
Bronze medal – third place	2015 Yvelines	Pursuit

Julien Morice (born 20 July 1991) is a French former professional racing cyclist, who competed as a professional from 2015 to 2022.

He rode at the 2015 UCI Track Cycling World Championships, where he took a bronze medal in the individual pursuit. He was named in the startlist for the 2016 Vuelta a España.

== Major results ==
2014
7th Overall Paris–Arras Tour
2018
1st Stage 1 (ITT) Sharjah Tour

=== Grand Tour general classification results timeline ===
Grand Tour	2016
Giro d'Italia	—
Tour de France	—
Vuelta a España	150

Legend
—	Did not compete
DNF	Did not finish
