= Eritrean National Cycling Team =

Eritrean National Cycling Team or ENCT (Tigrinya ሃገራዊት ጋንታ ብሽክለታ ኤርትራ) is the national cycling team represented Eritrea in Continental and International Cycling races. ENCT is a member of the African Cycling Confederation and the Union Cycliste Internationale

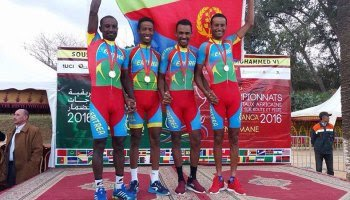
Eritrean National Cycling Team on stage 2016, Egypt

== Organization ==
Eritrean National Cycling Team is under the supervision of Eritrean Commission of Sport and Culture, The Eritrean Sport Federation and the Eritrean National Cycling federation Headquartered in Asmara.

Team Instructor: Samsom Solomon
