= Cristián Rodríguez (cyclist) =

Spanish bicycle racer (born 1995)

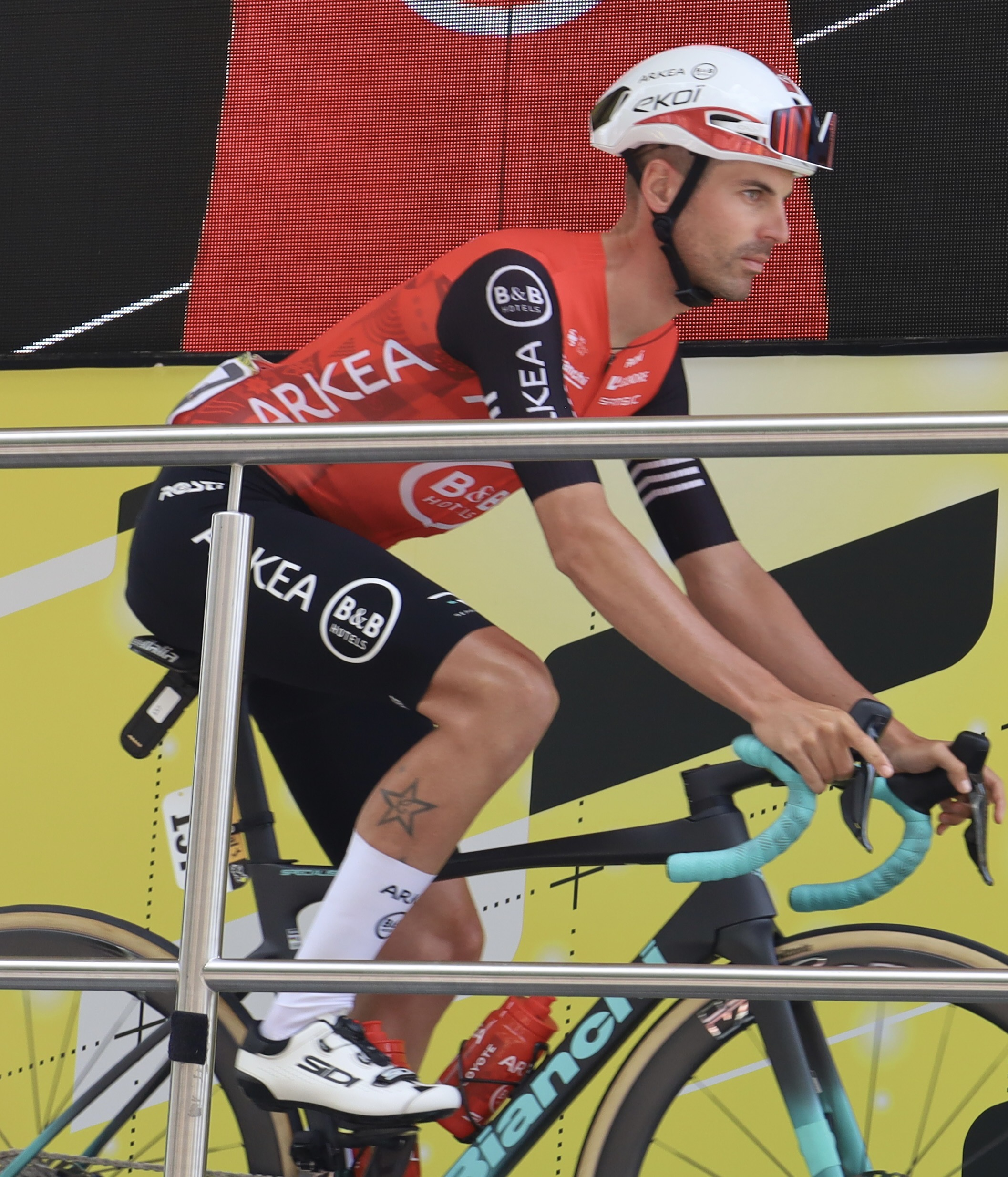
- Rodríguez at the 2025 Tour de France

Personal information
- Full name: Cristián Rodríguez Martin
- Born: 3 March 1995 (age 31) El Ejido, Spain
- Height: 1.78 m (5 ft 10 in)
- Weight: 56 kg (123 lb)

Cycling career
- Sport: Cycling
- Current team: Arkéa–B&B Hotels
- Discipline: Road
- Role: Rider
- Rider type: Climber

Amateur team
- 2014–2015: Caja Rural–Seguros RGA amateur

Professional teams
- 2015: Southeast Pro Cycling (stagiaire)
- 2016–2017: Southeast–Venezuela
- 2018–2020: Caja Rural–Seguros RGA
- 2021–2022: Total Direct Énergie
- 2023–2025: Arkéa–Samsic
- 2026–: XDS Astana Team

Cristián Rodríguez Martin (born 3 March 1995 in El Ejido) is a Spanish racing cyclist, who currently rides for UCI WorldTeam XDS Astana Team. He was named in the start list for the 2016 Giro d'Italia, and the 2017 Giro d'Italia.

== Major results ==
2015
1st Overall Vuelta Ciclista a León

1st Stage 1

2nd Time trial, National Under-23 Road Championships
2016
10th Overall Tour de l'Avenir
2017
4th Giro dell'Appennino
2020
9th Overall Tour de Hongrie
9th Overall Volta a Portugal em Bicicleta
2021 (2 pro wins)
1st Overall Tour du Rwanda

1st Stage 8

4th Overall Route d'Occitanie
5th Mont Ventoux Dénivelé Challenge
2022
1st Mountains classification, Tour of the Basque Country
2nd Overall Vuelta a Andalucía
6th Mont Ventoux Dénivelé Challenge
8th Overall Route d'Occitanie
2023
2nd Overall Route d'Occitanie
2nd Giro dell'Appennino
4th Mont Ventoux Dénivelé Challenge
5th Mercan'Tour Classic
8th Overall Tour of Oman
2024
5th Overall Tour of Oman
9th Tour du Jura
2025 (1)
1st Mercan'Tour Classic
2nd Andorra MoraBanc Clàssica
4th Tour du Jura
9th Classic Grand Besançon Doubs
2026
2nd Overall Tour of Oman
8th Overall Tour Auvergne-Rhône-Alpes
9th Overall Vuelta a España

=== Grand Tour general classification results timeline ===
Grand Tour	2016	2017	2018	2019	2020	2021	2022	2023	2024	2025	2026
Giro d'Italia	103	52	—	—	—	—	—	—	—	—	—
Tour de France	—	—	—	—	—	46	—	—	36	20	—
Vuelta a España	—	—	25	50	—	—	—	13	13	DNF	9

Legend
—	Did not compete
DNF	Did not finish
