= Valentin Ferron =

French cyclist

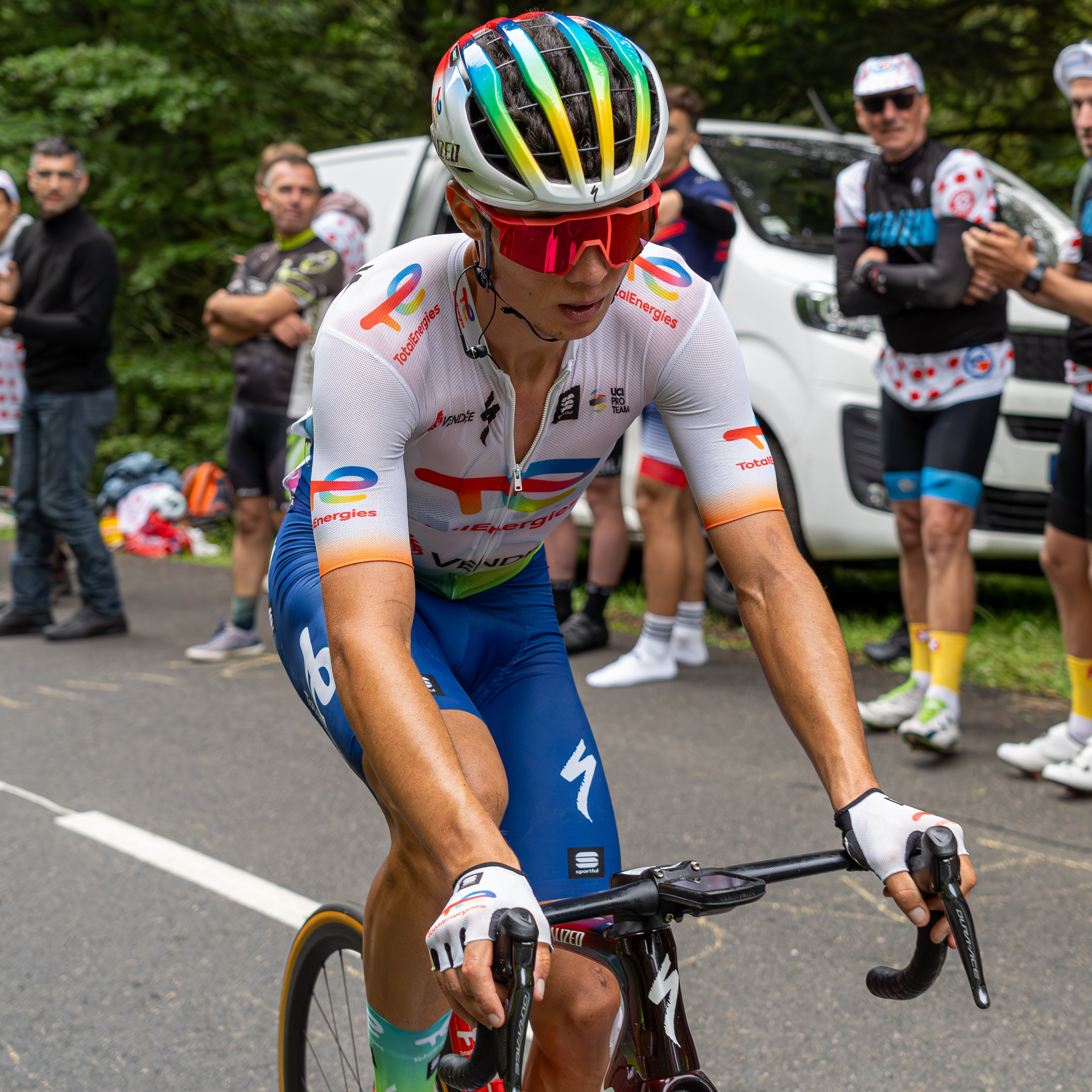
- Ferron at the 2023 Tour de France

Personal information
- Born: 8 February 1998 (age 28) Poitiers, Vienne, France
- Height: 1.74 m (5 ft 9 in)
- Weight: 67 kg (148 lb)

Cycling career
- Sport: Cycling
- Current team: Cofidis
- Discipline: Road
- Role: Rider

Amateur teams
- 2015–2016: UV Poitiers Junior
- 2017–2018: Vendée U
- 2019: Total Direct Énergie (stagiaire)

Professional teams
- 2020–2024: Total Direct Énergie
- 2025–: Cofidis

Valentin Ferron (born 8 February 1998) is a French cyclist, who currently rides for UCI WorldTeam Cofidis. In October 2020, he was named in the startlist for the 2020 Vuelta a España.

== Major results ==
2016
3rd Overall Oberösterreich Juniorenrundfahrt
9th Bernaudeau Junior
2019
2nd Polynormande
2021 (1 pro win)
1st Stage 4 Tour du Rwanda
3rd Trofeo Matteotti
9th Boucles de l'Aulne
2022 (1)
1st Stage 6 Critérium du Dauphiné
2nd Paris–Camembert
3rd Route Adélie
4th Circuito de Getxo
9th Overall Tour Poitou-Charentes en Nouvelle-Aquitaine
2023 (1)
1st Paris–Camembert
2nd Grand Prix La Marseillaise
2nd Polynormande
3rd Overall Région Pays de la Loire Tour
10th Overall Tour Poitou-Charentes en Nouvelle-Aquitaine
2024
4th Boucles de l'Aulne
2025 (1)
1st Grand Prix La Marseillaise

=== Grand Tour general classification results timeline ===
Grand Tour	2020	2021	2022	2023
Giro d'Italia	—	—	—	—
Tour de France	—	—	—	89
Vuelta a España	87	—	—	

Legend
—	Did not compete
DNF	Did not finish
