= B&B Hotels–KTM =

French cycling team

Team information
- UCI code: VCC (2018); VCB (2019); BVC (2020); BBK (2021–2022)
- Registered: France
- Founded: 2018
- Disbanded: 2022
- Discipline: Road
- Status: UCI ProTeam
- Bicycles: Orbea (until 2019); KTM (2020-2022)

Key personnel
- General manager: Jérôme Pineau
- Team managers: Didier Rous; Gilles Pauchard; Jimmy Engoulvent; Yvonnick Bolgiani

Team name history
- 2018 2019 2020 2021 2022: Vital Concept; Vital Concept–B&B Hotels; B&B Hotels–Vital Concept; B&B Hotels p/b KTM; B&B Hotels–KTM

B&B Hotels–KTM was a French UCI ProSeries road cycling team that formed for the 2018 season as Vital Concept Cycling Team. It was first presented at a press conference on 17 August 2017, with an initial budget of €6 million, by its manager Jérôme Pineau. At this press conference fifteen riders were presented, with Bryan Coquard as leader, with another five riders were announced at a later date. The team sponsors the Vélo Club Pays de Loudéac and their headquarters are based in Theix. On 6 January 2018 the team missed out on a wildcard to that year's Tour de France, but were awarded a place in the Critérium du Dauphiné.

The team secured further sponsorship from the Brittany-based hotel chain B&B Hotels and re-branded as Vital Concept–B&B Hotels for the 2019 season. In 2020, the team became B&B Hotels–Vital Concept, as B&B Hotels became the principal sponsor of the team. The team would change identity again in 2021, becoming B&B Hotels p/b (powered by) KTM, and restyled this as B&B Hotels–KTM for 2022.

The team had big plans for 2023, with the expectation of an invitation to the Tour de France and the announcement that Mark Cavendish would join in search of his record-breaking 35th stage victory with support from fellow new signings Cees Bol and Stephen Williams. However, the team ran into financial difficulty due to a shortfall in sponsorship revenue and collapsed in December 2022.

== Final team roster ==
As of 6 February 2022.

| Rider | Date of birth |
|---|---|
| Pierre Barbier (FRA) | 25 September 1997 (age 28) |
| Cyril Barthe (FRA) | 14 February 1996 (age 30) |
| Alan Boileau (FRA) | 25 June 1999 (age 27) |
| Franck Bonnamour (FRA) | 20 June 1995 (age 31) |
| Maxime Chevalier (FRA) | 16 May 1999 (age 27) |
| Jens Debusschere (BEL) | 28 August 1989 (age 37) |
| Thibault Ferasse (FRA) | 12 September 1994 (age 31) |
| Cyril Gautier (FRA) | 26 September 1987 (age 38) |
| Alexis Gougeard (FRA) | 5 March 1993 (age 33) |
| Miguel Heidemann (GER) | 27 January 1998 (age 28) |
| Jonathan Hivert (FRA) | 23 March 1985 (age 41) |
| Quentin Jaurégui (FRA) | 22 April 1994 (age 32) |

| Rider | Date of birth |
|---|---|
| Victor Koretzky (FRA) | 26 August 1994 (age 32) |
| Adrien Lagrée (FRA) | 25 April 1997 (age 29) |
| Axel Laurance (FRA) | 13 April 2001 (age 25) |
| Jérémy Lecroq (FRA) | 7 April 1995 (age 31) |
| Cyril Lemoine (FRA) | 3 March 1983 (age 43) |
| Eliot Lietaer (BEL) | 15 August 1990 (age 36) |
| Julien Morice (FRA) | 20 July 1991 (age 35) |
| Luca Mozzato (ITA) | 15 February 1998 (age 28) |
| Raphaël Parisella (CAN) | 23 October 2002 (age 23) |
| Pierre Rolland (FRA) | 10 October 1986 (age 39) |
| Sebastian Schönberger (AUT) | 14 May 1994 (age 32) |
| Jordi Warlop (BEL) | 4 June 1996 (age 30) |

== Continental Championships ==
2019
European Track (Individual pursuit), Corentin Ermenault
European Track (Points race), Bryan Coquard
