= 2019 UCI Africa Tour =

- Fifteenth edition of the UCI Africa Tour

Details
- Dates: 26 October 2018–20 October 2019
- Location: Africa
- Races: 5

The 2018 UCI Africa Tour was the 15th season of the UCI Africa Tour. The season began on 26 October 2018 with the Tour du Faso and ended on 20 October 2019.

The points leader, based on the cumulative results of previous races, wears the UCI Africa Tour cycling jersey.

Throughout the season, points are awarded to the top finishers of stages within stage races and the final general classification standings of each of the stages races and one-day events. The quality and complexity of a race also determines how many points are awarded to the top finishers: the higher the UCI rating of a race, the more points are awarded. The UCI ratings from highest to lowest are as follows:

- Multi-day events: 2.HC, 2.1 and 2.2
- One-day events: 1.HC, 1.1 and 1.2

== Events ==
=== 2018 ===
Date	Race Name	Location	UCI Rating	Winner	Team
26 October – 4 November	Tour du Faso	Burkina Faso	2.2	Mathias Sorgho (BUR)	Burkina Faso national cycling team

=== 2019 ===
Date	Race Name	Location	UCI Rating	Winner	Team
21–27 January	La Tropicale Amissa Bongo	Gabon	2.1	Niccolò Bonifazio (ITA)	Total Direct Énergie
4–9 February	Tour de l'Espoir	Cameroon	2.Ncup	Yacob Debesay (ERI)	Eritel
24 February – 3 March	Tour du Rwanda	Rwanda	2.1	Merhawi Kudus (ERI)	Astana
4–8 March	Tour of Good Hope	South Africa	2.2	Marc Pritzen (RSA)	OfficeGuru Racing
22–26 March	Tour d'Egypte	Egypt	2.2	Polychronis Tzortzakis (GRE)	Tarteletto–Isorex
5–14 April	Tour du Maroc	Morocco	2.2	Laurent Évrard (BEL)	Sovac Algérie
21–28 April	Tour du Sénégal	Senegal	2.2	Didier Munyaneza (RWA)	Benediction–Excel Energy
5 May	100 Cycle Challenge	South Africa	1.2	Jayde Julius (RSA)	Team Dimension Data
14 – 19 May	Tour of Limpopo	South Africa	2.2	Samuele Battistella (ITA)	Team Dimension Data
1–9 June	Tour du Cameroun	Cameroon	2.2	Radoslav Konstantinov (BUL)	Team Martigues SC-Drag Bicycles
17 June	Les Challenges de la Marche Verte – GP Sakia El Hamra	Morocco	1.2	Hermann Keller (GER)	Team Embrace The World
19 June	Les Challenges de la Marche Verte - GP Oued Eddahab	Morocco	1.2	Jason Oosthuizen (RSA)	TEG Pro Cycling Team
20 June	Les Challenges de la Marche Verte - GP Al Massira	Morocco	1.2	Gustav Basson (RSA)	TEG Pro Cycling Team
22–24 June	Challenge International du Sahara Marocain	Morocco	2.2	Gustav Basson (RSA)	TEG Pro Cycling Team
22 July	Challenge du Prince - Trophée Princier	Morocco	1.2	Jayde Julius (RSA)	Team Dimension Data
24 July	Challenge du Prince - Trophée de l'Anniversaire	Morocco	1.2	Youcef Reguigui (ALG)	Terengganu Cycling Team
25 July	Challenge du Prince - Trophée de la Maison Royale	Morocco	1.2	Youcef Reguigui (ALG)	Terengganu Cycling Team
9–12 October	Africa Cup	South Africa	1.2	Postoponed	
16–20 October	Grand Prix Chantal Biya	Cameroon	2.2	Azzedine Lagab (ALG)	Bahrain Cycling Academy

== Final standings ==
=== Individual classification ===
Rank	Name	Points
1.	Daryl Impey (RSA)	1399
2.	Youcef Reguigui (ALG)	921
3.	Ryan Gibbons (RSA)	812
4.	Merhawi Kudus (ERI)	636
5.	Sirak Tesfom (ERI)	438.5
6.	Azzedine Lagab (ALG)	332
7.	Reinardt Janse van Rensburg (RSA)	329
8.	Mekseb Debesay (ERI)	312.5
9.	Natnael Berhane (ERI)	298
10.	Stefan de Bod (RSA)	248.67

=== Team classification ===
Rank	Team	Points
1.	(South Africa) ProTouch	766
2.	(Algeria) Sovac	497.66
3.	(Rwanda) Benediction–Excel Energy	308.75
4.	(South Africa) TEG Pro Cycling Team	280
5.	(Guinea-Bissau) Java Kiwi Atlántico	114
6.	(Angola) BAI–Sicasal–Petro de Luanda	60

=== Nation classification ===
Rank	Nation	Points
1.	South Africa	3504.67
2.	Eritrea	2570.5
3.	Algeria	2019.33
4.	Morocco	902
5.	Rwanda	809
6.	Burkina Faso	374
7.	Ethiopia	364
8.	Namibia	301
9.	Tunisia	197
10.	Angola	89
11.	Mauritius	89
12.	Cameroon	56
13.	Ivory Coast	55
14.	Kenya	53
15.	Benin	34.99
16.	Egypt	23.01
17.	Seychelles	20
18.	Nigeria	15
19.	Democratic Republic of the Congo	11
20.	Uganda	5
21.	Zimbabwe	3
22.	Botswana	1
