= Cape Town Cycle Tour =

Annual cycle race hosted in Cape Town, South Africa

Race details
- Date: Second Sunday in March
- Region: Cape Town, South Africa
- Discipline: Road race
- Type: One-day
- Organiser: Cape Town Cycle Tour Trust
- Web site: www.capetowncycletour.com

History
- First edition: 1978; 48 years ago
- Editions: 45 (as of 2023)
- First winner: Lawrence Whittaker (RSA)
- Most wins: Willie Engelbrecht (RSA) (5 wins)
- Most recent: Ryan Gibbons (RSA)

History (women)
- First winner: Janice Theis (RSA)
- Most wins: Anriette Schoeman (RSA) (7 wins)
- Most recent: Lisa Bone (RSA)

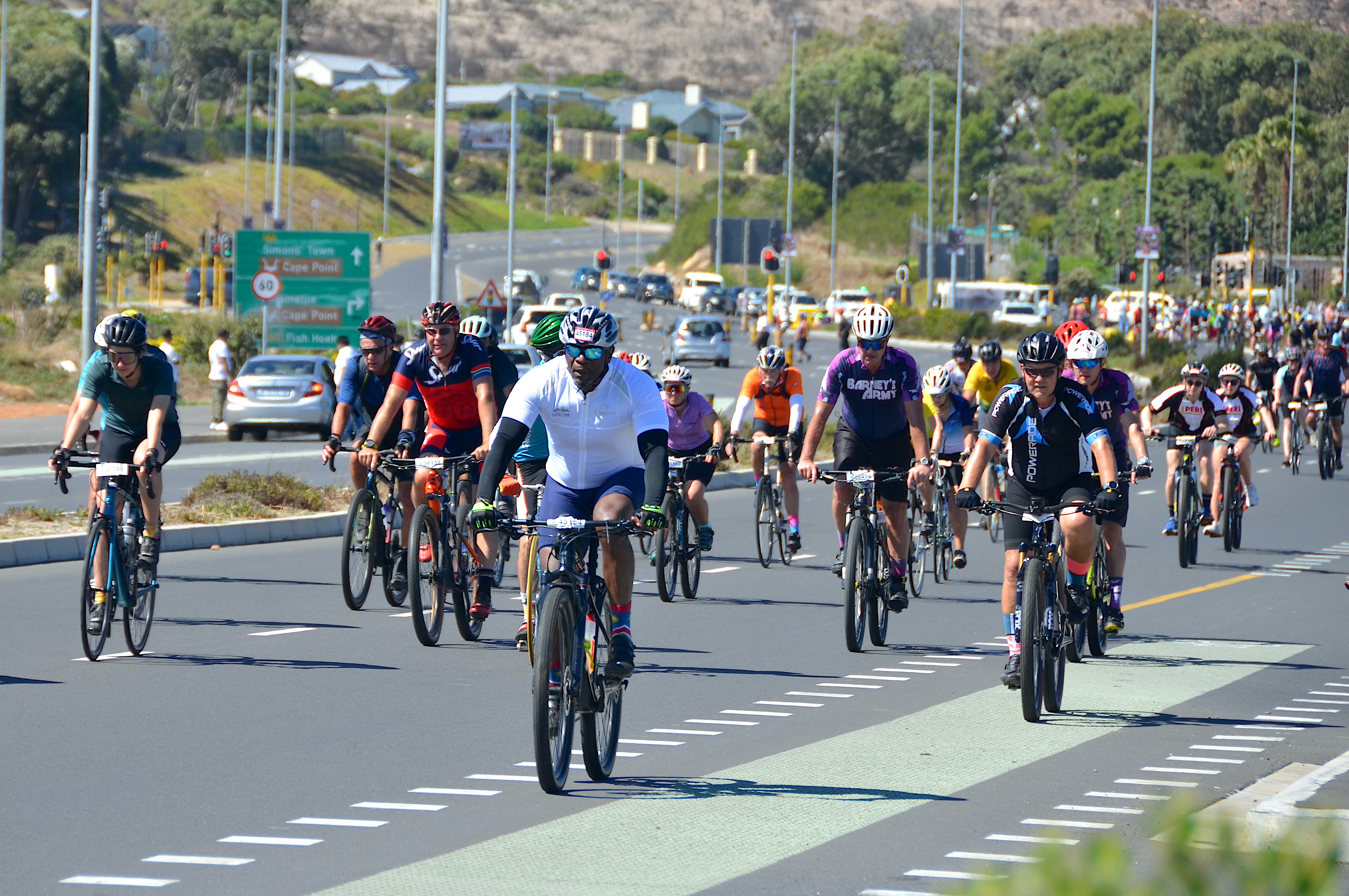
Sun Valley, Cape Town Cycle Tour 2024

The Cape Town Cycle Tour, formerly known as the Cape Argus Cycle Tour, is an annual cycle race hosted in Cape Town, South Africa, usually 109 km (68 mi) long. It is the first event outside Europe to be included in the Union Cycliste Internationale's Golden Bike Series. South Africa hosts some of the largest, by the number of entrants, sporting events in the world with three being the largest of their type. The Cape Town Cycle Tour, with as many as 35,000 cyclists taking part, is the world's largest individually timed cycle race. The other two are the world's largest ultra-marathon running event, the Comrades Marathon, and the world's largest open water swim, the Midmar Mile.

The Cycle Tour formed the last leg of the Giro del Capo, a multi-stage race for professional and leading registered riders which was last run in 2010.

It is traditionally staged on the second Sunday of March and has enjoyed well-known competitors such as Miguel Indurain, Jan Ulrich, Matt Damon, Helen Zille and Lance Armstrong.

== Route ==
In recent years the race has usually followed a scenic 109 km (68 mi) circular route from Cape Town down the Cape Peninsula and back. The race starts at the Grand Parade in Cape Town. It then follows a short section of the N2 called Nelson Mandela Boulevard, then the M3 to Muizenberg, and then Main Road along the False Bay coast to Simon's Town and Smitswinkel Bay. The route then crosses the peninsula in a westerly direction, past the entrance to Cape of Good Hope section of the Table Mountain National Park (within which Cape Point is situated). It then heads north along the Atlantic coast through Scarborough, Kommetjie, Noordhoek, Chapman's Peak, Hout Bay over Suikerbossie Hill to Camps Bay and ends next to the Cape Town Stadium in Green Point.

In 2009 and 2010, as well as during previous years until 1999 the race had followed slightly different routes, between 104 km (65 mi) and 110 km (68 mi) in length – see the table below.

== Records ==
The course records for conventional bicycles for the 110 km course over Chapman's Peak are:

- Men: 02:25:48 by Tyler Lange (2025)
- Women: 02:44:04 by Renee Scott (1991).

The record for the highest number of consecutive victories within a competitor's age group belongs to Penny Krohn, who scored 25 such age group wins.

By far the quickest time ever recorded (and highest ever average speed) was set on the 105 km course in 1993 by Wimpie van der Merwe in his fully faired recumbent (02:16:40, averaging 46.1 km/h).

The oldest cyclist to complete the race within the maximum allowed seven hours is Japie Malan (92 years old at the time) during the 2012 Cycle Tour – on a tandem in a time of 05:49:00. He is the oldest man (90 years old at the time) to complete the race on a single bicycle during the 2010 Cycle Tour in a time of 06:48:52. He is also the oldest man to have ridden the Argus for the first time, which he did in 2004 when he was 84 years old. The oldest woman to complete the race is Mary Warner (80 years old at the time) during the 2006 tour, in a time of 06:43:38.

== History of the Cycle Tour ==
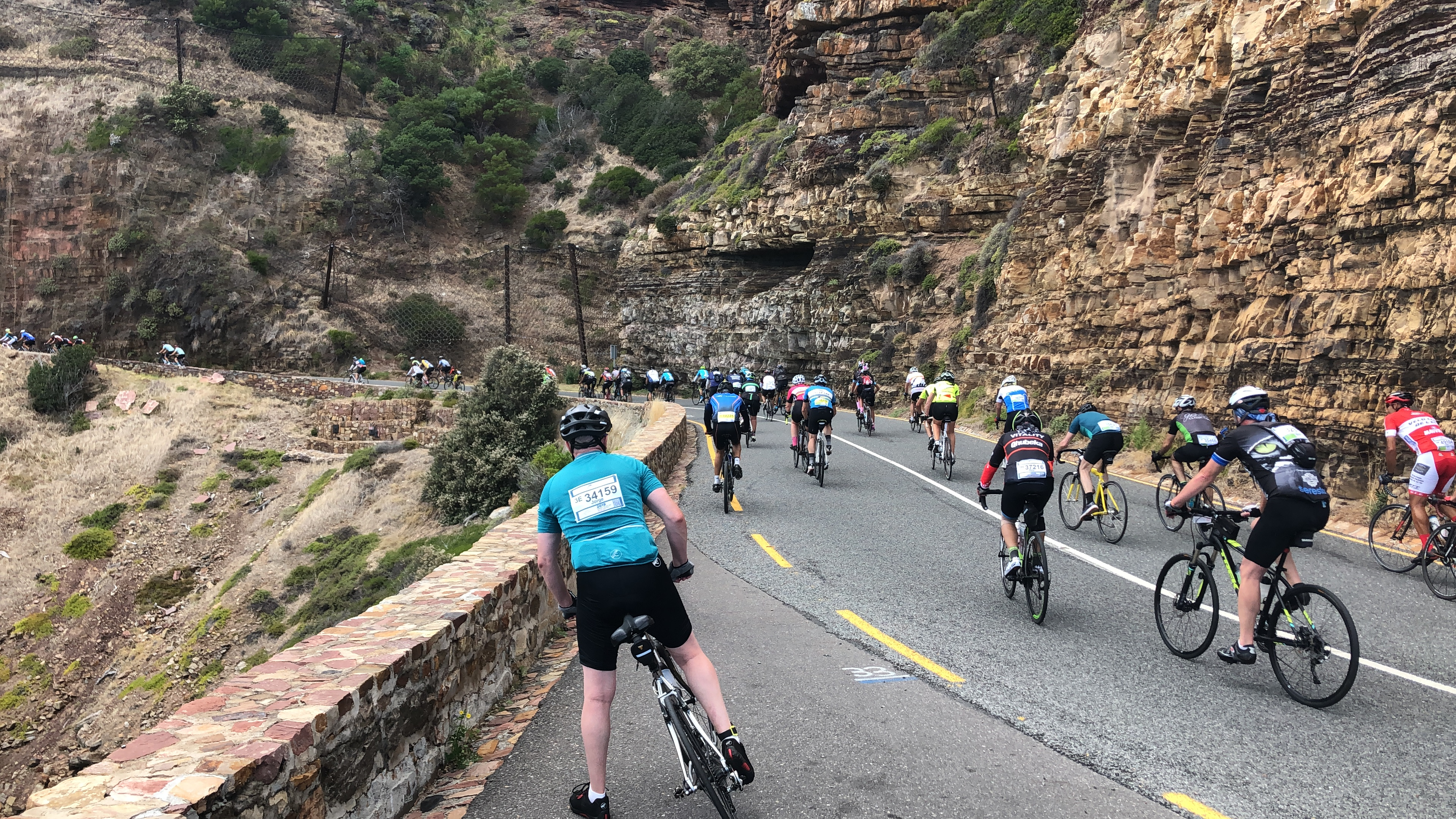
Chapman's Peak, Cape Town Cycle Tour 2019

In 1978, Bill Mylrea and John Stegmann organised the Big Ride-In to draw attention to the need for cycle paths in South Africa. The Ride-In drew hundreds of cyclists, including the Mayor of Cape Town at the time. The ride was first won by Lawrence Whittaker in September 1978.

This race was originally planned to run over 140 km (87 mi), including a leg to Cape Point, but was reduced to a 104 km (65 mi) route when authority to enter the then Cape Point Nature Reserve was refused. The organisers convinced an initially reluctant Cape Argus, a local newspaper and sponsor, to grant the event the right to use its name.

The event now forms part of one of five cycling events which take place over a period of one week starting a week before the Cycle Tour and culminating in the Cycle Tour. The other events include:

- Tricycle Tour (youngsters under 6 years of age)
- Junior Cycle Tour (youngsters between 6 and 12 years of age)
- MTB Challenge (Mountain Bike)
- Giro del Capo (5-day pro stage race, the last day of which is the Cycle Tour itself)

=== Route alterations and stoppages ===
Between 2000 and 2003, the race followed an alternative route due to the closure of Chapman's Peak Drive, with a return trip via Ou Kaapse Weg and the Blue Route.

The race has been stopped three times due to extreme weather, although in the first two cases many competitors had completed the race before the stoppage, and once significantly shortened due to fire. It has been cancelled once:

- The 2002 race was stopped at 14:45 at Ou Kaapse Weg when temperatures reached 42 °C (108 °F)
- The 2009 race was stopped at 16:30 at Chapman's Peak due to strong winds, with gusts up to 100 km/h (62 mph) that blew cyclists off their cycles. Initially the cut off time was extended from 7 to 8 hours due to the strong wind. Despite the late closure many cyclists were affected, because starting for some groups was delayed by as much as 2 hours due to extreme winds at the starting line-up.
- The 2015 race took place on a significantly shortened route of 47 km to the end of the Blue Route and back, following a major fire earlier that month that led to the closure of Chapman's Peak Drive and parts of Ou Kaapse Weg.
- The 2017 race was cancelled on the day due to extreme weather. Wind speeds in excess of 100 km/h in addition to fires on part of the route caused the event organisers to cancel after the first round of cyclists had started the race. The threat of possible protest action along a section of the route also increased safety concerns. Participants who had started already were turned back at the end of the M3 highway.

== Details of each event ==
Key information regarding each of the race events is as follows:

Key: Course record

Year	km	Entrants	Finishers	Men	Time	Women	Time	Notes on the route	Notes on the weather and the race
1978	104	525	446	(South Africa) Lawrence Whittaker	03:02:25	(South Africa) Janice Theis	04:35:00	Started at the Castle, Strand Street. Ended in Camps Bay.	
1979	104	999	760	(South Africa) Hans Degenaar	02:52:38	(South Africa) Janice Theis	03:36:46	same as previous year	
1980	104	1398	1119	(South Africa) Hennie Wentzel	03:02:18	(South Africa) Monika Gasson	03:59:00	same as previous year	
1981	104	1669	1372	(South Africa) Ertjies Bezuidenhout	02:47:42	(South Africa) Ann Wood	03:40:01	Start moved to Hertzog Boulevard to reduce congestion at on-ramp to Eastern Boulevard.	
1982	104	1698	1372	(South Africa) Mark Pinder	03:01:25	(South Africa) Martina le Roux	03:34:54	same as previous year	Southeaster played havoc with bannering at start, and howled throughout the day.
1983	104	2302	1929	(South Africa) Robbie McIntosh	02:49:55	(South Africa) Heather Smithers	03:21:20	same as previous year	Very windy. First bicycle to cross the finish line was a tandem ridden by William Smith and Francois du Toit.
1984	104	2373	2023	(South Africa) Theuns Mulder	02:55:07	(South Africa) Isavel Roche-Kelly	03:19:14	same as previous year	Quickest overall was Lloyd Wright on his unconventional bike in 02:43:51.
1985	104	3008	2445	(South Africa) Hennie Wentzel		(South Africa) Louise van Riet Lowe	03:04:36	same as previous year	
1986	104	3494	3086	(South Africa) Ertjies Bezuidenhout	02:40:20	(South Africa) Cathy Carstens	02:49:55	same as previous year	
1987	104	5934	4761	(South Africa) Hennie Wentzel	02:43:05	(South Africa) Cathy Carstens	03:03:24	same as previous year	Strong northwesterly blowing, Heavy rain, high winds and extreme cold, called 'Siberian' weather by The Argus.
1988	104	10850	8707	(South Africa) Willie Engelbrecht	02:36:54	(South Africa) Cathy Carstens	02:54:23	same as previous year	Windless. Quickest overall was Lloyd Wright on his faired recumbent in 02:33:03.
1989	105	12802	10559	(South Africa) Willie Engelbrecht	02:49:24	(South Africa) Cathy Carstens	02:57:55	Finish line moved to Maiden's Cove, adding an extra kilometre to the course	Windy race. Quickest overall was Lloyd Wright on his faired recumbent in 02:37:35.
1990	105	14427	11235	(South Africa) Willie Engelbrecht	02:41:56	(South Africa) Cathy Carstens	02:53:50	same as previous year	Safety helmets became compulsory. Quickest overall was Lloyd Wright on his faired recumbent in 02:40:29 (a hat trick of fastest times).
1991	105	15593	12750	(South Africa) Robbie McIntosh	02:28:46	(South Africa) Rene Scott	02:44:40	same as previous year	Perfect weather conditions.
1992	105	17274	13334	(South Africa) Willie Engelbrecht	02:50:04	(South Africa) Jackie Martin	03:03:10	same as previous year	
1993	105	18659	15256	(South Africa) Wayne Burgess	02:33:35	(South Africa) Kim Carter	02:51:46	same as previous year	Wimpie van der Merwe raced 2:16:40 on a faired recumbent (still the highest ever average speed of 46.1 km/h (28.6 mph)).
1994	105	20964	17289	(South Africa) Willie Engelbrecht	02:23:22	(South Africa) Jackie Martin	02:49:19	same as previous year	Windless.
1995	105	25313	20535	(Sweden) Michael Andersson	02:22:56	(South Africa) Jackie Martin	02:45:52	same as previous year	Near-perfect weather conditions
1996	105	28711	22294	(Germany) Thomas Liese	02:40:16	(South Africa) Erica Green	02:58:33	same as previous year	
1997	105	28875	22717	(Norway) Kurt Asle Arvesen	02:38:47	(South Africa) Erica Green	02:58:37	same as previous year	Very good weather.
1998	105	34162	25955	(South Africa) Malcolm Lange	02:39:25	(South Africa) Anke Erlank	02:58:27	same as previous year	
1999	105	36153	28885	(South Africa) Jacques Fullard	02:31:26	(South Africa) Michelle Lombardi	02:52:55	With finish line still at Maiden's Cove, the carnaval was moved to Green Point	First year of using electronic timing transponders.
2000	109	39864	30081	(South Africa) Morne Bester	02:39:35	(South Africa) Anriette Schoeman	02:57:34	Chapman's Peak closed. Return trip via Ou Kaapse Weg and Blue Route, with finish in Green Point.	
2001	109	39715	30785	(South Africa) Douglas Ryder	02:31:57	(South Africa) Anriette Schoeman	02:55:21	same as previous year	
2002	109	39831	28050	(Australia) Allan Davis	02:35:34	(South Africa) Anriette Schoeman	02:57:29	same as previous year	Heat wave: race was stopped at 2:45 at Ou Kaapse Weg when temperatures reached 42 °C (108 °F).
2003	109	39668	27841	(South Africa) Malcolm Lange	02:29:29	(South Africa) Anriette Schoeman	02:54:02	same as previous year	Perfect weather conditions.
2004	109	42614	31219	(Italy) Antonio Salomone	02:32:23	(South Africa) Anke Erlank	02:49:23	Route via Chapman's Peak again, with the finish line at Green Point.	Sweltering day.
2005	109	39929	28334	(England) Russell Downing	02:37:50	(South Africa) Anke Erlank	03:00:19	same as previous year	Winds of more than 40 km/h (25 mph) were recorded at places.
2006	109	40064	28818	(Germany) Steffen Radochla	02:34:28	(South Africa) Anriette Schoeman	02:59:08	same as previous year	Cool weather and light rain.
2007	109	41279	29296	(South Africa) Robert Hunter	02:32:36	(South Africa) Anke Erlank	02:48:29	same as previous year	Near perfect weather
2008	109	37978	28669	(South Africa) Robert Hunter	02:27:29	(South Africa) Cherise Taylor	02:50:51	same as previous year	
2009	110	38594	25799	(South Africa) Arran Brown	02:46:32	(Sweden) Jennie Stenerhag	03:06:01	Cyclists diverted over Boyes Drive to avoid construction in Main Road	Dubbed "the Tour of Storms", with the strongest winds ever. Fences at the start blown down and banners ripped to shreds, with gusts of up to 120 km/h (75 mph). The cut off time was extended to 8 hrs, but the race was eventually stopped at Chapman's Peak at 16:30, both due to extreme weather.
2010	110	37662	28745	(South Africa) Malcolm Lange	02:39:55	(South Africa) Anriette Schoeman	03:06:11	same as previous year	Wind was a problem again, with wind speeds reaching up to 46 km/h (29 mph) – but nothing like the wind of the previous year.
2011	110	36848	28970	(South Africa) Tyler Day	02:32:10	(South Africa) Cherise Taylor	02:49:45	same as previous year	Perfect conditions.
2012	110		31126	(South Africa) Reinardt Janse van Rensburg	02:36:17	(South Africa) Ashleigh Moolman	02:52:24	same as previous year	Initially good conditions, becoming hot later in the day. Late finishers suffered in the heat, and refreshment stations ran out of water. A pile-up close to the finishing line, involving top women cyclists and others, affected the outcome of the women's race.
2013	109	?	31700	(South Africa) Herman Fouche	02:39:53	(South Africa) Anriette Schoeman	02:52:54	Route via Chapman's Peak again, with the finish line at Green Point.	?
2014	109	34500	31046	(South Africa) Nolan Hoffman	02:39:01	(South Africa) Cherise Stander	02:51:00	Ditto, despite landslides that closed Chappies two months earlier.	Windy, with wind speeds of up to 83 km/h (52 mph) recorded at the start.
2015	47	~ 34000	32129	(South Africa) Nolan Hoffman	01:01:49*	(South Africa) Lynette Burger	01:17:52*	Route shortened due to fires	
2016	109		28751	(South Africa) Clint Hendricks	2:35:31	(South Africa) An-Li Kachelhoffer	02:51:26		
2017	109	35000	Cancelled						Cancelled on the day it was to take place due to safety concerns following very high winds reaching speeds of over 100 km/h (62 mph). Other reasons also cited for the cancellation were fires on part of the route in Hout Bay and the possibility of protest action on a section of the route.
2018	109/78 (M/F)	35000	26384	(South Africa) Nolan Hoffman	02:37:30	(Mauritius) Kimberley Le Court De Billot	02:11:50	Start line moved from Hertzog Boulevard to the Grand Parade.	Elite women raced a shorter route starting in Fish Hoek to avoid their race being influenced by other groups.
2019	109/78 (M/F)		23136	(New Zealand) Sam Gaze	2:39:42	(South Africa) Cherise Willeit	02:16:11		
2020	109/78 (M/F)		22500	(South Africa) Travis Barrett	2:30:04	(South Africa) Cherise Willeit	02:07:48		
2021	109/78 (M/F)		18000	(South Africa) Nolan Hoffman	02:37:12	(Mauritius) Kimberley Le Court De Billot	02:13:17	Postponed 17 October 2021	
2022	109/78 (M/F)		16000	(South Africa) Marc Pritzen	2:37:54	(Mauritius) Kimberley Le Court De Billot	02:08:44		
2023	109/78 (M/F)			(South Africa) Chris Jooste	2:36:14	(Mauritius) Kimberley Le Court De Billot	2:13:20		
2024	109/72 (M/F)			(South Africa) Kent Main	2:31:22	(South Africa) Tiffany Keep	2:12:02		
2025	109/78 (M/F)	28000		(South Africa) Tyler Lange	2:25:48	(Germany) Pia Grünewald	2:05:18		
2026	109/78 (M/F)			(South Africa) Ryan Gibbons	2:33:06	(South Africa) Lisa Bone	2:06:26		

== See also ==
- 94.7 Cycle Challenge
