= Jason Oosthuizen =

South African cyclist

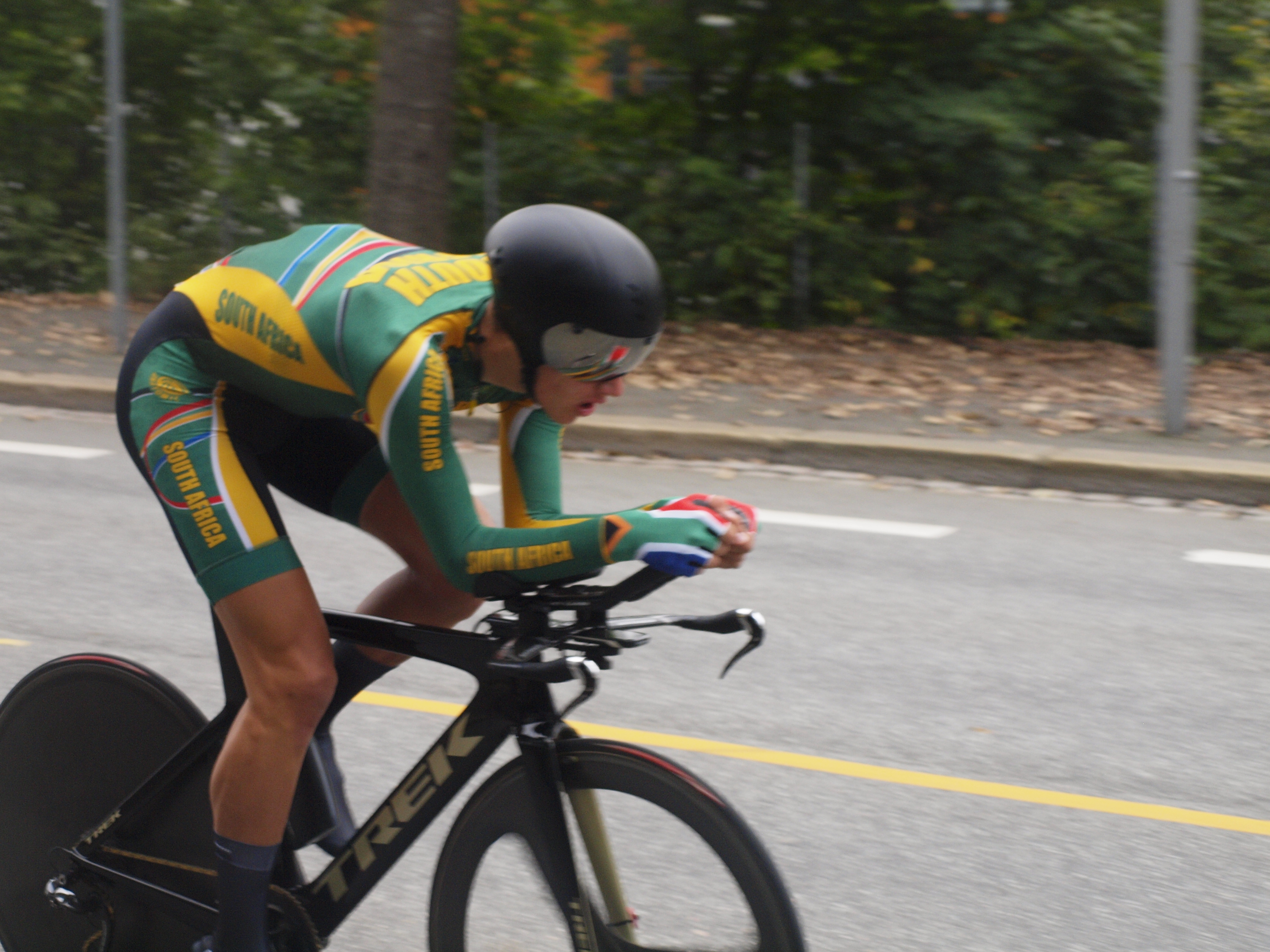
- Jason Oosthuizen at the 2017 UCI World Championships

Personal information
- Full name: Jason Oosthuizen
- Born: 5 May 1999 (age 27) Krugersdorp, South Africa

Cycling career
- Sport: Cycling
- Current team: CR4C Roanne
- Disciplines: Road; Track
- Role: Rider

Amateur teams
- 2017: Team Pro Touch
- 2018: ACDC Luso
- 2018: Baguet–MIBA Poorten–Indulek
- 2020–: CR4C Roanne

Professional team
- 2019: TEG Pro Cycling Team

Jason Oosthuizen (born 5 May 1999) is a South African cyclist, who currently rides for French amateur team CR4C Roanne.

== Major results ==
=== Road ===
2016
2nd Time trial, National Junior Road Championships
2017
National Junior Road Championships

1st Road race
1st Time trial

2018
1st Road race, National Under-23 Road Championships
6th Overall Tour de Limpopo
2019
1st Team time trial, African Games
1st Stage 2 Challenge International du Sahara Marocain
Les Challenges de la Marche Verte

1st GP Oued Eddahab
9th GP Al Massira

2nd Overall Tour of Good Hope
7th Overall Tour de Limpopo
7th 100 Cycle Challenge
2021
1st Team time trial, African Road Championships
2nd Time trial, National Under-23 Road Championships

=== Track ===
2016
National Junior Track Championships

1st Individual pursuit
1st Team pursuit (with Rennie Anthony, Jacques Van Niekerk and Joshua van Wyk)
1st Kilo

2017
African Junior Track Championships

1st Kilo
1st Individual pursuit
3rd Omnium

National Junior Track Championships

1st Points race
1st Scratch
1st Keirin
1st Elimination race
