= Hendrik Kruger =

South African cyclist

Personal information
- Full name: Hendrik B. Kruger
- Nickname: HB
- Born: 30 July 1991 (age 35) Potchefstroom, South Africa

Cycling career
- Sport: Cycling
- Current team: Valley Electrical–Titan Racing
- Disciplines: Road; Mountain biking
- Role: Rider

Amateur teams
- 2013: Martigues SC–Vivelo
- 2013: La Pomme Marseille (stagiare)
- 2014: Team Bonitas
- 2015: Team Abantu
- 2016: Team Telkom
- 2017: Team BCX
- 2018: Team Pro Touch
- 2019: AlfaBodyWorks–Giant
- 2021–: Alfa Bodyworks–Titan Racing

Professional teams
- 2012: Team Bonitas
- 2020: ProTouch

Hendrik B. Kruger (born 30 July 1991) is a South African cyclist, who currently rides for South African amateur team Alfa Bodyworks–Titan Racing.

== Major results ==
2013
10th Road race, African Road Championships
2015
African Games

1st Team time trial
5th Time trial
9th Road race

African Track Championships

1st Individual pursuit
1st Team pursuit

1st Individual pursuit, National Track Championships
KZN Autumn Series

1st Mayday Classic
2nd PMB Road Classic
2nd Hibiscus Cycle Classic

5th Road race, National Road Championships
2016
3rd Overall Mpumalanga Tour
2019
1st Amashova Durban Classic
1st Mountains classification Tour of Good Hope
8th Overall Tour de Limpopo
