= 2019 La Tropicale Amissa Bongo =

2019 UCI Africa Tour

Race details
- Dates: 21–27 January 2019
- Stages: 7
- Distance: 845.2 km (525.2 mi)
- Winning time: 20h 39' 25"

Results
	Winner	Niccolò Bonifazio (ITA)
	Second	Lorrenzo Manzin (FRA)
	Third	André Greipel (GER)

The 2019 La Tropicale Amissa Bongo was a road cycling stage race that took place in Gabon and Equatorial Guinea between 21 and 27 January 2019. The race was rated as a 2.1 event as part of the 2019 UCI Africa Tour, and was the 14th edition of the race.

== Teams ==
Fifteen teams started the race. Each team had a maximum of six riders:

UCI Professional Continental teams

- Vital Concept–B&B Hotels
- Arkéa–Samsic
- Androni Giocattoli–Sidermec
- Direct Énergie

UCI Continental team

- ProTouch Sports

National teams

- Algeria
- Cameroon
- Eritrea
- Gabon
- Rwanda
- Burkina Faso
- Ivory Coast
- Ethiopia
- Morocco
- Mauritius

== Route ==
Stage characteristics and winners
Stage	Date	Course	Distance	Type	Stage winner
1	January 21	Bongoville to Moanda	100 km (62 mi)	Hilly stage	Niccolò Bonifazio (ITA)
2	January 22	Franceville to Okondja	170 km (110 mi)	Flat stage	Niccolò Bonifazio (ITA)
3	January 23	Lékoni to Franceville	100 km (62 mi)	Flat stage	Biniam Girmay (ERI)
4	January 24	Mitzic to Oyem	120 km (75 mi)	Flat stage	Lorrenzo Manzin (FRA)
5	January 25	Bitam to Mongomo	120 km (75 mi)	Flat stage	Niccolò Bonifazio (ITA)
6	January 26	Bitam to Oyem	110 km (68 mi)	Hilly stage	André Greipel (GER)
7	January 27	Nkok to Libreville	140 km (87 mi)	Flat stage	Lorrenzo Manzin (FRA)

== Stages ==
=== Stage 1 ===
Stage 1 result

Rank	Rider	Team	Time
1	Niccolò Bonifazio (ITA)	Direct Énergie	2h 43' 23"
2	Lorrenzo Manzin (FRA)	Vital Concept–B&B Hotels	s.t.
3	André Greipel (GER)	Arkéa–Samsic	s.t.
4	Youcef Reguigui (ALG)	Algeria	s.t.
5	Henok Mulubrhan (ERI)	Eritrea	s.t.
6	Alexandre Pichot (FRA)	Direct Énergie	s.t.
7	Rohan du Plooy (RSA)	ProTouch Sports	s.t.
8	Andrea Vendrame (ITA)	Androni Giocattoli–Sidermec	s.t.
9	Abderrahmane Hamza (ALG)	Algeria	s.t.
10	Sirak Tesfom (ERI)	Eritrea	s.t.

General classification after Stage 1

Rank	Rider	Team	Time
1	Niccolò Bonifazio (ITA)	Direct Énergie	2h 43' 13"
2	Sirak Tesfom (ERI)	Eritrea	+ 2"
3	Didier Munyaneza (RWA)	Rwanda	+ 3"
4	Lorrenzo Manzin (FRA)	Vital Concept–B&B Hotels	+ 4"
5	André Greipel (GER)	Arkéa–Samsic	+ 6"
6	Youcef Reguigui (ALG)	Algeria	+ 10"
7	Henok Mulubrhan (ERI)	Eritrea	s.t.
8	Alexandre Pichot (FRA)	Direct Énergie	s.t.
9	Rohan du Plooy (RSA)	ProTouch Sports	s.t.
10	Andrea Vendrame (ITA)	Androni Giocattoli–Sidermec	s.t.

=== Stage 2 ===
Stage 2 result

Rank	Rider	Team	Time
1	Niccolò Bonifazio (ITA)	Direct Énergie	4h 04' 23"
2	André Greipel (GER)	Arkéa–Samsic	s.t.
3	Bonaventure Uwizeyimana (RWA)	Rwanda	s.t.
4	Andrea Vendrame (ITA)	Androni Giocattoli–Sidermec	s.t.
5	Fiseha Gebremariam (ETH)	Ethiopia	s.t.
6	Youcef Reguigui (ALG)	Algeria	s.t.
7	Metkel Eyob (ERI)	Eritrea	s.t.
8	Redwan Ebrahim (ETH)	Ethiopia	s.t.
9	Alexandre Mayer (MRI)	Mauritius	s.t.
10	Lahcen Sabbehi (MAR)	Morocco	s.t.

General classification after Stage 2

Rank	Rider	Team	Time
1	Niccolò Bonifazio (ITA)	Direct Énergie	6h 47' 26"
2	Sirak Tesfom (ERI)	Eritrea	+ 9"
3	André Greipel (GER)	Arkéa–Samsic	+ 10"
4	Didier Munyaneza (RWA)	Rwanda	+ 13"
5	Lorrenzo Manzin (FRA)	Vital Concept–B&B Hotels	+ 14"
6	Bonaventure Uwizeyimana (RWA)	Rwanda	+ 16"
7	Daniel Teklehaimanot (ERI)	Eritrea	+ 17"
8	Rohan du Plooy (RSA)	ProTouch Sports	+ 18"
9	Adrien Petit (FRA)	Direct Énergie	+ 19"
10	Youcef Reguigui (ALG)	Algeria	+ 20"

=== Stage 3 ===
Stage 3 result

Rank	Rider	Team	Time
1	Biniam Girmay (ERI)	Eritrea	2h 35' 09"
2	Youcef Reguigui (ALG)	Algeria	s.t.
3	Niccolò Bonifazio (ITA)	Direct Énergie	s.t.
4	Lorrenzo Manzin (FRA)	Vital Concept–B&B Hotels	s.t.
5	André Greipel (GER)	Arkéa–Samsic	s.t.
6	Andrea Vendrame (ITA)	Androni Giocattoli–Sidermec	s.t.
7	Rohan du Plooy (RSA)	ProTouch Sports	s.t.
8	Henok Mulubrhan (ERI)	Eritrea	s.t.
9	Alessandro Bisolti (ITA)	Androni Giocattoli–Sidermec	s.t.
10	Issiaka Cissé (CIV)	Ivory Coast	s.t.

General classification after Stage 3

Rank	Rider	Team	Time
1	Niccolò Bonifazio (ITA)	Direct Énergie	9h 22' 31"
2	Sirak Tesfom (ERI)	Eritrea	+ 13"
3	André Greipel (GER)	Arkéa–Samsic	+ 14"
4	Youcef Reguigui (ALG)	Algeria	+ 17"
5	Didier Munyaneza (RWA)	Rwanda	s.t.
6	Lorrenzo Manzin (FRA)	Vital Concept–B&B Hotels	+ 18"
7	Metkel Eyob (ERI)	Eritrea	+ 19"
8	Henok Mulubrhan (ERI)	Eritrea	+ 21"
9	Daniel Teklehaimanot (ERI)	Eritrea	s.t.
10	Rohan du Plooy (RSA)	ProTouch Sports	+ 22"

=== Stage 4 ===
Stage 4 result

Rank	Rider	Team	Time
1	Lorrenzo Manzin (FRA)	Vital Concept–B&B Hotels	2h 35' 24"
2	Niccolò Bonifazio (ITA)	Direct Énergie	s.t.
3	Matteo Pelucchi (ITA)	Androni Giocattoli–Sidermec	s.t.
4	André Greipel (GER)	Arkéa–Samsic	s.t.
5	Youcef Reguigui (ALG)	Algeria	s.t.
6	Andrea Vendrame (ITA)	Androni Giocattoli–Sidermec	s.t.
7	Henok Mulubrhan (ERI)	Eritrea	s.t.
8	Metkel Eyob (ERI)	Eritrea	s.t.
9	Bonaventure Uwizeyimana (RWA)	Rwanda	s.t.
10	Rohan du Plooy (RSA)	ProTouch Sports	s.t.

General classification after Stage 4

Rank	Rider	Team	Time
1	Niccolò Bonifazio (ITA)	Direct Énergie	11h 57' 49"
2	Lorrenzo Manzin (FRA)	Vital Concept–B&B Hotels	+ 14"
3	Sirak Tesfom (ERI)	Eritrea	+ 16"
4	André Greipel (GER)	Arkéa–Samsic	+ 20"
5	Youcef Reguigui (ALG)	Algeria	+ 23"
6	Didier Munyaneza (RWA)	Rwanda	s.t.
7	Daniel Teklehaimanot (ERI)	Eritrea	+ 24"
8	Metkel Eyob (ERI)	Eritrea	+ 25"
9	Henok Mulubrhan (ERI)	Eritrea	+ 27"
10	Rohan du Plooy (RSA)	ProTouch Sports	+ 28"

=== Stage 5 ===
Stage 5 result

Rank	Rider	Team	Time
1	Niccolò Bonifazio (ITA)	Direct Énergie	3h 04' 51"
2	Youcef Reguigui (ALG)	Algeria	s.t.
3	Lorrenzo Manzin (FRA)	Vital Concept–B&B Hotels	s.t.
4	Matteo Pelucchi (ITA)	Androni Giocattoli–Sidermec	s.t.
5	Biniam Girmay (ERI)	Eritrea	s.t.
6	André Greipel (GER)	Arkéa–Samsic	s.t.
7	Rohan du Plooy (RSA)	ProTouch Sports	s.t.
8	Henok Mulubrhan (ERI)	Eritrea	s.t.
9	Andrea Vendrame (ITA)	Androni Giocattoli–Sidermec	s.t.
10	Alexandre Mayer (MRI)	Mauritius	s.t.

General classification after Stage 5

Rank	Rider	Team	Time
1	Niccolò Bonifazio (ITA)	Direct Énergie	15h 02' 30"
2	Lorrenzo Manzin (FRA)	Vital Concept–B&B Hotels	+ 20"
3	Sirak Tesfom (ERI)	Eritrea	+ 26"
4	Youcef Reguigui (ALG)	Algeria	+ 27"
5	Metkel Eyob (ERI)	Eritrea	+ 28"
6	André Greipel (GER)	Arkéa–Samsic	+ 30"
7	Didier Munyaneza (RWA)	Rwanda	+ 33"
8	Daniel Teklehaimanot (ERI)	Eritrea	+ 34"
9	Henok Mulubrhan (ERI)	Eritrea	+ 37"
10	Rohan du Plooy (RSA)	ProTouch Sports	+ 38"

=== Stage 6 ===
Stage 6 result

Rank	Rider	Team	Time
1	André Greipel (GER)	Arkéa–Samsic	2h 30' 54"
2	Youcef Reguigui (ALG)	Algeria	s.t.
3	Lorrenzo Manzin (FRA)	Vital Concept–B&B Hotels	s.t.
4	Matteo Pelucchi (ITA)	Androni Giocattoli–Sidermec	s.t.
5	Biniam Girmay (ERI)	Eritrea	s.t.
6	Maxime Cam (FRA)	Vital Concept–B&B Hotels	s.t.
7	Niccolò Bonifazio (ITA)	Direct Énergie	s.t.
8	Redwan Ebrahim (ETH)	Ethiopia	s.t.
9	Andrea Vendrame (ITA)	Androni Giocattoli–Sidermec	s.t.
10	Daniel Teklehaimanot (ERI)	Eritrea	s.t.

General classification after Stage 6

Rank	Rider	Team	Time
1	Niccolò Bonifazio (ITA)	Direct Énergie	17h 33' 24"
2	Lorrenzo Manzin (FRA)	Vital Concept–B&B Hotels	+ 16"
3	André Greipel (GER)	Arkéa–Samsic	+ 20"
4	Youcef Reguigui (ALG)	Algeria	+ 21"
5	Sirak Tesfom (ERI)	Eritrea	+ 26"
6	Metkel Eyob (ERI)	Eritrea	+ 28"
7	Didier Munyaneza (RWA)	Rwanda	+ 33"
8	Daniel Teklehaimanot (ERI)	Eritrea	+ 34"
9	Henok Mulubrhan (ERI)	Eritrea	+ 37"
10	Rohan du Plooy (RSA)	ProTouch Sports	+ 38"

=== Stage 7 ===
Stage 7 result

Rank	Rider	Team	Time
1	Lorrenzo Manzin (FRA)	Vital Concept–B&B Hotels	3h 06' 01"
2	André Greipel (GER)	Arkéa–Samsic	s.t.
3	Youcef Reguigui (ALG)	Algeria	s.t.
4	Biniam Girmay (ERI)	Eritrea	s.t.
5	Matteo Pelucchi (ITA)	Androni Giocattoli–Sidermec	s.t.
6	Henok Mulubrhan (ERI)	Eritrea	s.t.
7	Niccolò Bonifazio (ITA)	Direct Énergie	s.t.
8	Rohan du Plooy (RSA)	ProTouch Sports	s.t.
9	Bonaventure Uwizeyimana (RWA)	Rwanda	s.t.
10	Issiaka Cissé (CIV)	Ivory Coast	s.t.

== Classifications ==
Final general classification

Rank	Rider	Team	Time
1	Niccolò Bonifazio (ITA)	Direct Énergie	20h 39' 25"
2	Lorrenzo Manzin (FRA)	Vital Concept–B&B Hotels	+ 6"
3	André Greipel (GER)	Arkéa–Samsic	+ 14"
4	Youcef Reguigui (ALG)	Algeria	+ 17"
5	Sirak Tesfom (ERI)	Eritrea	+ 26"
6	Metkel Eyob (ERI)	Eritrea	+ 28"
7	Alessandro Bisolti (ITA)	Androni Giocattoli–Sidermec	+ 32"
8	Didier Munyaneza (RWA)	Rwanda	+ 33"
9	Daniel Teklehaimanot (ERI)	Eritrea	+ 34"
10	Henok Mulubrhan (ERI)	Eritrea	+ 37"

Final points classification

Rank	Rider	Team	Points
1	Niccolò Bonifazio (ITA)	Direct Énergie	176
2	André Greipel (GER)	Arkéa–Samsic	172
3	Lorrenzo Manzin (FRA)	Vital Concept–B&B Hotels	169
4	Youcef Reguigui (ALG)	Algeria	169
5	Andrea Vendrame (ITA)	Androni Giocattoli–Sidermec	102
6	Henok Mulubrhan (ERI)	Eritrea	99
7	Matteo Pelucchi (ITA)	Androni Giocattoli–Sidermec	92
8	Rohan du Plooy (RSA)	ProTouch Sports	90
9	Biniam Girmay (ERI)	Eritrea	68
10	Redwan Ebrahim (ETH)	Ethiopia	60

Final mountains classification

Rank	Rider	Team	Points
1	Sirak Tesfom (ERI)	Eritrea	21
2	Marco Frapporti (ITA)	Androni Giocattoli–Sidermec	18
3	Abderrahmane Mansouri (ALG)	Algeria	16
4	Samuel Mugisha (RWA)	Rwanda	12
5	Matteo Busato (ITA)	Androni Giocattoli–Sidermec	11
6	Didier Munyaneza (RWA)	Rwanda	11
7	Youcef Reguigui (ALG)	Algeria	8
8	Jayde Julius (RSA)	ProTouch Sports	8
9	Metkel Eyob (ERI)	Eritrea	7
10	Joseph Areruya (RWA)	Rwanda	7

Final young rider classification

Rank	Rider	Team	Time
1	Didier Munyaneza (RWA)	Rwanda	20h 39' 58"
2	Henok Mulubrhan (ERI)	Eritrea	+ 4"
3	Samuel Mugisha (RWA)	Rwanda	+ 7"
4	Redwan Ebrahim (ETH)	Ethiopia	+ 11"
5	Kibrom Teklebrhan Haylemaryam (ETH)	Ethiopia	s.t.
6	Corentin Ermenault (FRA)	Vital Concept–B&B Hotels	+ 13"
7	Joseph Areruya (RWA)	Rwanda	+ 20"
8	Dylan Redy (MRI)	Mauritius	+ 22"
9	Tamrat Meresa Gebrewahd (ETH)	Ethiopia	+ 40"
10	Alexandre Mayer (MRI)	Mauritius	+ 49"

Final teams classification

Rank	Team	Time
1	Eritrea	62h 00' 15"
2	Direct Énergie	+ 7"
3	Vital Concept–B&B Hotels	+ 10"
4	Androni Giocattoli–Sidermec	+ 11"
5	Rwanda	+ 12"

== Classification leadership table ==
Stage	Winner	General classification	Points classification	Mountains classification	Young rider classification	Team classification
1	Niccolò Bonifazio	Niccolò Bonifazio	Niccolò Bonifazio	Sirak Tesfom	Didier Munyaneza	Direct Énergie
2	Niccolò Bonifazio	Niccolò Bonifazio	Niccolò Bonifazio	Sirak Tesfom	Didier Munyaneza	Direct Énergie
3	Biniam Girmay	Niccolò Bonifazio	Niccolò Bonifazio	Sirak Tesfom	Didier Munyaneza	Direct Énergie
4	Lorrenzo Manzin	Niccolò Bonifazio	Niccolò Bonifazio	Sirak Tesfom	Didier Munyaneza	Eritrea
5	Niccolò Bonifazio	Niccolò Bonifazio	Niccolò Bonifazio	Sirak Tesfom	Didier Munyaneza	Eritrea
6	André Greipel	Niccolò Bonifazio	Niccolò Bonifazio	Sirak Tesfom	Didier Munyaneza	Eritrea
7	Lorrenzo Manzin	Niccolò Bonifazio	Niccolò Bonifazio	Sirak Tesfom	Didier Munyaneza	Eritrea
Final		Niccolò Bonifazio	Niccolò Bonifazio	Sirak Tesfom	Didier Munyaneza	Eritrea
