= Kent Main =

South African cyclist (born 1996)

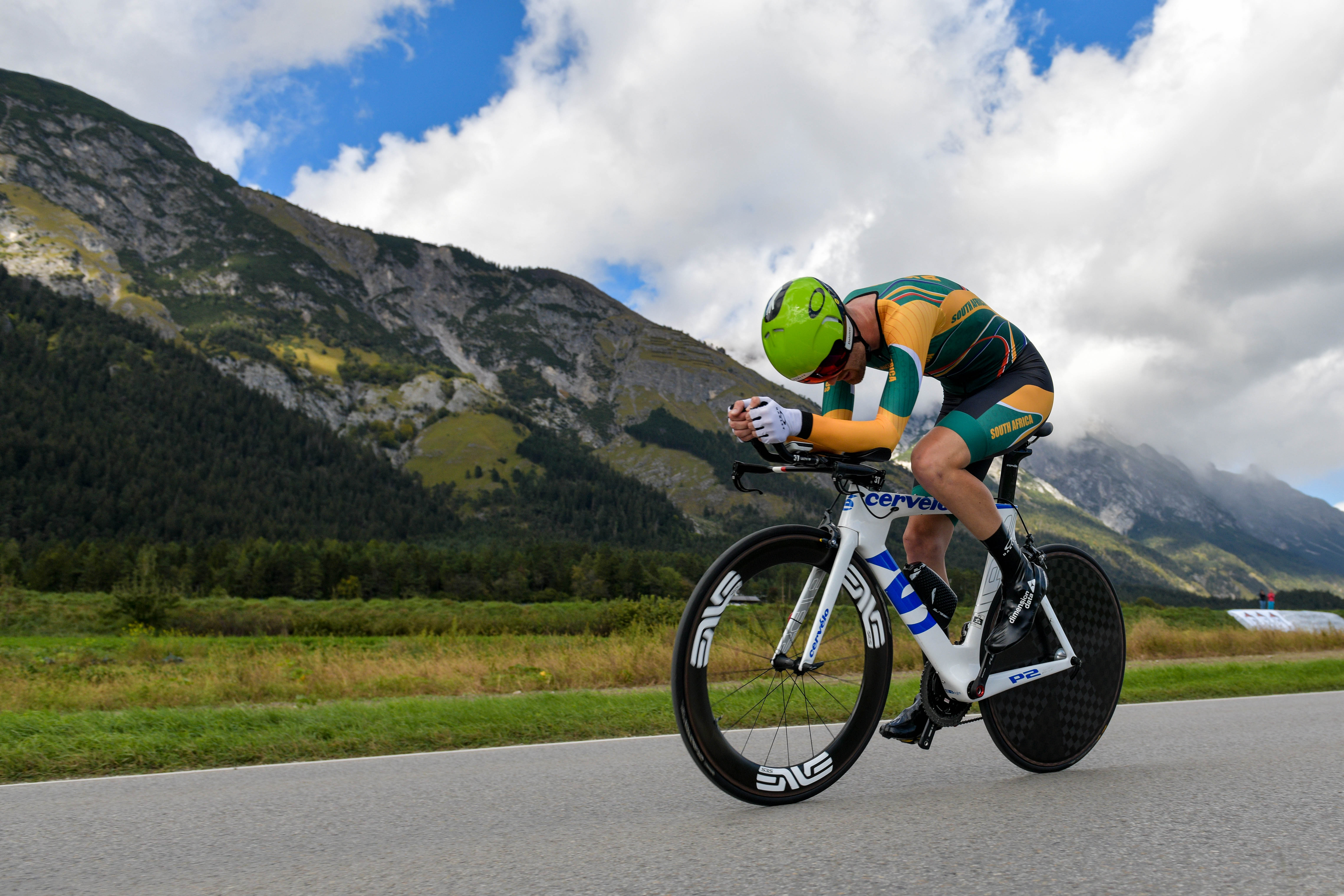
- Main riding in the under-23 time trial at the 2018 UCI Road World Championships

Personal information
- Full name: Kent Warwick Main
- Born: 8 January 1996 (age 30) Johannesburg, South Africa

Cycling career
- Sport: Cycling
- Current team: ProTouch
- Discipline: Road
- Role: Rider

Amateur teams
- 2011: Team EuropcarSA
- 2016–2017: Team RoadCover
- 2018: Team Dimension Data (stagiaire)

Professional teams
- 2017–2018: Dimension Data for Qhubeka
- 2019: TEG Pro Cycling Team
- 2019–: ProTouch

Kent Warwick Main (born 8 January 1996) is a South African cyclist, who currently rides for UCI Continental team ProTouch.

== Major results ==
2014
3rd Road race, National Junior Road Championships
2017
1st Overall Tour of Good Hope

1st Stage 3

2018
2nd Time trial, National Under-23 Road Championships
2nd Overall Tour of Good Hope

1st Stage 3

2019
African Games

1st Team time trial
2nd Time trial

2nd Overall Tour de Limpopo
4th Time trial, National Road Championships
6th Overall Tour of Iran (Azerbaijan)
9th Overall Tour of Good Hope
2020
3rd Time trial, National Road Championships
3rd Overall Tour du Rwanda
2021
African Road Championships

1st Team time trial
1st Mixed team relay
2nd Time trial

National Road Championships

3rd Time trial
4th Road race

10th Overall Tour du Rwanda
2022
2nd Team time trial, African Road Championships
National Road Championships

2nd Time trial
4th Road race

7th Overall Tour du Rwanda
1st Stage 4
2024
1st Cape Town Cycle Tour
