= Reynard Butler =

South African cyclist

Personal information
- Born: 3 April 1989 (age 37) East London, Eastern Cape, South Africa

Cycling career
- Sport: Cycling
- Discipline: Road
- Role: Rider
- Rider type: Sprinter

Amateur teams
- 2011: Marco Polo (stagiaire)
- 2014–2015: Team Abantu
- 2016: Team Telkom
- 2017: Team BCX
- 2018: Team Pro Touch

Professional team
- 2019–2021: ProTouch

Reynard Butler (born 3 April 1989) is a South African cyclist, who most recently rode for UCI Continental team ProTouch.

== Major results ==
2010
2nd Road race, National Under-23 Road Championships
2015
1st Team time trial, African Games
1st PMB Road Classic, KZN Autumn Series
2016
Tour Ethiopian Meles Zenawi

1st Stages 3 & 5

1st Stage 4 Tour of Good Hope
2017
1st Stage 3 Mpumalanga Tour
2018
1st Stage 3 (TTT) Tour de Limpopo
4th Road race, National Road Championships
2019
1st Stage 4 Tour of China II
4th 100 Cycle Challenge
