= Steven van Heerden =

South African racing cyclist

Personal information
- Full name: Steven van Heerden
- Born: 6 August 1993 (age 33) Kempton Park, South Africa

Cycling career
- Sport: Cycling
- Current team: Team Enza
- Disciplines: Track; Road
- Role: Rider

Amateur teams
- 2017–2018: BCX
- 2019: Team VanderGroup
- 2021–: Team Enza

Professional team
- 2019–2020: ProTouch

Steven van Heerden (born 6 August 1993) is a South African racing cyclist, who currently rides for South African amateur team Enza.

== Major results ==
2015
African Track Championships

1st Team pursuit
1st Madison

1st Team pursuit, National Track Championships (with Jac-Johann Steyn, Jared Poulton and Jean Spies)
2016
1st Individual pursuit, National Track Championships
2017
African Track Championships

1st Team pursuit (with Nolan Hoffman, Jean Spies and Joshua van Wyk)
1st Individual pursuit
1st Points race
1st Madison (with Nolan Hoffman)

1st Points race, National Track Championships
2018
African Track Championships

1st Team pursuit (with Gert Fouche, Jean Spies and Joshua van Wyk)
1st Points race
2nd Scratch
3rd Individual pursuit

1st Stage 4 Tour de Limpopo
2019
African Track Championships

1st Madison (with Joshua van Wyk)
2nd Omnium
