= Brandon Downes =

South African bicycle racer

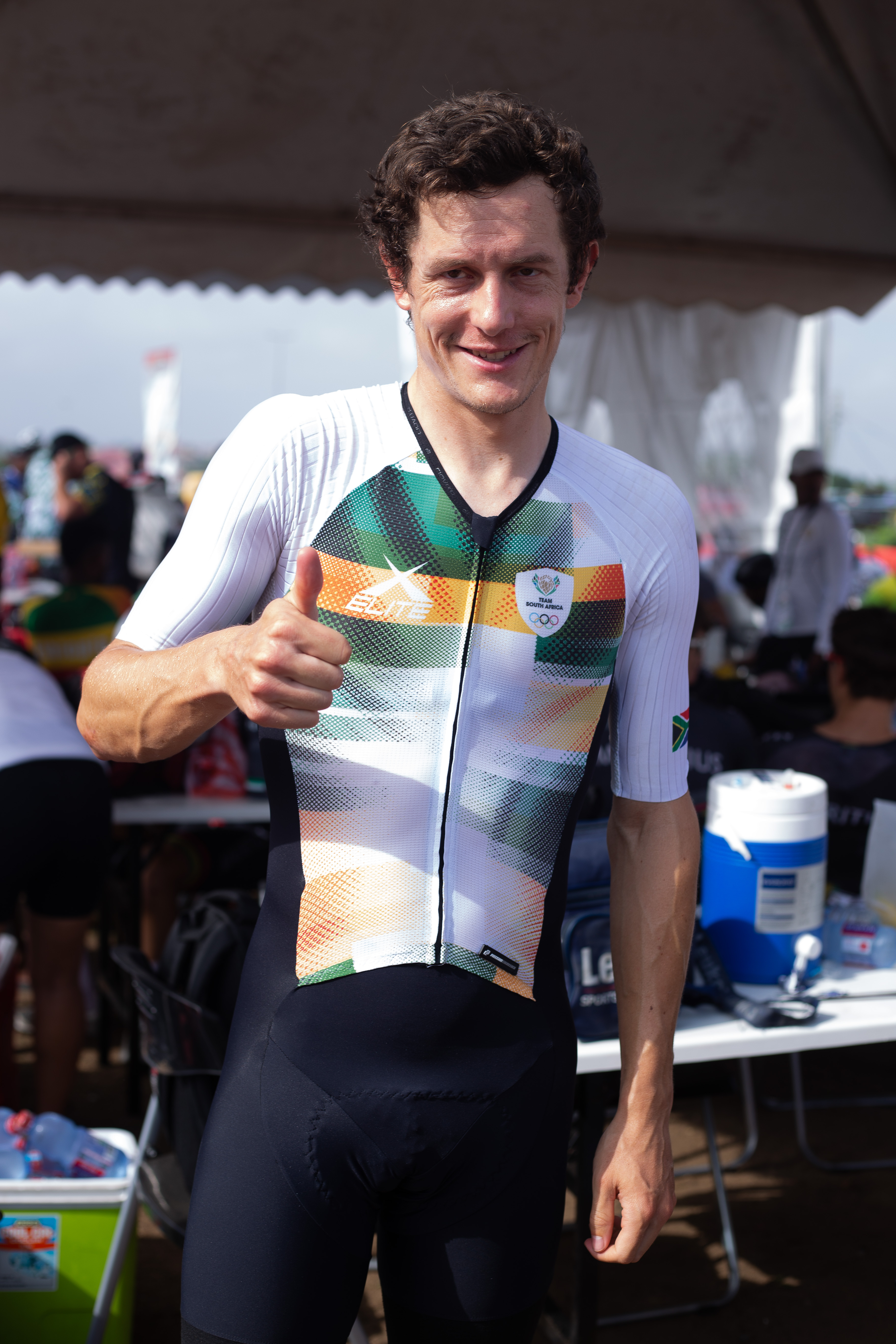
- Downes in 2024

Personal information
- Born: 12 March 1991 (age 35) Johannesburg, South Africa

Cycling career
- Sport: Cycling
- Current team: Melon Mobile RealPay Pro Cycling
- Discipline: Road
- Role: Rider

Amateur teams
- 2017: Luso Pro Cycling
- 2017: Karan Beef
- 2018: Team BCX
- 2018: Team Martigues SC–Drag Bicycles
- 2020–2024: TEG Pro Cycling Team
- 2025–: Melon Mobile RealPay Pro Cycling

Professional team
- 2019: TEG Pro Cycling Team

Brandon Downes (born 12 March 1991) is a South African cyclist, who currently rides for club team Melon Mobile RealPay Pro Cycling.

Before pursuing cycling, Downes studied at the University of the Witwatersrand, where he earned a degree in architecture while playing amateur hockey.

== Major results ==
2018
1st 947 Cycle Challenge
2019
4th GP Al Massira, Les Challenges de la Marche Verte
2020
2nd Tour of Good Hope
5th Time trial, National Road Championships
2021
1st Overall Mpumalanga Tour

1st Stage 2

1st Overall Tour du Cap
2022
1st Overall Tour du Cap

1st Stage 2

2nd Overall Tour de Windhoek
3rd Time trial, National Road Championships
3rd Overall Mpumalanga Tour
2023
2nd Overall Tour du Cap

1st Stage 1

3rd Overall Tour de Windhoek

1st Prologue & Stages 1 & 4

2024
African Road Championships

2nd Time trial
5th Road race

African Games

2nd Mixed relay
2nd Team time trial
3rd Time trial

2nd Overall Tour de Windhoek

1st Stage 2 (ITT)

2nd Overall Panorama Tour

1st Stages 1 & 4

2025
1st Tour de Limpopo
2nd Overall Tour du Cap

1st Stage 2

3rd Time trial, National Road Championships
