= Gustav Basson =

South African cyclist (born 1996)

Personal information
- Full name: Gustav Basson
- Born: 23 February 1996 (age 30) Nelspruit, South Africa

Cycling career
- Sport: Cycling
- Current team: Team DMS Pro Cycling
- Discipline: Road
- Role: Rider

Amateur teams
- 2015: WCCA Feeder
- 2016: Verandas Willems–Crabbé Toitures–CC Chevigny
- 2017: Home Solutions–Anmapa–Soenens
- 2017–2018: Team Pro Touch
- 2018: Baqué–Ideus–BH
- 2023–: Team DMS Pro Cycling

Professional teams
- 2019: TEG Pro Cycling Team
- 2020–2022: ProTouch

Major wins
- Single-day races and Classics African Time Trial Championships (2022)
Medal record
Men's road cycling
Representing South Africa
African Road Championships
Gold medal – first place	2022 Sharm El Sheikh	Time trial

Gustav Basson (born 23 February 1996) is a South African cyclist, who currently rides for South African team Team DMS Pro Cycling.

== Major results ==
2014
1st Time trial, National Junior Road Championships
2015
African Games

1st Team time trial
2nd Time trial

3rd Time trial, National Under-23 Road Championships
KZN Autumn Series

6th PMB Road Classic
6th Hibiscus Cycle Classic

2018
1st Overall Tour de Limpopo

1st Young rider classification
1st Stages 1 & 3 (TTT)

3rd Road race, National Under-23 Road Championships
5th 100 Cycle Challenge
African Road Championships

10th Road race
10th Time trial

2019
1st Overall Challenge International du Sahara Marocain

1st Points classification
1st Stage 3

Les Challenges de la Marche Verte

1st GP Al Massira
4th GP Oued Eddahab

1st Stage 2 Tour of Good Hope
1st Stage 1 Tour de Limpopo
9th 100 Cycle Challenge
2021
African Road Championships

1st Mixed team relay
1st Team time trial

1st Stage 10 Tour du Faso
5th Time trial, National Road Championships
2022
African Road Championships

1st Time trial
2nd Team time trial
5th Road race

1st Stage 3 Tour of Sakarya
5th Grand Prix Cappadocia
5th Grand Prix Develi
