= Clint Hendricks =

South African cyclist (born 1991)

Personal information
- Full name: Clint Hendricks
- Born: 26 September 1991 (age 35) Paarl, South Africa

Cycling career
- Sport: Cycling
- Current team: Team Enza
- Discipline: Road
- Role: Rider

Amateur team
- 2021–: Team Enza

Professional teams
- 2018: Bike Aid
- 2019: ProTouch
- 2020: Bike Aid
Medal record
Men's road cycling
Representing South Africa
Commonwealth Games
Bronze medal – third place	2018 Gold Coast	Road race

Clint Hendricks (born 26 September 1991) is a South African racing cyclist, who currently rides for South African amateur team Enza. He competed in the men's road race event at the 2018 Commonwealth Games, winning the bronze medal.

== Major results ==
2015
5th Hibiscus Cycle Classic, KZN Autumn Series
2016
4th Road race, National Road Championships
2017
5th Overall Tour of Eritrea
6th Massawa Circuit
6th Fenkil Northern Red Sea Challenge
2018
1st Stage 6 Tour de Singkarak
3rd Road race, Commonwealth Games
3rd Overall Tour de Limpopo

1st Points classification

6th 100 Cycle Challenge
2019
Challenge du Prince

2nd Trophée Princier
3rd Trophée de l'Anniversaire

5th Overall Tour of Good Hope
6th 100 Cycle Challenge
7th Road race, African Games
9th Overall Tour de Limpopo

1st Stage 4

2021
9th Road race, African Road Championships
