= Jacqueline Martin =

Jacqueline Martin may refer to:

- Jackie Martin (cyclist) (born 1971), road cyclist from South Africa
- Jacqueline Briggs Martin, American author of children's literature
