= Joshua van Wyk =

South African cyclist (born 1998)

Personal information
- Born: 14 October 1998 (age 28) Boksburg, South Africa

Cycling career
- Sport: Cycling
- Current team: Team ENZA
- Disciplines: Track and road
- Role: Rider

Amateur teams
- 2018: Cycle Power
- 2019: Office Guru

Joshua van Wyk (born 14 October 1998) is a South African racing cyclist.

== Major results ==
2015
1st Individual pursuit, African Junior Track Championships
Junior National Track Championships

1st Individual pursuit
1st Team pursuit
1st Scratch

2016
Junior National Track Championships

1st Keirin
1st Team pursuit

2017
1st Team pursuit, African Track Championships (with Nolan Hoffman, Steven van Heerden and Jean Spies)
1st Team pursuit, National Track Championships (with Gert Fouche, Bradley Gouveris and Jean Spies)
2018
African Track Championships

1st Team pursuit (with Jean Spies, Steven van Heerden and Gert Fouche)
3rd Points race

2019
African Track Championships

1st Points race
1st Madison (with Steven van Heerden)
1st Omnium
2nd Scratch

1st Scratch, National Track Championships
1st Stage 3 (TTT) Tour of Good Hope
2020
African Track Championships

1st Team sprint
1st Madison (with Steven van Heerden)
1st Scratch
