= 2022 Tour de la Provence =

French cycling race

2022 UCI ProSeries

Race details
- Dates: 10–13 February 2022
- Stages: 3 + Prologue
- Distance: 505.7 km (314.2 mi)
- Winning time: 12h 09' 11"

Results
Jersey awarded to the overall winner	Winner	Nairo Quintana (COL)	(Arkéa–Samsic)
	Second	Julian Alaphilippe (FRA)	(Quick-Step Alpha Vinyl Team)
	Third	Mattias Skjelmose Jensen (DEN)	(Trek–Segafredo)
Jersey awarded to the points classification winner	Points	Julian Alaphilippe (FRA)	(Quick-Step Alpha Vinyl Team)
Jersey awarded to the mountains classification winner	Mountains	Nairo Quintana (COL)	(Arkéa–Samsic)
Jersey awarded to the youth classification winner	Youth	Mattias Skjelmose Jensen (DEN)	(Trek–Segafredo)
	Team	Quick-Step Alpha Vinyl Team	

The 2022 Tour de la Provence was a road cycling stage race that took place between 10 and 13 February 2022 in the French region of Provence. The race was rated as a category 2.Pro event on the 2022 UCI ProSeries calendar, and was the seventh edition of the Tour de la Provence.

== Teams ==
11 of the 18 UCI WorldTeams, three UCI ProTeams, and three UCI Continental teams made up the 17 teams that participated in the race. Only six teams entered a full squad of seven riders each; eight teams entered six riders each, while the remaining three teams entered five riders each. In total, 105 riders started the race, of which 91 finished.

UCI WorldTeams

- AG2R Citroën Team
- Astana Qazaqstan Team
- Cofidis
- Groupama–FDJ
- Ineos Grenadiers
- Israel–Premier Tech
- Lotto–Soudal
- Movistar Team
- Quick-Step Alpha Vinyl Team
- Team DSM
- Trek–Segafredo

UCI ProTeams

- Arkéa–Samsic
- B&B Hotels–KTM
- Team TotalEnergies

UCI Continental Teams

- Go Sport–Roubaix–Lille Métropole
- Nice Métropole Côte d'Azur
- St. Michel–Auber93

== Route ==
Stage characteristics and winners
Stage	Date	Course	Distance	Type	Stage winner
P	10 February	Berre-l'Étang	7.1 km (4.4 mi)	Individual time trial	Filippo Ganna (ITA)
1	11 February	Istres to Les Saintes-Maries-de-la-Mer	152 km (94 mi)	Flat stage	Elia Viviani (ITA)
2	12 February	Arles to Manosque	180.5 km (112.2 mi)	Hilly stage	Bryan Coquard (FRA)
3	13 February	Manosque to Montagne de Lure	166.1 km (103.2 mi)	Mountain stage	Nairo Quintana (COL)
Total			505.7 km (314.2 mi)		

== Stages ==
=== Prologue ===
10 February 2022 – Berre-l'Étang, 7.1 km (4.4 mi) (ITT)

Prologue Result (1–10)
Rank	Rider	Team	Time
1	Filippo Ganna (ITA)	Ineos Grenadiers	8' 04"
2	Ethan Hayter (GBR)	Ineos Grenadiers	+ 12"
3	Tobias Ludvigsson (SWE)	Groupama–FDJ	+ 13"
4	Samuele Battistella (ITA)	Astana Qazaqstan Team	+ 15"
5	Pierre Latour (FRA)	Team TotalEnergies	+ 15"
6	Julian Alaphilippe (FRA)	Quick-Step Alpha Vinyl Team	+ 17"
7	Maciej Bodnar (POL)	Team TotalEnergies	+ 17"
8	Mathias Norsgaard (DEN)	Movistar Team	+ 19"
9	Dries Devenyns (BEL)	Quick-Step Alpha Vinyl Team	+ 19"
10	Ilan Van Wilder (BEL)	Quick-Step Alpha Vinyl Team	+ 20"

General classification after Prologue (1–10)
Rank	Rider	Team	Time
1	Filippo Ganna (ITA)	Ineos Grenadiers	8' 04"
2	Ethan Hayter (GBR)	Ineos Grenadiers	+ 12"
3	Tobias Ludvigsson (SWE)	Groupama–FDJ	+ 13"
4	Samuele Battistella (ITA)	Astana Qazaqstan Team	+ 15"
5	Pierre Latour (FRA)	Team TotalEnergies	+ 15"
6	Julian Alaphilippe (FRA)	Quick-Step Alpha Vinyl Team	+ 17"
7	Maciej Bodnar (POL)	Team TotalEnergies	+ 17"
8	Mathias Norsgaard (DEN)	Movistar Team	+ 19"
9	Dries Devenyns (BEL)	Quick-Step Alpha Vinyl Team	+ 19"
10	Ilan Van Wilder (BEL)	Quick-Step Alpha Vinyl Team	+ 20"

=== Stage 1 ===
11 February 2022 – Istres to Les Saintes-Maries-de-la-Mer, 152 km (94 mi)

Stage 1 Result (1–10)
Rank	Rider	Team	Time
1	Elia Viviani (ITA)	Ineos Grenadiers	3h 17' 58"
2	Sep Vanmarcke (BEL)	Israel–Premier Tech	+ 0"
3	Julian Alaphilippe (FRA)	Quick-Step Alpha Vinyl Team	+ 0"
4	Martijn Tusveld (NED)	Team DSM	+ 0"
5	Samuele Battistella (ITA)	Astana Qazaqstan Team	+ 0"
6	Cédric Beullens (BEL)	Lotto–Soudal	+ 0"
7	Mattias Skjelmose Jensen (DEN)	Trek–Segafredo	+ 0"
8	Pierre Latour (FRA)	Team TotalEnergies	+ 0"
9	Matteo Jorgenson (USA)	Movistar Team	+ 0"
10	Ilan Van Wilder (BEL)	Quick-Step Alpha Vinyl Team	+ 0"

General classification after Stage 1 (1–10)
Rank	Rider	Team	Time
1	Filippo Ganna (ITA)	Ineos Grenadiers	3h 26' 05"
2	Julian Alaphilippe (FRA)	Quick-Step Alpha Vinyl Team	+ 4"
3	Pierre Latour (FRA)	Team TotalEnergies	+ 10"
4	Samuele Battistella (ITA)	Astana Qazaqstan Team	+ 12"
5	Ilan Van Wilder (BEL)	Quick-Step Alpha Vinyl Team	+ 17"
6	Mattias Skjelmose Jensen (DEN)	Trek–Segafredo	+ 21"
7	Matteo Jorgenson (USA)	Movistar Team	+ 21"
8	Louis Vervaeke (BEL)	Quick-Step Alpha Vinyl Team	+ 21"
9	Sep Vanmarcke (BEL)	Israel–Premier Tech	+ 22"
10	Maxime Bouet (FRA)	Arkéa–Samsic	+ 23"

=== Stage 2 ===
12 February 2022 – Arles to Manosque, 180.5 km (112.2 mi)

Stage 2 Result (1–10)
Rank	Rider	Team	Time
1	Bryan Coquard (FRA)	Cofidis	4h 19' 42"
2	Julian Alaphilippe (FRA)	Quick-Step Alpha Vinyl Team	+ 0"
3	Filippo Ganna (ITA)	Ineos Grenadiers	+ 0"
4	Pierre Latour (FRA)	Team TotalEnergies	+ 0"
5	Arnaud Démare (FRA)	Groupama–FDJ	+ 0"
6	Nairo Quintana (COL)	Arkéa–Samsic	+ 0"
7	Mads Würtz Schmidt (DEN)	Israel–Premier Tech	+ 0"
8	Matteo Jorgenson (USA)	Movistar Team	+ 0"
9	Aurélien Paret-Peintre (FRA)	AG2R Citroën Team	+ 0"
10	Lorrenzo Manzin (FRA)	Team TotalEnergies	+ 0"

General classification after Stage 2 (1–10)
Rank	Rider	Team	Time
1	Filippo Ganna (ITA)	Ineos Grenadiers	7h 45' 43"
2	Julian Alaphilippe (FRA)	Quick-Step Alpha Vinyl Team	+ 2"
3	Pierre Latour (FRA)	Team TotalEnergies	+ 14"
4	Samuele Battistella (ITA)	Astana Qazaqstan Team	+ 16"
5	Mattias Skjelmose Jensen (DEN)	Trek–Segafredo	+ 25"
6	Matteo Jorgenson (USA)	Movistar Team	+ 25"
7	Maxime Bouet (FRA)	Arkéa–Samsic	+ 27"
8	Ilan Van Wilder (BEL)	Quick-Step Alpha Vinyl Team	+ 27"
9	Damien Touzé (FRA)	AG2R Citroën Team	+ 30"
10	Nairo Quintana (COL)	Arkéa–Samsic	+ 32"

=== Stage 3 ===
13 February 2022 – Manosque to Montagne de Lure, 166.1 km (103.2 mi)

Stage 3 Result (1–10)
Rank	Rider	Team	Time
1	Nairo Quintana (COL)	Arkéa–Samsic	4h 23' 06"
2	Mattias Skjelmose Jensen (DEN)	Trek–Segafredo	+ 37"
3	Matteo Jorgenson (USA)	Movistar Team	+ 37"
4	Iván Sosa (COL)	Movistar Team	+ 39"
5	Ilan Van Wilder (BEL)	Quick-Step Alpha Vinyl Team	+ 41"
6	Amanuel Ghebreigzabhier (ERI)	Trek–Segafredo	+ 46"
7	Julian Alaphilippe (FRA)	Quick-Step Alpha Vinyl Team	+ 47"
8	Pierre Latour (FRA)	Team TotalEnergies	+ 50"
9	Kenny Elissonde (FRA)	Trek–Segafredo	+ 1' 00"
10	Geoffrey Bouchard (FRA)	AG2R Citroën Team	+ 1' 03"

General classification after Stage 3 (1–10)
Rank	Rider	Team	Time
1	Nairo Quintana (COL)	Arkéa–Samsic	12h 09' 11"
2	Julian Alaphilippe (FRA)	Quick-Step Alpha Vinyl Team	+ 27"
3	Mattias Skjelmose Jensen (DEN)	Trek–Segafredo	+ 34"
4	Matteo Jorgenson (USA)	Movistar Team	+ 36"
5	Pierre Latour (FRA)	Team TotalEnergies	+ 42"
6	Ilan Van Wilder (BEL)	Quick-Step Alpha Vinyl Team	+ 46"
7	Samuele Battistella (ITA)	Astana Qazaqstan Team	+ 1' 21"
8	Aurélien Paret-Peintre (FRA)	AG2R Citroën Team	+ 1' 45"
9	Maxime Bouet (FRA)	Arkéa–Samsic	+ 1' 56"
10	Louis Vervaeke (BEL)	Quick-Step Alpha Vinyl Team	+ 2' 55"

== Classification leadership table ==
Classification leadership by stage
Stage	Winner	General classification	Points classification	Mountains classification	Young rider classification	Team classification	People's Favourite award
P	Filippo Ganna	Filippo Ganna	Not awarded	Not awarded	Ethan Hayter	Ineos Grenadiers	Arnaud Démare
1	Elia Viviani	Filippo Ganna	Julian Alaphilippe	Tom Mainguenaud	Samuele Battistella	Ineos Grenadiers	Tristan Delacroix
2	Bryan Coquard	Filippo Ganna	Julian Alaphilippe	Paul Ourselin	Samuele Battistella	Quick-Step Alpha Vinyl Team	Aurélien Paret-Peintre
3	Nairo Quintana	Nairo Quintana	Julian Alaphilippe	Nairo Quintana	Mattias Skjelmose Jensen	Quick-Step Alpha Vinyl Team	Julian Alaphilippe
Final		Nairo Quintana	Julian Alaphilippe	Nairo Quintana	Mattias Skjelmose Jensen	Quick-Step Alpha Vinyl Team	Not awarded

- On stage 1, as per race regulations, Tobias Ludvigsson and Samuele Battistella, who were the next two best-placed riders in the general classification not already leading a classification after the prologue, wore the yellow and blue polka-dot jerseys, respectively. However, neither rider was deemed to be officially leading those respective classifications, as no points had been awarded on the prologue for either classification.

== Final classification standings ==
Legend
Denotes the winner of the general classification	Denotes the winner of the young rider classification
Denotes the winner of the points classification	Denotes the winner of the People's Favourite award
Denotes the winner of the mountains classification	

=== General classification ===
Final general classification (1–10) (Note: Ineos Grenadiers rider Filippo Ganna, who began the stage as the race leader, finished 12th on stage 4 and was originally placed seventh in the final general classification. However, he was later disqualified for an illegal bike change.)
Rank	Rider	Team	Time
1	Nairo Quintana (COL)	Arkéa–Samsic	12h 09' 11"
2	Julian Alaphilippe (FRA)	Quick-Step Alpha Vinyl Team	+ 27"
3	Mattias Skjelmose Jensen (DEN)	Trek–Segafredo	+ 34"
4	Matteo Jorgenson (USA)	Movistar Team	+ 36"
5	Pierre Latour (FRA)	Team TotalEnergies	+ 42"
6	Ilan Van Wilder (BEL)	Quick-Step Alpha Vinyl Team	+ 46"
7	Samuele Battistella (ITA)	Astana Qazaqstan Team	+ 1' 21"
8	Aurélien Paret-Peintre (FRA)	AG2R Citroën Team	+ 1' 45"
9	Maxime Bouet (FRA)	Arkéa–Samsic	+ 1' 56"
10	Louis Vervaeke (BEL)	Quick-Step Alpha Vinyl Team	+ 2' 55"

=== Points classification ===
Final points classification (1–10)
Rank	Rider	Team	Points
1	Julian Alaphilippe (FRA)	Quick-Step Alpha Vinyl Team	34
2	Pierre Latour (FRA)	Team TotalEnergies	18
3	Nairo Quintana (COL)	Arkéa–Samsic	17
4	Elia Viviani (ITA)	Ineos Grenadiers	15
5	Matteo Jorgenson (USA)	Movistar Team	15
6	Mattias Skjelmose Jensen (DEN)	Trek–Segafredo	14
7	Sep Vanmarcke (BEL)	Israel–Premier Tech	12
8	Martijn Tusveld (NED)	Team DSM	9
9	Samuele Battistella (ITA)	Astana Qazaqstan Team	8
10	Arnaud Démare (FRA)	Groupama–FDJ	8

=== Mountains classification ===
Final mountains classification (1–10)
Rank	Rider	Team	Points
1	Nairo Quintana (COL)	Arkéa–Samsic	10
2	Paul Ourselin (FRA)	Team TotalEnergies	8
3	Mattias Skjelmose Jensen (DEN)	Trek–Segafredo	8
4	Matteo Jorgenson (USA)	Movistar Team	6
5	Kévin Besson (FRA)	Nice Métropole Côte d'Azur	5
6	Iván Sosa (COL)	Movistar Team	4
7	Tom Mainguenaud (FRA)	Go Sport–Roubaix–Lille Métropole	2
8	Ilan Van Wilder (BEL)	Quick-Step Alpha Vinyl Team	2
9	Amanuel Ghebreigzabhier (ERI)	Trek–Segafredo	1
10	Tristan Delacroix (FRA)	Nice Métropole Côte d'Azur	1

=== Young rider classification ===
Final young rider classification (1–10)
Rank	Rider	Team	Time
1	Mattias Skjelmose Jensen (DEN)	Trek–Segafredo	12h 09' 45"
2	Matteo Jorgenson (USA)	Movistar Team	+ 2"
3	Ilan Van Wilder (BEL)	Quick-Step Alpha Vinyl Team	+ 12"
4	Samuele Battistella (ITA)	Astana Qazaqstan Team	+ 47"
5	Mark Donovan (GBR)	Team DSM	+ 12' 16"
6	Andréa Mifsud (FRA)	Nice Métropole Côte d'Azur	+ 13' 03"
7	Viktor Verschaeve (BEL)	Lotto–Soudal	+ 13' 11"
8	Joris Delbove (FRA)	St. Michel–Auber93	+ 13' 56"
9	Valentin Ferron (FRA)	Team TotalEnergies	+ 14' 30"
10	Tom Mainguenaud (FRA)	Go Sport–Roubaix–Lille Métropole	+ 15' 37"

=== Team classification ===
Final team classification (1–10)
Rank	Team	Time
1	Quick-Step Alpha Vinyl Team	36h 31' 55"
2	Arkéa–Samsic	+ 1' 33"
3	AG2R Citroën Team	+ 11' 09"
4	Team TotalEnergies	+ 14' 22"
5	Israel–Premier Tech	+ 16' 26"
6	Trek–Segafredo	+ 17' 28"
7	Movistar Team	+ 20' 32"
8	Team DSM	+ 23' 01"
9	Ineos Grenadiers	+ 24' 04"
10	Astana Qazaqstan Team	+ 31' 10"
