= TEG Pro Cycling =

Team information
- UCI code: TEG
- Registered: South Africa
- Founded: 2019
- Status: UCI Continental (2019–)
- Website: Team home page

Team name history
- 2019–: TEG Pro Cycling

TEG Pro Cycling is a South African UCI Continental road cycling team. The team was established in 2018 in preparation for the 2019 season.

== Team roster ==
Rider	Date of birth
Gustav Basson (RSA)	23 February 1996 (age 30)
Brandon Downes (RSA)	12 March 1991 (age 35)
Ryan Harris (RSA)	13 March 1998 (age 28)
Jason Oosthuizen (RSA)	5 May 1999 (age 27)
Louis Visser (RSA)	28 September 1998 (age 27)

== Major results ==
2019
Stage 2 Tour of Good Hope, Gustav Basson
Stage 1 Tour de Limpopo, Gustav Basson
Les Challenges de la Marche Verte – GP Oued Eddahab, Jason Oosthuizen
Les Challenges de la Marche Verte – GP Al Massira, Gustav Basson
Overall Challenge International du Sahara Marocain, Gustav Basson

Stage 2, Jason Oosthuizen
Stage 3, Gustav Basson
