= Nolan Hoffman =

South African cyclist (born 1985)

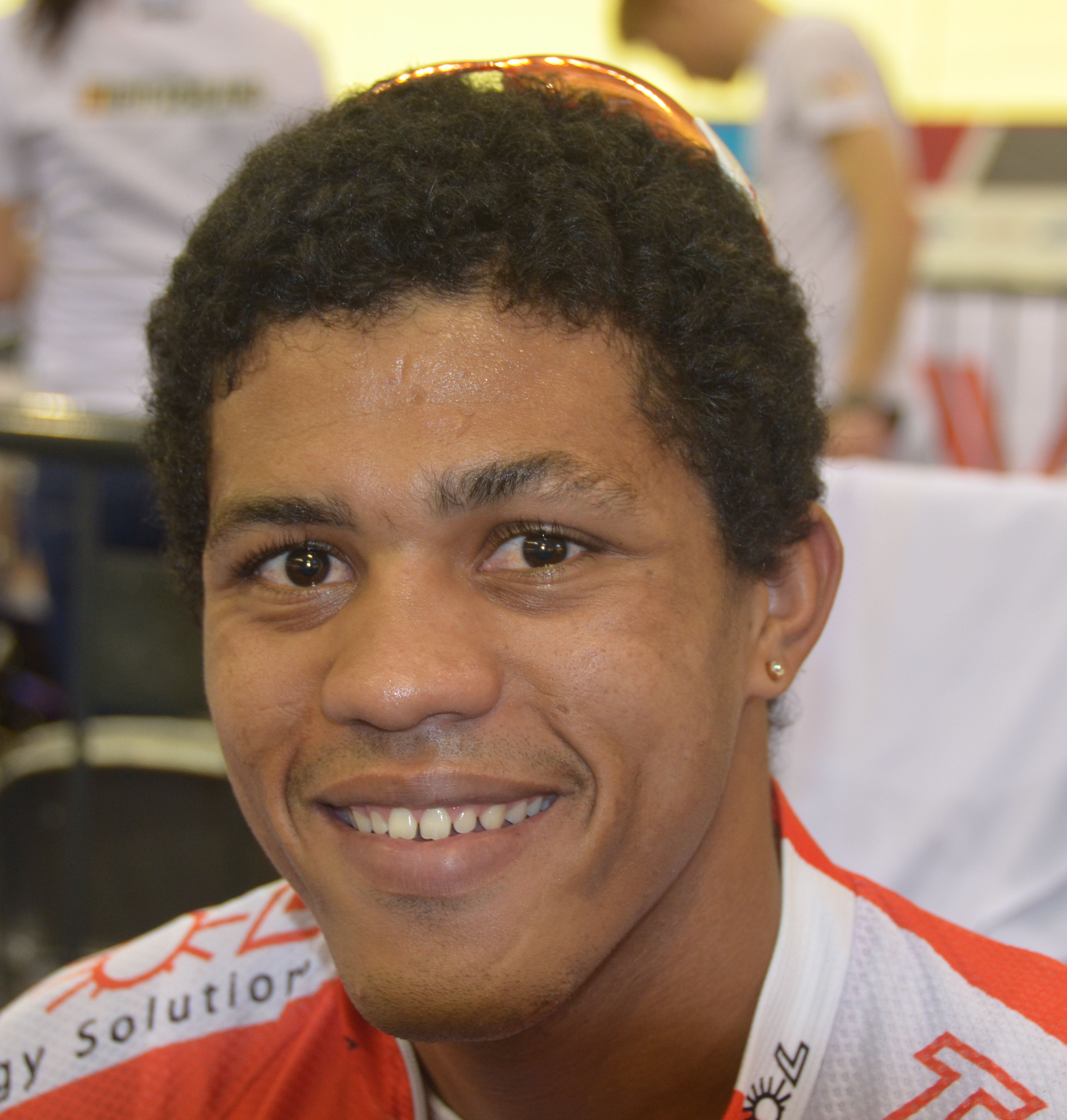

Personal information
- Born: 23 April 1985 (age 41) Franschhoek, South Africa

Cycling career
- Sport: Cycling
- Current team: Team Enza
- Disciplines: Road; Track
- Role: Rider
- Rider type: Sprinter

Amateur teams
- 2014–2015: Team Abantu
- 2016: Telkom
- 2017–2018: BCX
- 2019–: Team Enza

Professional teams
- 2005: Team Exel
- 2008–2009: Team Neotel
- 2019: Team VanderGroup

Nolan Hoffman (born 23 April 1985) is a South African road and track cyclist, who currently rides for South African team Enza. He was suspended for eighteen months after he tested positive for the use of testosterone on 18 October 2009. He competed in the scratch event at the UCI Track Cycling World Championships in 2012, 2013 and 2014, winning the silver medal in 2012.

== Major results ==
2005
1st Stage 3 (TTT) Tour d'Egypte
2007
5th Road race, African Road Championships
2008
1st Powerade Dome 2 Dome Cycling Spectacular
4th Overall Tour de Korea

1st Stage 9

2009
1st Stage 1 Tour de Korea
3rd Giro del Capo IV
2011
All-Africa Games

1st Road race
1st Team time trial (with Jay Thomson, Reinardt Janse van Rensburg and Darren Lill)

2012
2nd Scratch, UCI Track Cycling World Championships
2014
1st Cape Town Cycle Tour
1st Points classification Mzansi Tour
2015
1st Cape Town Cycle Tour
KZN Autumn Series

8th Mayday Classic
10th PMB Road Classic

2018
1st 100 Cycle Challenge
1st Cape Town Cycle Tour
3rd Road race, National Road Championships
2019
Tour of Good Hope

1st Points classification
1st Stage 1

3rd 100 Cycle Challenge
2021
1st Cape Town Cycle Tour
