= 2012 UCI Track Cycling World Championships – Men's scratch =

Rainbow jersey

The men's scratch at the 2012 UCI Track Cycling World Championships was held on April 4. Twenty-one athletes participated in the scratch race. The competition consisted of 60 laps, making a total of 15 km.

== Medalists ==
Gold	Ben Swift (GBR)
Silver	Nolan Hoffman (RSA)
Bronze	Wim Stroetinga (NED)

== Results ==
The race was held at 20:35.

Rank	Name	Nation	Laps down
1st place, gold medalist(s)	Ben Swift	United Kingdom	
2nd place, silver medalist(s)	Nolan Hoffman	South Africa	
3rd place, bronze medalist(s)	Wim Stroetinga	Netherlands	
4	Alex Frame	New Zealand	
5	Martin Bláha	Czech Republic	
6	Lucas Liss	Germany	
7	Jang Sun-jae	South Korea	
8	Ángel Colla	Argentina	
9	Pablo Bernal	Spain	
10	Vivien Brisse	France	
11	Edison Bravo	Chile	
12	Franco Marvulli	Switzerland	
13	Pavel Gatskiy	Kazakhstan	
14	Andreas Mueller	Austria	
15	Ivan Savitsky	Russia	
16	Alex Edmondson	Australia	
17	Hariff Salleh	Malaysia	
18	Aliaksandr Lisouski	Belarus	
19	Moreno de Pauw	Belgium	
20	Bobby Lea	United States	
21	Elia Viviani	Italy	
