= UCI Golden Bike =

The UCI Golden Bike is a series of Cyclosportive cycling races. At present it consists of 7 events in 7 countries – 5 in Europe, 1 in Africa and 1 in Oceania – all selected by the International Cycling Union (UCI) as being the best cycling for all events in the world.

The UCI Golden Bike series was created in 1999 to encourage cyclists to live their passion outside of their country and enable them to discover new horizons, in terms of both sport and culture.

The current events include:

South Africa - Cape Town Cycle Tour

Belgium - De Ronde van Vlaanderen

Italy - Gran Fondo Internazionale Felice Gimondi

Spain - Quebrantahuesos

France - Cyclosportive l’Ariégeoise

Switzerland - Gruyère Cycling Tour

New Zealand - Lake Taupo Cycle Challenge
