= Maroesjka Matthee =

South African cyclist (born 1989)

Personal information
- Born: 10 January 1989 (age 37) South Africa

Cycling career
- Sport: Cycling
- Disciplines: Track; Road
- Role: Rider

Professional team
- 2020: Ciclotel

Maroesjka Matthee (born 10 January 1989) is a South African road and track cyclist, who most recently rode for UCI Women's Continental Team Ciclotel. She represented her nation at the 2015 UCI Track Cycling World Championships.

== Major results ==
2014
2nd Omnium, South East Asian GP Track 3
3rd Omnium, South East Asian GP Track 1
3rd Points race, South East Asian GP Track 2
2015
African Track Championships

1st Individual pursuit
1st Omnium
1st Points race
1st Scratch
1st Team pursuit (with Ilze Bole, Claudia Gnudi and Danielle Norman)

KZN Autumn Series

5th Freedom Day Classic
9th Hibiscus Cycle Classic

2016
1st Keirin, SA Grand Prix
2018
Africa Cup

1st Road race
3rd Team time trial

2nd Road race, National Road Championships
2019
African Games

1st Road race
1st Team time trial

2020
3rd Road race, National Road Championships
2021
1st Team time trial, African Road Championships
