= Jayde Julius =

South African cyclist (born 1993)

Personal information
- Full name: Jayde Andrew Julius
- Born: 17 August 1993 (age 33) Bellville, South Africa
- Height: 1.81 m (5 ft 11 in)
- Weight: 59 kg (130 lb)

Cycling career
- Sport: Cycling
- Current team: Kuwait Pro Cycling Team
- Discipline: Road
- Role: Rider

Amateur teams
- 2009: Lotto Olympia Tienen
- 2010–2011: Cube–Fintro
- 2012: Bianchi–Lotto–Nieuwe Hoop Tielen
- 2013: United
- 2014: Team Bonitas
- 2015: MTN–Qhubeka WCCA Feeder
- 2017: AlfaBodyWorks
- 2018: Team Pro Touch

Professional teams
- 2015: MTN–Qhubeka (stagiaire)
- 2016: Dimension Data for Qhubeka
- 2019–2020: ProTouch
- 2021–: Kuwait Pro Cycling Team

Jayde Andrew Julius (born 27 August 1993 in Bellville) is a South African cyclist, who currently rides for UCI Continental team Kuwait Pro Cycling Team.

== Major results ==
2011
2nd Remouchamps–Ferrières–Remouchamps
2015
African Road Championships

1st Under-23 road race
7th Road race

1st Road race, National Under-23 Road Championships
3rd Road race, National Road Championships
2016
5th Road race, National Road Championships
2018
2nd Overall Tour de Limpopo

1st Stage 4 (TTT)

2nd 100 Cycle Challenge
4th Time trial, National Road Championships
2019
1st Team time trial, African Games
1st 100 Cycle Challenge
Challenge du Prince

1st Trophée Princier
2nd Trophée de la Maison Royale

5th Time trial, National Road Championships
8th Road race, African Road Championships
10th Overall Tour de Limpopo
2020
3rd Road race, National Road Championships
