= 2019 UCI Road World Championships – Men's under-23 road race =

Men's under-23 road race
2021 UCI Road World Championships
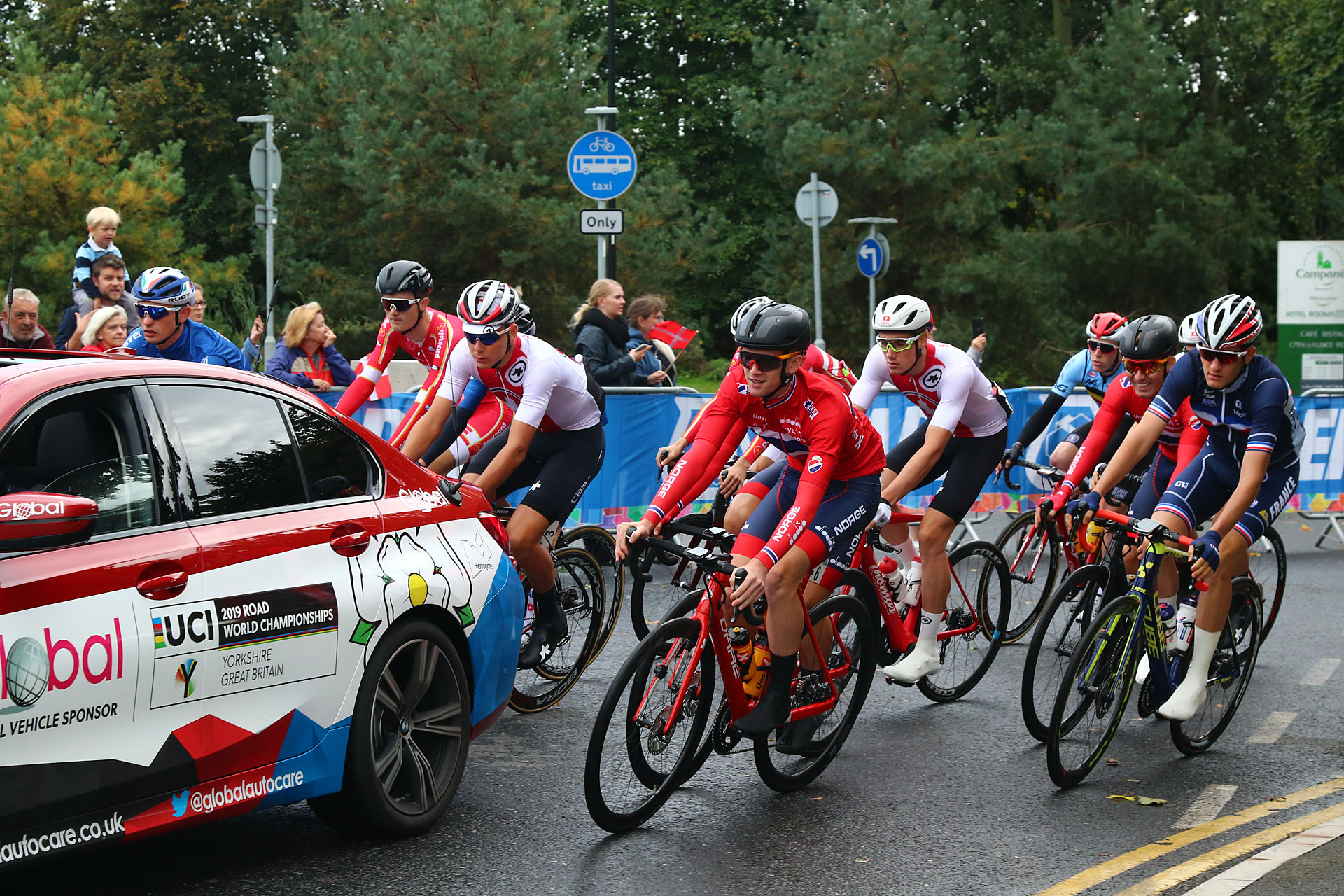
- The start of the race

Race details
- Dates: 27 September 2019
- Stages: 1
- Distance: 173 km (107.5 mi)
- Winning time: 3h 53' 52"

Medalists
	Gold	(Italy) Samuele Battistella (ITA)
	Silver	(Switzerland) Stefan Bissegger (SUI)
	Bronze	(United Kingdom) Tom Pidcock (GBR)

The Men's under-23 road race of the 2019 UCI Road World Championships was a cycling event that took place on 27 September 2019 from Doncaster to Harrogate in Yorkshire, England. It was the 24th edition of the event. The race was won by Italian rider Samuele Battistella in a group sprint of six riders.

== Final classification ==
Of the race's 158 entrants, 113 riders completed the full distance of 173 kilometres (107 mi).

Rank	Rider	Country	Time
1	Samuele Battistella	Italy	3h 53' 52"
2	Stefan Bissegger	Switzerland	+ 0"
3	Tom Pidcock	Great Britain	+ 0"
4	Sergio Higuita	Colombia	+ 0"
5	Andreas Kron	Denmark	+ 0"
6	Tobias Foss	Norway	+ 0"
7	Pascal Eenkhoorn	Netherlands	+ 38"
8	Mikkel Bjerg	Denmark	+ 38"
9	Mathieu Burgaudeau	France	+ 38"
10	Torjus Sleen	Norway	+ 38"
11	Stan Dewulf	Belgium	+ 38"
12	Georg Zimmermann	Germany	+ 38"
13	Kevin Geniets	Luxembourg	+ 38"
14	Kaden Groves	Australia	+ 38"
15	Jonas Rutsch	Germany	+ 40"
16	Morten Hulgaard	Denmark	+ 40"
17	Szymon Sajnok	Poland	+ 42"
18	Jake Stewart	Great Britain	+ 52"
19	Ilan Van Wilder	Belgium	+ 1' 28"
20	Ide Schelling	Netherlands	+ 1' 32"
21	Mauro Schmid	Luxembourg	+ 2' 01"
22	Vadim Pronskiy	Kazakhstan	+ 2' 55"
23	Robin Froidevaux	Switzerland	+ 3' 02"
24	Yevgeniy Fedorov	Kazakhstan	+ 3' 02"
25	Tilen Finkšt	Slovenia	+ 3' 02"
26	Nickolas Zukowsky	Canada	+ 3' 02"
27	Simon Guglielmi	France	+ 3' 02"
28	Fred Wright	Great Britain	+ 3' 02"
29	Matúš Štoček	Slovakia	+ 3' 02"
30	André Carvalho	Portugal	+ 3' 02"
31	Attila Valter	Hungary	+ 3' 02"
32	Masahiro Ishigami	Japan	+ 3' 02"
33	Stanisław Aniołkowski	Poland	+ 3' 02"
34	Daan Hoole	Netherlands	+ 3' 02"
35	Barnabás Peák	Hungary	+ 3' 02"
36	Johan Jacobs	Switzerland	+ 3' 02"
37	Aljaž Jarc	Slovenia	+ 3' 06"
38	Jakub Otruba	Czech Republic	+ 3' 07"
39	Stuart Balfour	Great Britain	+ 3' 07"
40	Žiga Jerman	Slovenia	+ 3' 07"
