= Sirak Tesfom =

Eritrean cyclist

Personal information
- Full name: Sirak Tesfom
- Born: 10 October 1994 (age 32) Asmara, Eritrea

Cycling career
- Sport: Cycling
- Discipline: Road
- Role: Rider

Amateur team
- 2017–2018: EriTel

Professional team
- 2019: Bike Aid

Sirak Tesfom (born 10 October 1994) is an Eritrean road racing cyclist, who last rode for UCI Continental team Bike Aid.

== Major results ==
2016
1st Time trial, National Junior Road Championships
2017
5th Fenkil Northern Red Sea Challenge
6th Asmara Circuit
10th Overall Tour Eritrea
2018 (1 pro win)
Africa Cup

1st Road race
1st Time trial
1st Team time trial

2019
African Road Championships

1st Team time trial
2nd Time trial

2nd Time trial, National Road Championships
African Games

2nd Team time trial
5th Time trial

5th Overall La Tropicale Amissa Bongo

1st Mountains classification

5th Overall Tour du Rwanda
