= Samuele Battistella =

Italian cyclist (born 1998)

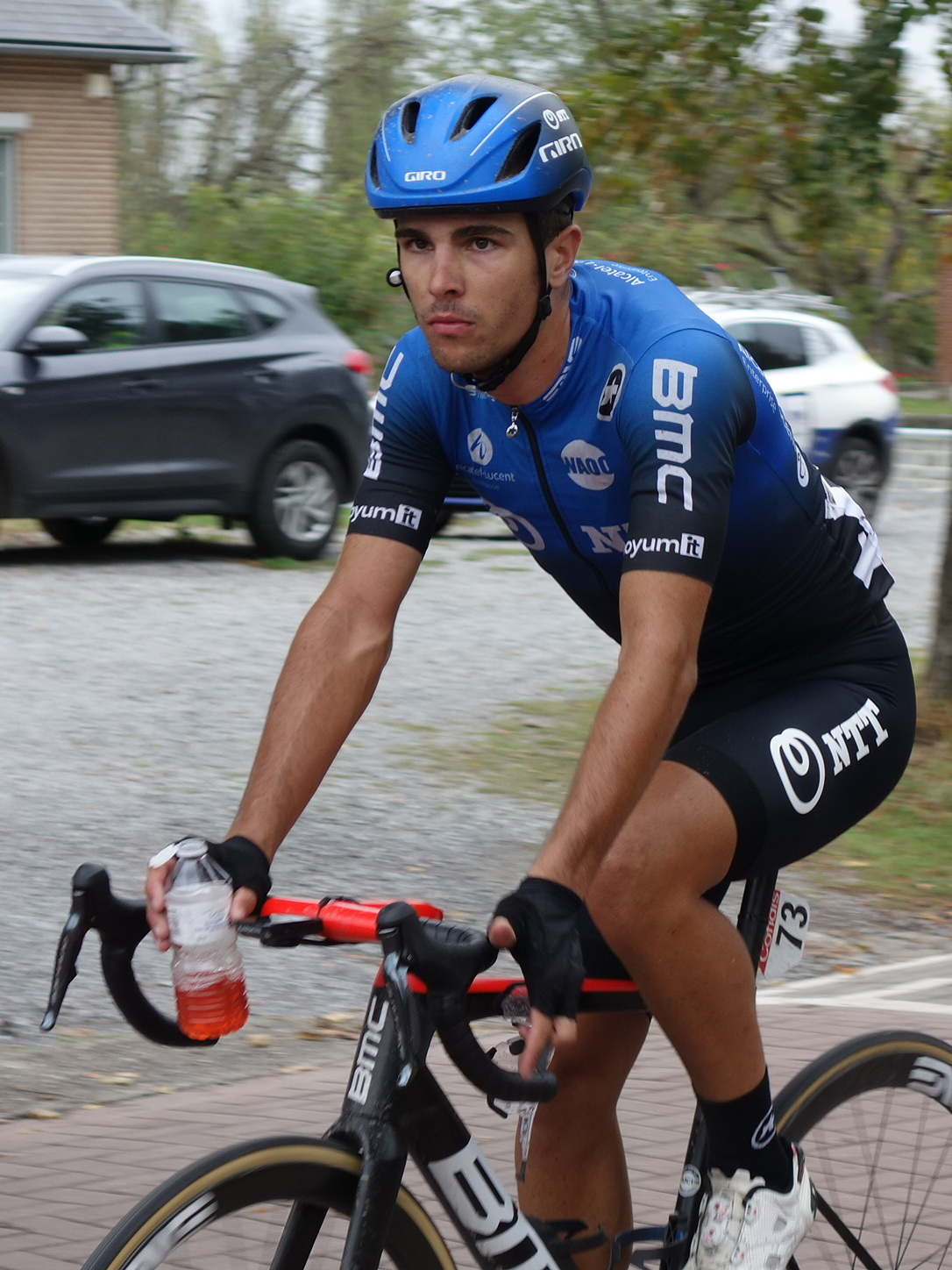
- Battistella at the 2020 La Flèche Wallonne

Personal information
- Full name: Samuele Battistella
- Born: 14 November 1998 (age 27) Castelfranco Veneto, Italy
- Height: 1.80 m (5 ft 11 in)
- Weight: 67 kg (148 lb)

Cycling career
- Sport: Cycling
- Current team: EF Education–EasyPost
- Discipline: Road
- Role: Rider

Amateur teams
- 2011–2014: UC Giorgione
- 2015: VC Breganze
- 2016: Cyber Breganze Group
- 2017–2018: Zalf–Euromobil–Désirée–Fior

Professional teams
- 2019: Dimension Data for Qhubeka
- 2020: NTT Pro Cycling
- 2021–2024: Astana–Premier Tech
- 2025–: EF Education–EasyPost
Medal record
Representing Italy
Men's road bicycle racing
World Championships
Gold medal – first place	2019 Yorkshire	Under-23 road race

Samuele Battistella (born 14 November 1998) is an Italian cyclist, who currently rides for UCI WorldTeam EF Education–EasyPost. Battistella's first professional win was at the 2021 Veneto Classic. He was initially named to the Astana team for the 2022 Tour de France, but was diagnosed with COVID-19 right before the race. He instead rode at the 2022 Vuelta a España.

== Major results ==
2016
1st Trofeo Buffoni
3rd Overall Giro della Lunigiana
5th Road race, UEC European Junior Road Championships
5th Montichiari–Roncone
6th Trofeo Guido Dorigo
7th Trofeo Citta di Loano
2018
1st Coppa Città di San Daniele
2nd Overall Grand Prix Priessnitz spa

1st Points classification
1st Stage 1

3rd Gran Premio Sportivi di Poggiana
4th Giro del Belvedere
6th Trofeo Città di San Vendemiano
6th Giro del Medio Brenta
8th Trofeo Edil C
2019
1st Road race, UCI Road World Under-23 Championships
1st Overall Tour de Limpopo

1st Mountains classification
1st Young rider classification
1st Stage 3

1st Giro del Belvedere
2nd G.P. Palio del Recioto
6th Trofeo Piva
2021
1st Veneto Classic
4th Overall Arctic Race of Norway
4th Coppa Bernocchi
6th Trofeo Matteotti
10th Giro della Toscana
2022
3rd Road race, National Road Championships
3rd Overall Tour de Hongrie
5th Prueba Villafranca de Ordizia
7th Overall Tour de Pologne
7th Overall Tour de la Provence
Combativity award Stage 12 Vuelta a España
2023
6th Veneto Classic
7th Giro del Veneto
9th Overall Tour de Pologne
2024
6th GP Miguel Induráin
6th Prueba Villafranca de Ordizia

=== Grand Tour general classification results timeline ===
Grand Tour	2021	2022	2023
Giro d'Italia	82	—	DNF
Tour de France	—	—	—
Vuelta a España	—	DNF	121

Legend
—	Did not compete
DNF	Did not finish
