= Lorrenzo Manzin =

French cyclist (born 1994)

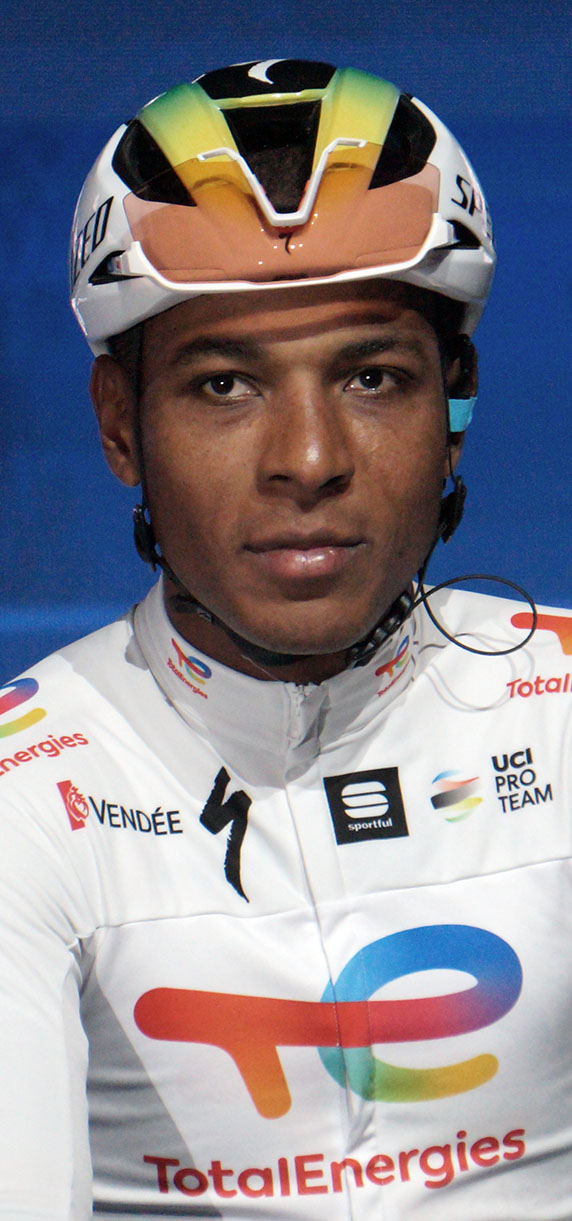
- Manzin in 2023

Personal information
- Full name: Lorrenzo Manzin
- Born: 26 July 1994 (age 32) Saint-Denis, Réunion, France
- Height: 1.75 m (5 ft 9 in)
- Weight: 70 kg (154 lb)

Cycling career
- Sport: Cycling
- Current team: Team TotalEnergies
- Discipline: Road
- Role: Rider
- Rider type: Sprinter

Amateur teams
- 2001–2011: VC de l'Est
- 2010–2012: CC Castelbriantais Junior
- 2013–2014: Team UC Nantes Atlantique
- 2014: FDJ.fr (stagiaire)

Professional teams
- 2015–2017: FDJ
- 2018–2019: Vital Concept
- 2020–: Total Direct Énergie

Lorrenzo Manzin (born 26 July 1994) is a French cyclist, who currently rides for UCI ProTeam Team TotalEnergies.

He joined FDJ in 2015 with a 2-year contract after riding for the team the previous season as a stagiaire. On 26 April 2015, Manzin sprinted to his first professional victory at La Roue Tourangelle. He was named in the start list for the 2015 Vuelta a España, where he withdrew during the tenth stage.

== Major results ==
2012
1st Boucles de Trélon
1st Stage 3 Tour de La Réunion
1st Points classification, Trofeo Karlsberg
2013
1st Overall Tour de La Réunion

1st Prologue (TTT) & Stage 6 (ITT)

1st Grand Prix de Cherves
2014
1st Boucles Catalan
1st Stage 2 Boucle de l'Artois
1st Stage 2 Tour de l'Eure-et-Loire
2nd SportBreizh
2015
1st La Roue Tourangelle
8th Grand Prix de Denain
2016
5th Grand Prix de Denain
9th Trofeo Playa de Palma
2017
3rd Grand Prix de la Somme
2018
1st Stage 4 Tour du Limousin
2nd Paris–Troyes
3rd Polynormande
6th Brussels Cycling Classic
7th Primus Classic
8th Overall Tour de Wallonie
8th Paris–Camembert
8th Elfstedenronde
2019
1st Overall Tour de Bretagne

1st Points classification

1st Grand Prix de la Somme
2nd Overall La Tropicale Amissa Bongo

1st Stages 4 & 7

3rd Circuito de Getxo
9th Boucles de l'Aulne
2020
1st Stage 7 La Tropicale Amissa Bongo
2021
1st Clàssica Comunitat Valenciana 1969
5th Paris–Camembert
10th La Roue Tourangelle
2022
1st Stage 4 Tour Poitou-Charentes en Nouvelle-Aquitaine
5th Cholet-Pays de la Loire
7th Overall Four Days of Dunkirk
8th La Roue Tourangelle
8th Omloop van het Houtland
10th Eschborn–Frankfurt
2023
3rd Cholet-Pays de la Loire

=== Grand Tour general classification results timeline ===
Grand Tour	2015	2016	2017	2018	2019	2020
Giro d'Italia	Has not contested during his career					
Tour de France	Has not contested during his career					
Vuelta a España	DNF	149	156	—	—	133

Legend
—	Did not compete
DNF	Did not finish
