= Tour of Peninsular =

Race details
- Date: October
- Region: Malaysia
- Discipline: Road
- Competition: UCI Asia Tour
- Type: Stage race
- Web site: www.tourpeninsular.com

History
- First edition: 2019
- Editions: 1
- First winner: Marcos García (ESP)
- Most recent: Marcos García (ESP)

The Tour of Peninsular was a professional road bicycle racing stage race held in Malaysia in 2019. The race was part of the UCI Asia Tour and was classified by the International Cycling Union (UCI) as a 2.1 category race. The first and only edition was won by Spanish rider Marcos García.

== Past winners ==
Year	Country	Rider	Team
2019	Spain	Marcos García	Kinan Cycling Team

=== 2019 ===
- Points classification - Rohan Du Plooy
- Mountain classification - Marcos García
- Team classification - Kinan Cycling Team
- Stage 1 winner - Elchin Asadov
- Stage 2 winner - Rohan Du Plooy
- Stage 3 winner - Nur Amirul Fakhruddin Mazuki
- Stage 4 winner - Marcos García
- Stage 5 winner - Cristian Raileanu
