= Ertjies Bezuidenhout =

South African cyclist

Ernst Bezuidenhout (13 October 1955, Vanderbijlpark – 29 February 2012, Pretoria) was a well-known South African cyclist, better known under his nickname Ertjies. He won the Rapport Tour in 1984 and the Argus three times in 1981, 1982 en 1986. Ertjies was a strong climber and won the King of the Mountains title several times during the Rapport Tour. Other cyclists of his era are Alan van Heerden and Robbie McIntosh.

Ertjiesberg on the R 500 main road between Fochville and Parys is named after him; he had a regular workout here.

A student at the Potchefstroom University from 1976 to 1978, he exercised relentlessly to become a Springbok cyclist. At hostel, he regularly mounted his racing bicycle on a weekday afternoon and took his washing to be done at his parents' home in Vanderbijlpark, returning the same evening to Potchefstroom. To him, this trip was just a regular brief exercise.
