= 2015 KZN Autumn Series =

The KZN Autumn Series was a series of road cycling races held in Pietermaritzburg and Margate, KwaZulu-Natal in South Africa between 27 April and 3 May 2015. The series comprised three races, the Freedom Day Classic on 27 April, the Mayday Classic on 1 May, and the Hibiscus Cycle Classic on 3 May. Both the Freedom Day Classic and the Hibiscus Cycle Classic included women's races, while all three men's races formed part of the 2015 UCI Africa Tour.

== Freedom Day Classic ==
=== Men's race ===
2015 Freedom Day Classic
Race details
- Dates: 27 April 2015
- Distance: 157 km (97.56 mi)
- Winning time: 4h 02' 56"

Results
	Winner	Reynard Butler (ZAF)
	Second	Hendrik Kruger (ZAF)
	Third	Nicholas Dlamini (ZAF)

Results
Rank	Rider	Time
1	Reynard Butler (ZAF)	4h 02' 56"
2	Hendrik Kruger (ZAF)	+ 14"
3	Nicholas Dlamini (ZAF)	+ 17"
4	Stefan de Bod (ZAF)	+ 22"
5	David Maree (ZAF)	+ 22"
6	Gustav Basson (ZAF)	+ 36"
7	Ryan Gibbons (ZAF)	+ 37"
8	Shaun-Nick Bester (ZAF)	+ 37"
9	Morne van Niekerk (ZAF)	+ 37"
10	Nolan Hoffman (ZAF)	+ 38"

=== Women's race ===
2015 Freedom Day Classic
Race details
- Dates: 27 April 2015
- Distance: 113 km (70.21 mi)
- Winning time: 3h 23' 19"

Results
	Winner	Cherise Stander (ZAF)
	Second	An-Li Pretorius (ZAF)
	Third	Lise Olivier (ZAF)

Results
Rank	Rider	Time
1	Cherise Stander (ZAF)	3h 23' 19"
2	An-Li Pretorius (ZAF)	+ 2' 52"
3	Lise Olivier (ZAF)	+ 2' 53"
4	Lynette Buizer (ZAF)	+ 5' 43"
5	Maroesjka Matthee (ZAF)	+ 8' 43"
6	Charlene du Preez (ZAF)	+ 8' 44"
7	Catherine Colyn (ZAF)	+ 8' 44"
8	Heidi Dalton (ZAF)	+ 8' 45"
9	Zanele Tshoko (ZAF)	+ 8' 45"
10	Candice Neethling (ZAF)	+ 8' 45"

== Mayday Classic ==
2015 Mayday Classic
Race details
- Dates: 1 May 2015
- Distance: 182 km (113.1 mi)
- Winning time: 4h 47' 07"

Results
Rank	Rider	Time
1	Hendrik Kruger (ZAF)	4h 47' 07"
1	Nicholas Dlamini (ZAF)	4h 47' 07"
3	Metkel Eyob (ERI)	+ 4"
4	Ryan Gibbons (ZAF)	+ 1' 25"
5	Herman Fouche (ZAF)	+ 1' 26"
6	Tesfom Okubamariam (ERI)	+ 1' 26"
7	Kevin Patten (ZAF)	+ 1' 27"
8	Nolan Hoffman (ZAF)	+ 1' 27"
9	Jozua le Roux (ZAF)	+ 1' 28"
10	David Maree (ZAF)	+ 1' 29"

== Hibiscus Cycle Classic ==
=== Men's race ===
2015 Hibiscus Cycle Classic
Race details
- Dates: 3 May 2015
- Distance: 155 km (96.31 mi)
- Winning time: 4h 00' 03"

Results
	Winner	Metkel Eyob (ERI)
	Second	Hendrik Kruger (ZAF)
	Third	Meron Teshome (ERI)

Results
Rank	Rider	Time
1	Metkel Eyob (ERI)	4h 00' 03"
2	Hendrik Kruger (ZAF)	+ 20"
3	Meron Teshome (ERI)	+ 20"
4	Ryan Gibbons (ZAF)	+ 20"
5	Clint Hendricks (ZAF)	+ 21"
6	Gustav Basson (ZAF)	+ 21"
7	Shaun-Nick Bester (ZAF)	+ 21"
8	Stefan Ihlenfeldt (ZAF)	+ 21"
9	Kevin Patten (ZAF)	+ 21"
10	James Fourie (ZAF)	+ 22"

=== Women's race ===
2015 Hibiscus Cycle Classic
Race details
- Dates: 3 May 2015
- Distance: 108.5 km (67.42 mi)
- Winning time: 3h 15' 48"

Results
	Winner	Cherise Stander (ZAF)
	Second	Lise Olivier (ZAF)
	Third	An-Li Pretorius (ZAF)

Results
Rank	Rider	Time
1	Cherise Stander (ZAF)	3h 15' 48"
2	Lise Olivier (ZAF)	+ 1"
3	An-Li Pretorius (ZAF)	+ 1"
4	Heidi Dalton (ZAF)	+ 2' 29"
5	Lynette Buizer (ZAF)	+ 2' 29"
6	Charlene du Preez (ZAF)	+ 6' 17"
7	Candice Neethling (ZAF)	+ 11' 32"
8	Michelle Benson (ZAF)	+ 16' 30"
9	Maroesjka Matthee (ZAF)	+ 24' 38"
10	Ronet Human (ZAF)	+ 24' 54"
