= Rohan Du Plooy =

South African bicycle racer

Personal information
- Full name: Rohan Du Plooy
- Born: 14 September 1994 (age 32) Cape Town, South Africa

Cycling career
- Sport: Cycling
- Current team: ProTouch
- Discipline: Road
- Role: Rider

Amateur teams
- 2016: Team Martigues SC–Drag Bicycles
- 2016: Lights by Linea
- 2017–2018: Verandas Willems–Crabbé–CC Chevigny
- 2018: AlphaBodyWorks–Giant

Professional team
- 2019–: ProTouch

Rohan Du Plooy (born 14 September 1994) is a South African cyclist, who currently rides for the UCI Continental team ProTouch.

In 2019, Du Plooy won the points classification at the Tour du Rwanda, the Tour of Indonesia, and the Tour of Peninsular. As well as this, he won stage 2 at the Tour of Peninsular, and stage 5 at the Mpumalanga Cycle Tour.

== Major results ==
2011
3rd Time trial, National Junior Road Championships
2012
1st Time trial, National Junior Road Championships
2014
3rd Time trial, National Under-23 Road Championships
2018
1st Perwez Grand Prix
3rd Time trial, National Road Championships
10th Circuit de Wallonie
2019
1st Kremetart Cycle Race
Tour of Peninsular

1st Points classification
1st Stage 2

1st Points classification Tour of Rwanda
1st Points classification Tour of Indonesia
1st Stage 5 Mpumalanga Cycle Tour
9th Overall Tour of China I
