= Erica Green (cyclist) =

South African cyclist

Personal information
- Full name: Erica Lynn Green Groenewald
- Born: 25 September 1970 (age 56) Johannesburg, South Africa
- Height: 171 cm (5 ft 7 in)
- Weight: 60 kg (132 lb)

Cycling career
- Sport: Cycling
- Discipline: Road cycling
- Role: Rider

Erica Lynn Green Groenewald (born 25 September 1970) is a mountain bike rider and road cyclist from South Africa. She represented her nation at the 1996 Summer Olympics on the road in the women's road race and on the mountain bike in the women's cross-country and at the 2000 Summer Olympics in the women's cross-country.
