= Anke Erlank =

South African cyclist

Personal information
- Born: South Africa

Cycling career
- Sport: Cycling
- Discipline: Road cycling

Anke Erlank (born 28 July 1977) is a road cyclist from South Africa. She represented her nation at the 2006 UCI Road World Championships.
