= PMB Road Classic =

South African one-day road cycling race

Race details
- Date: April
- Region: South Africa
- Discipline: Road
- Competition: UCI Africa Tour
- Type: One-day race

History
- First edition: 2015
- Editions: 1
- Final edition: 2015
- First winner: Reynard Butler (RSA)
- Final winner: Reynard Butler (RSA)

The PMB Road Classic was a one-day road cycling race held in South Africa in 2015. It was held as part of the 2015 UCI Africa Tour, as a 1.2-categorised race.

== Winners ==
Year	Country	Rider	Team
2015	South Africa	Reynard Butler	Team Abantu
