= ProTouch =

South African cycling team

Team information
- UCI code: PRO
- Registered: South Africa
- Founded: 2016
- Status: UCI Continental

Key personnel
- General manager: Bradley Eliot
- Team managers: Tony Harding; Rebecca Eliot

Team name history
- 2016–2018 2019–: Team Pro Touch; ProTouch

ProTouch is a South African UCI Continental road cycling team established in 2016.

== Team roster ==
As of 14 February 2022.

Rider	Date of birth
Gustav Basson (RSA)	23 February 1996 (age 30)
Tiano Da Silva (RSA)	17 April 2001 (age 25)
Rohan Du Plooy (RSA)	14 September 1994 (age 31)
Mitchell Eliot (RSA)	24 June 1996 (age 30)
Jean Eric Habimana (RWA)	1 January 2001 (age 25)
Charles Kagimu (UGA)	15 September 1998 (age 27)

Rider	Date of birth
Kent Main (RSA)	8 January 1996 (age 30)
Moise Mugisha (RWA)	1 January 1997 (age 29)
Samuel Mugisha (RWA)	5 December 1997 (age 28)
Jean Claude Nzafashwanayo (RWA)	4 August 2000 (age 26)
Callum Ormiston (RSA)	2 August 2000 (age 26)
Mehari Tewelde (ETH)	5 June 2001 (age 25)

== Major results ==
2018
Overall Tour de Limpopo, Gustav Basson

Stage 1, Gustav Basson
Stage 3 (TTT)

2019
100 Cycle Challenge, Jayde Julius
Stage 4 Tour de Limpopo, Clint Hendricks
Challenge du Prince–Trophée Princier, Jayde Julius
Stage 4 Tour of China II, Reynard Butler
Stage 2 Tour of Peninsular, Rohan Du Plooy
2021
Stage 10 Tour du Faso, Gustav Basson
2022
Stage 4 Tour du Rwanda, Kent Main
Stage 8 Tour du Rwanda, Moise Mugisha
