= Jackie Martin (cyclist) =

South African cyclist

Personal information
- Full name: Jacqueline Alison "Jackie" Martin
- Born: 4 December 1971 (age 54) South Africa

Cycling career
- Sport: Cycling
- Discipline: Road cycling
- Role: Rider

Jacqueline Alison "Jackie" Martin (born 4 December 1971) is a road cyclist from South Africa. She represented her nation in the women's road race at the 1992 Summer Olympics and 1996 Summer Olympics.
