= 100 Cycle Challenge =

Road Race

Race details
- Date: annually on the first Sunday in May
- Region: South Africa
- Discipline: Road
- Competition: 1.2
- Web site: 100cyclechallenge.co.za

History
- First edition: 2018
- Editions: 1 (as of 2018)
- First winner: Nolan Hoffman (SA)
- Most wins: No repeat winners
- Most recent: Kimberley Le Court (MRI)

History (women)
- First winner: Kimberley Le Court (MRI)

The 100 Cycle Challenge is the biggest autumn road race for cyclists from across Gauteng Province and the rest of South Africa. It takes place annually on the first Sunday in May and is presented on a 100 kilometer circuit route that begins and ends at Germiston Lake in the City of Ekurhuleni, east of Johannesburg.

The 2nd annual 100 Cycle Challenge was held on Sunday, 5 May 2019.

It was announced there will not be an annual 100 Cycle Challenge race held for 2020, and the next scheduled race is Sunday, 2 May 2021.

It is currently rated by the UCI as category 1.2.

== Overall winners ==
Year	Country	Rider	Team
2018	South Africa	Nolan Hoffman	BCX
2018	Mauritius	Kimberley Le Court	Demacon Ladies Cycling Team
