= Tour of Good Hope =

Race details
- Date: March
- Region: Cape Winelands District
- Discipline: Road
- Competition: UCI Africa Tour
- Type: Stage race
- Organiser: ASG Events
- Web site: tourofgoodhope.co.za

History
- First edition: 2019
- Editions: 2 (as of 2020)
- First winner: Marc Pritzen (RSA)
- Most wins: No repeat winners
- Most recent: Jaco Venter (RSA)

The Tour of Good Hope is a multi-day road cycling race that has been held annually in South Africa since 2019. It is part of UCI Africa Tour as a 2.2 event.

== Winners ==
Year	Country	Rider	Team
2019	South Africa	Marc Pritzen	Team Office Guru
2020	South Africa	Jaco Venter	AlfaBodyWorks-Giant
