= Tour de Limpopo =

Race details
- Date: May
- Region: South Africa
- Discipline: Road
- Competition: UCI Africa Tour
- Type: Stage race
- Web site: www.tourdelimpopo.co.za

History
- First edition: 2018
- Editions: 2 (as of 2019)
- First winner: Gustav Basson (RSA)
- Most wins: No repeat winners
- Most recent: Samuele Battistella (ITA)

The Tour de Limpopo is a multi-day road cycling race that has been held annually in South Africa since 2018. It is part of UCI Africa Tour as a 2.2 event.

== Winners ==
Year	Country	Rider	Team
2018	South Africa	Gustav Basson	
2019	Italy	Samuele Battistella	Dimension Data for Qhubeka
