= Wengia Solodorensis =

Student society at the Kantonsschule Solothurn, Switzerland

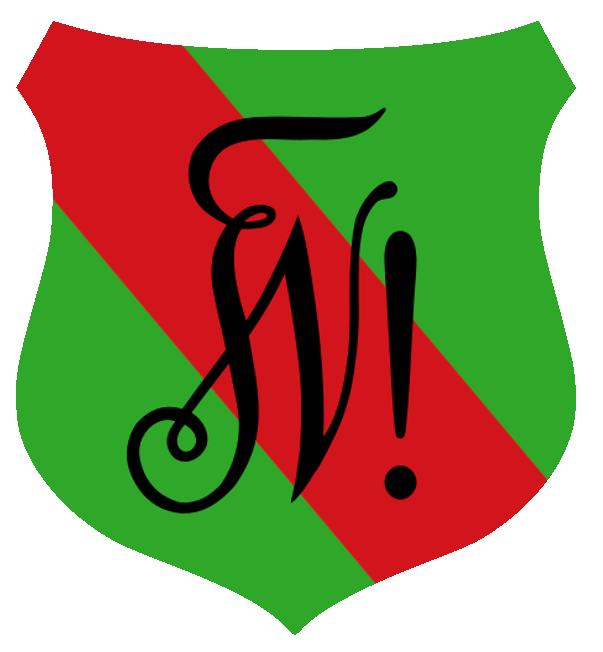
- Founded: November 7, 1884; 142 years ago Kantonsschule Solothurn
- Type: Studentenverbindung
- Affiliation: Independent
- Status: Active
- Emphasis: Non-dueling
- Scope: Local
- Motto: Patria, Amicitia, Scientia "Fatherland, Friendship, Science"
- Colors: Green, Red, Green
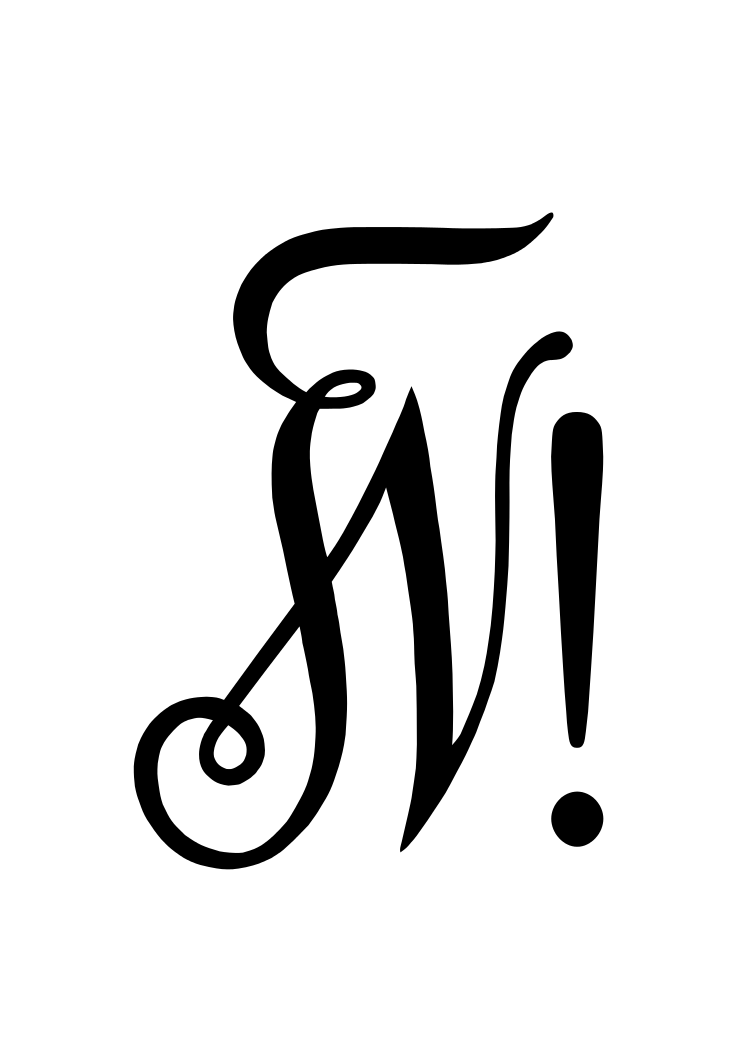
- Zirkel
- Publication: Der Wengianer
- Chapters: 1
- Headquarters: Friedhofplatz 14; Solothurn, Canton of Solothurn; Switzerland
- Website: www.wengia.ch

The Wengia Solodorensis is the oldest Studentenverbindung (German: [ʃtuˈdɛntn̩.fɛɐ̯ˌbɪndʊŋ]; also referred as "Verbindung"; translated as student society or fraternity) at the Kantonsschule Solothurn, the cantonal college of higher academic education.

After passing the Matura, the former active members join the Alt-Wengia (Alumni organisation). With approximately 600 living members, this forms the largest alumni association (German: Altherrenverband) amongst student societies in Solothurn and one of the largest in Switzerland.

== History ==
=== Early history ===
At the beginning of the 1880s there were already student groups at the Kantonsschule Solothurn as offshoots of the university corporations “Helvetia” and “Zofingia”. Their activities were banned by an executive council resolution in 1883. The purpose of the society is set out in their charter as follows: "The purpose of Wengia is to promote the scientific interest of its members. It should seek to unite them through friendship and, through lectures and discussions, enable them to come into life as prepared citizens."

In the summer of 1884 several students came together under the leadership of Bernhard Wyss and Leo Weltner with the aim of founding a new society. Probably in the memory of the former Spe-Fuxenvereinigung of “Helvetia”, the name “Wengia”, which originally went back to Niklaus Wengi, was adopted. For the cap they agreed on the green colour, which has been a symbol of the ”Radicals” in the canton of Solothurn, the ribbon was kept in the colours green-red-green. The new society should preserve the student tradition of Solothurn and educate its members based on the principles of the radical-democratic party ruling in Solothurn and Switzerland at that time.

On 7 November 1884, the Solothurn cantonal Executive council approved the statutes submitted by 15 students. The first president was Adolf Meyer v/o Storch, who died while he was still active, Leo Weltner v/o Streck acted as first Fux-Major. The first members had experienced activities of the former forbidden societies and were able to build on an old tradition in building the new society.

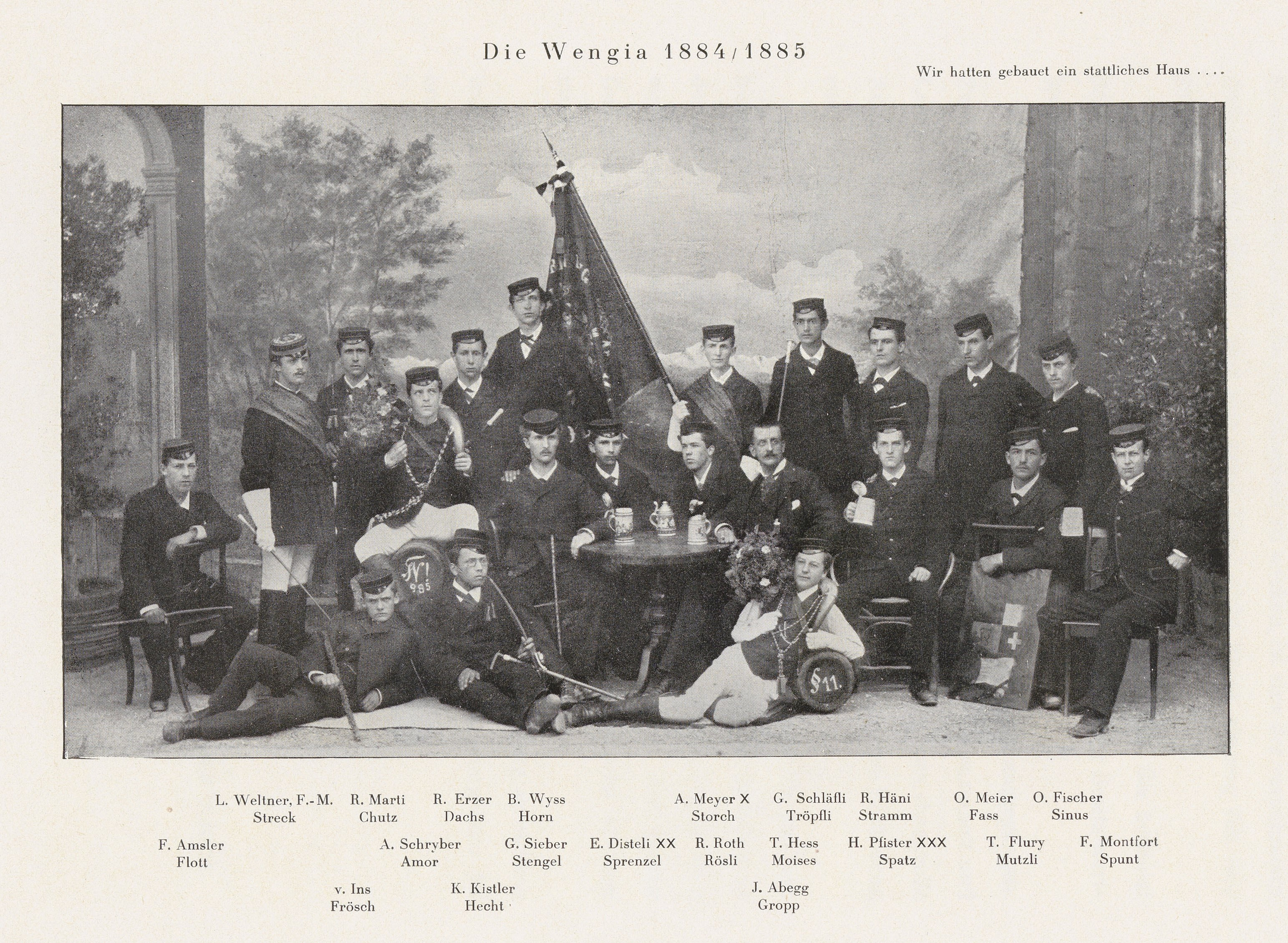
First Aktivitas of the Wengia, winter semester 1884–1885

This was followed by a time the new society was tried and tested. With the admission of other student societies at the college in 1907/1908, the "Wengia" was faced with competition, whereby the relationship among the societies developed from an open struggle at the beginning to a friendly co-existence today.

Society activities were subdued during the First World War. In contrast, the “Wengia” experienced an upswing during the Second World War. With school and fraternity life restricted, members showed great interest in the course of war and put themselves at the service of the Spiritual national defence.

The "Wengia" was delayed to feel the events of 1968, but the society accepted the challenge and was very popular in the years that followed.

== Symbols ==
The fraternity's motto is Patria, Amicitia, Scientia or "Fatherland, Friendship, Science". Its colors are green, red, and green. The society's publication is Der Wengianer was formed in October 1888, and has been published regularly several times a year since. The members of the "Wengia" refer to themselves as "Wengianer".

== Activities ==
The motto is upheld through lectures on political or scientific topics at regular meetings and study trips. The “Wengia” cultivates radical-liberal ideas, but is politically neutral. The prospective student can practice arguing, criticizing and speaking in a casual environment. Well-known representatives from politics, science or business are often invited as speakers. In this way, the active members are able to obtain first-hand information as future citizens and get to know experienced personalities. The motto Amicitia (“Friendship”) finds its expression in the social occasions of the society such as regular tables, Kneipen, Kommersen (both ceremonial drinking and singing sessions), balls, study trips, etc. Great importance is attached to maintaining student traditions and songs.

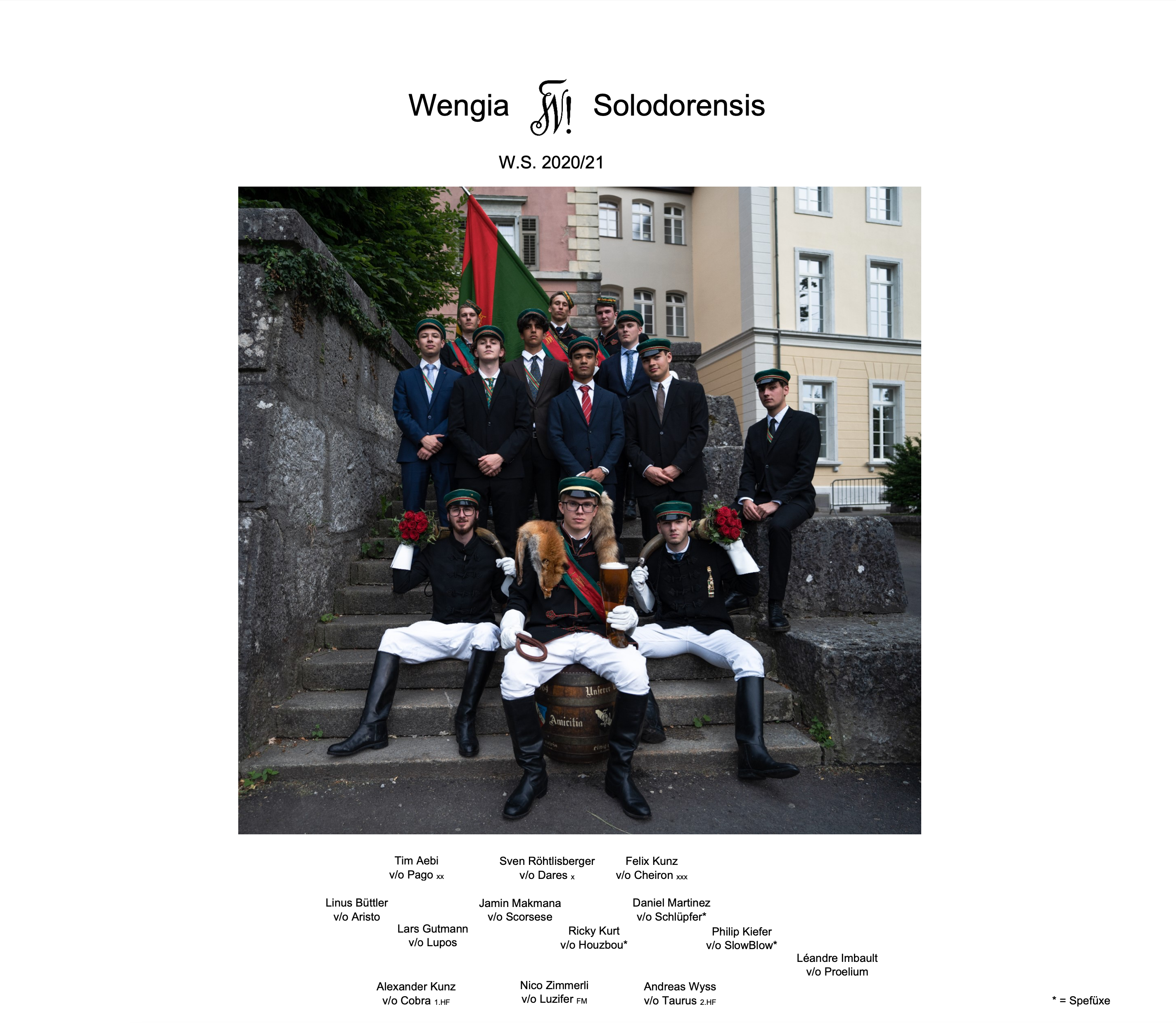
Aktivitas, winter semester 2020–2021

== Alumni organisation ==
The need of the old boys for an own association became apparent early on. In 1897, after many unsuccessful attempts, a permanent alumni organisation was founded. The regulars tables of the “Alt-Wengia” founded in many university towns in Switzerland not only made it possible to maintain old friendships outside of Solothurn, but also give newly enrolled students the opportunity to get advice and help counteract the anonymity in today's academic life. The great solidarity among the alumni is shown every year in November when more than 300 “Wengianer” attend the general assembly of the Alt-Wengia held in Solothurn.

== Regular pub and liaison house ==
For the first eight years, the Wengia did not have a regular pub. Its first long-term location was in the “Brasserie Schenker” in 1892. On 1 April 1946, the “Misteli” at Friedhofplatz 14 in Solothurn was selected as its regular pub. In 1957, a Kneipkeller was installed in the former stables. In 2006, the Kneipkeller was relocated to the vaulted cellar as part of the total renovation of the property. In 1986, the property was acquired by the Wengia building cooperative. In 2005, it was transferred to Misteli AG which is largely owned by the alumni association and its members.

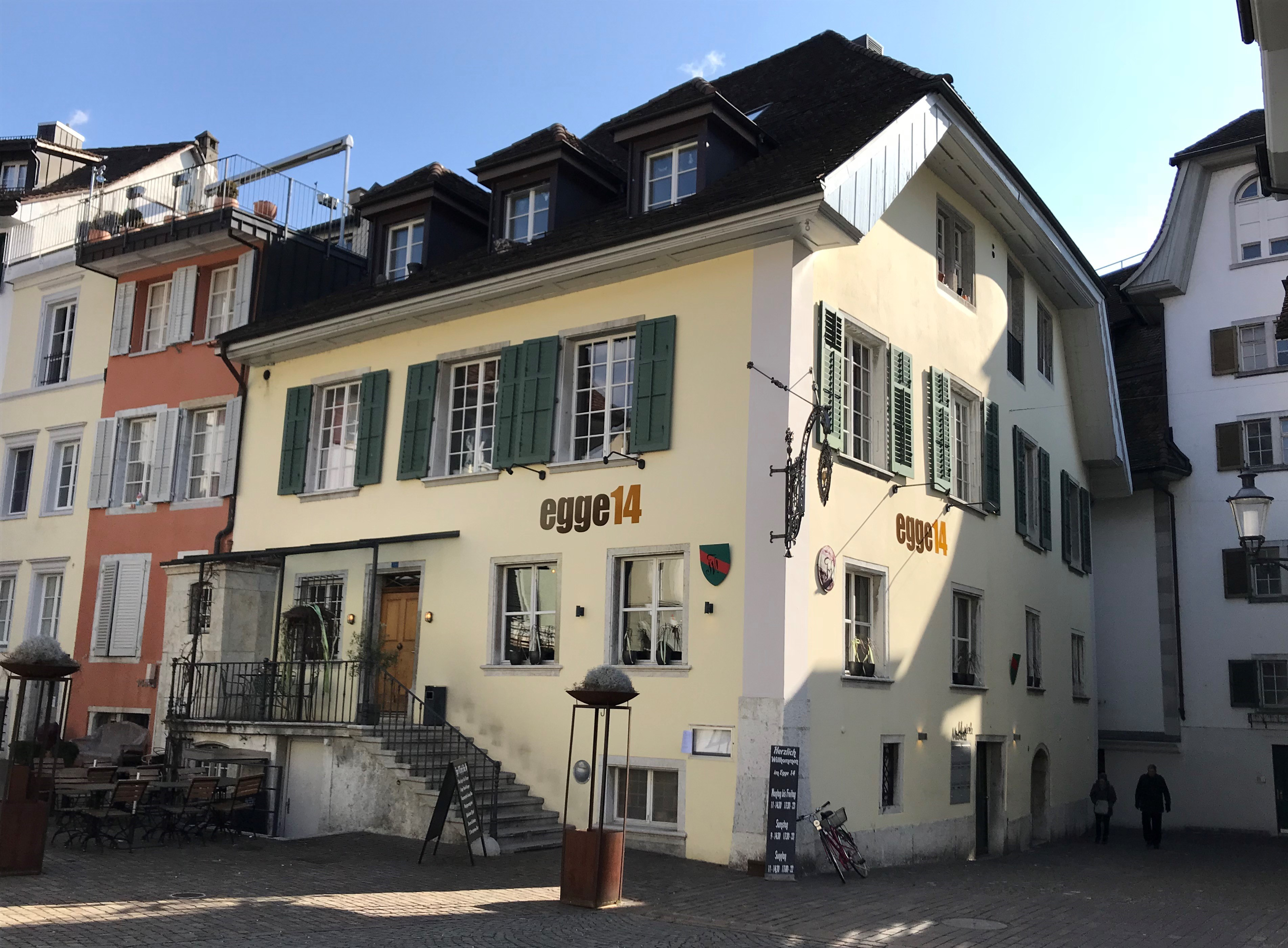
Misteli, at Friedhofplatz 14 in Solothurn

== Notable members ==
- Werner Kaiser (1868–1926), Executive Counsel (Member of the cantonal executive)
- Hans Affolter (1870–1936), Federal justice, Executive Counsel (Member of the cantonal Executive), National Councillor
- Hans Kaufmann (1871–1940), Executive Counsel (Member of the cantonal executive); Honorary member of the Alt-Wengia
- Arthur Oswald (1872–1938), Executive Counsel (Member of the cantonal executive
- Alfred Rudolf (1877–1955), Executive Counsel (Member of the cantonal executive)
- Walther Bösiger (1878–1960), Executive Counsel (Member of the cantonal executive)
- Adrian von Arx (1879–1934), Federal justice, National Councillor
- Heinrich Studer (1889–1961), Founder of the Amalthea Signum publishing company Vienna, Austria
- Eugen Bircher (1882–1956), National Councillor, Physician, Military publisher
- Robert Furrer (1882–1962), Director-General of Federal Customs Administration
- Walther Stampfli (1884–1965), Federal Councillor, National Councillor; Honorary member of the Alt-Wengia
- Oskar Stampfli (1886–1973), Executive Counsel (Member of the cantonal executive); Honorary member of the Alt-Wengia
- Hugo Meyer (1888–1958), Mayor of Olten
- Rolf Roth (1888–1985); Artist, Cartoonist, Poet; Honorary member of the Alt-Wengia
- Paul Haefelin (1889–1972), State Councillor, Mayor of Solothurn; Honorary member of the Alt-Wengia
- Eugen Dietschi (1896–1986), State Councillor, National Councillor; Honorary member of the Alt-Wengia
- Urs Dietschi (1901–1982), Executive Counsel (Member of the cantonal executive), National Councillor; Honorary member of the Alt-Wengia
- Max Petry (1904–1989); Major General, Chief of the Swiss artillery troops
- Paul Affolter (1917–2005); Director-General of Federal Customs Administration
- Kurt Locher (1917–1991), Director-General of the SwissFederal tax department
- Hans Künzi (1924–2004), Executive Counsel (Member of the cantonal executive), National Councillor
- Eugen Lüthy (1927–1990), Lieutenant General; Commander in Chief of the Swiss armed forces
- Manfred Schwarz (1932–2000), Playwright, theatre director and actor
- Robert Piller (1935–2019), Economist, journalist, local politician, supporter of the canton and the Jura region
- Mathias Feldges (1937–2022), Executive Counsel (Member of the cantonal executive)
- Samuel Schmid (* 1947), Federal Councillor, State Councillor, National Councillor; Honorary member of the Alt-Wengia
- Kurt Fluri (* 1955), National Councillor, Mayor of Solothurn

== See also ==
- List of Swiss student societies
