= List of Swiss student societies =

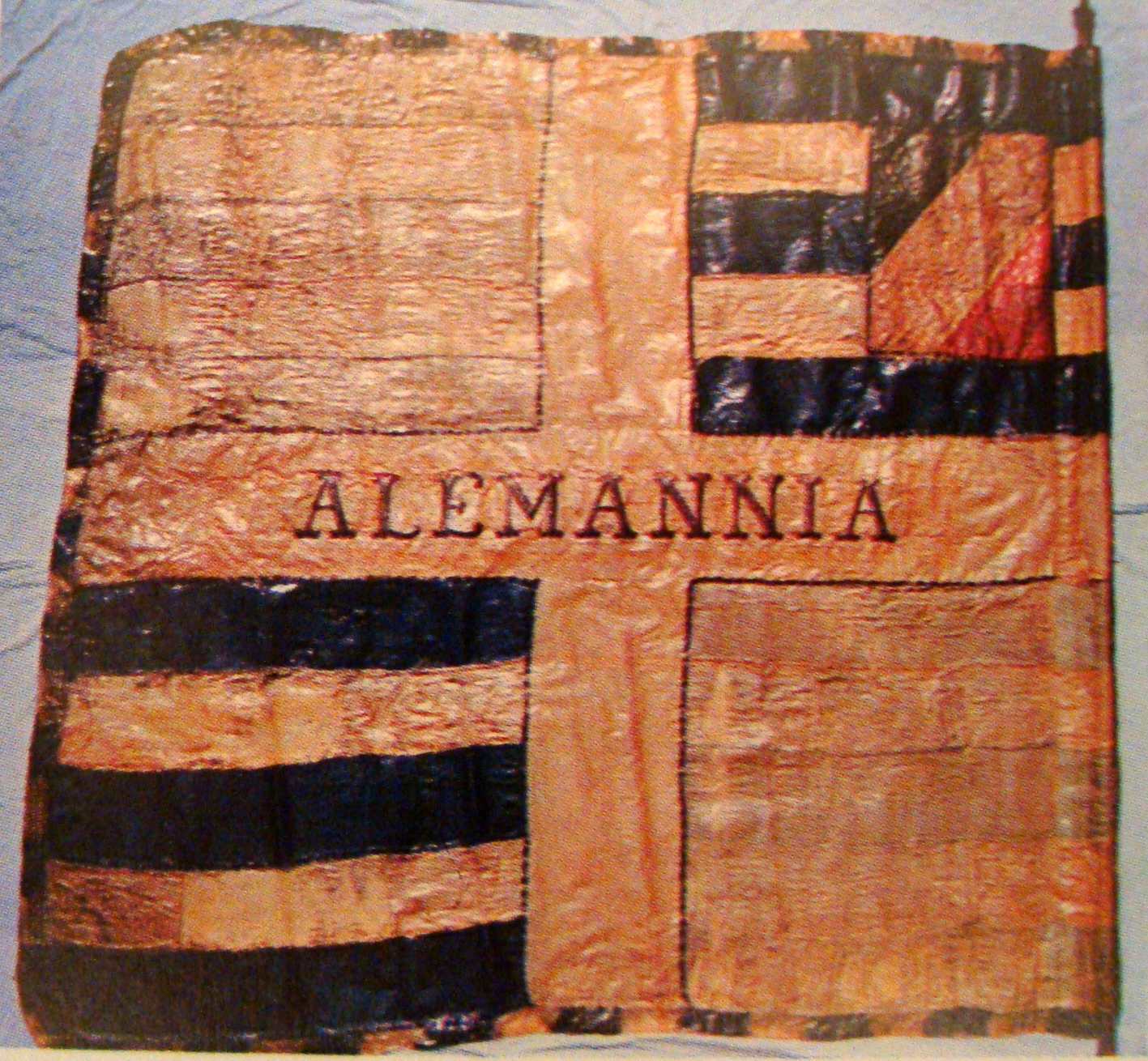
First flag of AKV Alemannia, 1895

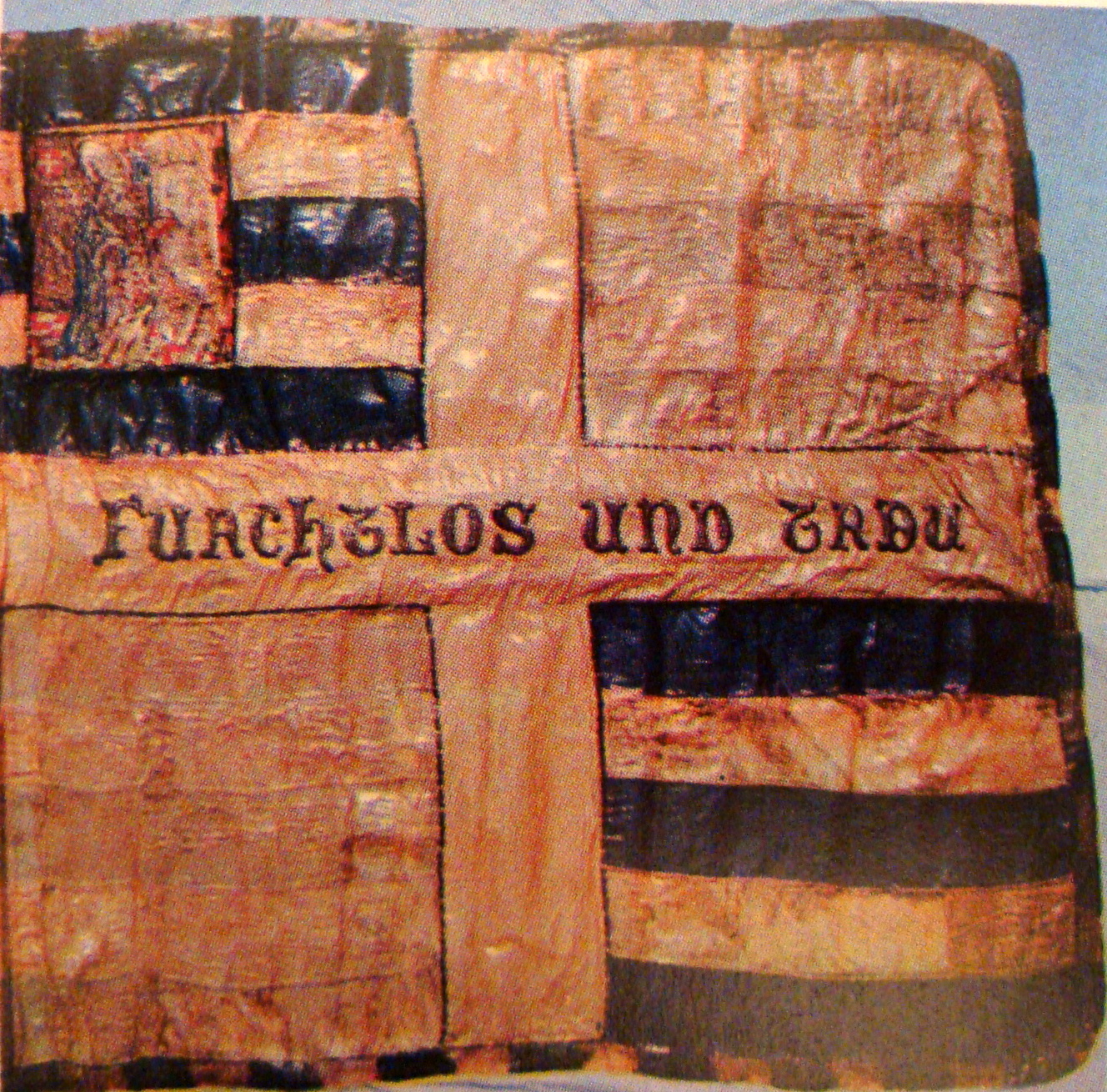
First flag of AKV Alemannia (verso inscription reads furchtlos und treu "fearless and fidel").

The following is an incomplete list of fraternities or Studentenverbindungen in Switzerland, listed with foundation date and home university. Most of these societies are members of a federation of societies such as the Schweizerischer Studentenverein (Schw. StV)/Société des Étudiants Suisses (SES) or have subsections at more than one university as the Zofingerverein does.

- GV Agaunia, 1859, Collège de la Royale Abbaye de Saint-Maurice
- AKV Alemannia, 1895, Fribourg
- Société de Belles Lettres in Lausanne, Geneva, Neuchatel and Bruxelles (Belgium) it's the first Student Society created in Switzerland
- AV Berchtoldia, Berne
- K.St.V. Carolingia-Fribourg, 1929, Fribourg
- GV Corvina Einsiedeln, 1848, Stiftsschule Einsiedeln
- AV Fryburgia, 1918, University of Fribourg
- AV Goten, 1953, Fribourg
- Société d’Étudiants Germania Lausanne, 1887, Lausanne
- Schweizerische Studentenverbindung Helvetia, 1832, founded in Lucerne, today with sections in Basel, Berne, Geneva, Lausanne and Zürich
- AV Kybelia, 1999, St. Gallen
- AKV Kyburger, 1912, Zürich
- AV Leonina, 1896, Fribourg
- AKV Neu-Romania, 1938 (split off Alemannia), Fribourg
- AV Notkeriana, 1990, St. Gallen
- AV Orion, 1964, Zürich
- AKV Rauracia, 1863, Basel
- CA Rezia, 1957, Fribourg
- SA Sarinia, 1895, Fribourg
- AV Semper Fidelis Luzern, 1843, Lucerne
- AV Staufer, 1937, Fribourg
- AV Steinacher, 1953, St. Gallen
- Studentengesangverein Zürich ("Zürcher Singstudenten), 1849, Zurich
- Corps Tigurinia Zürich, 1850, Zürich
- AV Turicia, 1860
- Valdesia in Lausanne
- AV Waldstättia, 1891, Lucerne
- Schweizerischer Zofingerverein, 1819, eight universities, the oldest fraternity in Switzerland.
- Wengia Solodorensis, 1884, Solothurn
- Zofingia

The societies are traditionally categorized by their stance towards academic fencing. There are four categories:

- pflichtschlagend (fencing bouts are obligatory)
- fakultativ schlagend (training sessions in fencing are obligatory, but not participation in actual fencing bouts)
- frei schlagend (both fencing practice and duels are allowed but not required of members)
- nichtschlagend (no fencing).

Those Swiss societies which practice fencing are united in the Schweizerischer Waffenring. Some examples of "pflichtschlagenden Studentenverbindungen" in Switzerland today are AT Alemannia (Basel), AT Utonia (Zürich) or AT Rhenania (Bern). Schweizerische Studentenverbindung Helvetia is unique in that its German-speaking sections practice fencing while its French-speaking ones do not. The Schweizerischer Studentenverein decided during the second half of the 19th century to forbid fencing to its members due to reasons of religion. Duelling was and still is seen as contrary to Christian values on which this Federation is based.
