= Martin Disteli =

Swiss painter (1802-1844)

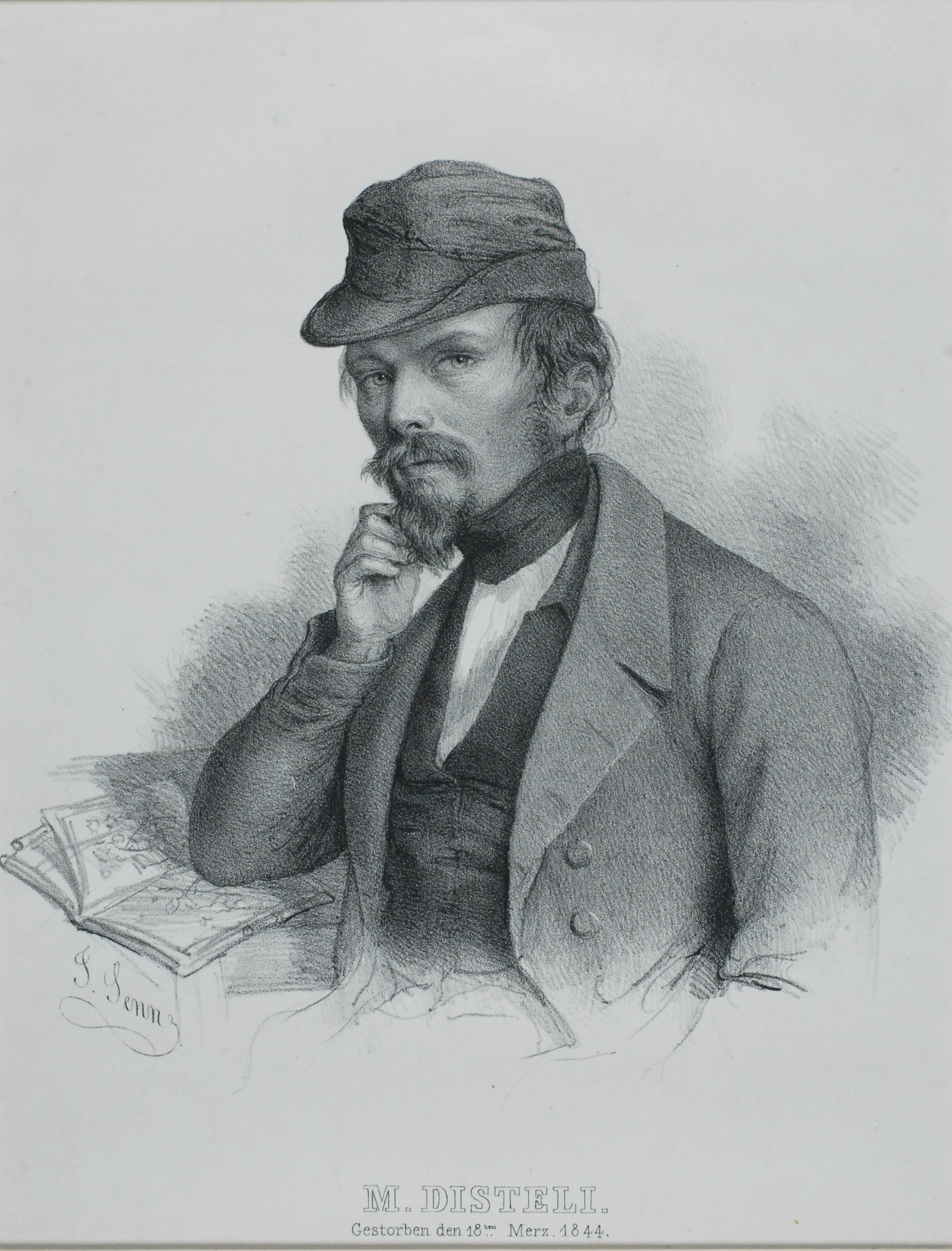
- Portrait of Disteli by Joachim Senn
- Born: 28 May 1802; Olten, Switzerland
- Died: 18 March 1844 (aged 41); Solothurn, Switzerland
- Known for: Painting, caricature, illustration

Martin Disteli (28 May 1802 – 18 March 1844) was a Swiss painter, caricaturist and illustrator known for his liberal political satire. His work combined art and political commentary, most notably through the Schweizer Bilderkalender, later known as the Distelikalender.

== Biography ==
Martin Disteli was born on 28 May 1802 in Olten. His parents were Urs Martin Disteli, a wealthy silk manufacturer, and Anna Maria Kümmerli. Disteli attended the college in Solothurn from 1817 and studied in Lucerne from 1819 to 1821, where he was associated with the liberal student society Zofingia.

Disteli pursued humanities studies in Freiburg im Breisgau and Jena from 1821 to 1823. In Jena, his caricatures brought him notice, and he became involved with liberal student circles. He was a member of a student fraternity. While there, Disteli took part in a public insult directed at Johann Wolfgang von Goethe. In 1823, he was expelled from the university and forced to return to Switzerland.

Back in Olten, Disteli initially sought a post as a court clerk, but soon turned to art. He then began working as a draughtsman and illustrator without formal academic art training. He also gave drawing lessons without pay for several years. In 1825–1826, he trained in Munich under Peter von Cornelius. During this period, Disteli became acquainted with French graphic art through satirical periodicals.

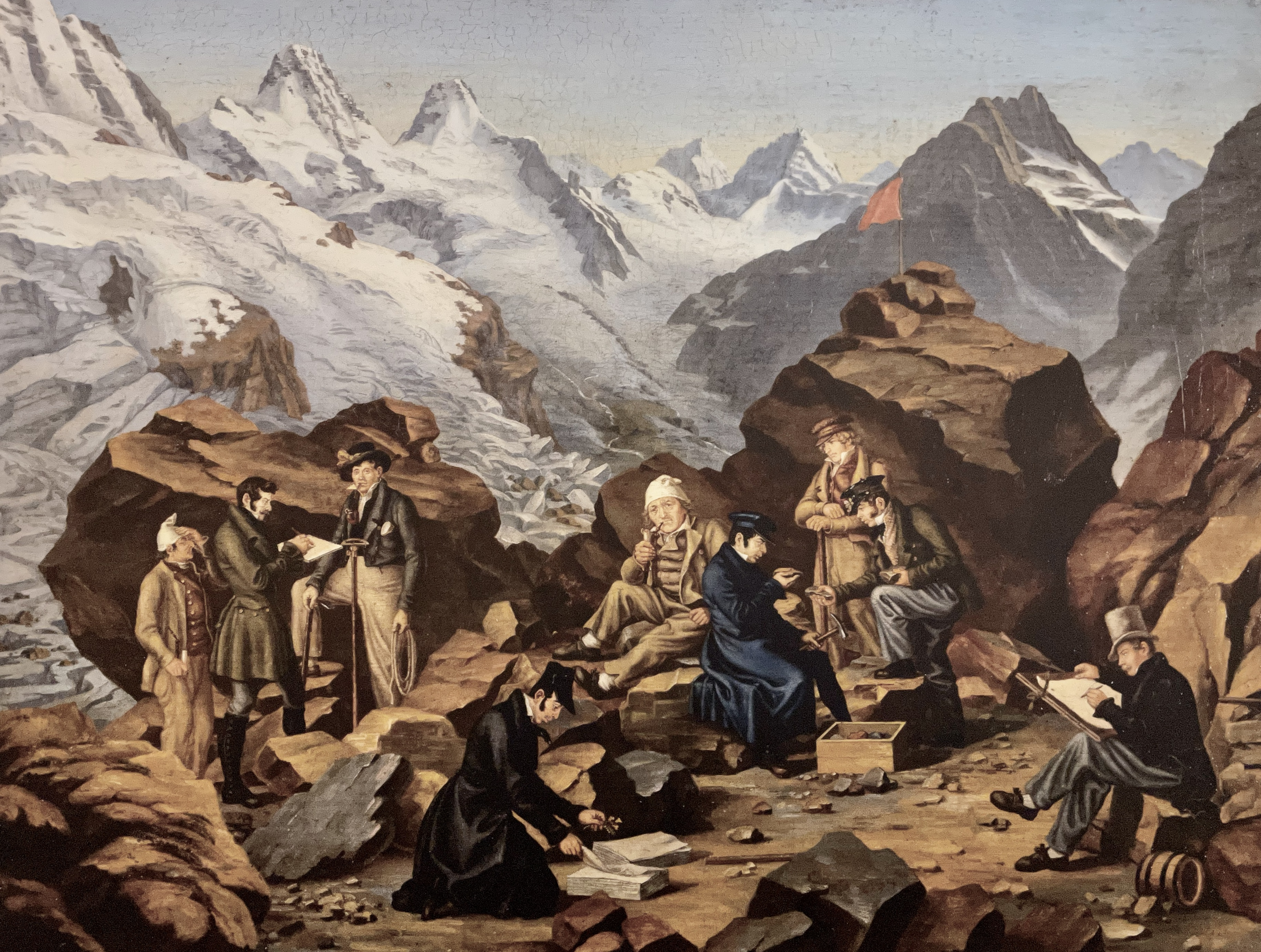
Franz Joseph Hugi and his companions in the Rottal, painted by Disteli

In 1827, Disteli unsuccessfully applied for a drawing-teaching post at the college in Solothurn. In 1828, he married Theresia Gisiger of Hauenstein. Around 1829, he accompanied the naturalist Franz Joseph Hugi on a journey through the Bernese Oberland, where he produced detailed mountain landscapes.

The failure of his father’s business in 1829, together with the need to support his ill wife, left Disteli dependent on whatever work he could obtain. Despite his anticlerical views, he even accepted commissions for church paintings. In 1830, Disteli took an active role in the liberal political change in Solothurn. The following year, he served as captain of a volunteer rifle company during the fighting in Basel-Landschaft, and became a member of the Olten city council. His wife died in 1831.

Disteli became a colonel in 1834. From that year, he lived in Solothurn, where he was appointed drawing teacher at the cantonal school in 1836. Disteli died in Solothurn on 18 March 1844.

== Work ==
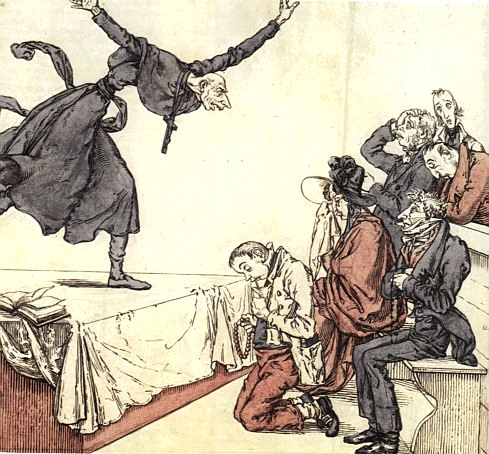
A Zealot's Sermon, an anticlerical caricature (1834)

In 1829, Disteli published Umrisse zu A. E. Fröhlichs Fabeln, a series of ten etchings. His style was shaped by Peter von Cornelius and Moritz Retzsch, while his imagery drew on the work of the French illustrator Grandville.

From 1830 to 1839, Disteli contributed illustrations to Alpenrosen, a Swiss annual, as well as to several liberal political periodicals. His work included caricatures of aristocrats and clergy, along with patriotic scenes from Swiss history. He also illustrated F. J. Hugi’s Naturhistorische Alpenreise (1830), E. Münch's Pantheon der Geschichte des Teutschen Volkes, and Morgenstern (1836). His drawings frequently addressed Swiss history and contemporary political conflict from a liberal and anticlerical perspective.

From 1839 to 1844, Disteli published the Schweizer Bilderkalender. The publication became known as the Distelikalender and served as a vehicle for his continued opposition to conservative politics. Unlike his earlier work in books and almanacs, the Distelikalender was intended for a wider audience, particularly rural readers. It featured political caricature, historical scenes, contemporary events and satirical verse. He illustrated it with lithographs and woodcuts. From 1842, political caricature became increasingly prominent. The Distelikalender was banned in Lucerne.

His later work included illustrations for G. A. Bürger’s Abentheuern des Freiherrn von Münchhausen (1841), drawings for Geschichte des deutschen Michels (1843) and Reineke Fuchs, and illustrations for poems by Goethe and Uhland.

== Legacy ==
Olten mayor Jakob Benedikt Schmid bequeathed 150 works by Disteli from his private collection to the Disteli and Museum Fund. The donation formed the basis of today's Disteli collection and contributed significantly to the establishment of the Kunstmuseum Olten. His works are also held in the Kunstmuseum Solothurn and the Graphische Sammlung of ETH Zurich.

== Gallery ==
Title page for Umrisse zu A. E. Fröhlichs Fabeln (1829)

Junker-Lieutenant, caricature (1829)

Ja, ja! – die schwarze Vögel! – die habe uns viel Wust gmacht, satire (1839)

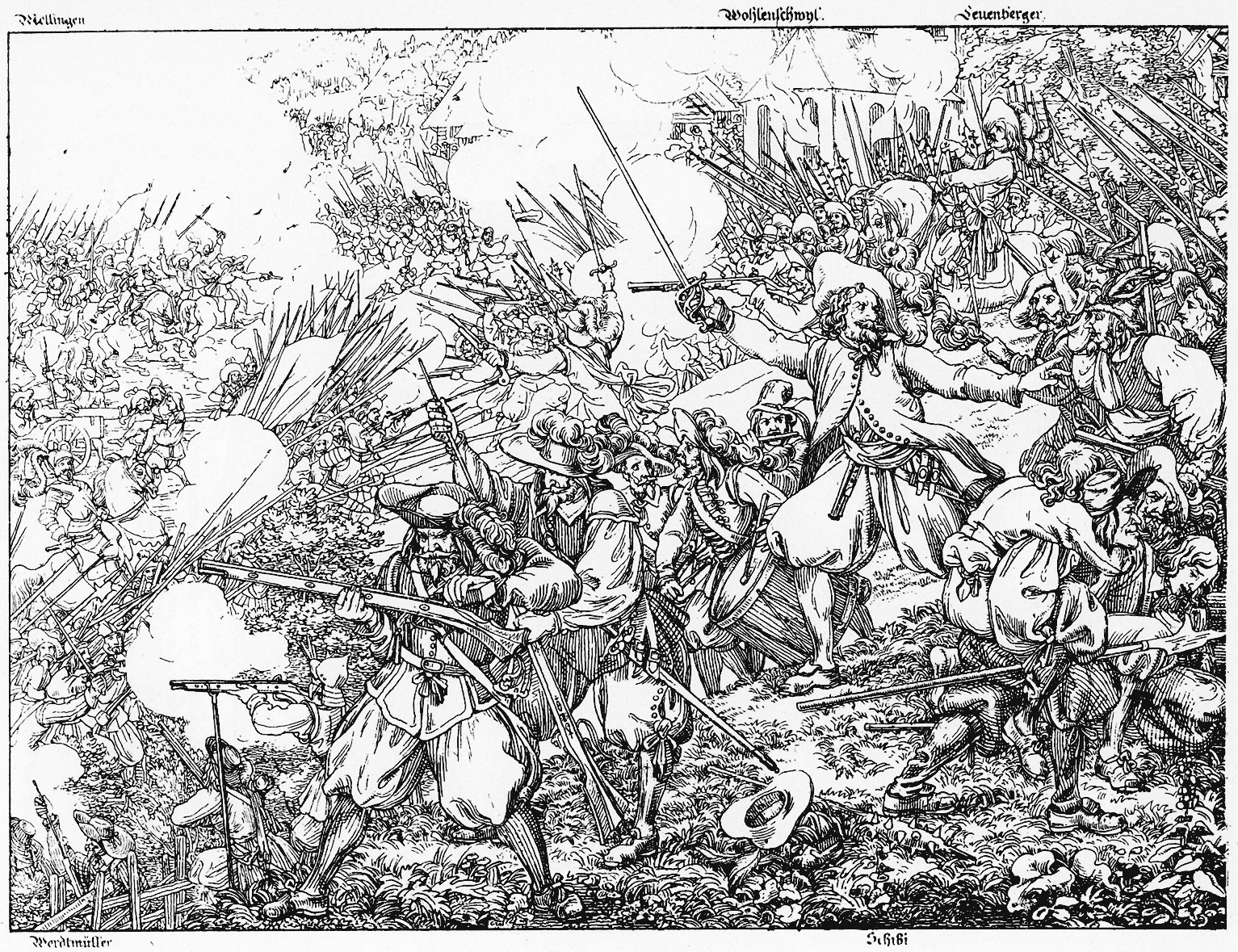
Battle at Wohlenschwil, from the Distelikalender (1839)

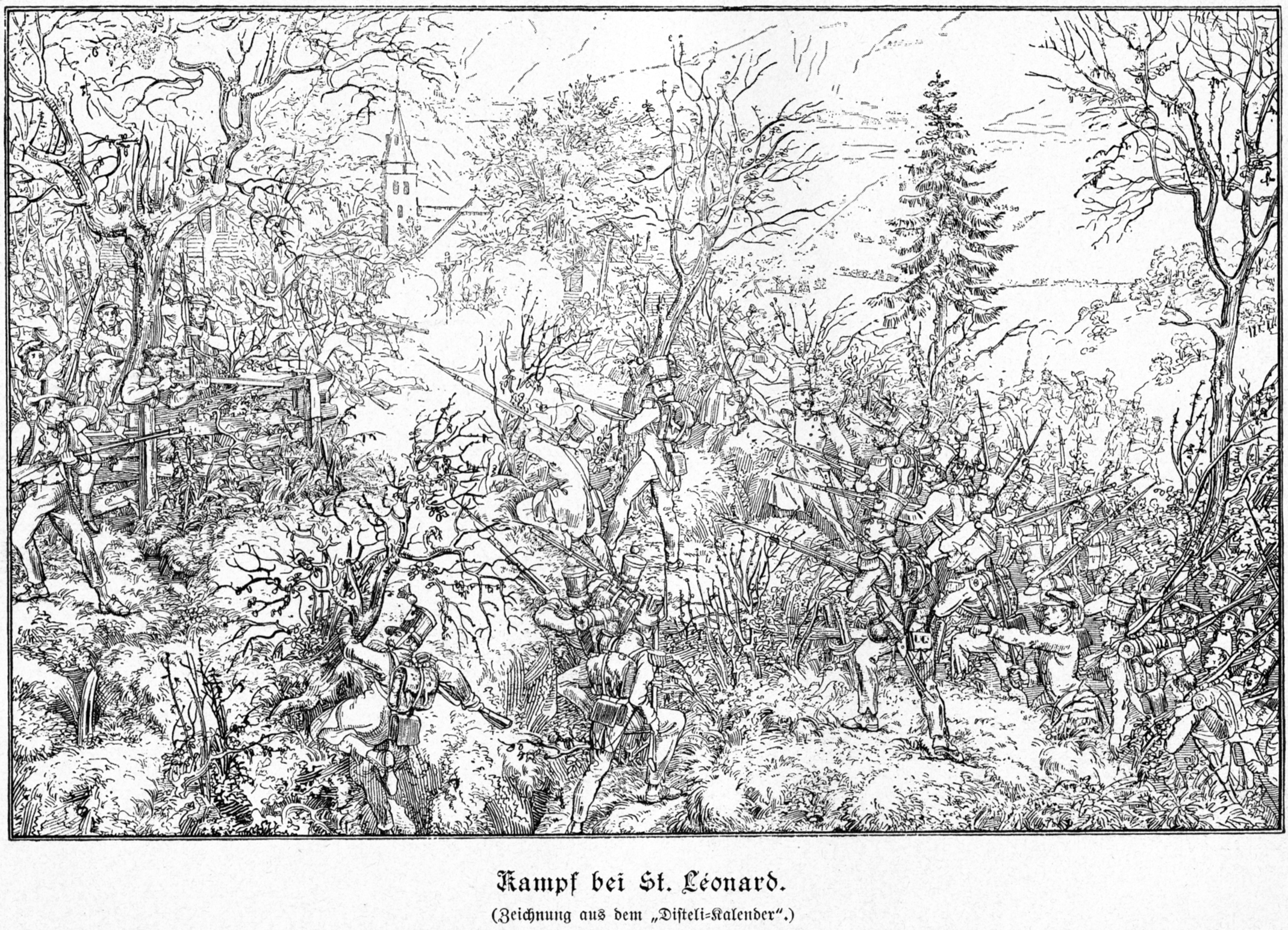
Battle at St. Léonard, from the Distelikalender (1840)

Title page for the Münchhausen illustrations (1841)
