= Tour d'Egypte =

Egyptian multi-day road cycling race

Race details
- Date: Mid-February
- Region: Egypt
- Discipline: Road
- Competition: UCI Africa Tour
- Type: Stage race

History
- First edition: 1954
- Editions: 28 (as of 2016)
- First winner: René Van Meenen (BEL)
- Most wins: Urs Dietschi (SUI) (2 Wins) Amr Elnady (EGY) (2 Wins)
- Most recent: Polychronis Tzortzakis (GRE)

Tour d'Egypte is a professional road cycling stage race held annually each February in Egypt. Tour d'Egypte is part of the UCI Africa Tour.

== Winners ==
Year	Country	Rider	Team
1954	Belgium	René Van Meenen	
1955	Denmark	Hans Edmund Andresen	
1956	Bulgaria	Nentcho Christov	
1957	Germany	Werner Malitz	
1958	Soviet Union	Anatolij Olizarenko	
1959	Germany	Gerard Löffler	
1960	Germany	Kurt Müller	
1961	Poland	Andrzej Piechaczek	
1962	Germany	Lothar Appler	
1963–1974	No race		
1975	Switzerland	Urs Dietschi	
1976	Switzerland	Urs Dietschi	
1977–1985	No race		
1986	Soviet Union	Gintautas Umaras	
1987–1995	No race		
1996	Ukraine	Yuri Sinoukov	
1997	Russia	Sergei Sinyukov	
1998	Kazakhstan	Vadim Kravchenko	
1999	Egypt	Amr Elnady	
2000	Lithuania	Remigius Lupeikis	
2001	Egypt	Amr Elnady	
2002	Slovakia	Radovan Husar	Slovakia (national team)
2003	South Africa	Tiaan Kannemeyer	Barloworld.com
2004	Slovakia	Maroš Kovác	Dukla Trencin
2005	Kazakhstan	Sergey Tretyakov	Kazakhstan (national team)
2006	Kazakhstan	Ilya Chernyshov	Cycling Team Capec
2007	South Africa	Waylon Woolcock	South Africa (national team)
2008	South Africa	Jay Robert Thomson	Team MTN
2009	Germany	Christoph Springer	Heraklion-Nessebar
2010–2014	No race		
2015	Spain	Francisco Mancebo	Skydive Dubai–Al Ahli Pro Cycling Team
2016	Morocco	Mounir Makhchoun	Morocco (national team)
2017–2018	No race		
2019	Greece	Polychronis Tzortzakis	Tarteletto–Isorex
