= Schweizerischer Studentenverein =

Swiss organization of student societies

Schweizerischer Studentenverein (Swiss Student's Society)
- SSS
- Founded: August 31, 1841; 184 years ago Switzerland
- Type: Umbrella
- Affiliation: EKV
- Status: Active
- Emphasis: Federation of Studentenverbindungen
- Scope: International
- Motto: Virtus, scientia, amicitia!
- Colors: Red, White, and Green
- Symbol: Red hat
- Chapters: 69
- Members: 1100 active 7,500 lifetime
- Nickname: Schw. StV (SES; SSS)
- Headquarters: Heinz Germann v/o Salopp; Swiss Student Association; Gerliswilstrasse 71; PO Box CH-602; Emmenbrücke; Switzerland
- Website: www.schw-stv.ch

The Schweizerischer Studentenverein (Swiss Student's Society, abbreviation SSS; French: Société des Étudiants Suisses) is a society of colour-bearing students of both genders and at the same time a federation of student corporations which are called sections. Its members are students and former students of high schools, universities and universities of applied sciences in Switzerland, Germany, Austria and Italy. Formerly, sections also existed in Belgium, France and in the Czech Republic.

== History ==
The Schweizerischer Studentenverein (SSS) was founded on August 31, 1841, as the federation of the Catholic-conservative, color-bearing, and non-dueling corporations of Switzerland.The first four sections were founded in 1843: GV Zähringia (in Fribourg), GV Suitia (in Schwyz), AV Semper Fidelis (Lucerne), and AV Helvetia Friburgensis (Freiburg im Breisgau).

There are not only sections in German-speaking regions, but also in French-speaking Switzerland and in other countries. Originally, the SSS was a political movement of Catholic-conservative students and therefore implicitly the antipode of the Schweizerischer Zofingerverein, which had a progressive-liberal political setting. The SSS intended to gather Christian, conservative forces against liberalism and radicalism. Nevertheless, after the Sonderbund War of 1847, it was members of the SSS who contributed to Switzerland's unity.

The SSS was always meant to be a society of politically active members. Nearly all members of the Swiss Federal Council of the CVP were members of the SSS. This orientation to catholic conservatism diminished more and more since 1970. Officially, the SSS is no longer affiliated with the CVP and nowadays is open to other political parties.

The SSS has a friendship agreement with the CV and the OCV. It is a member of the EKV.

== Symbols ==
The motto of SSS is Virtus, scientia, amicitia! Its colors are red, white, and green. Its symbol is the red hat. The member corporations are free to choose any shade of red and the type of hat.

== Membership ==
In 1873, during the time of the Kulturkampf, the SSS became a society limited to Catholics. This was changed to "Christian" in 1977. Consequently, the SSS is now also open to Protestants. Women are allowed to join the society as of 1968.

== Organisation ==
As of today, the SSS has 69 sections in Switzerland, Germany, Austria, and Italy. This makes it the biggest society of colour-bearing students in Switzerland. It has 1100 active members and 7500 veterans.

The SSS was founded as a central society, not as a fusion of individual corporations, which is why their members are directly members of the federation as well, including the right to vote. The supreme organ of the SSS is its General Assembly (consisting of all active members), which is held annually at the so-called Zentralfest ("central festival"), the biggest festival of colour-bearing students in Europe.

The General Assembly elects the five members of the Central Committee (CC), including the Central President (CP), the Central Actuary (CA), the Vice President (VCP), the ombudsman of the universities of applied science (FHCC,) and the ombudsman of the high schools. The members are elected for one year; reelection is possible but not frequent. There are several permanent and temporary commissions to support the CC. The veterans are federated in the Altherrenbund (AHB), which has its own committee. The AHB and the CC are united in the Council of the SSS. Each member of the CC and the AHB has one vote; however, in case of equality of votes, the CC (as the committee of the students) prevails.

== Member corporations ==
In total, there are at least 113 corporations that were at sometime a member of the SSS. There are three types of corporations: Gymnasialverbindung (High School Corporation), Ingenieursverbindung (Engineering Corporation), and Akademische Verbindung (Academic Corporation).

Organizations fall under a predicate, including:

- Gymnasialverbindung (High School Corporation)
- Akademische Verbindung (Academic Corporation)
- Akademische Kommentverbindung (Academic Comment Corporation)
- Fachhochschulverbindung (Corporation at a University of Applied Science)
- Semiakademische Verbindung (Semi-Academic Corporation)
- Akademische Burschenschaft (German-speaking Academic Corporation)
- Regionalverbindung (Regional Corporation, not affiliated to a university)

=== Active sections ===
The following 59 sections have active and veteran members.

Letters	Corporation	Chartered	Type	Predicate	Language	Gender	Country
GR	Greviria Bulle	1989	High School	Gymnasialverbindung	French	Male and female	Switzerland
AW	Abbatia Wilensis Wil	1978	High School	Gymnasialverbindung	German	Male and female	Switzerland
AC	Activitas Fribourg	1917	High School	Fachhochschulverbindung	French	Male and female	Switzerland
AG	Agaunia Saint-Maurice	1859	High School	Gymnasialverbindung	French	Male and female	Switzerland
AL	AKV Alemannia Fribourg	1895	Academic	Akademische Kommentverbindung	German	Male	Switzerland
AM	Angelomontana Engelberg	1907	High School	Gymnasialverbindung	German	Male and female	Switzerland
AR	Arvésia Geneva	1946	High School	Gymnasialverbindung	French	Male	Switzerland
BE	Berchtoldia Bern	1917	Academic	Akademische Verbindung	German	Male and female	Switzerland
BV	Berovia Beromünster	1983	High School	Gymnasialverbindung	German	Male and female	Switzerland
BO	Bodania Sankt Gallen	1925	Academic	Akademische Verbindung	German	Male	Switzerland
BR	Brigensis Brig	1843	High School	Gymnasialverbindung	German	Male and female	Switzerland
BU	Burgundia Bern	1865	Academic	Akademische Kommentverbindung	German	Male	Switzerland
CS	Corona Sangallensis St. Gallen	1896	High School	Semiakademische Verbindung	German	Male	Switzerland
CO	Corvina Einsiedeln	1848	High School	Gymnasialverbindung	German	Male and female	Switzerland
CU	Curiensis Chur	1848	Academic	Akademische Verbindung	German	Male	Switzerland
DE	Desertina Disentis	1990	High School	Gymnasialverbindung	German	Male and female	Switzerland
GU	Die Gundoldinger Lucerne	1958	Academic	Akademische Verbindung	German	Male and female	Switzerland
HA	Die Habsburger Brugg/Windisch	1966	Engineering	Fachhochschulverbindung	German	Male	Switzerland
NO	Die Nothensteiner St. Gallen	1984	Engineering	Fachhochschulverbindung	German	Male	Switzerland
?	Fidelitas Schaffhausen	2005	High School	Gymnasialverbindung	German	Male and female	Switzerland
FB	Froburger Basel	1939	Academic	Akademische Verbindung	German	Male and female	Switzerland
FR	Fryburgia Fribourg	1918	Academic	Akademische Verbindung	German	Male	Switzerland
GL	Glanzenburger Zurich	1959	Academic	Akademische Burschenschaft	German	Male	Switzerland
GO	Goten Fribourg	1953	Academic	Akademische Verbindung	German	Male and female	Switzerland
HF	Helvetia Friburgensis Freiburg im Breisgau	1843	Academic	Akademische Verbindung	German	Male and female	Germany
HO	Helvetia Oenipontana Innsbruck	1860	Academic	Akademische Verbindung	German	Male and female	Austria
HR	Helvetia Romana Rome	1850	Academic	Akademische Verbindung	German	Male and female	Italy
KB	Kybelia St. Gallen	1999	Academic	Akademische Verbindung	German	Female	Switzerland
KY	Kyburger Zurich	1912	Academic	Akademische Kommentverbindung	German	Male	Switzerland
LE	Lémania Lausanne	1891	Academic	Akademische Verbindung	French	Male and female	Switzerland
LN	Leonina Fribourg	1896	Academic	Akademische Verbindung	German	Male and female	Switzerland
MA	Markovia Wangen	1965	High School	Regionalverbindung	German	Male and female	Switzerland
MP	Monte Pacis Gossau	1998	High School	Gymnasialverbindung	German	Female	Switzerland
MU	Munatia Basel	1991	High School	Gymnasialverbindung	German	Male and female	Switzerland
NR	Neu-Romania Fribourg	1938	Academic	Akademische Kommentverbindung	German	Male	Switzerland
NK	Notkeriana St. Gallen	1990	Academic	Akademische Verbindung	German	Male and female	Switzerland
NU	Nuithonia Fribourg	1845	High School	Gymnasialverbindung	French	Male and female	Switzerland
OR	Orion Zurich	1964	Academic	Akademische Verbindung	German	Male and female	Switzerland
?	Palatia Solodorensis Solothurn	1955	High School	Gymnasialverbindung	German	Male and female	Switzerland
PT	Penthesilea Appenzell	1993	High School	Gymnasialverbindung	German	Female	Switzerland
RA	Rauracia Basel	1863	Academic	Akademische Kommentverbindung	German	Male	Switzerland
RE	Rezia Fribourg	1939	Academic	Akademische Verbindung	Romanish	Male and female	Switzerland
RO	Rotacher Appenzell	1941	High School	Gymnasialverbindung	German	Male	Switzerland
RS	Rusana Altdorf	1918	High School	Gymnasialverbindung	German	Male and female	Switzerland
SL	Salévia Geneva	1876	Academic	Akademische Verbindung	French	Male	Switzerland
SA	Sarinia Fribourg	1895	Academic	Akademische Verbindung	French	Male and female	Switzerland
SE	Seetalensis Hochdorf	1975	Academic	Semiakademische Verbindung	German	Male	Switzerland
SF	Semper Fidelis Lucerne	1843	Academic	Akademische Verbindung	German	Male	Switzerland
ST	Staufer Fribourg	1937	Academic	Akademische Verbindung	German	Male and female	Switzerland
SR	Steinacher St. Gallen	1953	Academic	Akademische Verbindung	German	Male	Switzerland
SH	Struthonia Stans	1909	High School	Gymnasialverbindung	German	Male and female	Switzerland
SB	Subsilvania Sarnen	1860	High School	Gymnasialverbindung	German	Male and female	Switzerland
SU	Suitia Schwyz	1843	High School	Gymnasialverbindung	German	Male	Switzerland
SA	Surlacia Sursee	1991	High School	Gymnasialverbindung	German	Male and female	Switzerland
TU	Turicia Zurich	1860	Academic	Akademische Verbindung	German	Male	Switzerland
WA	Waldstättia Lucerne	1891	Academic	Akademische Verbindung	German	Male and female	Switzerland
WE	Welfen Zurich	1921	Academic	Akademische Verbindung	German	Male and female	Switzerland
WI	Wikinger Immensee	1967	High School	Gymnasialverbindung	German	Male and female	Switzerland
ZÄ	Zähringia Fribourg	1843	High School	Gymnasialverbindung	German	Male and female	Switzerland

=== Semi-active sections ===
The following 21 sections have no active members, but still have veteran members.

Letters	Corporation	Chartered	Type	Predicate	Language	Gender	Country
AF	Agorà Fribourg	1971	Academic	Akademische Verbindung	German	Male and female	Switzerland
AR	Ardevensia Sion	1988	High School	Gymnasialverbindung	French	Male and female	Switzerland
AS	Aster Fribourg	1967	High School	Gymnasialverbindung	French	Male and female	Switzerland
AU	Audacia Pfäffikon	1994	High School	Gymnasialverbindung	German	Male	Switzerland
DA	Daltonia Muttenz	1976	Engineering	Fachhochschulverbindung	German	Male	Switzerland
RU	Die Ruithonen Burgdorf	1900	Engineering	Fachhochschulverbindung	German	Male	Switzerland
HM	Helvetia Monacensis Munich	1844	Academic	Akademische Verbindung	German	Male	Germany
HL	Helvetia Lovaniensis Leuven	1872	Academic	Akademische Verbindung	German and French	Male and female	Belgium
HI	Himeria Porrentruy	1925	High School	Gymnasialverbindung	French	Male and female	Switzerland
	Lepontia Bernensis Bern	1931				Male	Switzerland
LC	Lepontia Cantonale Locarno (Lucerne)	1885	Academic	Akademische Verbindung	Italian	Male	Switzerland
NN	Neuburgia Neuchâtel	1995	Academic	Akademische Verbindung	French	Male and female	Switzerland
NW	Neu-Welfen Zurich	1946	Academic	Akademische Verbindung	German	Male	Switzerland
PH	Paludia Heerbrugg	1991	High School	Gymnasialverbindung	German	Male and female	Switzerland
RH	Rhodania Sion	1846	High School	Gymnasialverbindung	French	Male and female	Switzerland
RT	Romania Turicensis (Zurich)	1930	Academic	Akademische Verbindung	French	Male	Switzerland
	Romania Bernensis (Bern)	1945		Akademische Verbindung	French	Male	Switzerland
SJ	Sancta Johanna Fribourg	2003	Academic	Akademische Verbindung	French	Male and female	Switzerland
SN	Saruna Sargans	1992	High School	Gymnasialverbindung	German	Male and female	Switzerland
TR	Turania Winterthur	1892	High School	Fachhochschulverbindung	German	Male	Switzerland

=== Inactive sections ===
The following sections are inactive and do not have any active or veteran members.

Letters	Corporation	Chartered	Type	Predicate	Language	Gender	Country
	Adelphia Bellinzona	1968	High School	Gymnasialverbindung	German		Switzerland
	Augusta Turin	1888	Academic	Akademische Verbindung	German		Italy
	Blarentia Pruntrut	1931	High School	Gymnasialverbindung	German		Switzerland
	Helvetia Eystettensis Eichstätt	1895	Academic	Akademische Verbindung	German		Germany
	Helvetia Herbipolensis Würzburg	1888	Academic	Akademische Verbindung	German		Germany
	Helvetia Lipsiensis Leipzig	1902	Academic	Akademische Verbindung	German		Germany
	Helvetia Mediolanensis Milano	1967	Academic	Akademische Verbindung	German		Italy
	Helvetia Tubingensis Tübingen	1975	Academic	Akademische Verbindung	German		Germany
	Helvetia Westfalensis Münster	1914	Academic	Akademische Verbindung	German		Germany
	Justiniana Sion	1901	Academic	Akademische Verbindung	German		Switzerland
	Laudania Lucerne	1976	High School	Gymnasialverbindung	German		Switzerland
	Leonia Como	1895	Academic	Akademische Verbindung	German		Italy
LF	Lepontia Friburgensis Fribourg		Academic	Akademische Verbindung	Italian	Male and female	Switzerland
	Petromariana Delle	1901	High School	Gymnasialverbindung	German		France
	Salésia Evian-les-Bains	1882	High School	Gymnasialverbindung	French		France
	Sektion Luzern	1849	High School		French		Switzerland
	Sektion Chur	1878	High School		German		Switzerland
	Sektion Dillingen	1877	Academic		German		Germany
	Sektion Frauenfeld	1861	High School		German		Switzerland
	Sektion Grosser Sankt Bernhard	1871	High School		French		Switzerland
	Sektion Heidelberg	1877	Academic		German		Germany
	Sektion Mainz	1871	Academic		German		Germany
	Sektion Mariastein	1874	High School		German		Switzerland
	Sektion Monza	1866	Academic		German		Italy
	Sektion Paris	1878	Academic		German		France
	Sektion Prag	1864	Academic		German		Czecholslavakia
	Sektion Strassburg	1877	Academic		German		Germany, now France
	Sektion Thonon	1891	High School		German		France
	Sektion Zug	1858	High School		German		Switzerland
	Sinceritas Biel	1910	Engineering		German		Switzerland
	Valeria Florens Sion	1892	Academic	Akademische Verbindung	German		Switzerland
	Vigilia Fribourg	1933	Academic	Akademische Verbindung	French		Switzerland

== Notable members ==
=== Engineering and math ===
- Pierre Hemmer, electronics engineer and business executive, founder of MC Management et Communications SA
- Michel Plancherel, Mathematician

=== Law ===
- Giusep Nay, president of the Federal Supreme Court of Switzerland

=== Politicians ===
- Viola Amherd, member of the Swiss Federal Council
- Roger Bonvin, member of the Swiss Federal Council
- Achille Casanova, Vice-Chancellor of Switzerland
- Enrico Celio, member of the Swiss Federal Council
- Flavio Cotti, member of the Swiss Federal Council
- Dominique de Buman, President of the National Council (Switzerland)
- Anton Cottier, member of the Great Council of Friebourg, senate, and president of HC Fribourg-Gottéron SA
- Alphons Egli, member of the Swiss Federal Council
- Josef Escher, member of the Swiss Federal Council
- Philipp Etter, member of the Swiss Federal Council
- Bruno Frick, member and president of the Swiss Council of States
- Kurt Furgler, member of the Swiss Federal Council
- Thomas Holenstein, member of the Swiss Federal Council
- Hans Hürlimann, member of the Swiss Federal Council
- Arnold Koller, member of the Swiss Federal Council
- Doris Leuthard, member of the Swiss Federal Council
- Ruth Metzler, member of the Swiss Federal Council
- Giuseppe Motta, member of the Swiss Federal Council
- Jean-Marie Musy, member of the Swiss Federal Council
- Carlo Schmid-Sutter, member and president of the Swiss Council of States
- Ludwig von Moos, member of the Swiss Federal Council
- Josef Zemp, member of the Swiss Federal Council

=== Religion ===
- Daniel Anrig, Commandant of the Pontifical Swiss Guards
- Roman Bannwart, theologian and musician
- Norbert Brunner, Catholic Bishop of Sion
- Felix Gmür, Roman Catholic bishop
- Benno Gut, Roman Catholic Cardinal
- Kurt Koch, Roman Catholic Bishop of Basel
- Hans Küng, theologian
- Elmar Mäder, Commandant of the Pontifical Swiss Guards
- Gaspard Mermillod, Cardinal and bishop of the Roman Catholic Church
- Henri Schwery, Roman Catholic Cardinal and Bishop of Sion
- Reinhold Stecher, Roman Cahtolic Bishop of Innsbruck
- Maurice Tornay (GV Agaunia), Augustinian missionary and martyr
