= Christoph Springer =

German cyclist

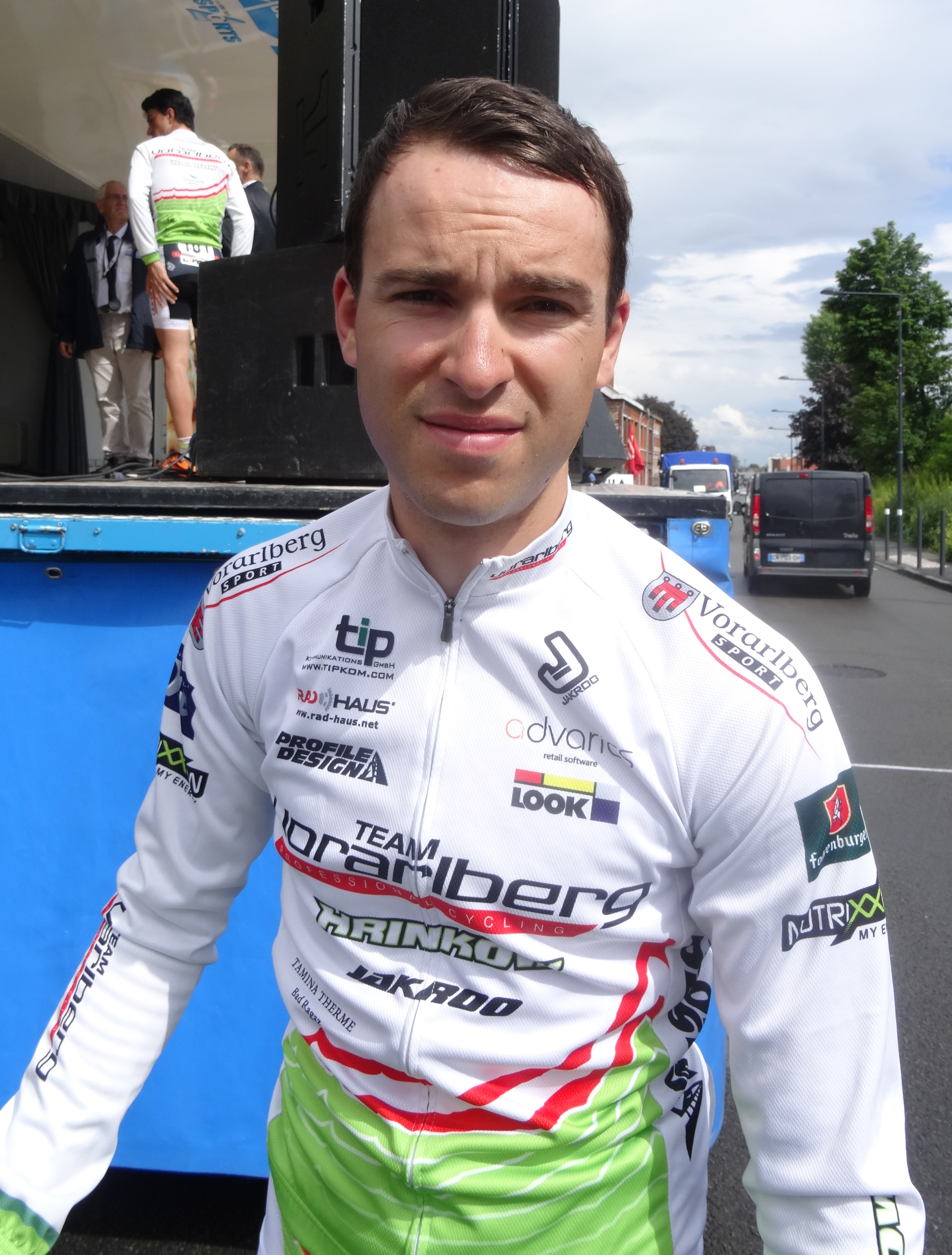

Personal information
- Born: 30 October 1985 (age 40) Oberndorf am Neckar, Germany

Cycling career
- Sport: Cycling
- Current team: Retired
- Discipline: Road
- Role: Rider

Professional teams
- 2008–2009: Cosmote Kastro
- 2010–2011: SP Tableware
- 2012: Specialized Concept Store
- 2013–2015: Team Vorarlberg

Christoph Springer (born 30 October 1985 in Oberndorf am Neckar) is a German former cyclist.

== Major results ==
2009
1st Overall Tour d'Egypte
2011
2nd Overall Tour d'Indonesia
9th Overall Tour of Szeklerland
10th Overall Sibiu Cycling Tour
2012
7th Overall La Tropicale Amissa Bongo
7th Overall Tour of Bulgaria
