= Saudi Tour =

Annual professional road bicycle racing stage race

Race details
- Date: Early February
- Region: Saudi Arabia
- Discipline: Road
- Competition: UCI Asia Tour (2020-2025); UCI ProSeries (2026-)
- Type: Stage race
- Organiser: Amaury Sport Organisation
- Web site: www.thealulatour.com

History
- First edition: 1999; 27 years ago
- Editions: 10
- First winner: Amr Elnady (EGY)
- Most wins: Ghader Mizbani (IRN) (2 wins)
- Most recent: Jan Christen (SUI)

The AlUla Tour, formerly known as the Saudi Tour and the Tour of Saudi Arabia, is an annual professional road bicycle racing stage race first held in Saudi Arabia in 1999. It has been held intermittently since its creation, and in 2020 joined the UCI Asia Tour for the first time. It is promoted by the Amaury Sport Organisation (ASO) and were classified by the International Cycling Union (UCI) as a 2.1 category race from 2020 to 2025. From 2026, the race were upgraded to UCI ProSeries and were classified as 2.Pro.

== Winners ==
Year	Winner	Second	Third
1999	(Egypt) Amr Elnady	(Uzbekistan) Yuriy Plyukhin	(Slovakia) Ondrej Slobodník
2000	No race		
2001	(Iran) Ghader Mizbani	(Egypt) Mohamed Abdel Fattah	(Iran) Hossein Askari
2002	(Iran) Ghader Mizbani	(Kazakhstan) Sergey Lavrenenko	(Kazakhstan) Sergey Tretyakov
2003–2012	No race		
2013	(United Arab Emirates) Murad Tarik Obaid	(Saudi Arabia) Ali Abadi	(Saudi Arabia) Ayman Al Habtra
2014–2019	No race		
2020	(Germany) Phil Bauhaus	(France) Nacer Bouhanni	(Portugal) Rui Costa
2021	No race		
2022	(Belgium) Maxim Van Gils	(Colombia) Santiago Buitrago	(Portugal) Rui Costa
2023	(Portugal) Ruben Guerreiro	(Italy) Davide Formolo	(Colombia) Santiago Buitrago
2024	(United Kingdom) Simon Yates	(Belgium) William Junior Lecerf	(New Zealand) Finn Fisher-Black
2025	(United Kingdom) Tom Pidcock	(Norway) Fredrik Dversnes	(Norway) Johannes Kulset
2026	(Switzerland) Jan Christen	(Colombia) Sergio Higuita	(Spain) Igor Arrieta
