= Urs Glutz von Blotzheim =

Swiss military officer and politician (1751–1816)

Urs Glutz von Blotzheim (20 October 1751, Büsserach – 8 December 1816) was a Swiss military officer and politician.

Urs Glutz von Blotzheim was the son of the military officer Jacob Joseph Nicholas from the patrician class of the city of Solothurn, belonging to the noble family of Glutz von Blotzheim, and Anna Margaritha Josepha, born Wallier von Wendelstorf. From 1762 to 1769 he went to the Jesuit college in Solothurn, the predecessor of today's Kantonsschule Solothurn. In 1770 he was commissioned into the Swiss regiment Sury of the Kingdom of Sardinia. He was a member of St. Ursensift, an organization of Catholic laity.

In 1798 he was a member of the provisional government of Solothurn. He then was a member of Solothurn's Education Council from 1800 to 1801, a member of the Administrative Chamber from 1801 to 1803, and a provisional Senator from 1801 to 1802, serving on the Kleinrat and as Head of the Department of the Interior. From 1896 to 1815 he was the treasurer (Seckelmeister) of the town of Solothurn. In 1814 he became a member of the Altrat and from 1814 to 1816 served as treasurer for the provisional government.

1783 he married Magdalena von Sury, daughter of Altrat member Robert Georg. His sons were the writer and journalist Robert Glutz von Blotzheim and the priest Konrad Josef Glutz von Blotzheim.
