= Werner Ingold =

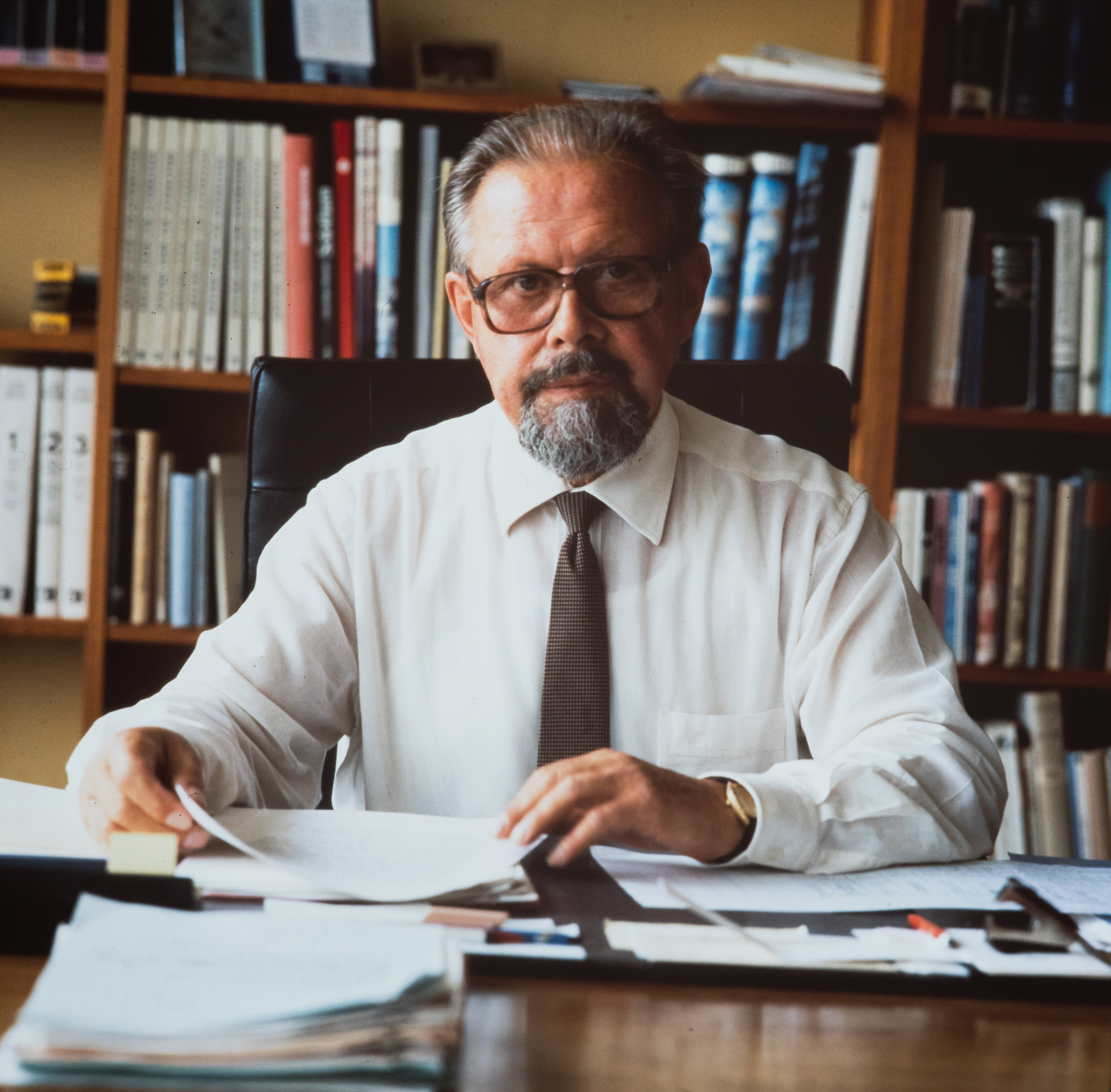
Portrait of Werner Ingold

Werner Ingold (20 February 1919 – 24 June 1995) was a Swiss chemist and entrepreneur. He was a pioneer in the field of chemical microanalysis, in particular in the development of glass-based, highly resistive pH electrodes. In 1948, he founded the Dr. W. Ingold AG, producing and selling sensors for process analytical applications. He developed the company to a mid-size international business organization and sold it in 1986 to Ciba Geigy. In 1966, Werner Ingold became an Active Life Member of The New York Academy of Sciences.

== Early life and education ==
Werner Ingold was born on 20 February 1919 in Lüterkofen, in the rural area of Solothurn, Switzerland. He was the youngest of three sons of Hans and Ida Ingold (née Santschi) to grow up on his father's farm. Werner attended primary and district school in the neighboring village of Hessigkofen and grammar school at Kantonsschule Solothurn.

== Academic career ==
Between 1938 and 1942, Werner Ingold studied chemistry at the Swiss Federal Institute of Technology (ETH) in Zurich and obtained his diploma as a chemical engineer under Hans Eduard Fierz with his thesis "On the Constitution of Naphtaline-Yellow". He then earned his doctorate at the Institute of Organic Technology under Leopold Ružička in the field of organic microanalysis of triterpene chemistry, completing his PhD in 1945 with the thesis "On Understanding Oleanolacid, Glycyrrhetinacid and Boswellinacid". After his dissertation, he remained at the Institute of Organic Technology at ETH, supported by a scholarship from the Foundation for the Promotion of Young Academics, and continued his research in the field of organic microanalysis.

During his post-graduate studies, Werner Ingold applied glass electrodes for the titration of organic compounds. Glass electrodes were already known to be suitable for measuring acidity (pH) at that time. (Elaborating on scientific groundwork by Max Cremer (1906), Fritz Haber and Zygmunt Klemensievicz (1909), Dungan Macinnes and Malcom Dole had developed pH-sensitive glass electrodes at the Rockefeller Institute for Medical Research in New York.) However, the tips of these electrodes were very brittle. The inventors estimated the wall thickness of the membrane to be less than 0.001 mm. Furthermore, these electrodes were largely unavailable in Europe during World War II and therefore had to be manufactured in chemical laboratories. During this time, Werner Ingold acquired a profound knowledge on glass and its manufacturing that allowed him to produce more robust pH electrodes that were suitable for laboratory and industrial applications. Werner Ingold was personally dedicated to the development and improvement of glasses for pH measurement until the sale of his company.

== Company foundation and development ==
In 1948, Werner Ingold started to produce glass electrodes for pH measurement, initially as a one-man company operating out of Huttenstrasse 24 in Zurich. Before he devoted himself entirely to the commercialization of pH electrodes, he was contacted by the Imperial Chemical Industries (ICI) Plastics Division to establish a micro-analytical laboratory in Welwyn Garden City, Hertfordshire, UK.

From 1950 onwards, Ingold advanced the manufacturing scale-up of pH sensors in Zurich. In 1952, the first employees joined the company and in the same year he founded Dr. W. Ingold GmbH in Frankfurt, Germany (converted into Dr. W. Ingold KG in 1960). In 1954, he converted the Zurich sole proprietorship into a stock corporation, Dr. W. Ingold AG.

In the early 1950s, the invention of the single-rod measuring cell, a combination of measurement and reference electrode in one construction unit, marked a decisive step towards becoming one of the world's leading companies in the field of pH measurement. Ingold recognized early on the demand for high quality and robust pH electrodes in the biotech industry – e.g. for the production of penicillin, where all sensors and fittings have to be sterilized at high temperatures and pressures. Therefore, in further development of pH electrodes, much emphasis was given on robustness and responsiveness of the sensors in harsh environments. Subsequently, the brands Argenthal (for high temperature, high pressure applications), EQUITHAL (compensates for temperature differences) and Xerolyt (without pressure compensation) were launched. Robust pH electrodes were also used in the chemical industry, and micro, puncture and surface electrodes were developed and commercialized for food applications.

By 1955, the company developed fittings for the introduction of sensors into tank and piping systems, enabling in-line use of sensors for industrial applications. In the 1970s and 1980s, sensors for the measurement of liquefied oxygen and carbon dioxide, as well as ion-selective electrodes (such as, for ammonium and nitrate) were developed on the basis of the glass electrode technology. To complete the product range, measurement electronics produced by third-party suppliers were also sold.

The production site in Zurich moved several times (in 1956 from Huttenstrasse 24 to Pfluggasse 6 and in 1961 to Scheuchzerstrasse 71). Finally, in 1974, the company built and moved into its own production site in Urdorf near Zurich. In 1966, together with Thomas A. Rosse of Instrumentation Laboratory Inc., Werner Ingold founded the joint-venture Ingold Electrode Inc. in Andover, Massachusetts (USA), for the production and distribution of sensors in North America. In 1970, the Ingold Technique sales and service branch was opened in Paris, and in 1978, the Ingold Industria e Commercio Ltda. production facility in São Paulo, Brazil.

Werner Ingold, as Head of Technology, Chairman of the Board of Directors and the Executive Board, was responsible for product innovation and developing the group's expanding portfolio, Dr. René Baumann, as Head of Sales, Member of the Board of Directors and Member of the Executive Board, was in charge of commercial development and the build-up of the sales network. The Board of Directors was completed by Dr. Hans Huessy. By the mid-1980s, the group of companies employed approximately 200 professionals and supplied customers in 44 countries.

In 1986, Ingold sold the company to Mettler Instruments AG, who at that time was owned by Ciba Geigy. As of 2019, PO Ingold is a still a business unit of Mettler-Toledo International.

== Personal life and death ==
Werner Ingold married Irene Ingold (née Martin) in 1962 and had three children. The family moved from Zurich to Uitikon-Waldegg in 1969. After selling Ingold AG, Werner Ingold acquired the hotel Haus Paradies in Ftan in the Lower Engadine, Switzerland. He planned and funded the modernization and refurbishment of the resort. Ingold died on 24 June 1995 in Uitikon-Waldegg
