= Amr Elnady =

Egyptian cyclist

Personal information
- Born: 4 June 1975 (age 51)

Cycling career
- Sport: Cycling
- Current team: Retired
- Discipline: Road
- Role: Rider

Amr Elnady (born 4 June 1975) is an Egyptian former professional road cyclist. He most notably won the Tour d'Egypte in 1999 and 2001 and the Tour of Saudi Arabia in 1999. He competed in the Men's Individual time trial at the 2000 Summer Olympics in Sydney where he finished 36th.

== Major results ==
1996
1st Overall Tour de Tunisie
1999
National Road Championships

1st Road race
1st Time trial

1st Overall Tour of Saudi Arabia

1st Prologue

1st Overall Tour d'Egypte

1st Prologue & Stages 1 & 8

1st Stage 7 Tour du Faso
2000
National Road Championships

1st Road race
1st Time trial

4th Overall Tour of Yugoslavia
9th Overall Okolo Slovenska
2001
1st Overall Tour d'Egypte

1st Stage 6

8th Road race, African Road Championships
