= AV Fryburgia =

Fraternity at the University of Fribourg, Switzerland

Coordinates: 46°48′19″N 7°9′29″E

- FR!
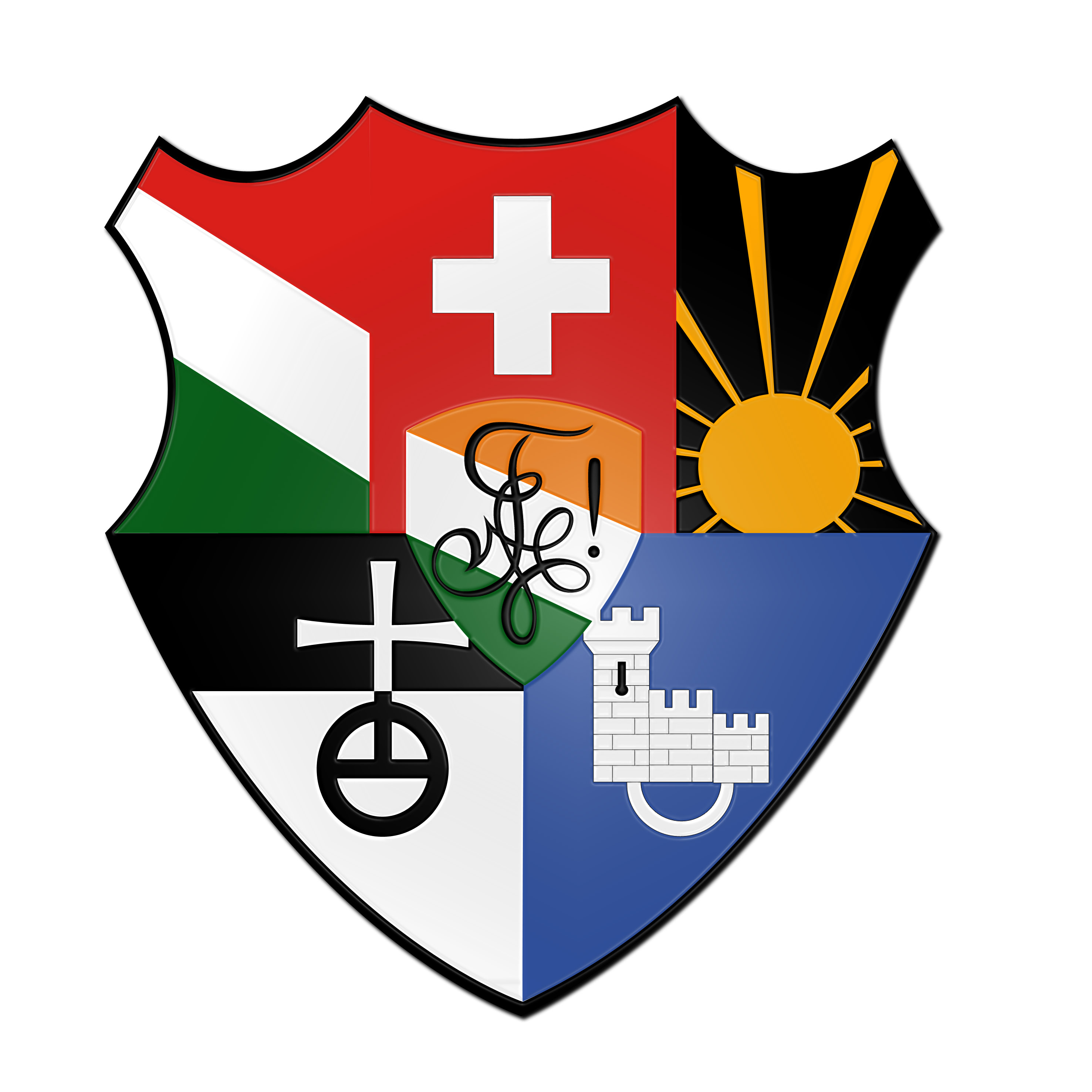
- Founded: 1918; 107 years ago University of Fribourg
- Type: Studentenverbindung
- Affiliation: Schweizerischer Studentenverein
- Status: Active
- Emphasis: Christianity
- Scope: Local
- Motto: Treu, ehrlich und stolz! "T.e.u.s.!; Loyal, honest and proud!"
- Colors: Red, White, and Green
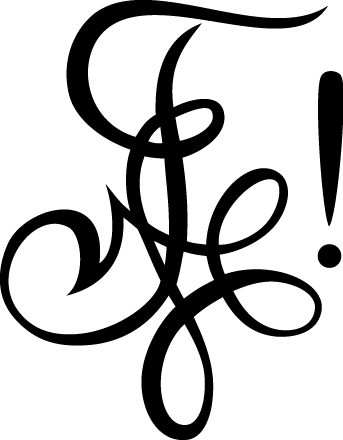
- Zirkel

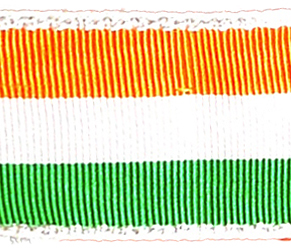
- Flag
- Chapters: 1
- Members: 25 active 300 lifetime
- Headquarters: Rue de Lausanne 52; Fribourg 1700; Switzerland
- Website: www.fryburgia.ch

AV (Akademische Verbindung; academic society) Fryburgia is a fraternity or Studentenverbindung at the University of Fribourg in Switzerland. Male students of all faculties are eligible to become members. The fraternity is a section of the Schweizerischer Studentenverein (Swiss Student's Society; SSS).

== History ==
In the early years of the 20th century, fraternity life in Europe became more and more time-consuming. Fraternity students had to be present at a large number of festivities such as balls, kneipen, and kommerse. This cost time and money which the students would have needed for their studies – idle semesters with no actual study success were common. The very strict rules and the obligation to consume alcohol in these fraternities made it even more difficult to follow a meaningful daily routine at university and the reputation of the students was very bad. Because of these reasons, some of the members of the AKV Alemannia – another still existing fraternity in Fribourg – decided in 1918 to separate and found a new fraternity, the AV Fryburgia. The AV Fryburgia was therewith the second “reform” fraternity in Switzerland, following AV Berchtoldia (in Bern) and followed by AV Welfen (in Zurich) and AV Froburger (in Basel). The goals of these fraternities were to concentrate more on science, religion, and social responsibility. Some old fraternity traditions that were seen as superfluous were abandoned, while others were maintained. The infamous “trinkzwang” – forced drinking – was abandoned.

The importance of the fraternity grew and until the 1970s it was one of the big and dominant fraternities in Fribourg and the Swiss Student Society. It only suffered – as did all other fraternities in Switzerland – during World War II when large numbers of students were drafted for military service. Around the war years, some members separated from AV Fryburgia to form new fraternities, the AV Staufer in 1937 and the CA Rezia in 1957. Unlike the separation from the AKV Alemannia, these fraternities separated on good terms.

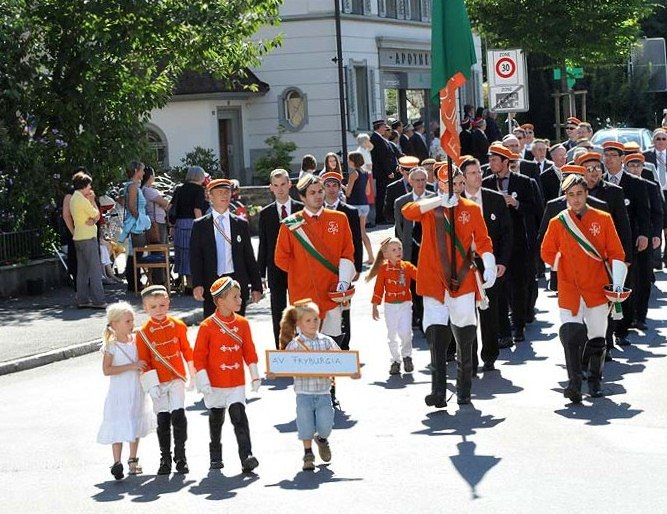
AV Fryburgia

During 1980, the AV Fryburgia became the first and only fraternity in Switzerland to have two members of the Swiss Federal Council at the same time, Kurt Furgler and Hans Hürlimann.

Today the fraternity still occasionally opposes the conservative mainstream inside the SSS. In autumn 2010 it declined a communiqué of the Council of the SSS in which the latter objected to the so-called scholarship initiative of the VSS-UNES-USU and is now a partnership organization of the initiative, which is demanding a popular vote in Switzerland on the scholarship policy of Switzerland.

== Basic principles ==
=== Basic principles ===
AV Fryburgia is part of the so-called “reform”. Although it does have certain drinking traditions, there is no mandatory drinking. The activities of the fraternity shall be limited to a reasonable amount. The center of fraternity life is the weekly Stammtisch (“regular’s table”) which is a mandatory event for the members. Quick and successful accomplishment of the studies is promoted, as well as sports.

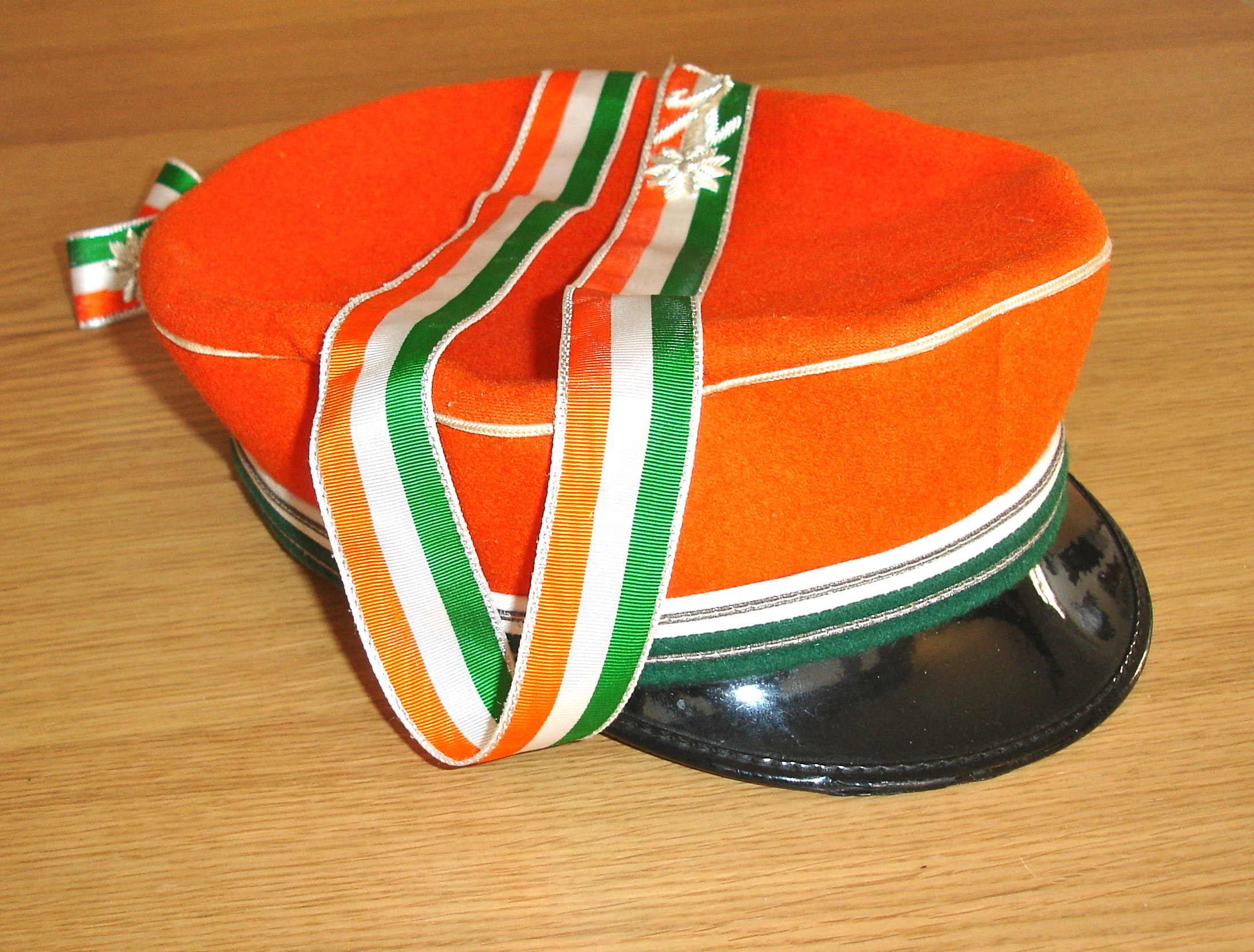
The fraternity's insignia

The fraternity bears colors and rejects the tradition of student fencing as being inconsistent with Christian ideas as well as pomposity such as the use of horses on parades (i.e. the Corpus Christi procession).

== Symbols ==
=== Motto ===
The Motto of the fraternity is Treu, ehrlich und stolz! or "T.e.u.s.!; „Loyal, honest and proud!“. It declares the values that should guide the members.

=== Coat of arms ===
The coat of arms of the fraternity is divided into six parts. Behind the colors and the monogram it displays in the upper half the colors of the SSS (red-white-green), the Swiss cross, and the rising sun (last sentence of the fraternities anthem: “Sonne, Sonne, ringe Dich durch!” – lit. “The sun shall prevail”). In the lower half, it shows the ancient seal of the University of Fribourg and the coat of arms of the City of Fribourg.

=== Anthem ===
The fraternity's anthem was written by famous Swiss composer Abbé Joseph Bovet who also composed "Our chalet", a song of the French Resistance. It is one of the very few student anthems with an own melody.

De clair soleil, la tête auréolée
au fond du coeur la flamme du devoir
chantons leurs airs, en joyeuse envolée
dans ses murs gris, Fribourg aime a les voir:
Fryburgia, Fryburgia, c'est toi, c'est ta cohorte
preux troubadours, servants de l'idéal
dont la devise, impérative et forte
s'en va quérir l'astre à l'éclat royal!
Sonne, Sonne, ringe Dich durch!
Sonne, Sonne, ringe Dich durch!

== Notable members (selection) ==
- Daniel Anrig, President of the Supreme Court of the Canton of Glarus
- Kurt Furgler (*1924, †2008), former Member of the Swiss Federal Council and President of the Swiss Confederation (CVP)
- Hans Hürlimann (*1918, †1994), former Member of the Swiss Federal Council and President of the Swiss Confederation (CVP)
- Martin Pfister (*1963), member of the Federal Council, head of the Federal Department of Defence, Civil Protection and Sport (Centre)
- Johannes Baptist Rösler (*1922, †2009), German politician and former member of the German Bundestag (CDU)
- Hans Wiprächtiger (*1943), former member (until 2011) of the Supreme Court of Switzerland (SP)
