= Urs Dietschi =

Swiss lawyer and politician

UIrs Dietschi
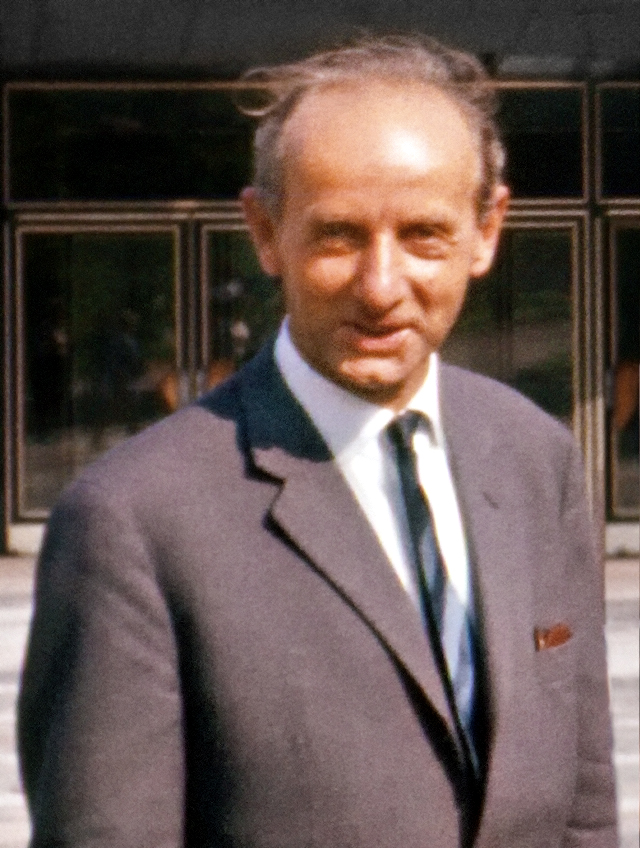
- 1963
- Born: 18 November 1901; Olten (SO), Switzerland
- Died: 29 July 1982 (aged 80); Solothurn, Switzerland
- Occupations: Lawyer; Government official Member of cantonal parliament (1933–1937); Member of cantonal executive (1937–1966); Member of national parliament (1943–1959)
- Political party: FDP
- Spouse: Emmy Schmid
- Father: Dr. Hugo Dietschi (1864–1955)

Urs Dietschi (18 November 1901 – 29 July 1982) was a Swiss lawyer who entered government service. He then became increasingly caught up in politics and in 1929 became a co-founder of an organisation called the "Jungliberale Bewegung" ("Young liberal movement"). At the urging of like-minded liberal-radical activists, he secured election to the Solothurn cantonal parliament in 1933, remaining a member till 1937. In 1943 he secured election to the "Nationalrat" (lower house of the Swiss national parliament in Bern), representing the Free Democratic Party on behalf of his canton. Meanwhile, he remained a leading figure in cantonal governance, serving as a member of the Solothurn cantonal executive between 1937 and 1966. At both National and cantonal levels he took a consistent interest in social policy and cultural affairs, and was also prominent as an advocate of enhanced social, economic and political rights for women, at a time when Switzerland was, by European standards, widely seen as something of a laggard in such matters.

== Life and career ==
=== Provenance and early years ===
Urs Dietschi was born into a well-established family in Olten (SO), a prosperous mid-sized town with a mixed economy on the western fringes of Middle Switzerland, in which he grew up. The lawyer-politician Dr. Hugo Dietschi (1864–1955) was his father. His grandfather, Prof. Peter Dietschi (1830–1907) - another politician), had founded the regional newspaper Oltner Tagblatt back in 1869. There was a family tradition of careful scholarship, humanitarian values and an open-mindedness when it came to cultural and social values which provided context for Dietschi's upbringing. He commenced his schooling in Olten and then moved on to the "Kantonsschule" (secondary school) in Solothurn, twenty minutes to the west by train, and an institution which over the years produced a number of notable politicians from Solothurn. On leaving school he enrolled successively at the universities of Heidelberg, Berlin and Bern to study Jurisprudence. He was still only 24 when he received his doctorate from the University of Bern. His doctoral dissertation concerned "The People's Veto in Switzerland". It was, in the view of one admiring commentator, a particularly appropriate topic for a young man from Olten, firmly grounded in the liberal 1830s traditions and beliefs. A core belief in the rights of the Swiss people and the central importance of the referendum in politics would shape his entire political life.

After 1925 he was able to travel extensively, spending time in Paris and London. These were years of intensifying political polarisation across Europe, which was intensified by the Great Depression's economic hardship and surging unemployment that followed the Wall Street crash. The effects were felt in London, Paris and, especially, in Berlin, while south of Ticino, Italy had switched to what became an anti-democratic fascist political system as early as 1922. Dietschi was never drawn to the illusory simplistic "solutions" of the demagogues and populists..

Dietschi embarked on his professional career in 1928, working as a layer-notary in Solothurn. Later that same year he accepted a cantonal-level government position as a "legal secretary" to the Department for the military, police, justice and public instruction. Although he worked in the department for little more than a year, his political education was greatly developed. His departmental boss was the distinguished liberal jurist-politician Dr. Robert Schöpfer, from whom he learned the discipline and systematic approach necessary for effective administration work. His political liberalism was hardened. Schöpfer became a longstanding mentor, and a valuable counterweight to the sometimes headstrong approach that Dietschi and other younger liberal activists would sometimes adopt in reaction to the political extremism overflowing onto the streets of Germany, Italy and Austria, and by which politics in Switzerland could not remain untouched. In 1929 Dietschi's professional focus switched again: between 1929 and 1937 he is described as a lawyer based in Olten, although by this time his energies were increasingly taken up by his political career.

=== Young Liberals movement ===
During 1929 Dietschi was a co-founder of the so-called "Jungliberale Bewegung des Kanton Solothurn und der Schweiz" ("Young liberal movement..."), a loosely organised grouping that sought to renew liberalism "in the spirit of the freedom-loving nineteenth century". Between 1941 and 1945 Dietschi would serve as the national president of the "movement". He teamed up with a number of like-minded gifted young men from other cantons including, most notably, Emil Lohner, Alfred Schaller and Hans Huber to call for a political reconfiguration. In place of the "timeless" class-struggle which had become central to political though during the nineteenth century the "Young Liberals" called for a coming together of the three historically separated classes: the bourgeoisie, the [urban] workers and the peasantry. The social renewal to which the young radicals aspired had to involve a fair balance of interests. The coming together needed to embrace not merely a focus on the shared interests of the traditionally separated social classes, but also a coming together of those separated by language, culture and jealously guarded cantonal distinctions. In 1933 the movement pursued the logic of their ideas further, with demands that the changes they espoused needed to be enshrined and secured through a total revision of the Swiss constitution. Much of the significance of the "Jungliberale Bewegung" comes not from their short-term victories. Swiss polities were in many ways frozen by the coming to power of Hitler in 1933 and the war among neighbouring nations that followed. But during the half century that followed 1945, much of the agenda of Switzerland's Young Liberals became mainstream and was adopted. In the nearer term, however, the "Jungliberale Bewegung" was confronted after 1934 by the emergence of the "Tatgemeinschaft", another loosely defined but shrilly promoted grouping, drawing support from Catholic conservative and corporatist elements as well as from moderniser nationalists inspired by Mussolini and Hitler. These, too, called for a total revision of the Swiss constitution, and the objectives of the two movements became for a time conflated in popular consciousness, despite their contrasting philosophical underpinnings. The young liberals rejected corporate and populist pressures. Instead they placed their emphasis on the power of organisation. There was much discussion of a "Wirtschaftsrat" (loosely, "Economic Assembly"), but it appears that in Switzerland of the 1930s that idea was more appealing to the corporatist right-wingers than to "liberals". To the frustration of the more hard headed among them - who evidently, in this respect, included Emmy Dietschi, Urs' wife: "Irritating to the economic liberals was the way in which the 'Young Liberals' were far more interested in social policy than in pro-business liberal economic strategies". (Note: "...Störend für den Wirtschaftsfreisinn war, dass die Jungliberalen nicht so absolut wirtschaftsfreundlich, viel stärker sozial eingestellt waren".) Among the leading Young Liberals there was very little experience of commerce and manufacturing. There were teachers and journalists. Dietschi himself came from a long line of scholarly politicians and himself had a background in the law and in public administration. Historian Walter Wolf sums up the situation during the 1930s with the provocative assertion that "the Young Liberals sometimes believed that liberalism had become outdated".

=== Parliamentarian ===
In 1933, with the backing of his Young Liberal comrades, Urs Dietschi was elected to the Solothurn cantonal parliament. The assembly had been dominated by traditionalist liberals (known in Solothurn at that time as the party of Free-thinking Democrats / "... freisinnige-Demokraten") till 1917, after which the party could no longer count on an absolute majority of seats at every election, thanks to the presence of growing numbers of socialist members. Its successor party nevertheless retained more seats than any other single party till at least 2021. Urs Dietschi was 32 when he was elected which was considered rather young.

In 1937 Dietschi was appointed to membership of the 5-member Solothurn cantonal executive, a position he retained till 1966. Only two members have served for longer. The role gave him important coordination and oversight responsibilities in respect of cantonal governance. The appointment came on the basis of a recommendation/nomination by an assembly of the party of Free-thinking Democrats, and followed the party-enforced retirement of his idiosyncratic party colleague Dr. Hans Kaufmann. Membership of the Solothurn Council of state did not preclude embarking on a parallel career in national politics.

In October 1943 Urs Dietschi was elected to the "Nationalrat" (lower house of the national parliament). Although the Social Democrats topped the poll nationally, in the Canton of Solothurn it was the Free Democratic Party (FDP - as the liberal party was known nationally) that polled the most votes. Dietschi was one of three FDP members (along with two Social Democrats and two Conservatives representing Solothurn in the Bern parliament. He now tried to put his ideals into practice, contextualising matters that divided, and concentrating on shared aspirations and priorities. Social, constitutional and cultural policy would be of particular interest to him, and the departmental responsibilities allocated to him provided plenty of opportunity for him to contribute constructively. There are also references to his having taken a keen interest in protection of the natural environment, both in a cantonal level and in the "Nationalrat". He served as a member of parliament between 6 December 1943 and 6 December 1959, holding true to the tenets of the Young Liberal movement throughout.

Although Switzerland was not among the belligerent nations during the war, the strategic, economic and political impact meant that there were very few government initiatives placed before the "Nationalrat" between 1939 and 1945 other than those necessitated by international developments. After 1945 Urs Dietschi's social and political views frequently placed him at odds with party comrades for whom political liberalism was primarily concerned with economics and commerce. Both at a cantonal level and nationally he was openly supportive of extending voting rights to women well before the issue rose to the top of the political agenda for many (male) Swiss liberals, though a few generations later his nuanced justification of his position comes across as quaint, at best: "I am at once both for and against [votes for women] ... Womankind would also be burdened [by the heavy responsibility of being able to vote], because they are such sensitive souls". (Note: "...… Ich bin dafür und dagegen zugleich … Der Frau würden auch Lasten auferlegt, unter denen sie als sensibles Wesen leiden könnte …") He was backing the inclusion of women on an extraparliamentary commission as early as September 1944. As longstanding president, between 1952 and 1971, of the "Federal Commission for the Protection of Nature and the Homeland", Dietschi also used his political positions and the public profile that went with them to campaign effectively and with impressive persistence in support of nature and heritage protection. He believed that the issues involved important responsibilities, that national legislators could not simply leave to cantonal authorities and private individuals. Born into the so-called Christian Catholic Church, which had emerged out of the deist currents of the Enlightenment, Dietschi was deeply committed to religious tolerance. One example of this was his engagement with the rehabilitation of the Benedictine Monastery at Mariastein which had been twice secularized, in 1792 and again in 1874, but was rededicated and formally re-established in 1971.

=== The record ===
Urs Dietschi died at Solothurn on 29 July 1982. He had accumulated many papers, and these were donated by his widow Emmy to the archives section of the Central Library Solothurn in Solothurn. During the first decade of the twenty-first century the papers were fully catalogued by the Solothurn historian-author Dr. Ruedi Graf-Vargas. The resulting archive constitutes a source and important research tool for the history of the canton during the twentieth century and on that of the "Young liberal movement". The archive fills more than 25 linear meters on the shelves of the library archived, and are complemented by recordings of eight detailed interviews that Graf-Vargas conducted with Emmy Schmidt, the widow of Urs Dietschi. The interviews focus primarily on the professional career of Urs Dietschi, but also provide extensive insights into Emmy Dietschi's own role as the wife of a politician and as a politically aware and socially engaged woman.
