= Kantonsschule Solothurn =

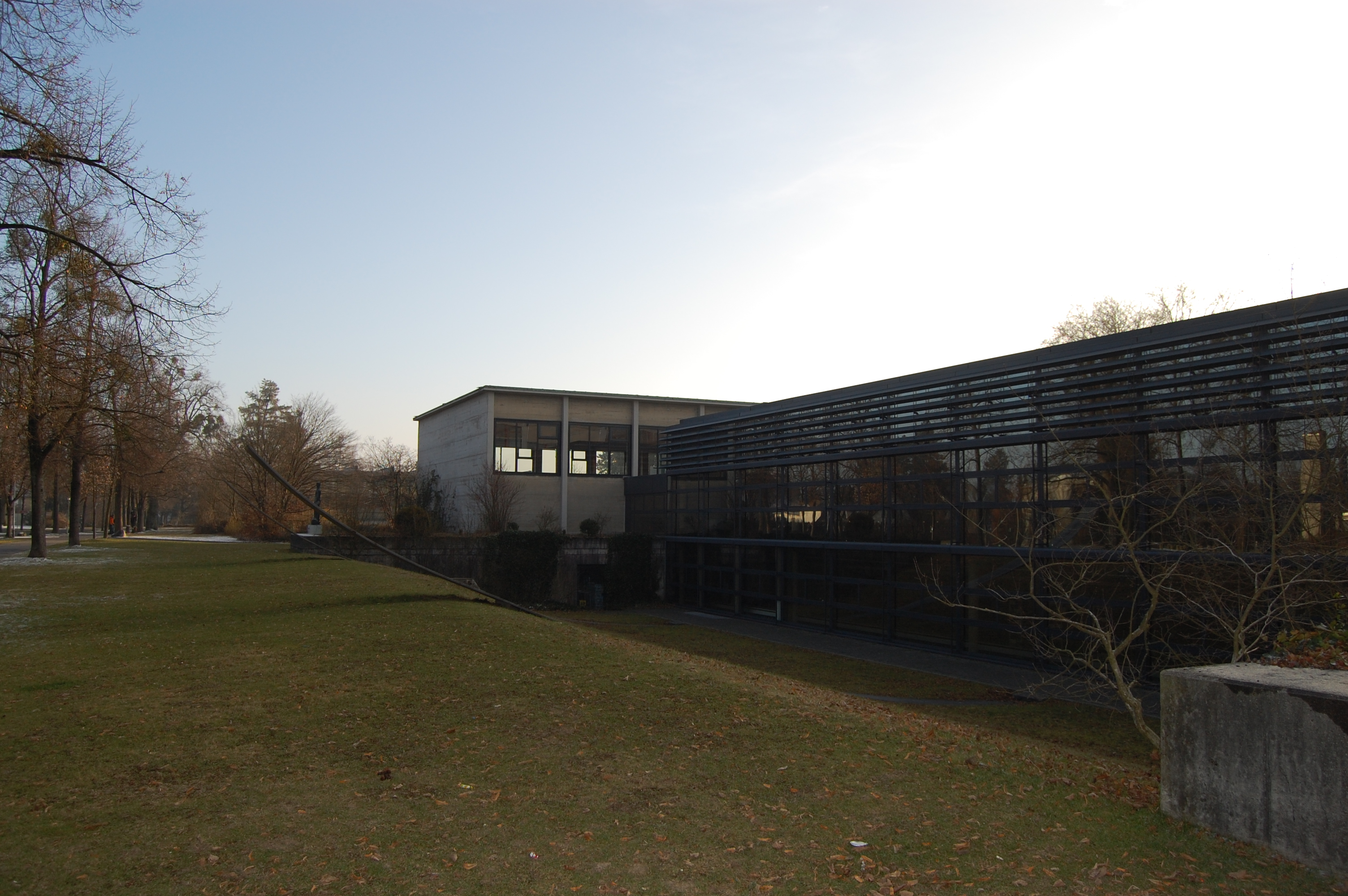

Location
- Herrenweg 18; Solothurn, Solothurn, 4502; Switzerland
- Coordinates: 47.2148°N 7.5369°E

Information
- Type: Gymnasium
- Principal: Stefan Zumbrunn-Würsch
- Enrolment: 1,800 (2007)
- Website: ksso.ch

The Kantonsschule Solothurn is a gymnasium in the municipality of Solothurn, Switzerland. With approximately 1,800 students (stand: 2007) it is among the biggest schools in Switzerland. Since August 1, 2024, Christina Tardo-Styner has served as principal, succeeding Stefan Zumbrunn-Würsch, who held the position from 2005 to 2024.

== Structure ==
The Kantonsschule of Solothurn is divided into:

- the Maturitätsschule, which offers a Scientific Profile, a Physical Education Profile, an Economic & Law Profile, an Art Profile and a Linguistic Profile. It is a four year school and students normally start at the age of 15.
- the Fachmittelschule (social, education and health), which takes three years to graduate. Normally, students start at the age of 16.
- the Sek P also called Untergymnasium (preparation for the Maturitätsschule), which is currently three years long and will drop to two years starting next school year 2011/12. Students start at the age of 11 or 12.

== Other ==
- Media library with 30,000 books, encyclopaedias, dictionaries, videos, DVDs, CDs, magazines, cassettes, paperbacks and novels
- Cafeteria, which is operated by the "nonprofit women's organization" on behalf of the Canton
- 60 free courses (very high amount for a Kantonsschule)

== Notable Professors ==
- Hermann Breitenbach
- Hans Rudolf Breitenbach
- Urs Joseph Flury
- Franz Joseph Hugi
- Franz Misteli
- Gaudenz Taverna

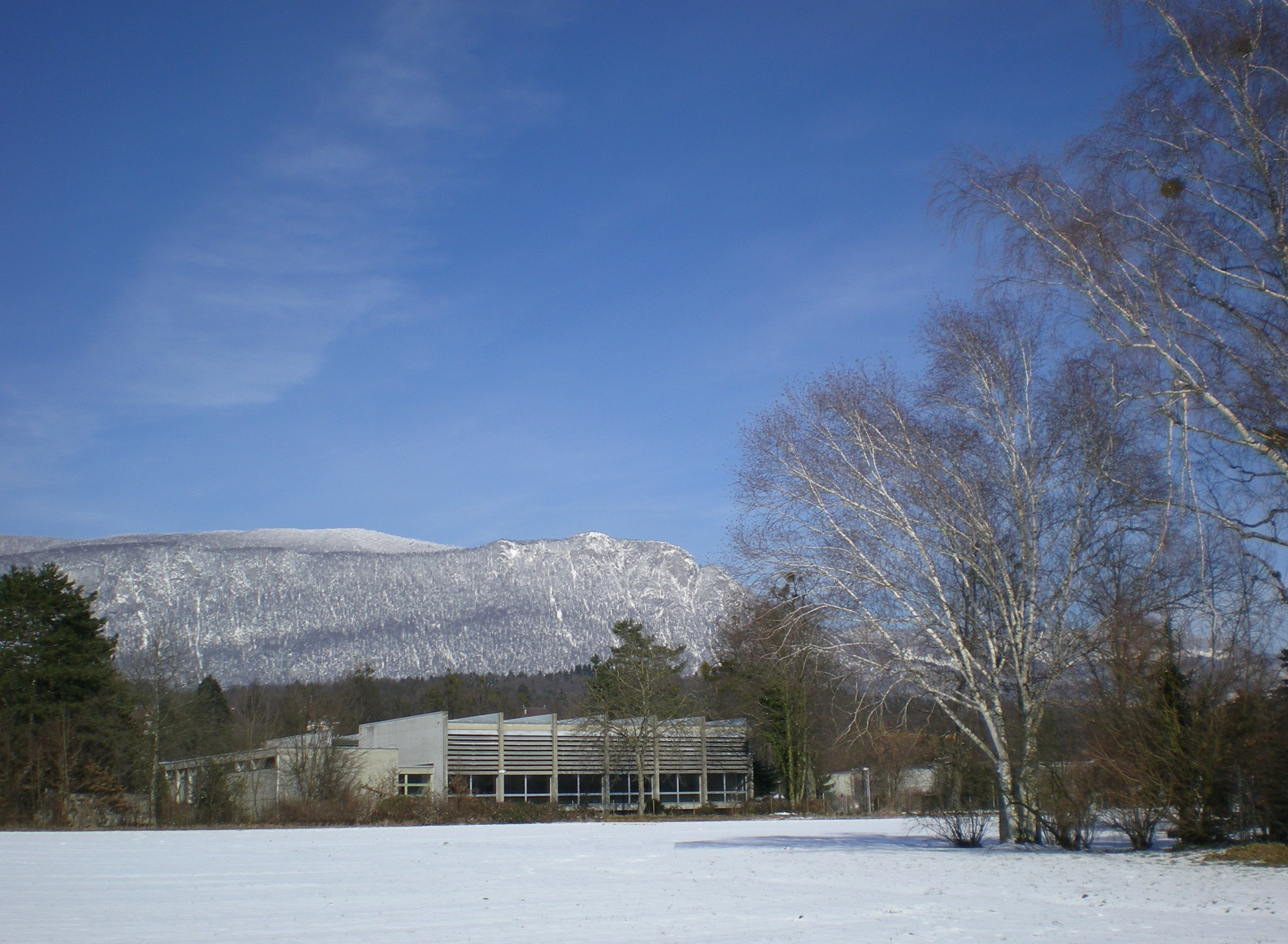
Kantonsschule Solothurn, February 2009

== Notable alumni ==
- Karl Arnold-Obrist (1796–1862), Roman Catholic Bishop in Diocese of Basel.
- Friedrich Fiala (1817–1888), historian and Roman Catholic bishop in the diocese of Basel
- Robert Glutz von Blotzheim (1786–1818), writer and journalist
- Urs Glutz von Blotzheim (1751–1816), officer and politician
- Werner Ingold (1919-1995), pioneer in the field of chemical microanalysis and entrepreneur in the commercialization of pH electrodes
- Benedikt Weibel (born 1946), former CEO of the Swiss Federal Railways
- Samuel Schmid (born 1947), former member of the Swiss Federal Council (2001–2008) and former President of the Swiss Confederation (2005)
- Carla Stampfli (born 1984), professional swimmer with several Swiss records and participation in the Olympic Games in Athens 2004
