= Franz Joseph Hugi =

Swiss geologist and teacher

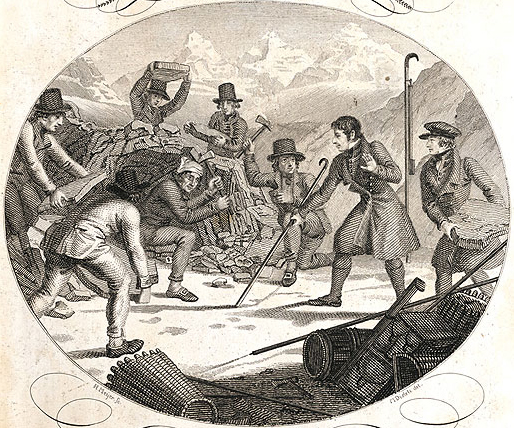
- Known for: "father of winter mountaineering"

Academic background
- Education: theology (1814–1818 natural science (1818)

Academic work
- Discipline: geology
- Main interests: glacier phenomena

Franz Joseph Hugi (1791–1855) was a Swiss geologist and teacher who was called the "father of winter mountaineering," and was author of two pioneer works on glacier phenomena.
