= A.V. Turicia =

Swiss student association

Coordinates: 47°23′07″N 8°32′19″E

- TU!
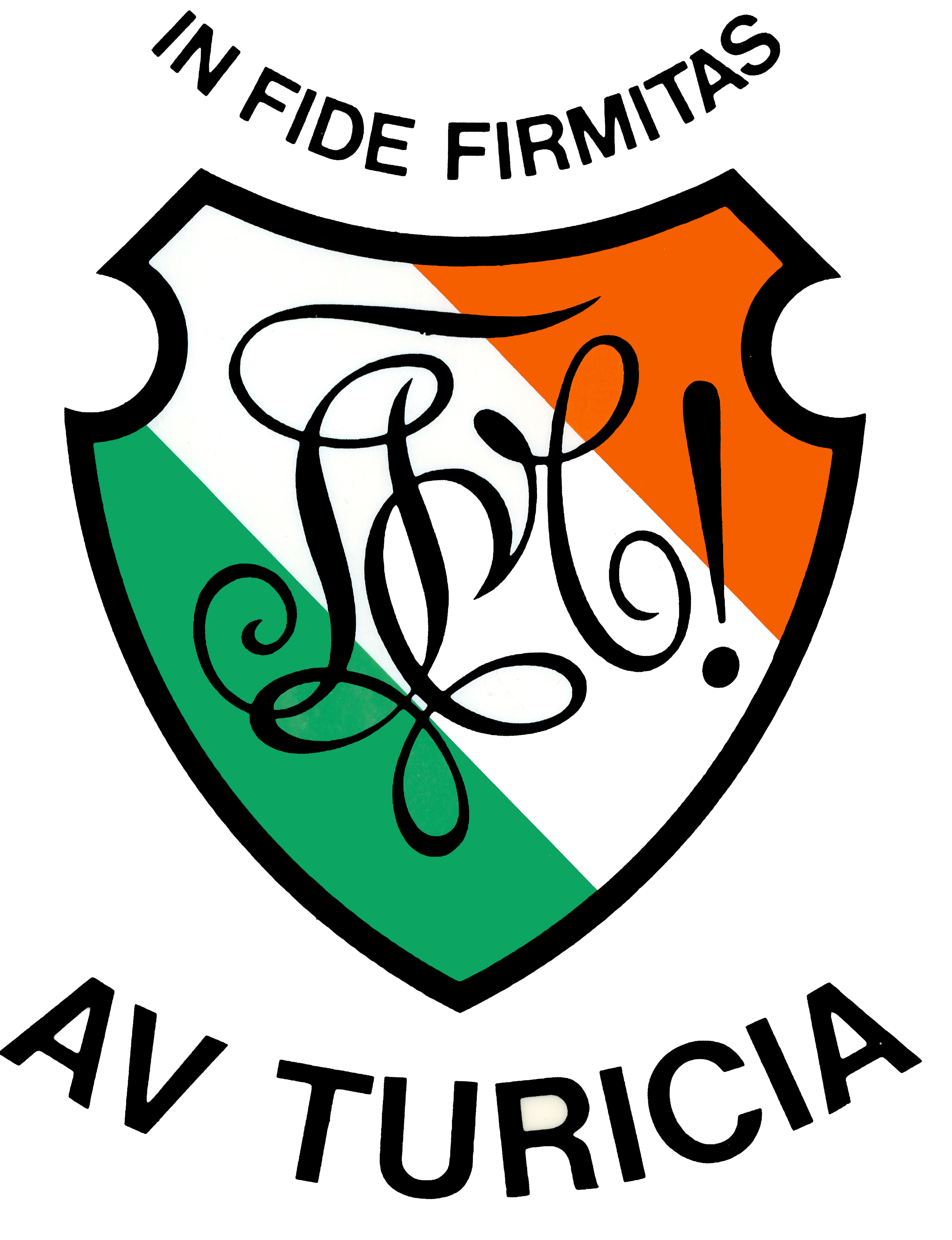
- Founded: 1860; 165 years ago University of Zurich
- Type: Studentenverbindung
- Affiliation: Swiss Student Association; Federation of Student Komment Societies
- Status: Active
- Emphasis: Catholic
- Scope: Local
- Motto: In fide firmitas! "In Fidelity is Strength"
- Colors: Orange, White and Green
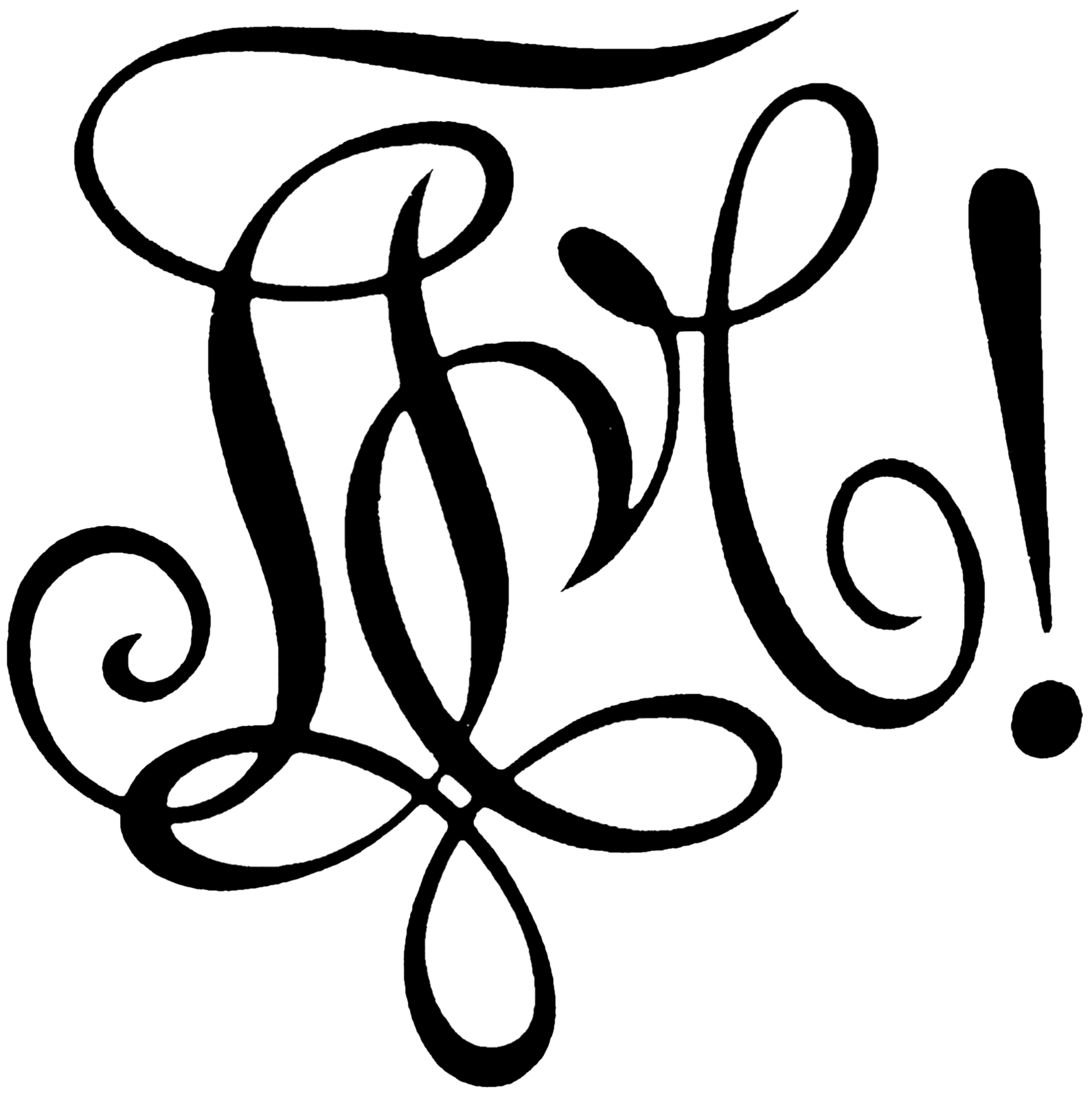
- Zirkel
- Chapters: 1
- Members: 290 active
- Headquarters: Nordstrasse 22; Zurich 8006; Switzerland
- Website: www.turicia.ch

AV Turicia is a color-bearing student society based in Zürich. Founded in 1860, it is affiliated with the Swiss Student Association and a member of the Federation of Student Komment Societies (also known as "Block"). AV Turicia holds the distinction of being the oldest university group within the Federation, which was established in 1841.

== Purpose ==
AV Turicia is a registered association under the Swiss Civil Code, headquartered in Zürich. The society fosters camaraderie among its members and is guided by Christian principles. Its mission includes shaping societal and political discourse by cultivating students' understanding of Swiss history and their responsibility toward the heritage of the Catholic Church.

== History ==
=== Founding ===
The founding of the Zurich section of the Swiss Student Association is documented in the November book of the Monat-Rosen. Established in 1860 by ETH student Anton Petrelli and four medical students—Franz Bridler, Paul Egger, Robert Lenz, and Ernst Müller—the group expanded in December 1860 with the addition of a standing semester that convened weekly. On 11 January 1861, during its first committee meeting (Komitee), the group elected medical student Fintan Bärlocher from Rheintal as its inaugural Senior (chair) and Präses (president).

A letter to the Lucerne section reveals challenges faced by these early members. As pioneers within the StV who attended non-Catholic universities, they increasingly engaged with institutions such as the Alma Mater Basiliensis, University of Zurich, and University of Bern. In Protestant-dominated Zürich, the section collaborated with Catholic groups like the *Gesellenverein* (journeymen’s association) and church choirs to advocate for the rights of the Catholic minority beyond fostering camaraderie.

=== Cultural struggles and growth ===
During the 1873 Kulturkampf, Catholics were expelled from the Church of Augustin and relocated to the newly built St. Peter and Paul Church in Aussersihl. The 1880s marked a turning point: in summer 1883, the section gained recognition as the "Catholic Student Organization Turicia," and by winter 1883–84, it joined the Allgemeine Studentenversammlung (General Student Assembly). On 8 December 1885, the association adopted its signature red-white-green sash and red hat.

In February 1886, Turicia celebrated its 25th anniversary. At the Sursee general assembly that year, the "Dreibund" alliance—comprising AKV Rauracia, AKV Burgundia, and AV Turicia—was formed to strengthen Catholic student networks within the Swiss Student Association.

=== Rise as a Catholic stronghold ===
Archival records detail Turicia's ascendancy as a hub for Zürich's Catholic elite by the turn of the 20th century. The society, where multiple Swiss languages were spoken, benefited from an active alumni network. Its leadership included ministers Karl Reichlin and Josef Burtscher, followed by physician Emil Pestalozzi-Pfyffer, who presided for two decades. Members like Georg Baumberger (founder of the Christian Social Party in Zürich), Ludwig Schneller, and Conrad Bürgi played key roles in shaping Switzerland’s socio-political landscape. Notable figures also included Adalbert Wirz and Josef Düring, instrumental in founding the Swiss Catholic People's Party, and national councillor Philipp Etter.

=== 20th century challenges and adaptations ===
In the early 1900s, Turicia's 60-member Activitas (active wing) debated establishing a fraternity house near the university. During a secret meeting, members adopted orange as their new color and the motto In fide firmitas ("Strength in Faith") at their second flag dedication. The society marked its 50th anniversary in May 1911.

By 1935, Turicia celebrated its 75th anniversary amid rising national tensions preceding World War II. In 1942, it co-founded the "Block" alliance of Kommentverbindungen (traditional student societies) to uphold Swiss autonomy. Postwar, Turicia fostered ties with German and Austrian student groups like K. D. St. V. Alpina Innsbruck and K. D. St. V. Hohentwiel Stuttgart, later maintaining links with K. D. St. V. Winfridia Münster and K. D. St. V. Trifels Munich.

A 1951 dispute over the election of a non-Block president led Turicia to withdraw from the Kommentverbindungen network. This independence preceded its centenary preparations in 1960, including the purchase of a fraternity house. Despite internal debates over abolishing mandatory insignia (Farbenobligatorium) in 1968, Turicia retained its traditions while engaging in socio-political discourse.

=== Modern era ===
After losing its meeting hall (Stammlokal Feldschlösschen), Turicia revitalized through historical reflection and community-building initiatives. Renovating its Nordstrasse 22 headquarters and adopting the Stammlokal Urania as a new hub, the society reaffirmed its role within the Swiss Student Association, contributing multiple central committee members in subsequent decades.

== Symbols ==
AV Turicia's motto is In fide firmitas! (Latin for "In fidelity is strength"). Its colors are orange, white, and green.

== Related organizations ==
On 24 February 1912, AV Turicia established the sister society Kyburger, distinguished by its pink-white-green colors. Following precedents set with earlier organizations like Turania, GV Gallensis, Corvina, and GV Desertinia, Turicia served as patron during Kyburger's inaugural flag dedication in summer 1912. Though their relationship experienced periodic tensions, joint alumni initiatives sought to mediate these disputes until 1944. Turicia and Kyburger continue to collaborate on shared interests.
