= Zofingia =

Swiss student society

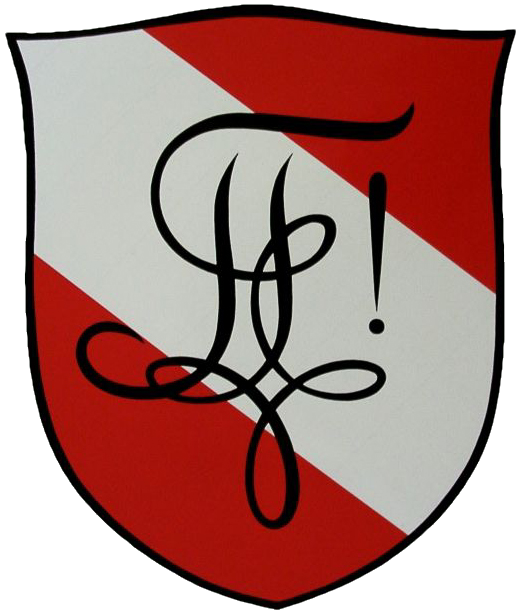
- Founded: 1819; Zofingen, Switzerland
- Type: Association of student societies
- Status: Active
- Scope: National
- Motto: Patriae – Amicitiae – Litteris
- Colors: Red, White and Red
- Zirkel
- Chapters: 13 (2010)
- Members: ~400 (2010) active ~ 2,300 (2010) lifetime
- Website: zofingia.ch

The Schweizerischer Zofingerverein, Latinized as Zofingia (French: Société suisse de Zofingue), is an association of 13 Swiss student societies. In 2010 it had nine sections at Swiss universities and four at secondary schools (Mittelschulen), with about 400 active members and 2,300 alumni (Altzofinger). It was founded in Zofingen in 1819 by students from Zurich and Bern. They took their inspiration from the Wartburg Festival of 1817 and from the founding of the German Burschenschaft, but at first rejected German student customs, which were adopted only in the 1830s.

== History ==
After Zurich and Bern, sections were founded in Lucerne and Lausanne in 1820, in Basel in 1821, in Geneva and Neuchâtel in 1823, in St. Gallen in 1824, in Fribourg in 1829 and in Aarau in 1834. From 1916 to 1970 there was a section in Bellinzona. The alumni are united in the Schweizerischer Altzofingerverein, founded in 1861, which has 17 sections. All members wear the white cap and the red-white-red ribbon. Since 1819 the association has met every year for its central festival (Centralfest) in its "federal town" (Bundesstadt) of Zofingen. In keeping with its motto Patriae – Amicitiae – Litteris, it aimed to unite the students of Switzerland in a single association, and it was also part of the national movement for the creation of a liberal federal state. Many of its members played an important part in Swiss politics from the Regeneration onward. In the Federal Assembly of 1848, 19 members were Zofingians (Zofinger); by 1860 their number had risen to 27.

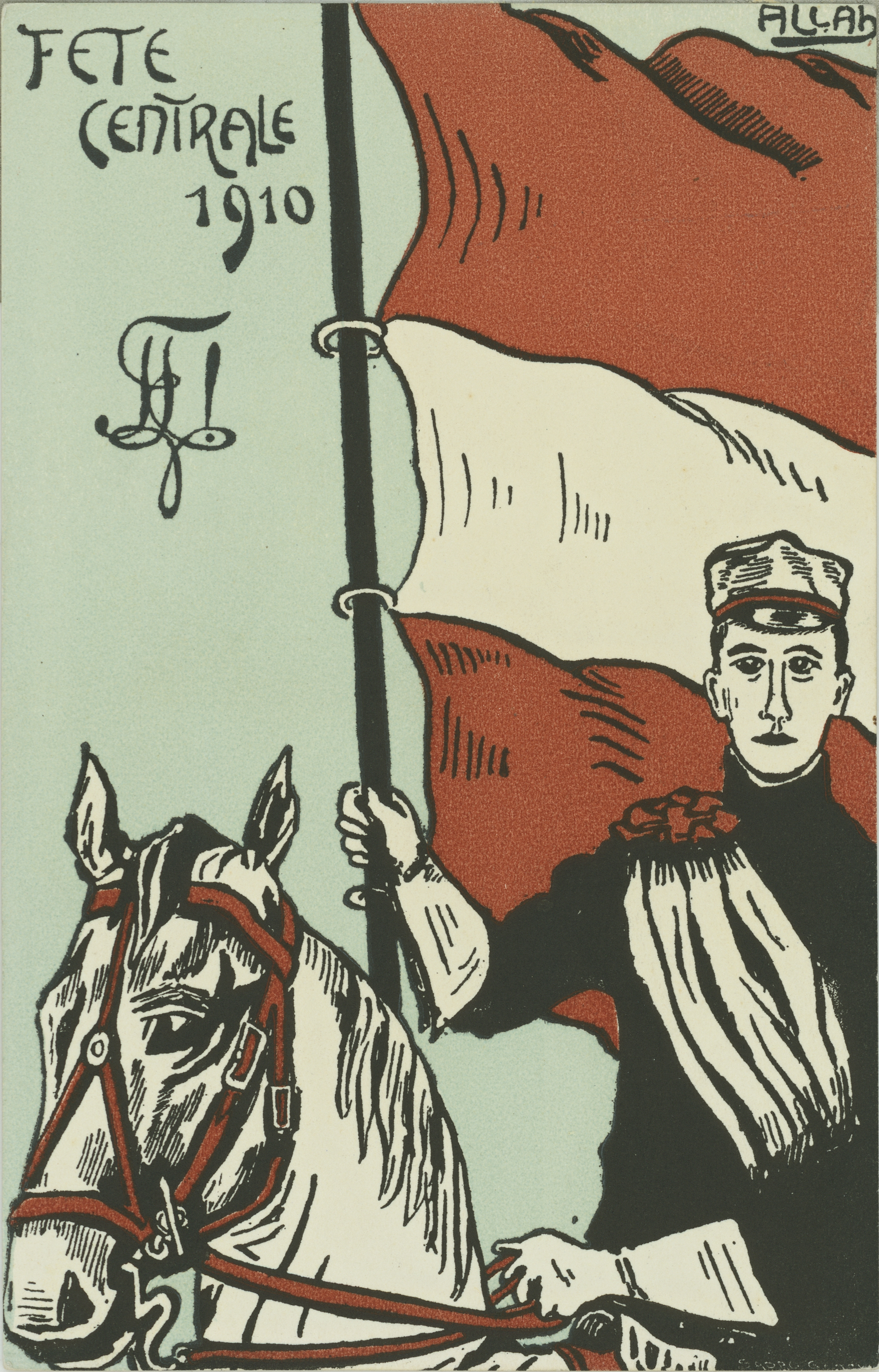
Postcard of the central festival of 1910

After the Basel and Neuchâtel sections had sided with the conservatives during the Regeneration, the Zofingians of Lucerne and Zurich broke away and in 1832 founded the radical student society Helvetia. In 1847 came the "great schism": a narrow conservative majority stayed in the Schweizerischer Zofingerverein, while the liberal radicals joined in the Neu-Zofingerverein (New Zofingia Society), which they renamed Helvetia in 1849. In 1865 and 1903 the association banned the duel and with it the Mensur, which led to the breakaway of Neuzofingia Zürich.

From about 1900 the association also took up the social question. A socialist and pacifist wing, the Idealzofinger, took shape and came into conflict with the liberal-conservative Ubetonen wing, whose name came from the abbreviation UBT for am untern Burschentisch ("at the lower students' table"), where its members used to sit. Only in the face of the threat from National Socialism, which the association in the end firmly rejected, did it agree on a patriotic and liberal basic stance. The two tendencies have nevertheless shaped the life of the association up to the present. Among Swiss student societies it is regarded as liberal and open. The nationality principle (Nationalitätsprinzip) was dropped in 1974; the principle of a men-only association remains. From 1968 onward the association largely lost its political and social importance.

== See also ==
- List of Swiss student societies

== Bibliography ==
- Centralblatt des Schweizerischen Zofingervereins, 1861–
- Der Schweizerische Zofingerverein 1819–1969, 1969
- P. Ehinger, Die alte Schale nur ist fern, 1994
- J.-M. Spothelfer, Les Zofingiens, 1995
- K. Haegi, Neuzofingia Zürich, 2002
