= 2018 national road cycling championships =

The 2018 national road cycling championships was held throughout the year and are organised by the UCI member federations. They began in Australia and New Zealand with the time trial event (both men and women) on 5 January, as is tradition.

== Jerseys ==
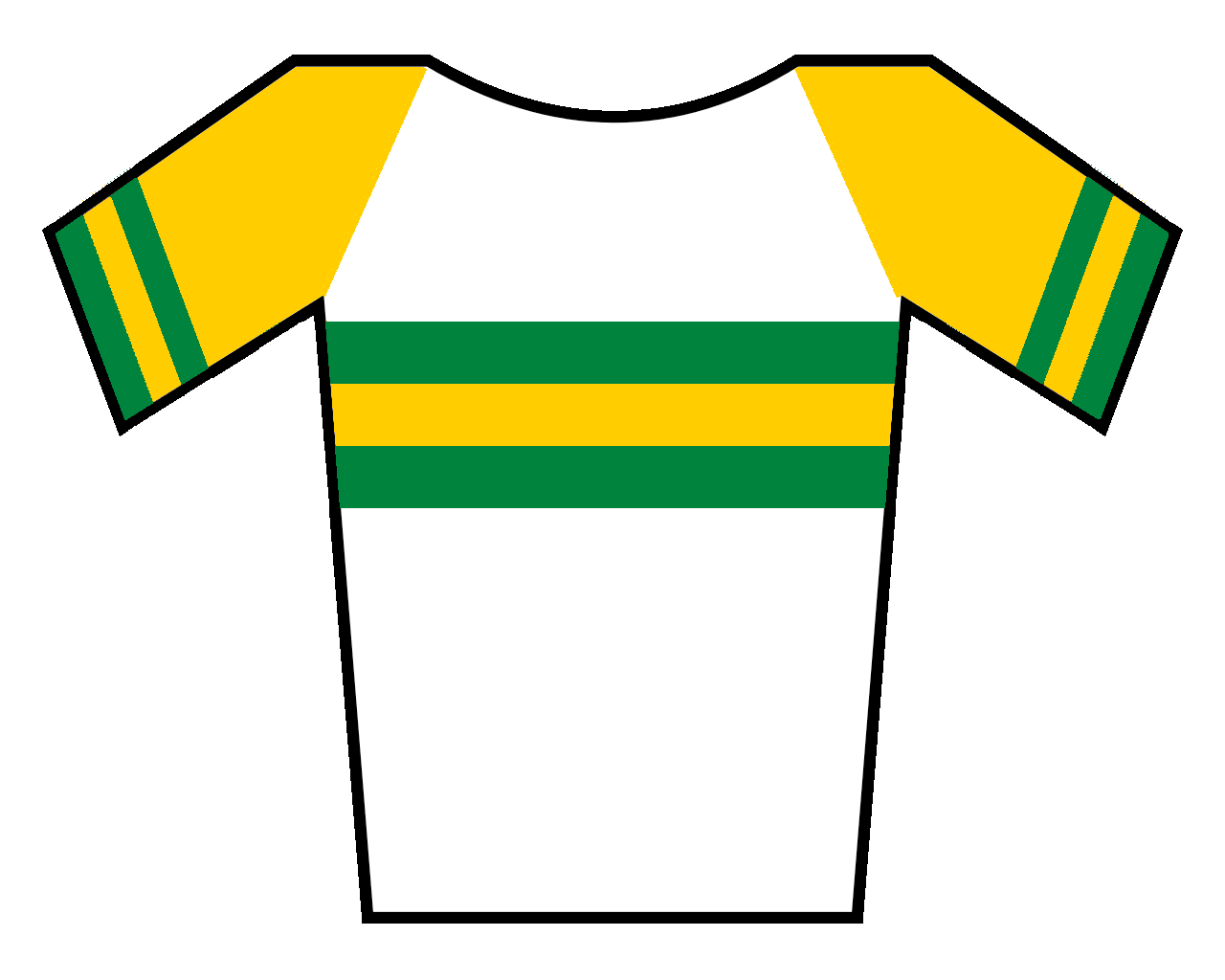
Australian Champion

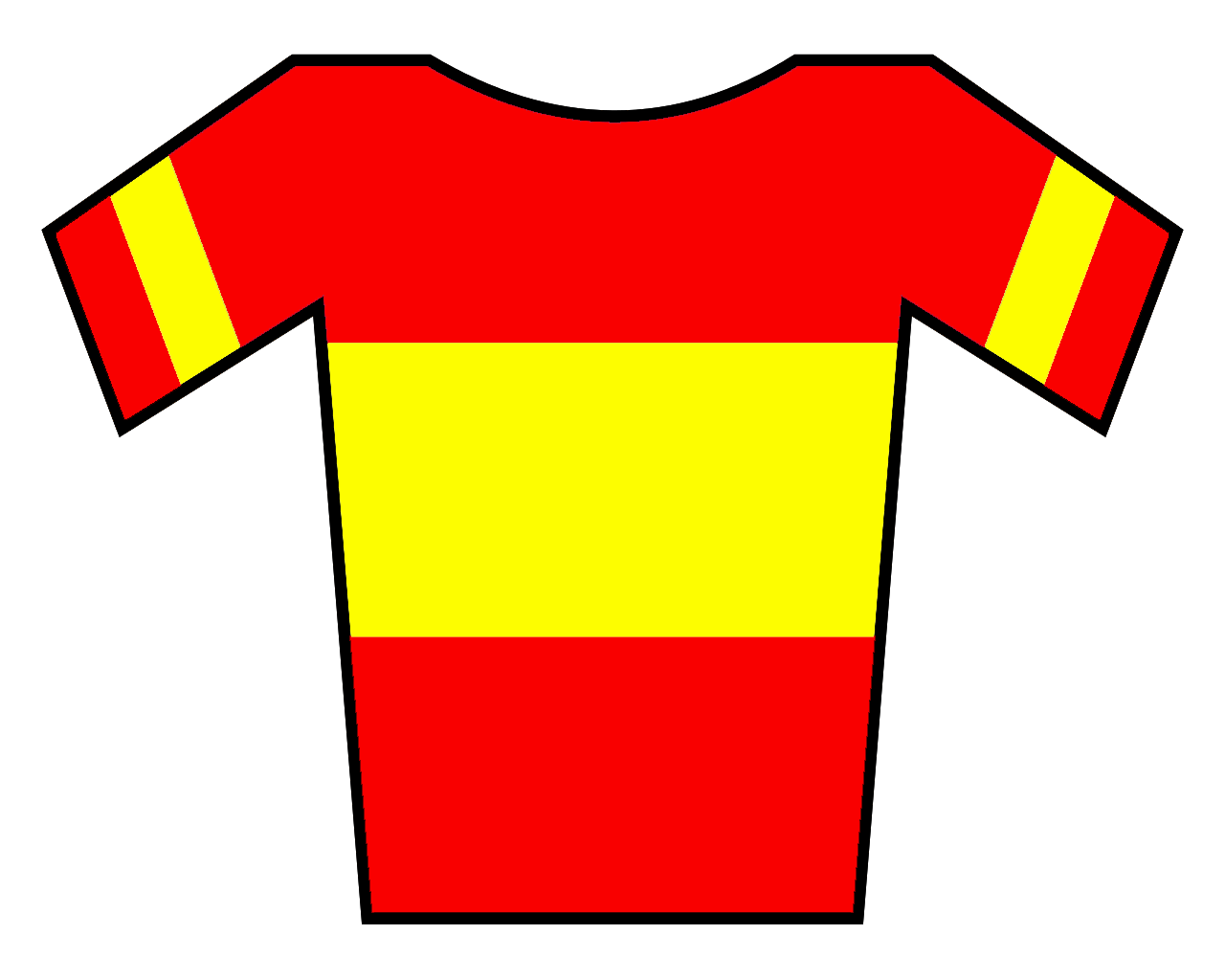
Spanish Champion

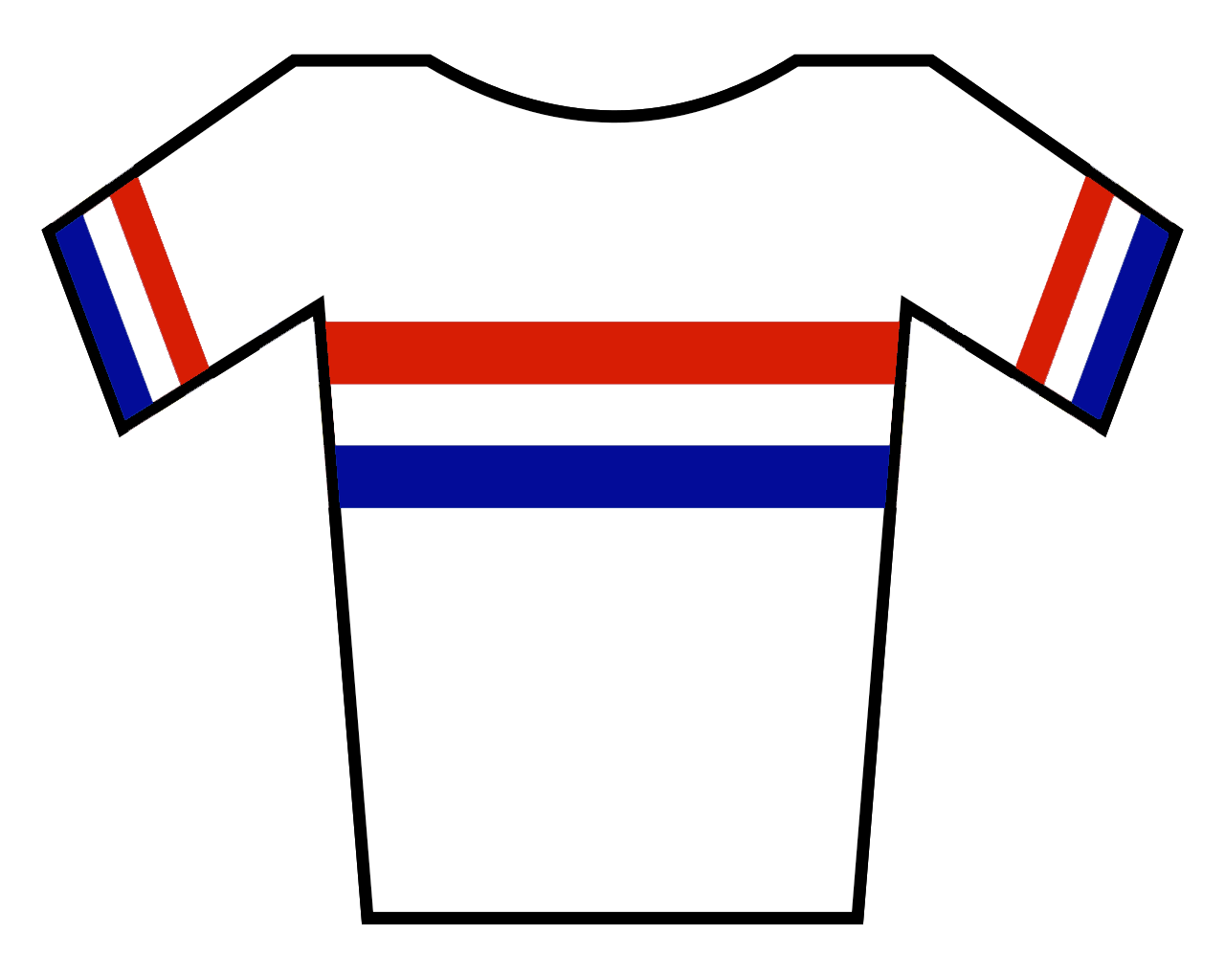
British
Champion

The winner of each national championship wears the national jersey in all their races for the next year in the respective discipline, apart from the World Championships and the Olympics, or unless they are wearing a category leader's jersey in a stage race. Most national champion jerseys tend to represent a country's flag or use the colours from it. Jerseys may also feature traditional sporting colours of a country that are not derived from a national flag, such as the green and gold on the jerseys of Australian national champions.

== 2018 champions ==
=== Men's Elite ===
Country	Men's Elite Road Race Champion	Road Race Champion's Team	Men's Elite Time Trial Champion	Time Trial Champion's Team
Albania	Ylber Sefa	Tarteletto–Isorex	Eugert Zhupa	Wilier Triestina–Selle Italia
Algeria	Youcef Reguigui	Sovac–Natura4Ever	Azzedine Lagab	Groupement Sportif des Pétroliers d'Algérie
Antigua and Barbuda	Jyme Bridges		Robert Francis Marsh	
Angola	Jose Panzo		Dario Antonio Marcelino	
Argentina	Rubén Ramos	San Juan	Emiliano Ibarra	Sindicato de Empleados Publicos de San Juan
Australia	Alex Edmondson	Mitchelton–Scott	Rohan Dennis	BMC Racing Team
Austria	Lukas Pöstlberger	Bora–Hansgrohe	Georg Preidler	Groupama–FDJ
Azerbaijan	Kirill Pozdnyakov	Synergy Baku	Elchin Asadov	Synergy Baku
Barbados	Jacob Kelly		Joshua Kelly	
Bahamas	Liam Holowesko			
Belarus	Stanislau Bazhkou	Minsk Cycling Club	Vasil Kiryienka	Team Sky
Belgium	Yves Lampaert	Quick-Step Floors	Victor Campenaerts	Lotto–Soudal
Belize	Joslyn Chavarria		Giovanni Lovell	
Bermuda	Dominique Mayho		Conor White	
Bolivia	Carlos Montellano Alvarado	Start Team Gusto	Javier Arando Ramos	
Bosnia and Herzegovina	Ivan Širić		Vedad Karić	
Botswana	Abeng Malete		Abeng Malete	
Brazil	Rodrigo Nascimento		Lauro Chaman	
Bulgaria	Nikolay Mihailov	Delko–Marseille Provence KTM	Radoslav Konstantinov	
Burkina Faso	Souleymane Koné			
Canada	Antoine Duchesne	Groupama–FDJ	Svein Tuft	Mitchelton–Scott
Cayman Islands	Michael Testori		Patrick Harfield	
Chile	Adrían Alexander Alvarado Teneb		Germán Alfredo Bustamante Aravales	
China	Yikui Niu	Mitchelton–BikeExchange	Ran Hao	
Colombia	Sergio Henao	Team Sky	Egan Bernal	Team Sky
Costa Rica	Joseph Chavarría		Brian Salas	
Croatia	Viktor Potočki	Ljubljana Gusto Xaurum	Josip Rumac	Meridiana-Kamen Team
Cyprus	Alexandros Matsangos		Andreas Miltiadis	
Cuba	Emilio Pérez		Pedro Portuondo Torres	
Czech Republic	Josef Černý	Elkov–Author	Josef Černý	Elkov–Author
Denmark	Michael Mørkøv	Quick-Step Floors	Martin Toft Madsen	BHS-Almeborg Bornholm
Dominican Republic	Adrian Núñez	Inteja Dominican Cycling Team	William de Jesús Guzmán Rosario	Inteja Dominican Cycling Team
Ecuador	Jefferson Cepeda	Team Ecuador		
El Salvador	Bryan Fernando Mendoza Ramos		Giovanni Guevara	
Eritrea	Merhawi Kudus	Team Dimension Data	Daniel Teklehaimanot	Cofidis
Estonia	Mihkel Räim	Israel Cycling Academy	Tanel Kangert	Astana
Ethiopia			Tsgabu Grmay	Trek–Segafredo
Fiji	Apisai Vakacegu		Kemueli Navunisagau	
Finland	Anders Bäckman		Johan Nordlund	
France	Anthony Roux	Groupama–FDJ	Pierre Latour	AG2R La Mondiale
Georgia	Tamaz Tsereteli		Tamaz Tsereteli	
Germany	Pascal Ackermann	Bora–Hansgrohe	Tony Martin	Team Katusha–Alpecin
Great Britain	Connor Swift	Madison Genesis	Geraint Thomas	Team Sky
Greece	Polychronis Tzortzakis	Tarteletto–Isorex	Stylianos Farantakis	Sojasun Espoir–ACNC
Guam	Mark Galedo	7 Eleven–Cliqq Roadbike Philippines		
Guatemala	Juan Mardoqueo Vasquez Vasquez		Manuel Rodas	
Guyana	Curtis Dey		Raynauth Jeffrey	
Honduras	Oscar Rodrigez			
Hong Kong	Ko Siu Wai	HKSI Pro Cycling Team	Ho Burr	HKSI Pro Cycling Team
Hungary	Barnabás Peák	Pannon Cycling Team	Barnabás Peák	UCI WCC Men's team
Iceland	Ingvar Ómarsson		Rúnar Örn Ágústsson	
India	Manjeet Singh		Arvind Panwar	
Indonesia	Abdul Gani	KFC Cycling Team	Dealton Nur Arif Prayogo	
Iran	Saeid Safarzadeh	Tabriz Shahrdary Team	Samad Pourseyedi	
Ireland	Conor Dunne	Aqua Blue Sport	Ryan Mullen	Trek–Segafredo
Israel	Roy Goldstein	Israel Cycling Academy	Omer Goldstein	Israel Cycling Academy
Italy	Elia Viviani	Quick-Step Floors	Gianni Moscon	Team Sky
Ivory Coast	Fernand Daniel Konan			
Jamaica	Russell Small		Kevin Lyons	
Japan	Genki Yamamoto	Kinan Cycling Team	Kazushige Kuboki	Bridgestone Anchor Cycling Team
Kazakhstan	Alexey Lutsenko	Astana	Daniil Fominykh	Astana
Kosovo	Rrahim Mani		Egzon Misini	
Kuwait	Saied Jafer Alali	Massi–Kuwait	Saied Jafer Alali	Massi–Kuwait
Latvia	Krists Neilands	Israel Cycling Academy	Toms Skujiņš	Trek–Segafredo
Lebanon	Elias Rachid Abou		Abdallah El Err	
Lithuania	Gediminas Bagdonas	AG2R La Mondiale	Gediminas Bagdonas	AG2R La Mondiale
Luxembourg	Bob Jungels	Quick-Step Floors	Bob Jungels	Quick-Step Floors
Macedonia	Andrej Petrovski	0711 Cycling	Andrej Petrovski	0711 Cycling
Malta	Christian Formosa		William Hili	
Mauritius	Gregory Lagane		Christopher Lagane	
Mexico	Orlando Garibay		Luis Villalobos	Aevolo
Moldova	Maxim Rusnac	Differdange–Losch	Nicolae Tanovițchii	Team Novak
Mongolia	Maral-Erdene Batmunkh		Maral-Erdene Batmunkh	Terengganu Cycling Team
Montenegro	Goran Cerović			
Morocco	Abdessadek Kouna		Abdessadek Kouna	
Namibia	Martin Freyer		Drikus Coetzee	
Netherlands	Mathieu van der Poel	Corendon–Circus	Dylan van Baarle	Team Sky
New Zealand	Jason Christie		Hamish Bond	
Nicaragua	Henry Antonio Rojas		Jose Joel Cabellero	
Norway	Vegard Stake Laengen	UAE Team Emirates	Edvald Boasson Hagen	Team Dimension Data
Panama	Cristofer Jurado		Franklin Erasmo Archibold Castillo	
Paraguay	Diego Armando Nuñez		Víctor Manuel Grange González	
Peru	Alonso Miguel Gamero	Asociacion Civil Agrupacion Virgen De Fatima		
Philippines	Jan Paul Morales		Mark Galedo	7 Eleven–Cliqq Roadbike Philippines
Poland	Michał Kwiatkowski	Team Sky	Maciej Bodnar	Bora–Hansgrohe
Portugal	Domingos Gonçalves	Rádio Popular–Boavista	Domingos Gonçalves	Rádio Popular–Boavista
Puerto Rico	Elvis Reyes		Elvis Reyes	
Qatar	Fawaz Al Hichan			
Romania	Eduard-Michael Grosu	Nippo–Vini Fantini–Europa Ovini	Eduard-Michael Grosu	Nippo–Vini Fantini–Europa Ovini
Russia	Ivan Rovny	Gazprom–RusVelo	Artem Ovechkin	Terengganu Cycling Team
Rwanda	Didier Munyaneza		Joseph Areruya	Delko–Marseille Provence KTM
Saint Lucia	Andrew Norbert			
Saint Vincent and the Grenadines	Zefal Trevor Bailey			
San Marino	Federico Caretta			
Serbia	Dušan Rajovic	Adria Mobil	Veljko Stojnic	UCI WCC Men's team
Singapore	Goh Choon Huat	Terengganu Cycling Team	Goh Choon Huat	Terengganu Cycling Team
Slovakia	Peter Sagan	Bora–Hansgrohe	Marek Čanecký	Dukla Banská Bystrica
Slovenia	Matej Mohorič	Bahrain–Merida	Jan Tratnik	CCC–Sprandi–Polkowice
South Africa	Daryl Impey	Mitchelton–Scott	Daryl Impey	Mitchelton–Scott
South Korea	Seo Joon-yong	KSPO Bianchi Asia	Choe Hyeong-min	Geumsan Insam Cello
Spain	Gorka Izagirre	Bahrain–Merida	Jonathan Castroviejo	Team Sky
Sri Lanka			Dane Nugara	
Sweden	Lucas Eriksson		Tobias Ludvigsson	Groupama–FDJ
Switzerland	Steve Morabito	Groupama–FDJ	Stefan Küng	BMC Racing Team
Trinidad and Tobago	Kemp Orosco	Team DPS	Chris Govia	
Tunisia	Ali Nouisri	VIB Sports	Ali Nouisri	VIB Sports
Turkey	Onur Balkan	Torku Şekerspor	Ahmet Örken	Salcano Sakarya Büyükşehir
Ukraine	Oleksandr Polivoda		Andriy Hrivko	Astana
United Arab Emirates	Yousif Mirza	UAE Team Emirates	Yousif Mirza	UAE Team Emirates
United States	Jonny Brown	Hagens Berman Axeon	Joey Rosskopf	BMC Racing Team
Uruguay	No result		Robert Méndez	
Uzbekistan	Akramjon Sunnatov		Muradjan Halmuratov	RTS Racing Team
Venezuela	Ralph Monsalve	Qinghai Tianyoude Cycling Team	Pedro Gutiérrez	Qinghai Tianyoude Cycling Team
Vietnam	Truong Tai Nguyen		Tan Hoai Nguyen	

==== Champions in UCI WorldTeams ====
Team	Road Race Champions	Time Trial Champions
AG2R La Mondiale	Gediminas Bagdonas (LTU)	Pierre Latour (FRA); Gediminas Bagdonas (LTU)
Astana	Alexey Lutsenko (KAZ)	Tanel Kangert (EST); Daniil Fominykh (KAZ); Andriy Hrivko (UKR)
Bahrain–Merida	Matej Mohorič (SLO); Gorka Izagirre (ESP)	
BMC Racing Team		Rohan Dennis (AUS); Stefan Küng (SUI); Joey Rosskopf (USA)
Bora–Hansgrohe	Lukas Pöstlberger (AUT); Pascal Ackermann (GER); Peter Sagan (SVK)	Maciej Bodnar (POL)
EF Education First–Drapac p/b Cannondale		
Groupama–FDJ	Antoine Duchesne (CAN); Anthony Roux (FRA); Steve Morabito (SUI)	Georg Preidler (AUT); Tobias Ludvigsson (SWE)
Lotto–Soudal		Victor Campenaerts (BEL)
LottoNL–Jumbo		
Mitchelton–Scott	Alex Edmondson (AUS); Daryl Impey (RSA)	Svein Tuft (CAN); Daryl Impey (RSA)
Movistar Team		
Quick-Step Floors	Yves Lampaert (BEL); Michael Mørkøv (DEN); Elia Viviani (ITA); Bob Jungels (LUX)	Bob Jungels (LUX)
Team Dimension Data	Merhawi Kudus (ERI)	Edvald Boasson Hagen (NOR)
Team Katusha–Alpecin		Tony Martin (GER)
Team Sky	Sergio Henao (COL); Michał Kwiatkowski (POL)	Vasil Kiryienka (BLR); Egan Bernal (COL); Geraint Thomas (GBR); Dylan van Baarle (NED); Jonathan Castroviejo (ESP); Gianni Moscon (ITA)
Team Sunweb		
Trek–Segafredo		Tsgabu Grmay (ETH); Ryan Mullen (IRL); Toms Skujiņš (LAT)
UAE Team Emirates	Vegard Stake Laengen (NOR); Yousif Mirza (UAE)	Yousif Mirza (UAE)

=== Women's Elite ===
Country	Women's Elite Road Race Champion	Road Race Champion's Team	Women's Elite Time Trial Champion	Time Trial Champion's Team
Algeria	Racha Belkacem Ben Ouanane		Racha Belkacem Ben Ouanane	
Argentina	Maribel Aguirre	Weber Shimano Ladies Power	Estefania Pilz	Autoglas Wetteren Cycling Team
Australia	Shannon Malseed	Tibco–Silicon Valley Bank	Katrin Garfoot	
Austria	Sarah Rijkes	Experza–Footlogix	Martina Ritter	Wiggle High5
Azerbaijan	Olena Pavlukhina	BTC City Ljubljana	Olena Pavlukhina	BTC City Ljubljana
Belarus	Alena Amialiusik	Canyon//SRAM	Alena Amialiusik	Canyon//SRAM
Belgium	Annelies Dom	Lotto–Soudal Ladies	Ann-Sophie Duyck	Cervélo–Bigla Pro Cycling
Belize	Alicia Thompson		Kaya Cattouse	
Bermuda	Caitlyn Conyers		Caitlyn Conyers	
Botswana	Promise Ntshese		Tsaone Latiwa	
Brazil	Flávia Oliveira	Health Mate–Cyclelive Team	Tamires Fanny Radatz	AVAI F.C.–FME Florianópolis–APGF
Canada	Katherine Maine	Rally Cycling	Leah Kirchmann	Team Sunweb
Chile	Aranza Villalon Sanchez		Aranza Villalon Sanchez	
Costa Rica	Maria José Vargas	Swapit–Agolico	Maria José Vargas	Swapit–Agolico
Croatia	Mia Radotić	BTC City Ljubljana	Mia Radotić	BTC City Ljubljana
Cuba	Yudelmis Domínguez Masague		Marlies Mejías Garcia	Twenty20 p/b Sho-Air
Cyprus	Antri Christoforou	Cogeas–Mettler Pro Cycling Team	Antri Christoforou	Cogeas–Mettler Pro Cycling Team
Czech Republic	Jarmila Machačová	Team Dukla Praha	Tereza Korvasova	Team Dukla Praha
Denmark	Amalie Dideriksen	Boels–Dolmans	Cecilie Uttrup Ludwig	Cervélo–Bigla Pro Cycling
Dominican Republic	Samia Flores		Juana Isidra Fernandez	
Ecuador			Nicole Narvaez	
El Salvador	Adriana Alejandra Alfaro		Roxana Ortiz	
Estonia	Liisa Ehrberg	Jos Feron Lady Force	Liisi Rist	
Ethiopia	Selam Amha		Selam Amha	
Finland	Lotta Lepistö	Cervélo–Bigla Pro Cycling	Lotta Lepistö	Cervélo–Bigla Pro Cycling
France	Aude Biannic	Movistar Team	Audrey Cordon	Wiggle High5
Germany	Liane Lippert	Team Sunweb	Lisa Brennauer	Wiggle High5
Great Britain	Jessica Roberts		Hannah Barnes	Canyon//SRAM
Greece	Argiro Milaki	Servetto–Stradalli Cycle–Alurecycling	Varvara Fasoi	
Guatemala	Jazmin Gabriela Soto		Nicolle Bruderer	Tibco–Silicon Valley Bank
Hong Kong	Yao Pang		Qianyu Yang	
Hungary	Barbara Benkó		Adrienn Hajnal	
India	Yanthi Fuchiyanti		Yanthi Fuchiyanti	
Iceland	Agusta Edda Björnsdottir		Rannveig Anna Guicharnaud	
Iran	Frouzan Abdollahi		Maryam Jalaliyeh	
Ireland	Eve Mccrystal		Kelly Murphy	
Israel	Omer Shapira	Cylance Pro Cycling	Rotem Gafinovitz	WaowDeals Pro Cycling
Italy	Marta Cavalli	Valcar–PBM		
Japan	Eri Yonamine	Wiggle High5	Eri Yonamine	Wiggle High5
Kazakhstan	Natalya Saifutdinova	Astana	Natalya Saifutdinova	Astana
South Korea	Ah Reum Na		Ahreum Na	
Kuwait	Najla Aljuraiwi		Latefa Alyaseen	
Latvia	Lija Laizāne	Aromitalia Vaiano	Lija Laizāne	Aromitalia Vaiano
Lithuania	Rasa Leleivytė	Aromitalia Vaiano	Daiva Tušlaitė	Alé–Cipollini
Luxembourg	Christine Majerus	Boels–Dolmans	Christine Majerus	Boels–Dolmans
Macedonia			Aneta Antovska	
Mexico	Brenda Andrea Santoyo	Swapit–Agolico	Íngrid Drexel	Tibco–Silicon Valley Bank
Moldova	Miroslava Vasilenco		Miroslava Vasilenco	
Mongolia	Jamsran Ulzii-Solongo	Jamsran Ulzii-Solongo		
Morocco	Fatima Zahra El Hiyani		Fatima Zahra El Hiyani	
Namibia	Vera Adrian	RE/MAX Cycling Team	Irene Steyn	
Netherlands	Chantal Blaak	Boels–Dolmans	Ellen van Dijk	Team Sunweb
New Zealand	Georgia Williams	Mitchelton–Scott	Georgia Williams	Mitchelton–Scott
Nicaragua	Halima Jiminez		Halima Jiminez	
Norway	Vita Heine	Hitec Products–Birk Sport	Line Marie Gulliksen	Hitec Products–Birk Sport
Panama	Yineth Kellyam Cubilla		Anibel Prieto	
Paraguay	Aracely Jazmin Galeano		Aracely Jazmin Galeano	
Peru	Angie Marielle Paulett			
Philippines			Jermyn Prado	
Poland	Małgorzata Jasińska	Movistar Team	Małgorzata Jasińska	Movistar Team
Portugal	Daniela Reis	Doltcini–Van Eyck Sport	Daniela Reis	Doltcini–Van Eyck Sport
Puerto Rico	Donelys Cariño		Donelys Cariño	
Qatar			Tala Abujbara	
South Africa	Carla Oberholzer	Demacon Ladies Cycling Team	Liezel Jordaan	
Romania	Ana Covrig	Eurotarget–Bianchi–Vitasana	Ana Covrig	Eurotarget–Bianchi–Vitasana
Russia	Margarita Syrodoeva		Olga Zabelinskaya	Cogeas–Mettler Pro Cycling Team
Rwanda	Xaverine Nirere		Jacqueline Tuyishimire	
Serbia	Jelena Erić	Cylance Pro Cycling	Jelena Erić	Cylance Pro Cycling
Singapore	Jer Ling Lee		Ling Er Choo	
Slovenia	Polona Batagelj	BTC City Ljubljana	Eugenia Bujak	BTC City Ljubljana
Spain	Eider Merino	Movistar Team	Margarita Victoria Garcia	Movistar Team
Slovakia	Tereza Medveďová	Bepink	Tatiana Jaseková	
Sweden	Emilia Fahlin	Wiggle High5	Lisa Nordén	
Switzerland	Jolanda Neff		Nicole Hanselmann	Cervélo–Bigla Pro Cycling
Turkey	Ece Calp		Esin Yilmaz	
Ukraine			Valeriya Kononenko	
United States	Coryn Rivera	Team Sunweb	Amber Neben	
Uzbekistan	Ekaterina Knebeleva	Al Asayl Cycling Team	Renata Baymetova	Al Asayl Cycling Team
Venezuela	Ingrid Mayeli Porras		Danielys Del Valle García	

==== Champions in UCI Women's teams ====
Team	Road Race Champions	Time Trial Champions
Al Asayl Cycling Team	Ekaterina Knebeleva (UZB)	Renata Baymetova (UZB)
Alé–Cipollini		Daiva Tušlaitė (LTU)
Aromitalia Vaiano	Lija Laizāne (LAT); Rasa Leleivytė (LTU)	Lija Laizāne (LAT)
Astana	Natalya Saifutdinova (KAZ)	Natalya Saifutdinova (KAZ)
Bepink		
Bizkaia Durango–Euskadi Murias		
Boels–Dolmans	Amalie Dideriksen (DEN); Christine Majerus (LUX); Chantal Blaak (NED)	Christine Majerus (LUX)
BTC City Ljubljana	Olena Pavlukhina (AZE); Polona Batagelj (SLO)	Olena Pavlukhina (AZE); Mia Radotić (CRO); Eugenia Bujak (SLO)
Canyon//SRAM	Alena Amialiusik (BLR)	Alena Amialiusik (BLR); Hannah Barnes (GBR)
Cervélo–Bigla Pro Cycling	Lotta Lepistö (FIN)	Ann-Sophie Duyck (BEL); Cecilie Uttrup Ludwig (DEN); Lotta Lepistö (FIN); Nicole Hanselmann (SUI)
China Chongming–Liv		
Cogeas–Mettler Pro Cycling Team	Antri Christoforou (CYP)	Antri Christoforou (CYP); Olga Zabelinskaya (RUS)
Conceria Zabri–Fanini		
Cylance Pro Cycling	Omer Shapira (ISR)	Jelena Erić (SER)
Doltcini–Van Eyck Sport UCI Women Cycling	Daniela Reis (POR)	Daniela Reis (POR)
Eurotarget–Bianchi–Vitasana	Ana Covrig (ROM)	Ana Covrig (ROM)
Experza–Footlogix Ladies Cycling Team	Sarah Rijkes (AUT)	
FDJ Nouvelle-Aquitaine Futuroscope		
Hagens Berman–Supermint		
Health Mate–Cyclelive Team	Flávia Oliveira (BRA)	
Hitec Products–Birk Sport	Vita Heine (NOR)	Line Marie Gulliksen (NOR)
Lotto–Soudal Ladies	Annelies Dom (BEL)	
Minsk Cycling Club		
Mitchelton–Scott	Georgia Williams (NZL)	Georgia Williams (NZL)
Movistar Team	Aude Biannic (FRA); Eider Merino (ESP); Małgorzata Jasińska (POL)	Margarita Victoria Garcia (ESP); Małgorzata Jasińska (POL)
Rally Cycling	Katherine Maine (CAN)	
S.C. Michela Fanini Rox		
Servetto–Stradalli Cycle–Alurecycling	Argiro Milaki (GRE)	
Sopela Women's Team		
Still Bike Team A.S. Dilettantistica		
Storey Racing		
Swapit–Agolico	Maria José Vargas (CRC)	Maria José Vargas (CRC)
Team Dukla Praha	Jarmila Machačová (CZE)	Tereza Korvasova (CZE)
Team Illuminate		
Team Sunweb	Liane Lippert (GER); Coryn Rivera (USA)	Leah Kirchmann (CAN); Ellen van Dijk (NED)
Team Virtu Cycling		
Thailand Women's Cycling Team		
Tibco–Silicon Valley Bank	Shannon Malseed (AUS)	Nicolle Bruderer (GUA); Íngrid Drexel (MEX)
Top Girls Fassa Bortolo		
Trek–Drops		
TWENTY20 p/b Sho-Air		Marlies Mejías Garcia (CUB)
UnitedHealthcare		
Valcar–PBM	Marta Cavalli (ITA)	
Wiggle High5	Eri Yonamine (JPN); Emilia Fahlin (SWE)	Martina Ritter (AUT); Audrey Cordon (FRA); Lisa Brennauer (GER); Eri Yonamine (JPN)
WaowDeals Pro Cycling		Rotem Gafinovitz (ISR)
WNT–Rotor Pro Cycling		

== See also ==
- 2018 in men's road cycling
- 2018 in women's road cycling
