= List of Uzbekistani records in track cycling =

The following are the national records in track cycling in Uzbekistan, maintained by its national cycling federation, Uzbekistan Cycling Federation.

== Men ==
Event	Record	Athlete	Date	Meet	Place	Ref
Flying 200 m time trial						
Flying 500 m time trial						
500 m time trial						
Flying 1 km time trial						
1 km time trial						
Team sprint						
4000 m individual pursuit	4:21.570	Aleksey Fomovskiy	16 June 2023	Asian Championships	Nilai, Malaysia	
4000 m team pursuit	4:09.217	Aleksey Fomovskiy; Dmitriy Bocharov; Edem Eminov; Nikita Tsvetkov	14 June 2023	Asian Championships	Nilai, Malaysia	
Hour record						

== Women ==
Event	Record	Athlete	Date	Meet	Place	Ref
Flying 200 m time trial						
250 m time trial (standing start)	21.730	Ekaterina Knebeleva	10 January 2019	Asian Championships	Jakarta, Indonesia	
500 m time trial	38.662	Ekaterina Knebeleva	10 January 2019	Asian Championships	Jakarta, Indonesia	
Team sprint						
3000 m individual pursuit	3:37.024	Yanina Kuskova	16 June 2023	Asian Championships	Nilai, Malaysia	
4000m individual pursuit	4:49.190	Yanina Kuskova	28 March 2026	Asian Championships	Tagaytay, Philippines	
4000 m team pursuit	4:32.106	Margarita Misyurina; Olga Zabelinskaya; Nafosat Kozieva; Yanina Kuskova	14 June 2023	Asian Championships	Nilai, Malaysia	
Hour record						
