= Cycling at the 2006 Asian Games – Men's team time trial =

Men's team time trial at the 2006 Asian Games
- Venue: Al-Khor Road Course
- Date: 6 December 2006
- Competitors: 64 from 16 nations

Medalists
gold medal	Kazakhstan; Ilya Chernyshov, Alexandr Dymovskikh, Dmitriy Gruzdev, Andrey Mizurov
silver medal	Iran; Hossein Askari, Alireza Haghi, Ghader Mizbani, Abbas Saeidi Tanha
bronze medal	Japan; Yoshiyuki Abe, Kazuya Okazaki, Satoshi Hirose, Kazuhiro Mori

The men's 70.3 km road team time trial competition at the 2006 Asian Games was held on 6 December at the Al-Khor Road Course.

== Schedule ==
All times are Arabia Standard Time (UTC+03:00)

Date	Time	Event
Wednesday, 6 December 2006	12:30	Final

== Results ==
Legend

- DNS — Did not start

Rank	Team	Time
1st place, gold medalist(s)	Kazakhstan (KAZ); Ilya Chernyshov; Alexandr Dymovskikh; Dmitriy Gruzdev; Andrey Mizurov	1:24:40.67
2nd place, silver medalist(s)	Iran (IRI); Hossein Askari; Alireza Haghi; Ghader Mizbani; Abbas Saeidi Tanha	1:25:56.60
3rd place, bronze medalist(s)	Japan (JPN); Yoshiyuki Abe; Kazuya Okazaki; Satoshi Hirose; Kazuhiro Mori	1:26:01.49
4	South Korea (KOR); Park Sung-baek; Jang Sun-jae; Kim Dong-hun; Youm Jung-hwan	1:27:34.56
5	Uzbekistan (UZB); Azizbek Abdurahimov; Nikolay Kazakbaev; Ruslan Mihaylov; Vladimir Tuychiev	1:28:17.19
6	Mongolia (MGL); Boldbaataryn Bold-Erdene; Jamsrangiin Ölzii-Orshikh; Khayankhyarvaagiin Uuganbayar; Tuulkhangain Tögöldör	1:29:24.57
7	Hong Kong (HKG); Wong Kam Po; Wu Kin San; Cheung King Wai; Chan Chun Hing	1:29:41.35
8	United Arab Emirates (UAE); Ahmed Al-Hanadsa; Badr Mirza; Mohamed Khalil Took; Khalid Ali Shambih	1:30:33.55
9	Philippines (PHI); Santy Barnachea; Warren Davadilla; Frederick Feliciano; Arnel Quirimit	1:31:44.98
10	Bahrain (BRN); Ahmed Al-Doseri; Duaij Al-Doseri; Jamal Al-Doseri; Mohamed Husain	1:32:55.55
11	Saudi Arabia (KSA); Jaber Majrashi; Ayman Al-Habriti; Bader Al-Yasin; Ahmed Assiri	1:33:16.20
12	Qatar (QAT); Khalil Al-Rahman; Abdullah Afif; Radhwan Al-Moraqab; Tareq Esmaeili	1:37:06.07
13	Malaysia (MAS); Mohd Akmal Amrun; Shahrulneeza Razali; Mohd Jasmin Ruslan; Amir Mustafa Rusli	1:37:29.08
14	Iraq (IRQ); Farkad Jassim; Asaad Ali; Mohsen Fadhel; Yassir Ziaoddin	1:38:28.32
15	Sri Lanka (SRI); Thusitha Dinesh; Hemantha Kumara; Upul Lokuge; Sudeera Nilanga	1:40:44.05
—	Syria (SYR); Saddam Al-Saayo; Ahmad Hakmi; Omar Hasanin; Fadi Shaikhouni	DNS
