= Grand Prix Mediterranean WE =

Grand Prix Mediterrennean WE
Race details
- Date: March
- Region: Turkey
- Discipline: Road
- Type: One-day race

History
- First edition: 2021
- Editions: 2 (as of 2022)
- First winner: Hanna Tserakh (BLR)
- Most wins: No repeat winners
- Most recent: Yanina Kuskova (UZB)

Grand Prix Mediterrennean WE is a One-day race cycling race, held annually in Turkey. The race is rated 1.2 on the UCI race classifications.

== Winners ==
Year	Country	Rider	Team
2021	Belarus	Hanna Tserakh	Minsk Cycling Club
2022	Uzbekistan	Yanina Kuskova	Tashkent City Women Professional Cycling Team
