= Tashkent City Women Professional Cycling Team =

Uzbekistan cycling team

Team information
- UCI code: TCW (2022–2024)
- Registered: Uzbekistan
- Founded: 2022
- Disbanded: 2024
- Discipline: Road
- Status: UCI Women's Continental Team (2022–2024)

Team name history
- 2022–2024: Tashkent City Women Professional Cycling Team

Tashkent City Women Professional Cycling Team was an Uzbekistan women's road bicycle racing team, established in 2022, which participated in elite women's races.

Following an accrual of points in controversial circumstances in 2023, the team was automatically invited to all 2024 UCI Women's World Tour, including the 2024 Tour de France Femmes. The team folded at the end of the 2024 season.

== History ==
The team was founded in 2022, backed by the Uzbekistan Cycling Federation with the aim to have riders qualify for the 2024 Summer Olympics.

In 2023, the team's season consisted of mostly races in Asia, with Rouleur noting that over half of their UCI points were acquired at the Uzbekistan National Championships, from Tashkent City Women riders in both elite and under-23 races. By the end of 2023, the team had gained enough points to be ranked one of the top two UCI Women's Continental Teams. This would allow the team wildcard entry into all 2024 UCI Women's World Tour events, as well as qualify for the 2024 Summer Olympics. Other teams disputed their 2023 points total, suggesting that some races did not meet minimum standard for UCI points. Following an investigation by the UCI, it was confirmed that the team would gain automatic entry into all 2024 UCI Women's World Tour events.

=== 2024 ===
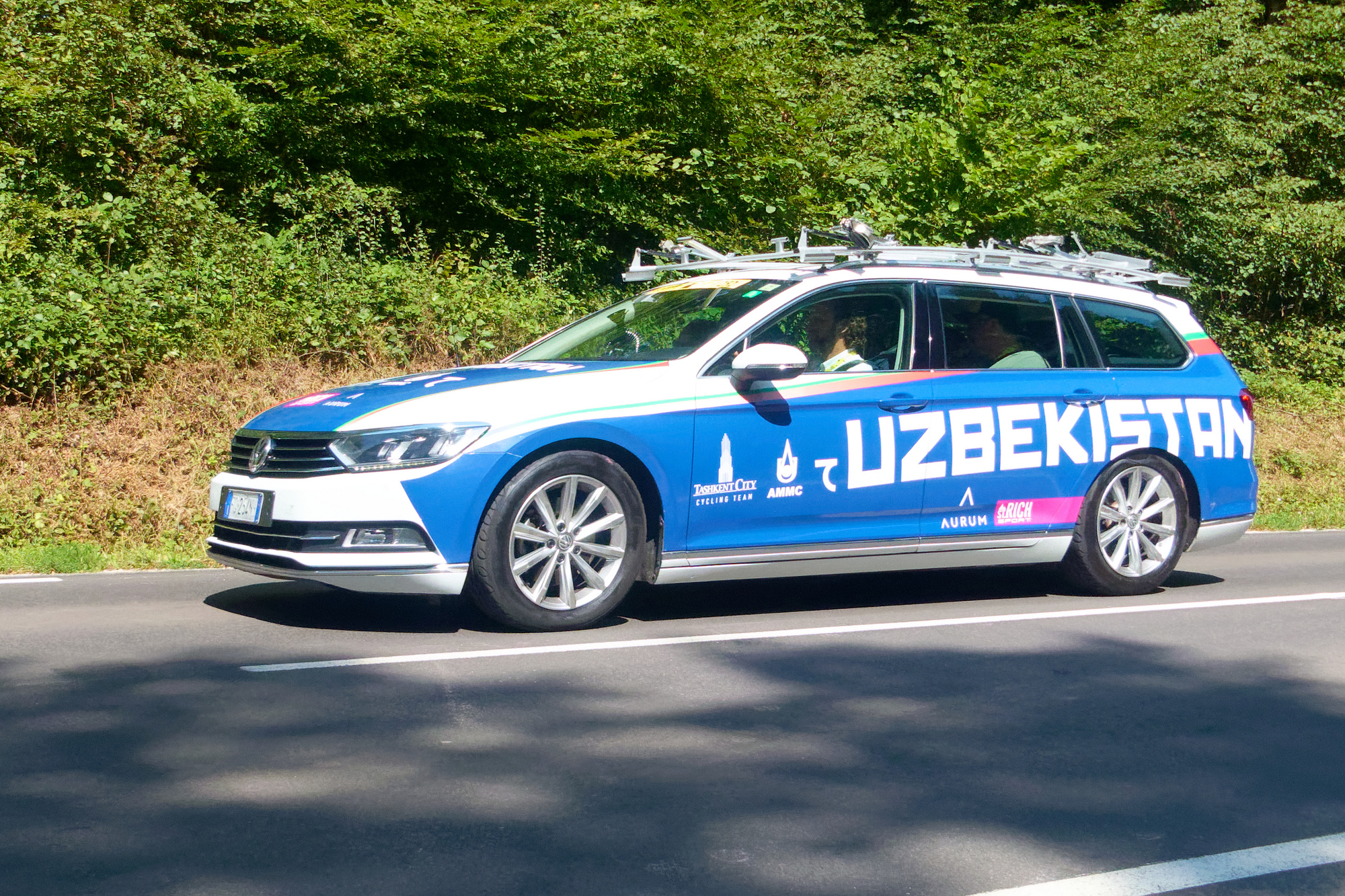
Team car at 2024 Tour de France Femmes

The team planned a limited roster of WorldTour events owing to a tight budget, with coach Gleb Groysman admitting that the focus of the team was competing at the Olympic Games. The team opened its 2024 season at the Women's Tour Down Under. The team were criticised at the 2024 Tour de France Femmes, with four riders abandoning the race on stage 1, after they were unable to keep with the pace of the peloton on the flat stage. Yanina Kuskova was the only rider of the team to finish the race, placing 47th overall.

The team folded at the end of the 2024 season, due to the "lack of elite cycling infrastructure in Uzbekistan" and completion of the goal to qualify for the 2024 Summer Olympics. Kuskova subsequently signed with Laboral Kutxa–Fundación Euskadi for the 2025 season.

== Team roster ==
Rider	Date of birth
Shaknoza Abdullaeva (UZB)	25 October 2001 (age 24)
Evgeniya Golotina (UZB)	18 October 2002 (age 23)
Madina Kakhorova (UZB)	9 June 2002 (age 24)
Nafosat Kozieva (UZB)	31 July 1998 (age 28)
Anna Kulikova (UZB)	19 March 2001 (age 25)
Yanina Kuskova (UZB)	11 December 2001 (age 24)
Margarita Misyurina (UZB)	16 April 2003 (age 23)
Elena Zaytseva (UZB)	28 August 2001 (age 25)

== Major results ==
2022
Grand Prix Mediterrennean, Yanina Kuskova

2023
Expo Kriteryum, Yanina Kuskova
The Tour Oqtosh–Chorvoq–Mountain Ladies I, Olga Zabelinskaya
The Tour Oqtosh–Chorvoq–Mountain Ladies II, Margarita Misyurina
Tour of Bostonliq I Ladies, Yanina Kuskova
Tour of Bostonliq II Ladies, Yanina Kuskova
Grand Prix Kaisareia, Olga Zabelinskaya

== Continental & National Champions ==
2022
Uzbekistan Road race, Shaknoza Abdullaeva
Uzbekistan Time trial, Margarita Misyurina
Asia Team Time Trial
Asia U23 Time Trial, Yanina Kuskova

2023
Uzbekistan Time trial, Olga Zabelinskaya
Uzbekistan U23 Time trial, Yanina Kuskova
Uzbekistan Road race, Yanina Kuskova
Uzbekistan U23 Road race, Sofiya Karimova
