= Cycling at the 2006 Asian Games – Men's points race =

Men's points race at the 2006 Asian Games
- Venue: Aspire Hall 1
- Date: 12–13 December 2006
- Competitors: 26 from 13 nations

Medalists
gold medal	Cheung King Wai	Hong Kong
silver medal	Vladimir Tuychiev	Uzbekistan
bronze medal	Ilya Chernyshov	Kazakhstan

The men's 25 km points race competition at the 2006 Asian Games was held on the 12th and 13 December at the Aspire Hall 1.

== Schedule ==
All times are Arabia Standard Time (UTC+03:00)

Date	Time	Event
Tuesday, 12 December 2006	14:26	Qualifying
Wednesday, 13 December 2006	13:20	Final

== Results ==
Legend

- DNF — Did not finish

=== Qualifying ===
==== Heat 1 ====
Rank	Athlete	Sprint						Laps		Total	Finish order
Rank	Athlete	1	2	3	4	5	6	+	−	Total	Finish order
1	Chen Xiaoyong (CHN)		5		1			20		26	7
2	Cheung King Wai (HKG)		3		2			20		25	11
3	Makoto Iijima (JPN)		2	1				20		23	9
4	Berik Kupeshov (KAZ)	1						20		21	8
5	Abbas Saeidi Tanha (IRI)		1					20		21	12
6	Joo Hyun-wook (KOR)	3		2	5	3	2			15	3
7	Chen Keng-hsien (TPE)				3	5	5			13	1
8	Harrif Saleh (MAS)	5		3		2	3			13	2
9	Vladimir Tuychiev (UZB)	2		5		1				8	5
10	Mat Nur (INA)						1			1	4
11	Paterno Curtan (PHI)									0	6
12	Hamad Salem Afif (QAT)									0	10
—	Husain Ebrahim (BRN)									DNF	

==== Heat 2 ====
Rank	Athlete	Sprint						Laps		Total	Finish order
Rank	Athlete	1	2	3	4	5	6	+	−	Total	Finish order
1	Nikolay Kazakbaev (UZB)	3	3				2	20		28	3
2	Ilya Chernyshov (KAZ)		5			2		20		27	10
3	Samai Amari (INA)				1		5	20		26	1
4	Youm Jung-hwan (KOR)				5		1	20		26	4
5	Reona Sumi (JPN)	5						20		25	12
6	Wu Po-hung (TPE)			2	2			20		24	5
7	Hossein Askari (IRI)				3			20		23	9
8	Wong Kam Po (HKG)			5		5				10	8
9	Wen Hairui (CHN)	1		3			3			7	2
10	Mohd Jasmin Ruslan (MAS)		1	1		3				5	11
11	Alfie Catalan (PHI)		2			1				3	6
12	Moosa Khalfan Said (QAT)	2								2	7
—	Mohamed Husain (BRN)									DNF	

=== Final ===
Rank	Athlete	Sprint																Laps		Total	Finish order
Rank	Athlete	1	2	3	4	5	6	7	8	9	10	11	12	13	14	15	16	+	−	Total	Finish order
1st place, gold medalist(s)	Cheung King Wai (HKG)						3			5		3		5	3		3			22	2
2nd place, silver medalist(s)	Vladimir Tuychiev (UZB)					3	2				3	5				5				18	9
3rd place, bronze medalist(s)	Ilya Chernyshov (KAZ)	3								3			1	3	2		5			17	1
4	Makoto Iijima (JPN)						1	3					3			2	1			10	4
5	Joo Hyun-wook (KOR)		5	5	2			5	1				2		5	3			20	8	13
6	Wu Po-hung (TPE)	2									2	2				1				7	7
7	Hossein Askari (IRI)							1		1				2						4	8
8	Reona Sumi (JPN)			2		5			5		5				1				20	−2	6
9	Wen Hairui (CHN)				3		5	2	2				5						20	−3	5
10	Wong Kam Po (HKG)		2									1					2		20	−15	3
11	Mohd Jasmin Ruslan (MAS)		1	1						2									20	−16	11
12	Youm Jung-hwan (KOR)	1			1						1			1					20	−16	12
13	Nikolay Kazakbaev (UZB)																		20	−20	10
—	Mat Nur (INA)																		20	DNF	
—	Chen Xiaoyong (CHN)	5		3	5	1													20	DNF	
—	Berik Kupeshov (KAZ)																		20	DNF	
—	Harrif Saleh (MAS)								3										40	DNF	
—	Samai Amari (INA)																		40	DNF	
—	Abbas Saeidi Tanha (IRI)																			DNF	
—	Chen Keng-hsien (TPE)		3			2													40	DNF	
