= Dmitry Bocharov =

Dmitry Bocharov may refer to:

- Dmitry Bocharov (chess player)
- Dmitriy Bocharov (cyclist)
