= Cycling at the 2010 Asian Games – Men's points race =

Men's points race at the 2010 Asian Games
- Venue: Guangzhou Velodrome
- Date: 16–17 November 2010
- Competitors: 28 from 15 nations

Medalists
gold medal	Vladimir Tuychiev	Uzbekistan
silver medal	Wong Kam Po	Hong Kong
bronze medal	Mehdi Sohrabi	Iran

The men's 30 kilometres points race competition at the 2010 Asian Games was held on 16 and 17 November at the Guangzhou Velodrome.

== Schedule ==
All times are China Standard Time (UTC+08:00)

Date	Time	Event
Tuesday, 16 November 2010	14:30	Qualifying
Wednesday, 17 November 2010	11:16	Final

== Results ==
Legend

- DNF — Did not finish

=== Qualifying ===
==== Heat 1 ====
Rank	Athlete	Sprint						Laps		Total	Finish order
Rank	Athlete	1	2	3	4	5	6	+	−	Total	Finish order
1	Jang Sun-jae (KOR)					5	3	40		48	2
2	Amir Mustafa Rusli (MAS)				2	3	1	40		46	4
3	Taiji Nishitani (JPN)		3			2		40		45	12
4	Wu Po-hung (TPE)					1		40		41	8
5	Kwok Ho Ting (HKG)	5			1			20		26	6
6	Mehdi Sohrabi (IRI)				5			20		25	9
7	Vadim Shaekhov (UZB)	1						20		21	7
8	Alexey Lyalko (KAZ)	2	2	2			5			11	1
9	Li Wei (CHN)			5	3					8	11
10	Sultan Assiri (KSA)		5							5	10
11	Ahmed Al-Bardiny (QAT)	3		1						4	14
12	Rajender Kumar Bishnoi (IND)			3						3	5
13	John Mier (PHI)								2	2	3
14	Yousif Mirza (UAE)		1							1	13

==== Heat 2 ====
Rank	Athlete	Sprint						Laps		Total	Finish order
Rank	Athlete	1	2	3	4	5	6	+	−	Total	Finish order
1	Vladimir Tuychiev (UZB)	3		5		3				11	8
2	Xu Gang (CHN)	5				5				10	11
3	Cho Ho-sung (KOR)		5		3					8	9
4	Adiq Husainie Othman (MAS)		3	1			3			7	2
5	Abbas Saeidi Tanha (IRI)		2	3		1				6	7
6	Kazuhiro Mori (JPN)						5			5	1
7	Wong Kam Po (HKG)			2	2		1			5	4
8	Huang Hsin-hua (TPE)		1		1		2			4	3
9	Yevgeniy Sladkov (KAZ)					2				2	5
10	Atul Kumar (IND)									0	6
11	Khalil Al-Rahman (QAT)									0	12
12	Mohammed Al-Murawwi (UAE)	1			5				20	−14	10
13	George Oconer (PHI)	2							40	−38	13
—	Bader Al-Yasin (KSA)								20	DNF	

=== Final ===
Rank	Athlete	Sprint												Laps		Total	Finish order
Rank	Athlete	1	2	3	4	5	6	7	8	9	10	11	12	+	−	Total	Finish order
1st place, gold medalist(s)	Vladimir Tuychiev (UZB)	3		3				1	3			1		60		71	9
2nd place, silver medalist(s)	Wong Kam Po (HKG)				3			2		5	5	3	2	40		60	3
3rd place, bronze medalist(s)	Mehdi Sohrabi (IRI)	5		5				3	5	1			1	40		60	4
4	Alexey Lyalko (KAZ)					3			1		2	5	5	40		56	1
5	Adiq Husainie Othman (MAS)	1		2			5		2	3	1	2		40		56	5
6	Kazuhiro Mori (JPN)				5	5				2				40		52	10
7	Wu Po-hung (TPE)						3						3	40		46	2
8	Taiji Nishitani (JPN)			1			2				3			40		46	19
9	Cho Ho-sung (KOR)		1		2									40		43	20
10	Jang Sun-jae (KOR)		2					5						20		27	14
11	Vadim Shaekhov (UZB)	2	3											20		25	12
12	Kwok Ho Ting (HKG)						1							20		21	11
13	Xu Gang (CHN)					2										2	18
14	Amir Mustafa Rusli (MAS)					1								20	20	1	16
15	Atul Kumar (IND)															0	6
16	Yevgeniy Sladkov (KAZ)															0	15
17	Mohammed Al-Murawwi (UAE)														20	−20	7
18	Khalil Al-Rahman (QAT)														20	−20	13
19	Huang Hsin-hua (TPE)														20	−20	17
20	Rajender Kumar Bishnoi (IND)														40	−40	8
—	Abbas Saeidi Tanha (IRI)				1									20	40	DNF	
—	Li Wei (CHN)														20	DNF	
—	Sultan Assiri (KSA)		5												40	DNF	
—	Ahmed Al-Bardiny (QAT)															DNF	
