= Cycling at the 2002 Asian Games – Men's road race =

Men's road race at the 2002 Asian Games
- Venue: Busan Road Cycle Race Stadium
- Date: 3 October 2002
- Competitors: 28 from 16 nations

Medalists
gold medal	Sergey Krushevskiy	Uzbekistan
silver medal	Alexander Vinokourov	Kazakhstan
bronze medal	Wong Kam Po	Hong Kong

The men's road race competition at the 2002 Asian Games was held on 3 October at the Road Cycle Race Stadium. The race was 169.4 km long and began with a mass start.

== Schedule ==
All times are Korea Standard Time (UTC+09:00)

Date	Time	Event
Thursday, 3 October 2002	10:00	Final

== Results ==
Legend

- DNF — Did not finish

Rank	Athlete	Time
1st place, gold medalist(s)	Sergey Krushevskiy (UZB)	4:17:59
2nd place, silver medalist(s)	Alexander Vinokourov (KAZ)	4:18:24
3rd place, bronze medalist(s)	Wong Kam Po (HKG)	4:19:17
4	Eugen Wacker (KGZ)	4:20:31
5	Rafael Nuritdinov (UZB)	4:24:13
6	Sergey Yakovlev (KAZ)	4:24:13
7	Ghader Mizbani (IRI)	4:24:19
8	Li Fuyu (CHN)	4:25:25
9	Park In-chan (KOR)	4:25:25
10	Shinri Suzuki (JPN)	4:25:42
11	Jamsrangiin Ölzii-Orshikh (MGL)	4:25:42
12	Merculio Ramos (PHI)	4:25:52
13	Tonton Susanto (INA)	4:25:52
14	Wong Ngai Ching (HKG)	4:26:44
15	Mai Công Hiếu (VIE)	4:26:47
16	Choi Soon-young (KOR)	4:26:48
17	Ahad Kazemi (IRI)	4:26:54
18	Victor Espiritu (PHI)	4:26:54
19	Fathi Al-Muslim (KSA)	4:40:01
20	Trương Quốc Thắng (VIE)	4:40:01
21	Abdulhaq Al-Eissa (KSA)	4:40:01
22	Khuyagtyn Pürevsüren (MGL)	4:40:01
—	Taj Mohammad Bahrooz (AFG)	DNF
—	Jorge Pereira (TMP)	DNF
—	Suwandra (INA)	DNF
—	Junichi Shibuya (JPN)	DNF
—	Wang Guozhang (CHN)	DNF
—	Haroon Rashid (PAK)	DNF
