= Valeriy Dmitriyev =

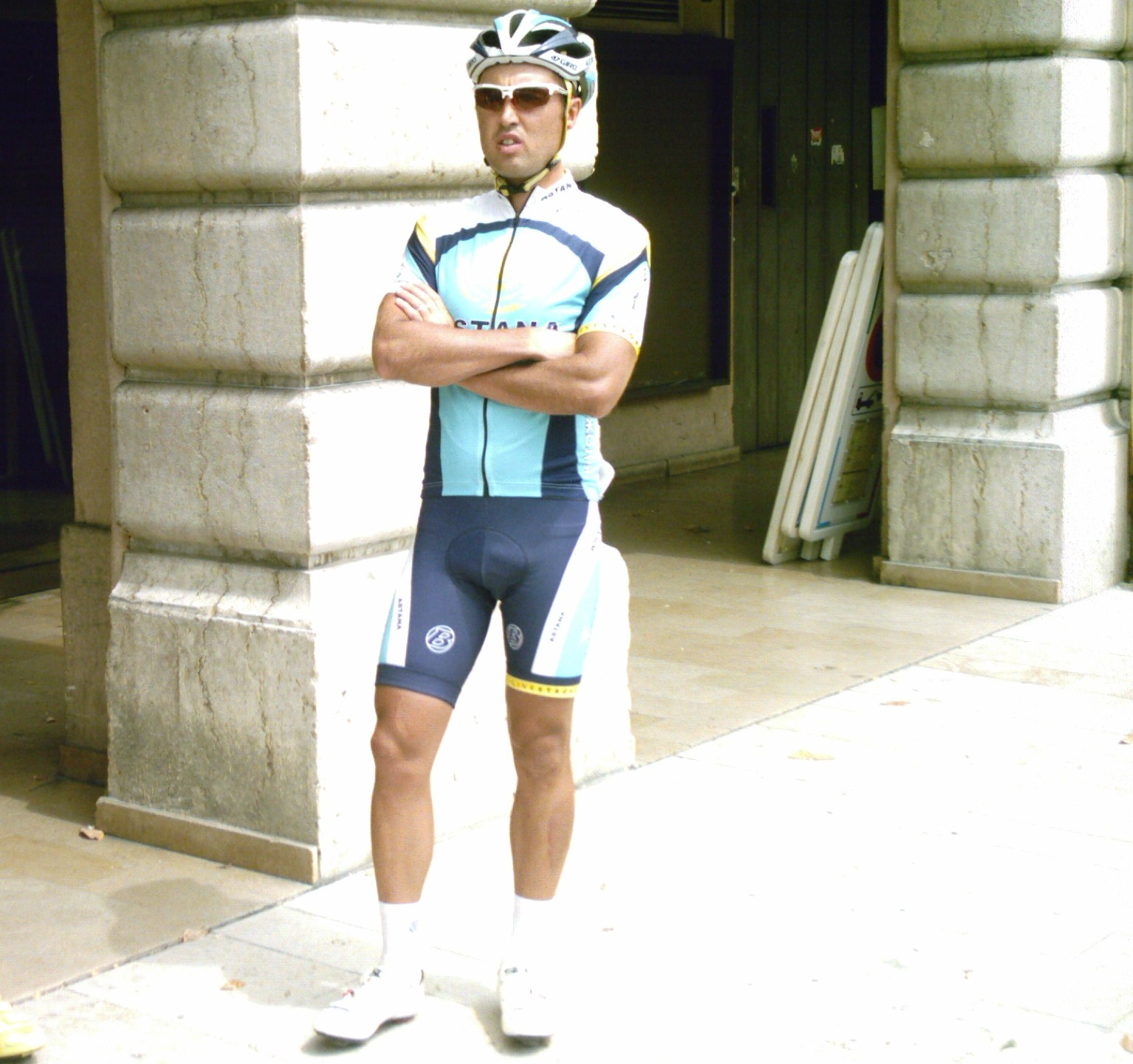
- Valeriy Dmitriyev

Personal information
- Full name: Valeriy Dmitriyev
- Born: 10 October 1984 (age 42) Almaty, Kazakhstan

Cycling career
- Sport: Cycling
- Discipline: Road
- Role: Rider

Professional teams
- 2004: Capec
- 2006: Capec
- 2008: Ulan
- 2009–2010: Astana

Valeriy Fyodorovich Dmitriyev (Russian: Валерий Фёдорович Дмитриев, born 10 October 1984) is a Kazakhstani road bicycle racer, last for Astana of the UCI ProTour.

== Major results ==
2004
1st Stage 3 Giro delle Regioni
3rd Road race, Asian Road Championship
2005
1st Overall Tour of Greece
2006
3rd Overall Tour of Egypt

1st Stage 5

2008
3rd Overall Vuelta a Navarra
