= Cycling Team Capec =

Team information
- UCI code: CAP
- Registered: Kazakhstan
- Founded: 2004
- Disbanded: 2006
- Discipline: Road
- Status: UCI Continental

Key personnel
- General manager: Yakov Klebanov
- Team managers: Vladimir Remyga; Vadim Kravchenko

Team name history
- 2004 2005–2006: Capec; Cycling Team Capec

Cycling Team Capec was a Kazakh UCI Continental cycling team that existed from 2004 until 2006.

== Final team roster ==
Rider	Date of birth
Ilya Chernyshov (KAZ)	6 February 1985 (aged 20)
Valeriy Dmitriyev (KAZ)	10 October 1984 (aged 21)
Alexsandr Dyachenko (KAZ)	17 October 1983 (aged 22)
Alexandr Dymovskikh (KAZ)	5 August 1983 (aged 22)
Dmitriy Gruzdev (KAZ)	13 March 1986 (aged 19)
Valentin Iglinskiy (KAZ)	12 May 1984 (aged 21)
Nazar Jumabekov (KAZ)	1 March 1987 (aged 18)

Rider	Date of birth
Alexandr Kozyrenko (KAZ)	23 June 1987 (aged 18)
Alexey Lyalko (KAZ)	12 January 1985 (aged 20)
Andrey Medyannikov (KAZ)	11 June 1981 (aged 24)
Andrey Mizurov (KAZ)	16 March 1973 (aged 32)
Vadim Vdovinov (KAZ)	19 October 1985 (aged 20)
Yuriy Yuda (KAZ)	13 September 1983 (aged 22)
Alexey Zaitsev (KAZ)	13 June 1986 (aged 19)

== Major wins ==
2004
Overall Tour of Greece, Assan Bazayev
2005
Overall Tour of China, Andrey Mizourov
Overall Vuelta a la Independencia Nacional, Andrey Mizourov
2006
Overall Tour d'Egypte, Ilya Chernyshov
