= Grand Prix de la Somme =

French one-day road cycling race

Race details
- Date: Mid-September (until 2013); May (from 2014)
- Region: Somme, France
- Discipline: Road
- Competition: UCI Europe Tour
- Type: One-day race

History
- First edition: 1986
- Editions: 38 (as of 2025)
- First winner: Peter Gyllinck (NOR)
- Most wins: Sergey Krushevskiy (UZB); Yauheni Hutarovich (BLR) (2 wins)
- Most recent: Romain Bréant (FRA)

The Grand Prix de la Somme (formerly the Tour de la Somme) is a single-day road bicycle race held annually during May in the Somme, France.

== List of winners ==
Year	Country	Rider	Team
1986	Denmark	Peter Gylling	
1987	Norway	Olaf Lurvik	
1988	France	Gérard Aviegne	
1989	France	Jean-François Laffillée	
1990	France	Pascal Chanteur	
1991	France	Hervé Boussard	
1992	France	Philippe Gaumont	
1993	France	Frédéric Pontier	
1994	France	Jérôme Delbove	
1995	France	Denis Dugouchet	
1996	Slovakia	Jan Valach	ASK Dukla Trenčín
1997	France	Martial Locatelli	CC Étupes-Le Doubs-Pays de Montbéliard
1998	France	Jean-Michel Thilloy	VC Saint-Quentin
1999	Belgium	Bert Roesems	Tönissteiner–Colnago
2000	Germany	Michael Rich	Gerolsteiner
2001	France	Laurent Estadieu	AG2R Prévoyance
2002	Uzbekistan	Sergey Krushevskiy	Saint-Quentin–Oktos
2003	France	Frédéric Gabriel	MBK–Oktos–Saint-Quentin
2004	Uzbekistan	Sergey Krushevskiy	Oktos–Saint-Quentin
2005	Estonia	Erki Pütsep	AG2R Prévoyance
2006	France	Romain Feillu	France (national team U23)
2007	France	Christophe Riblon	AG2R Prévoyance
2008	France	William Bonnet	Crédit Agricole
2009	Belarus	Yauheni Hutarovich	Française des Jeux
2010	Switzerland	Martin Elmiger	Ag2r–La Mondiale
2011	France	Anthony Roux	FDJ
2012	Lithuania	Evaldas Šiškevičius	La Pomme Marseille
2013	Belgium	Preben Van Hecke	Topsport Vlaanderen–Baloise
2014	Belarus	Yauheni Hutarovich	Ag2r–La Mondiale
2015	France	Quentin Jaurégui	AG2R La Mondiale
2016	Great Britain	Daniel McLay	Fortuneo–Vital Concept
2017	France	Adrien Petit	Direct Énergie
2018	No race		
2019	France	Lorrenzo Manzin	Vital Concept–B&B Hotels
2020	No race due to the COVID-19 pandemic		
2021	Great Britain	Tom Mazzone	Saint Piran
2022	Estonia	Rait Ärm	Groupama–FDJ Continental Team
2023	France	Bastien Pichon	ESEG Douai
2024	France	Corentin Devroute	SCO Dijon
2025	France	Romain Bréant	SCO Dijon
