= Sergey Krushevskiy =

Uzbekistani cyclist (born 1976)

Personal information
- Born: 19 May 1976 (age 50) Tashkent, Uzbekistan

Cycling career
- Sport: Cycling
- Current team: Retired
- Discipline: Road
- Role: Rider

Amateur teams
- 2001: Saint-Quentin–Oktos (stagiaire)
- 2005–2006: CC Cambrai

Professional team
- 2002–2004: Saint-Quentin–Oktos

Major wins
- One-day races and Classics National Road Race Championships (2002, 2003) National Time Trial Championships (2002, 2003)
Medal record
Representing Uzbekistan
Asian Cycling Championships
Gold medal – first place	2002 Busan	Road Race
Bronze medal – third place	2002 Busan	Individual Time Trial

Sergey Krushevskiy (Russian: Сергей Крушевский; born 19 May 1976) is an Uzbek former cyclist.

== Major results ==
2001
1st Stages 3 & 4 Vuelta a Navarra
2nd Trofeo Città di San Vendemiano
4th Overall Giro Ciclistico d'Italia
2002
National Road Championships

1st Road race
1st Time trial

Asian Cycling Championships

1st Road race
3rd Time trial

1st Tour de la Somme
9th Tallinn–Tartu GP
2003
National Road Championships

1st Road race
1st Time trial

4th GP de Villers-Cotterêts
2004
1st Overall Tour de la Somme
3rd Boucles de l'Aulne
2005
2nd GP de Dourges
6th Grand Prix de Beuvry-la-Forêt
