= Laurent Estadieu =

French road cyclist

Personal information
- Born: 4 August 1975 (age 51) Saint-Gaudens, Haute-Garonne, France
- Height: 1.72 m (5 ft 8 in)
- Weight: 67 kg (148 lb)

Cycling career
- Sport: Cycling
- Current team: Retired
- Discipline: Road
- Role: Rider
- Rider type: Rouleur

Amateur teams
- 1992–1994: VC Luchon
- 1995–1996: Cahors VS
- 1997–1998: GSC Blagnac
- 1997: Crédit Agricole (stagiaire)
- 1999: US Montauban 82
- 2003–2005: US Montauban 82

Professional team
- 2000–2002: AG2R Prévoyance

Laurent Estadieu (born 4 August 1975) is a French former road cyclist, who competed professionally from 2000 to 2002 with AG2R Prévoyance.

== Major results ==
1999
1st Tour du Finistère
1st Stage 4 Tour de Corrèze
2001
1st Overall Tour de la Somme
8th Tour du Doubs
2002
9th GP de Villers-Cotterêts
10th Boucles de l'Aulne
2003
1st Stage 3 Tour Nivernais Morvan
