= Cycling Golden Jersey =

Tour of Ukraine
Race details
- Region: Qatar
- Discipline: Road
- Competition: UCI Asia Tour
- Type: Stage race

History
- First edition: 2008
- Editions: 1
- Final edition: 2008
- First winner: Alexey Lyalko (KAZ)
- Most wins: No repeat winners
- Final winner: Alexey Lyalko (KAZ)

The Cycling Golden jersey was a stage road cycling race held in Qatar. Only one edition was held. It was part of UCI Asia Tour in category 2.2.

== Winners ==
Year	Country	Rider	Team
2008	Kazakhstan	Alexey Lyalko	Ulan
