= Olga Drobysheva =

Uzbekistani cyclist (born 1984)

Personal information
- Born: 21 December 1984 (age 41) Uzbekistan

Cycling career
- Sport: Cycling
- Discipline: Road cycling

Professional team
- 2013: Team Pratomagno Women

Major wins
- One day races National Time Trial Championships (2013, 2014) National Road Race Championships (2013, 2014)

Olga Drobysheva (born 21 May 1984) is a female road cyclist from Uzbekistan. She became Uzbekistani national road race and time trial champion in 2013 and also in both disciplines in 2014.

== Major results ==
2013
National Road Championships

1st Time Trial
1st Road Race

2014
National Road Championships

1st Time Trial
1st Road Race
