= Alexandr Dymovskikh =

Kazakh cyclist (born 1983)

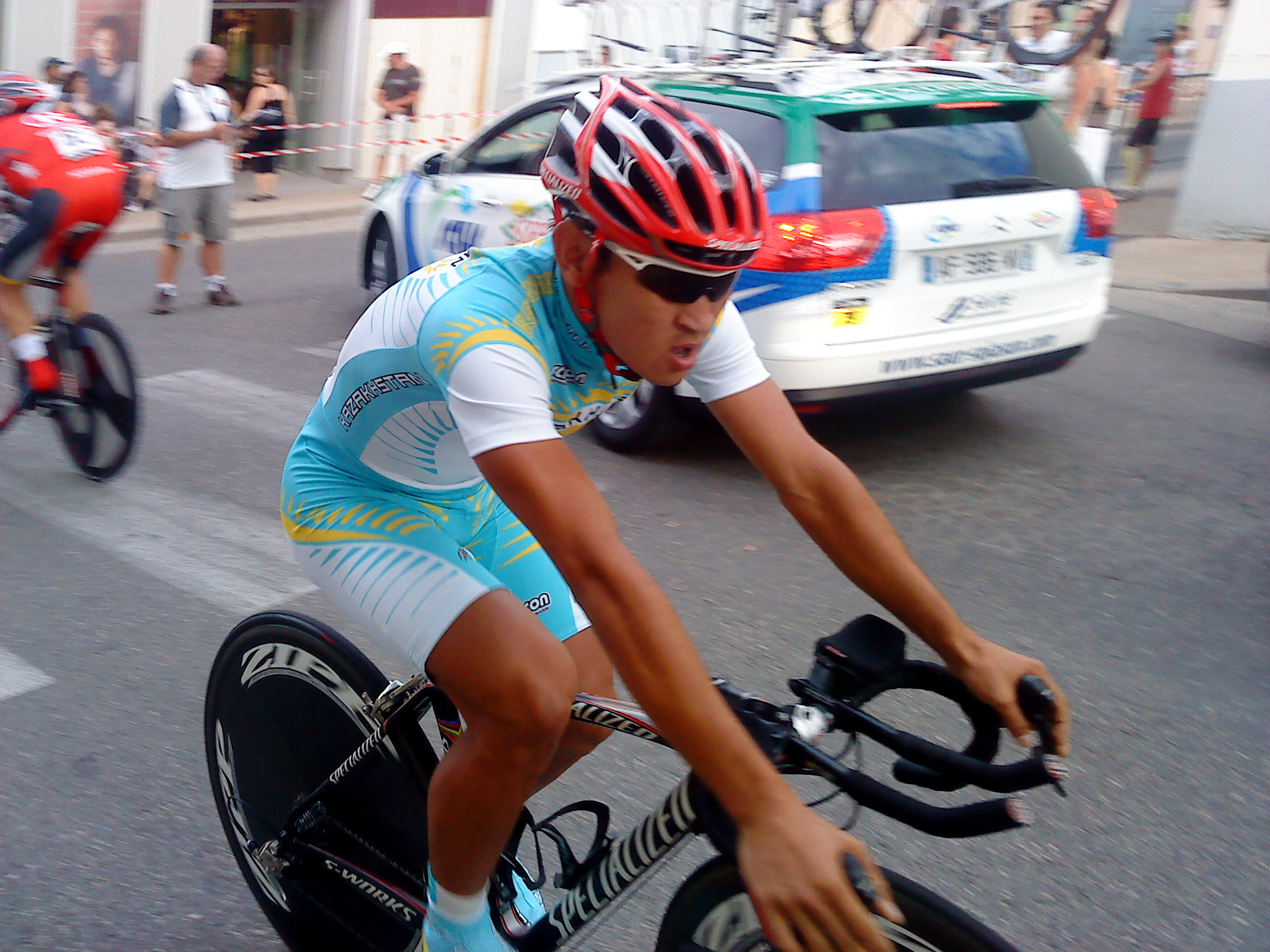

Personal information
- Born: 5 August 1983 (age 43)

Cycling career
- Sport: Cycling
- Discipline: Road
- Role: Rider

Amateur team
- 2009–2010: Brisaspor

Professional team
- 2004–2007: Capec

Alexandr Dymovskikh (Kazakh: Александр Николаевич Дымовских, born 5 August 1983) is a Kazakh cyclist.

== Major results ==
2005
2nd Overall Tour of Greece
2006
1st Team time trial, Asian Games
2009
1st Overall Tour du Maroc

1st Stage 1
