= Sergey Lagutin =

Uzbek and Russian racing cyclist

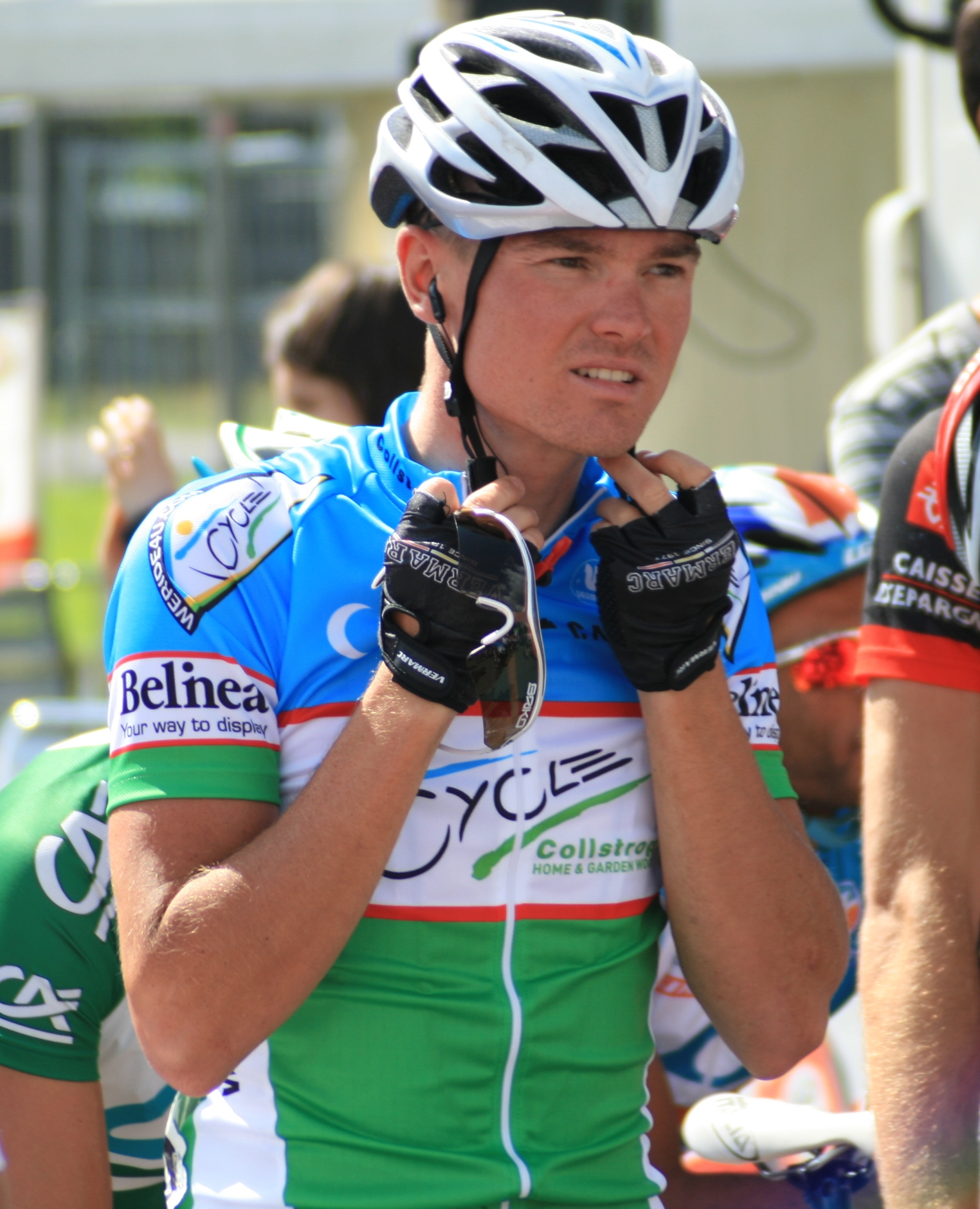
- Lagutin at the 2008 Eneco Tour

Personal information
- Full name: Sergey Lagutin
- Born: 14 January 1981 (age 45): Fergana, Uzbek SSR; (now Uzbekistan)
- Height: 1.81 m (5 ft 11 in)
- Weight: 65 kg (143 lb)

Cycling career
- Sport: Cycling
- Current team: Team Novo Nordisk Development
- Discipline: Road
- Role: Rider (retired); Directeur sportif

Amateur teams
- 2001: JFR
- 2002–2003: Palazzago–Caneva

Professional teams
- 2004–2005: Landbouwkrediet–Colnago
- 2006–2007: Navigators Insurance
- 2008: Cycle Collstrop
- 2009–2013: Vacansoleil
- 2014: RusVelo
- 2015–2016: Team Katusha
- 2017–2018: Gazprom–RusVelo

Managerial team
- 2021–: Team Novo Nordisk Development

Major wins
- Grand Tours Vuelta a España 1 individual stage (2016) Single-day races and Classics Uzbekistan National Road Race Championships (2005, 2006, 2008–2012) Uzbekistan National Time Trial Championships (2004, 2005)

Sergey Lagutin (Сергей Лагутин; born 14 January 1981) is a former professional road racing cyclist, who competed professionally between 2004 and 2018 for seven different teams, and represented both Russia and Uzbekistan in competition. He now works as a directeur sportif for UCI Continental team Team Novo Nordisk Development.

== Career ==
In 2003, Fergana-born Lagutin became the Under-23 men's road race world champion. He represented Uzbekistan in the men's road race at the 2004 Summer Olympic Games. In 2005, he captured the Uzbekistan national road race and time trial championships. In June 2006, he rode for the Navigators Insurance team and has captured the Commerce Bank Triple series championship in the US, as well as regaining his national road race title.

In November 2013, Lagutin announced that he had signed for the RusVelo team for the 2014 season, and also that he would ride under a Russian licence rather than for Uzbekistan. In September 2014, Team Katusha announced that they had signed Lagutin on a two-year deal from 2015.

Subsequently, in September 2016, Gazprom–RusVelo confirmed that Lagutin would return to the team from 2017, having agreed a two-year contract.

== Major results ==
2002
3rd Trofeo Banca Popolare di Vicenza
3rd Flèche Ardennaise
4th Road race, UCI Under-23 Road World Championships
6th Liège–Bastogne–Liège U23
10th Tour du Jura
2003
1st Road race, UCI Under-23 Road World Championships
1st Paris–Roubaix Espoirs
Uzbekistan National Road Championships (Note: Until 2013, Lagutin raced with an Uzbek licence. Thereafter, he competed for Russia.)

2nd Road race
2nd Time trial

2nd Trofej Plava Laguna Poreč II
6th Trofeo Internazionale Bastianelli
9th GP Istria 4
2004
Uzbekistan National Road Championships

1st Time trial
2nd Road race

8th Ühispanga Tartu Tänavasoít
2005
Uzbekistan National Road Championships

1st Road race
1st Time trial

1st Kampioenschap van Vlaanderen
5th Grand Prix de Wallonie
6th Overall Danmark Rundt
9th Gran Premio di Chiasso
9th Nokere Koerse
2006
Uzbekistan National Road Championships

1st Road race
2nd Time trial

1st Overall Commerce Bank Triple Crown of Cycling

2nd Reading Classic
3rd Lancaster Classic
6th Philadelphia International Championship

1st Sprints classification Tour of Utah
2nd Overall Tour de Beauce

1st Points classification
1st Stage 3

3rd Overall Cascade Cycling Classic
3rd Grote Prijs Jef Scherens
4th Paris–Brussels
5th Grand Prix d'Isbergues
9th Hel van het Mergelland
2007
1st Stage 1 Rheinland-Pfalz Rundfahrt
2nd Hel van het Mergelland
Commerce Bank Triple Crown of Cycling

2nd Lancaster Classic
4th Reading Classic

10th Rund um Köln
2008
Uzbekistan National Road Championships

1st Road race
2nd Time trial

1st Overall Tour de Korea-Japan

1st Mountains classification
1st Stage 4

4th Overall Tour of Belgium
7th Grand Prix de Wallonie
8th Overall Tour de Luxembourg
9th Overall Tour of Qinghai Lake
2009
1st Road race, Uzbekistan National Road Championships
6th Overall Route du Sud
2010
1st Road race, Uzbekistan National Road Championships
5th Overall Circuit de Lorraine
9th Grand Prix de Fourmies
9th Grand Prix d'Isbergues
10th Overall Tour de Pologne
2011
1st Road race, Uzbekistan National Road Championships
5th Classic Loire Atlantique
10th Overall Critérium International
2012
1st Road race, Uzbekistan National Road Championships
1st Grand Prix of Aargau Canton
5th Road race, Olympic Games
5th Overall Vuelta a Andalucía
2013
4th Overall Tour du Limousin
9th Roma Maxima
2014
1st Mayor Cup
2nd Overall Grand Prix of Sochi

1st Stage 1

2nd Overall Five Rings of Moscow

1st Stage 3

2nd Overall Grand Prix of Adygeya
3rd Tour of Almaty
5th Overall Tour de Luxembourg
6th Giro dell'Appennino
6th Coppa Bernocchi
7th Coppa Ugo Agostoni
8th Memorial Oleg Dyachenko
8th Giro di Toscana
2015
3rd Road race, Russian National Road Championships
3rd Overall Tour de Wallonie
4th Overall Tour of Alberta
2016
1st Stage 8 Vuelta a España

Held after Stages 8 & 13

3rd Road race, Russian National Road Championships

=== Grand Tour general classification results timeline ===
Grand Tour	2009	2010	2011	2012	2013	2014	2015	2016	2017
Giro d'Italia	—	—	90	32	—	—	72	—	157
Tour de France	—	—	—	—	83	—	—	—	—
/ Vuelta a España	104	—	15	46	—	—	—	71	—

Legend
—	Did not compete
DNF	Did not finish
