= Ruslan Karimov =

Uzbekistani cyclist (born 1986)

Personal information
- Born: 22 May 1986 (age 40) Gagarin, Uzbekistan
- Height: 1.76 m (5 ft 9 in)
- Weight: 72 kg (159 lb; 11 st 5 lb)

Cycling career
- Sport: Cycling
- Current team: Retired
- Disciplines: Road; Track
- Role: Rider

Professional teams
- 2007–2008: Uzbekistan Pro Cycling (track)
- 2012: Team Idea
- 2013: Team Velo Reality
- 2014–2018: RTS–Santic Racing Team

Major wins
- One-day races and Classics National Road Race Championships (2007, 2014, 2015, 2017) National Time Trial Championships (2010)

Ruslan Karimov (born 22 May 1986) is an Uzbek former professional cyclist.

== Major results ==
2004
Asian Junior Road Championships

4th Road race
8th Time trial

2005
2nd Road race, National Road Championships
2006
3rd Overall Tour de Korea
2007
1st Road race, National Road Championships
2010
National Road Championships

1st Time trial
2nd Road race

3rd Circuito del Porto
5th Piccolo Giro di Lombardia
10th Tour of Taihu Lake
2011
2nd Road race, National Road Championships
5th Trofeo Franco Balestra
5th Circuito del Porto
2014
1st Road race, National Road Championships
9th Road race, Asian Road Championships
2015
1st Road race, National Road Championships
2017
National Road Championships

1st Road race
2nd Time trial

2018
3rd Road race, National Road Championships
