= 7 Saber Uzbekistan Cycling Team =

Uzbekistan cycling team

Team information
- UCI code: SAB (2026); OU7 (2025); TCM (2022–2024)
- Registered: Uzbekistan
- Founded: 2022
- Discipline: Road
- Status: UCI Continental Team (2022–)

Key personnel
- General manager: Ruslan Useynov

Team name history
2022–2024	Tashkent City Professional Cycling Team
2025	OU7 Cycling Team
2026	7 Saber Uzbekistan Cycling Team

7 Saber Uzbekistan Cycling Team is an Uzbekistan Men's road bicycle racing team, established in 2022, which participates in elite Men's races.

== Team roster ==
As of 23 June 2026

Rider	Date of birth
Behzod Bahodirov (UZB)	16 May 2006 (age 20)
Farrukh Bobosherov (UZB)	16 March 2005 (age 21)
Dmitriy Bocharov (UZB)	6 June 2002 (age 24)
Sanjarbek Ergashev (UZB)	30 November 2004 (age 21)
Samandar Janikulov (UZB)	27 November 2004 (age 21)

Rider	Date of birth
Avazbek Kamolov (UZB)	4 January 2005 (age 21)
Muradjan Khalmuratov (UZB)	11 June 1982 (age 44)
Abdurahmon Nematov (UZB)	1 February 2005 (age 21)
Sayfiev Samariddin (UZB)	31 March 2005 (age 21)
Diyor Takhirov (UZB)	25 December 2005 (age 20)

== Major wins ==
No major victories

== National, continental, and world champions ==
2022
Uzbekistan Road Race, Akramjon Sunnatov
Uzbekistan Time Trial, Aleksey Fomovskiy
2024
Uzbekistan Road Race, Dmitriy Bocharov
Uzbekistan Time Trial, Nikita Tsvetkov
Uzbekistan Under-23 Road Race, Dmitriy Bocharov
Uzbekistan Under-23 Time Trial, Farrukh Bobosherov
2025
Uzbekistan Road Race, Diyor Takhirov
Uzbekistan Time Trial, Nikita Tsvetkov
Uzbekistan Under-23 Road Race, Nikita Tsvetkov
Uzbekistan Under-23 Time Trial, Nikita Tsvetkov
2026
Uzbekistan Under-23 Time Trial, Farrukh Bobosherov
