= Nafosat Kozieva =

Uzbekistani cyclist (born 1998)

- Kozieva, prior to the women's road race at the 2023 UCI Road World Championships

Personal information
- Born: 31 July 1998 (age 28) Uzbekistan

Cycling career
- Sport: Cycling
- Current team: Odl Team-Kiwi Atlântico-Craega
- Disciplines: Road; Track
- Role: Rider

Amateur team
- 2026–: Odl Team-Kiwi Atlântico-Craega

Professional teams
- 2022–2024: Tashkent City Women Professional Cycling Team
- 2025: Sahand Pump Crown Tabriz
Medal record
Representing Uzbekistan
Women's track cycling
Asian Cycling Championships
| Gold medal – first place | 2026 Tagaytay | Points |
| Silver medal – second place | 2024 New Delhi | Madison |
| Bronze medal – third place | 2022 New Delhi | Madison |
| Bronze medal – third place | 2023 Nilai | Madison |
| Bronze medal – third place | 2025 Nilai | Madison |
| Bronze medal – third place | 2025 Nilai | Omnium |
| Bronze medal – third place | 2025 Nilai | Points |

Nafosat Kozieva (born 31 July 1998) is an Uzbekistani professional racing cyclist, who rides for the Odl Team-Kiwi Atlântico-Craega.

== Career ==
In 2024 at the “Life’s an Omnium Madison" contest held in Switzerland she won the points race. Kozieva achieved three bronze medals at the 2025 Asian Track Cycling Championships. Tashkent City Women Professional Cycling Team led the continental rankings in 2023 and subsequently earned wildcards to all the UCI Women's World Tour in 2024. Kozieva started both the Giro d'Italia Women and the Tour de France Femmes, she did not complete either race.

== Major results ==
=== Road ===
2017
National Championships

4th Time trial
5th Road race

2022
National Championships

3rd Road race
4th Time trial

8th Asian Road Cycling Championships Road race
8th Trofeo Rosa Green Bike
2023
National Championships

4th Road race
5th Time trial

2nd San Gabriel Gold Race - Trofeo Renzo Tonon
5th Grand Prix Kaisareia
6th Grand Prix Apollon Temple
10th UMAG Classic Ladies
2024
4th Brugge-Dudzele
2025
6th Overall BIWASE Tour of Vietnam
2026
2nd Asian Road Cycling Championships Road race

=== Track ===
2021
National champs

2nd Madison
2nd Points race

2022
Asian Track Cycling Championships

3rd Madison (with Yanina Kuskova)

2023
Asian Track Cycling Championships

3rd Madison (with Olga Zabelinskaya)
4th Team pursuit
6th Elimination race

1st 6 Sere Internazionale Città di Pordenone CL1 Points race
2nd Troféu Internacional de Pista Madison CL2 (with Margarita Misyurina)
Silk Road Namangan I CL2

1st Team pursuit
1st Elimination race
1st Madison (with Olga Zabelinskaya)

Silk Road Namangan II CL2

1st Team pursuit
2nd Madison

2024
1st Life's an Omnium Madison - Points race
2nd Asian Track Cycling Championships Madison (with Olga Zabelinskaya)
2025
Asian Track Cycling Championships

3rd Omnium
3rd Points race
3rd Madison (with Asal Rizaeva)

2026
1st Asian Track Cycling Championships Points race
