= Golan (cycling race) =

Race details
- Date: June
- Region: Syria
- Discipline: Road
- Competition: UCI Asia Tour
- Type: One-day race

History
- First edition: 2011
- Editions: 1 (as of 2011)
- Final edition: 2011

Golan was an elite series of men's and women's professional one-day road bicycle races held in Syria. The event consisted of two one-day races (Golan I and Golan II). Each of the events were rated by the UCI as a 1.2 races.

== Golan I Past winners ==
=== Men ===
Year	Country	Rider	Team
2011	Uzbekistan	Vladimir Tuychiev	

=== Women ===
Year	Country	Rider	Team
2011	Ukraine	Ivanna Borovychenko	

== Golan II Past winners ==
=== Men ===
Year	Country	Rider	Team
2011	Syria	Fadi Khan Shekhoni	

=== Women ===
Year	Country	Rider	Team
2011	Ukraine	Ivanna Borovychenko	
