= Ilya Chernyshov =

Kazakh cyclist (born 1985)

Personal information
- Born: 6 September 1985 (age 41)

Cycling career
- Sport: Cycling
- Discipline: Road
- Role: Rider

Professional teams
- 2005–2007: Capec
- 2008: Ulan

Ilya Chernyshov (born 6 September 1985) is a Kazakh cyclist. He competed in the men's Madison at the 2004 Summer Olympics.

== Palmares ==
2006
1st Asian Games Team Time Trial

1st Overall Tour d'Egypte
1st Stage 2

2007
2nd Overall Mainfranken Tour
2008
1st Stage 1 Cycling Golden Jersey (TTT)
