= Ekaterina Knebeleva =

Uzbekistani cyclist (born 1996)

Personal information
- Full name: Ekaterina Knebeleva
- Born: 13 December 1996 (age 29) Uzbekistan

Cycling career
- Sport: Cycling
- Current team: Retired
- Discipline: Road
- Role: Rider

Professional teams
- 2018: Alasayl Cycling Team
- 2019: Cogeas–Mettler–Look

Major wins
- One-day races and Classics National Road Race Championships (2018)
Medal record
Women's track cycling
Representing Uzbekistan
Asian Championships
Bronze medal – third place	2019 Jakarta	Madison

Ekaterina Knebeleva (born 13 December 1996) is an Uzbekistani professional racing cyclist, who last rode for the UCI Women's Team Cogeas–Mettler–Look during the 2019 women's road cycling season. Knebeleva set the national track records for 250 m time trial (standing start) and 500 m time trial at the 2019 Asian Track Cycling Championships.

== Career ==
Knebeleva was selected to represent Uzbekistan at the 2019 Asian Track Cycling Championships. At the event she achieved third place in the Madison, teamed up with Olga Zabelinskaya, giving Knebeleva her first Bronze medal.

== Major results ==
=== Road ===
2013
National Road Championships

2nd Time trial
6th Road race

2017
National Road Championships

2nd Time trial

2018
National Road Championships

1st Road race
2nd Time trial

2019
National Road Championships

3rd Road race
3rd Time trial

=== Track ===
2019
3rd Madison Asian Track Cycling Championships
