= Alexey Lyalko =

Kazakhstani cyclist (born 1985)

Personal information
- Born: 12 January 1985 (age 41)

Cycling career
- Sport: Cycling
- Disciplines: Road; Track
- Role: Rider

Professional teams
- 2006: Capec
- 2008: Ulan

Alexey Lyalko (Алексей Михайлович Лялько, born 12 January 1985) is a Kazakhstani former road track cyclist. He competed in the team pursuit event at the 2012 UCI Track Cycling World Championships.

== Major results ==
2005
5th Grand Prix of Moscow
2008
1st Overall Cycling Golden Jersey
5th International Grand Prix Losail
8th International Grand Prix Doha
2011
1st Stage 1 Tour of Azerbaijan (Iran)
2012
10th Overall Tour of East Java
