= Rafael Nuritdinov =

Uzbekistani cyclist (born 1977)

Personal information
- Born: 12 June 1977 (age 49) Ferghana, Uzbekistan

Cycling career
- Sport: Cycling
- Current team: Retired
- Role: Rider

Professional teams
- 2002: Team Colpack–Astro
- 2003–2005: De Nardi–Colpack

Rafael Nuritdinov (born 12 June 1977 in Fergana) is an Uzbek former road racing cyclist.

== Major results ==
2001
1st Gran Premio Industria e Commercio Artigianato Carnaghese
5th Giro d'Oro
2002
7th Trofeo Città di Castelfidardo
10th Overall Hessen Rundfahrt
2004
National Road Championships

1st Road race
2nd Time trial
