= Yanina Kuskova =

Uzbek cyclist (born 2001)

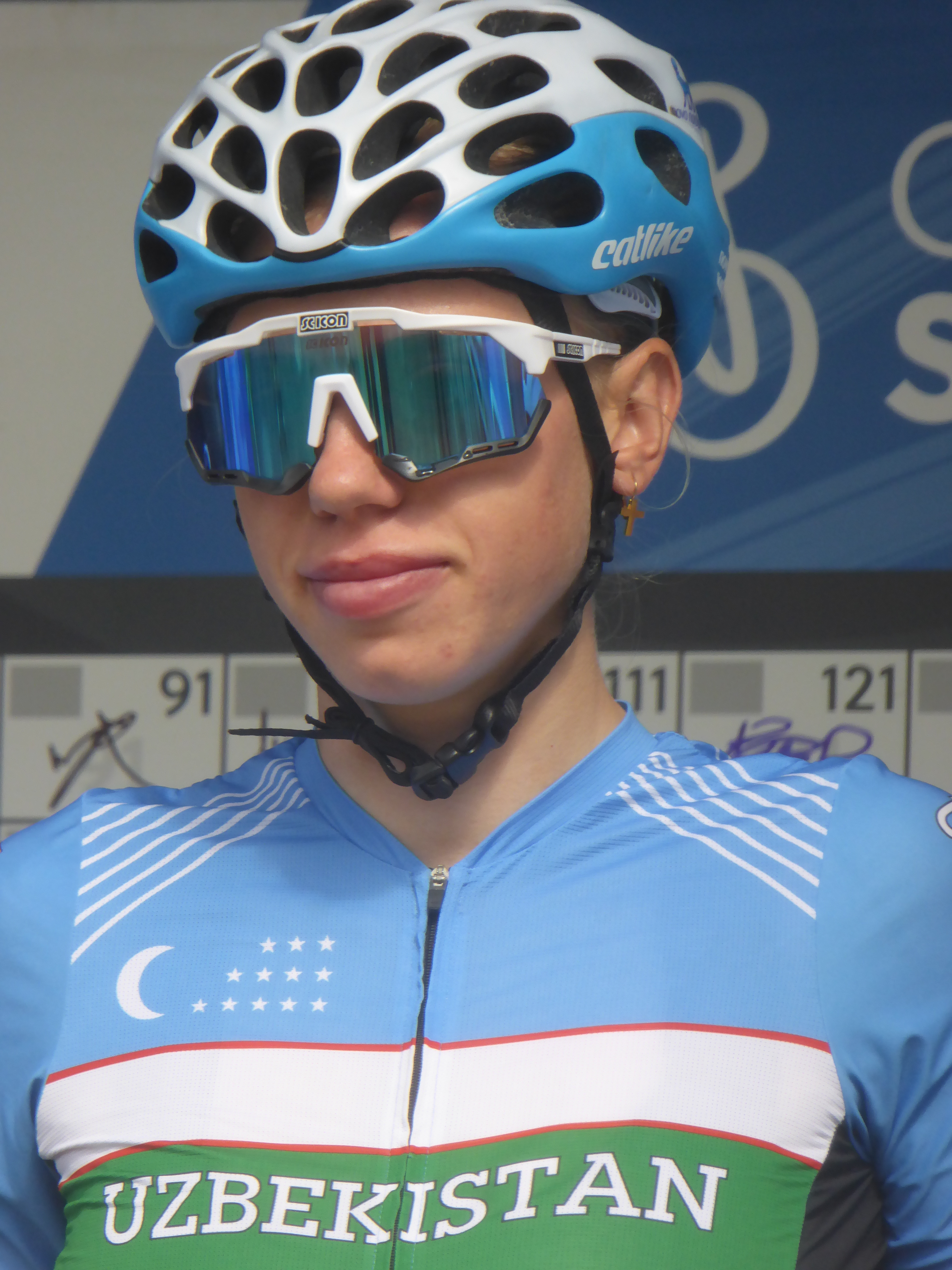
- Kuskova prior to the women's road race at the 2023 UCI Road World Championships

Personal information
- Full name: Yanina Kuskova
- Born: 11 December 2001 (age 24) Tashkent, Uzbekistan
- Height: 1.80 m (5 ft 11 in)

Cycling career
- Sport: Cycling
- Current team: Uzbekistan
- Disciplines: Road; Track
- Role: Rider

Professional teams
- 2022–2024: Tashkent City Women Professional Cycling Team
- 2025–2026: Laboral Kutxa–Fundación Euskadi

Major wins
- One-day races and Classics National Time Trial Championships (2020, 2021, 2025) National Road Race Championships (2020, 2021, 2023, 2024)
Medal record
Representing Uzbekistan
Women's road cycling
Asian Championships
Gold medal – first place	2022 Dushanbe	Team time trial
Gold medal – first place	2022 Dushanbe	Under-23 time trial
Gold medal – first place	2025 Phitsanulok	Time trial
Silver medal – second place	2024 Almaty	Time trial
Silver medal – second place	2024 Almaty	Mixed team relay
Women's track cycling
Asian Championships
Bronze medal – third place	2022 New Delhi	Individual pursuit
Bronze medal – third place	2022 New Delhi	Points race
Bronze medal – third place	2022 New Delhi	Madison

Yanina Kuskova (born 11 December 2001) is an Uzbek professional racing cyclist, who currently rides for the Uzbekistan national team. She has won the Uzbekistan National Time Trial Championships twice (2020 and 2021) and the Uzbekistan National Road Race Championships four times (2020, 2021, 2023 and 2024).

== Career ==
Kuskova won her first national titles in 2020, winning both the Uzbekistan National Time Trial Championship and the Uzbekistan National Road Race Championship.

Kuskova was on a team camp training when they rode the Germenica Grand Prix Road Race WE as part of the national team in 2021. Kuskova finished in tenth place as the best young rider. In March 2022 Kuskova took her first international win at the Grand Prix Mediterranean WE. During the 2022 Asian Road Cycling Championships Kuskova rode the Under-23 time trial with a time of 34:08 beating the second place by 2:32 and securing a gold medal. Uzbekistan earned three medals at the 2022 Asian Track Cycling Championships all of them earned by Kuskova. After the Asian Cycling Championships Kuskova did not start a UCI road event until the Ladies Tour of Estonia in late May. The race ended with a solo winner and a bunch sprint for second to eleventh, with Kuskova finishing in eleventh 1:04 down on the winner.

In 2024, Kuskova took part in the 2024 Tour de France Femmes with the Tashkent City Women Professional Cycling Team, finishing 47th overall. She took won the road race at the Uzbek national championships for the fourth time.

In November 2024, Kuskova signed with Laboral Kutxa–Fundación Euskadi for the 2025 season. In March 2026, Kuskova announced that she had chosen to leave Laboral Kutxa–Fundación Euskadi to allow her to compete more regularly for the Uzbekistan national team.

== Major results ==
=== Road ===
2019
1st National Junior Time trial
2020
National Road Championships

1st Time trial
1st Road race

2021
National Road Championships

1st Time trial
1st Road race

2nd Grand Prix Velo Alanya WE
8th Grand Prix Gündoğmuş WE
10th Germenica Grand Prix Road Race WE
2022
Asian Road Cycling Championships

1st Team time trial
1st Under-23 Individual time trial
6th Elite Road race

National Road Championships

4th Road race
5th Time trial

1st Grand Prix Mediterrennean WE
2nd Time trial Islamic Solidarity Games
3rd Grand Prix Gazipaşa WE
4th Overall Princess Anna Vasa Tour
2023
Asian Road Cycling Championships

1st Under-23 Individual Time Trial
2nd Team time trial
10th Road Race

National Road Championships

1st Road race
2nd Time trial

1st Expo Kriteryum
1st Poreč Trophy LADIES
1st Tour of Bostonliq I Ladies
1st Tour of Bostonliq II Ladies
2nd Overall Trofeo Ponente in Rosa

1st Young riders classification

2nd The Tour Oqtosh - Chorvoq - Mountain Ladies I (ITT)
4th Aphrodite Cycling Race ITT
4th Respect Ladies Race Slovakia
5th Aphrodite Cycling Race - Women for future
7th The Tour Oqtosh - Chorvoq - Mountain Ladies II
8th Belgrade GP Woman Tour
9th Aphrodite Cycling Race - RR
2024
9th Overall Tour of Thailand
2025
1st Time trial, Asian Road Championships
National Road Championships

1st Time trial
2nd Road race

3rd Overall Vuelta a El Salvador
7th Grand Prix El Salvador
2026
4th Grand Prix San Salvador
6th Grand Prix de Oriente
10th Overall Vuelta a El Salvador

=== Track ===
2021
1st National Omnium Championship
2022
Islamic Solidarity Games

2nd Individual pursuit
2nd Points race

Asian Track Cycling Championships

3rd Individual pursuit
3rd Points race
3rd Madison (with Nafosat Kozieva)
