= Al'Asayl Cycling Team =

Team information
- UCI code: ACT
- Registered: United Arab Emirates
- Founded: 2018
- Disbanded: 2018
- Discipline: Road
- Status: UCI Women's Team

Key personnel
- Team manager: Hamid Khamseh

Team name history
- 2018: Al'Asayl Cycling Team

Al'Asayl Cycling Team (UCI team code: ACT) was a professional women's cycling team based in the United Arab Emirates, which competes in elite road bicycle racing events such as the UCI Women's World Tour.

== Roster ==
As of 2018, the team roster included:

Rider	Date of birth
Alyazia Al Nahyan (UAE)	1 January 1970 (age 56)
Nadin Almaskari (UAE)	1 January 1970 (age 56)
Shouq Alnowais (UAE)	1 January 1970 (age 56)
Renata Baymetova (UZB)	9 August 1998 (age 28)
Mandana Dehghan (IRN)	26 February 1991 (age 35)

Rider	Date of birth
Ekaterina Knebeleva (UZB)	13 December 1996 (age 29)
Grace Phang (MAS)	13 September 1985 (age 40)
Roisin Thomas (IRE)	17 April 1989 (age 37)
Ebtissam Zayed (EGY)	25 September 1996 (age 29)

== Continental and national championships ==
2018
African Track (Individual Pursuit), Ebtissam Zayed
African Track (Keirin), Ebtissam Zayed
African Track (Team Pursuit), Ebtissam Zayed
African Track (Team Sprint), Ebtissam Zayed
African Track (Points race), Ebtissam Zayed
African Track (Scratch race), Ebtissam Zayed
African Track (Individual Sprint), Ebtissam Zayed
Uzbekistan Track (Omnium), Renata Baymetova
Uzbekistan Road Race, Ekaterina Knebeleva
Uzbekistan Time Trial, Renata Baymetova
