= Renata Baymetova =

Uzbekistani cyclist (born 1998)

Personal information
- Full name: Renata Baymetova
- Born: 9 August 1998 (age 28)

Cycling career
- Sport: Cycling
- Discipline: Road
- Role: Rider

Professional teams
- 2018: Alasayl Cycling Team
- 2019: Cogeas–Mettler–Look

Major wins
- One-day races and Classics National Time Trial Championships (2017, 2018)

Renata Baymetova (born 9 August 1998) is an Uzbekistani professional racing cyclist, who last rode for the UCI Women's Team Cogeas–Mettler–Look during the 2019 women's road cycling season.

== Major results ==
2017
National Road Championships

1st Time trial
4th Road race

2018
National Road Championships

1st Time trial
3rd Road race

2019
National Road Championships

2nd Time trial
2nd Road race

2020
National Road Championships

2nd Time trial
3rd Road race
