= Dmitriy Bocharov (cyclist) =

Uzbekistani racing cyclist (born 2002)

Personal information
- Born: 6 June 2002 (age 24) Fergana, Uzbekistan

Cycling career
- Sport: Cycling
- Current team: 7 Saber Uzbekistan Cycling Team
- Disciplines: Road; Track
- Role: Rider

Professional teams
- 2022: Tashkent City Professional Cycling Team
- 2023: Samarkand Professional Cycling Team
- 2024–: Tashkent City Professional Cycling Team

Major wins
- One day races and Classics National Road Race Championships (2023, 2024) National Time Trial Championships (2023)
Medal record
Representing Uzbekistan
Men's road cycling
Asian Championships
Gold medal – first place	2025 Nilai	Scratch
Silver medal – second place	2023 Rayong	Mixed team relay

Dmitriy Aleksandrovich Bocharov (Uzbek: Дмитрий Бочаров; born 6 June 2002) is an Uzbekistani road bicycle racer, who currently rides for UCI Continental team 7 Saber Uzbekistan Cycling Team. In July 2024, was selected to compete in the road race at the 2024 Summer Olympics. However, he did not compete, and was instead replaced by Nikita Tsvetkov.

== Major results ==
2020
National Junior Road Championships

2nd Time trial
3rd Road race

2022
3rd Time trial, National Road Championships
5th Under-23 road race, Asian Road Championships
2023
National Road Championships

1st Road race
3rd Time trial

National Under-23 Road Championships

1st Road race
1st Time trial

100th Anniversary Tour of The Republic

1st Mountains classification
1st Stage 2

Asian Road Championships

2nd Mixed team relay
4th Under-23 road race

3rd Overall Tour of Van

1st Mountains classification
1st Stage 2

9th Grand Prix Kaisareia
2024
National Road Championships

1st Road race
2nd Time trial

National Under-23 Road Championships

1st Road race
3rd Time trial

5th Overall Tour of Bostonliq
