= Ulan (cycling team) =

Team information
- UCI code: ULN
- Registered: Kazakhstan
- Founded: 2008
- Disbanded: 2008
- Discipline: Road
- Status: UCI Continental
- Bicycles: Bottecchia

Key personnel
- General manager: Algirdas Vaitkus
- Team manager: Arturas Trumpauskas

Ulan was a Kazakh UCI Continental cycling team. It competed only for the 2008 season.

== 2008 roster ==
Rider	Date of birth
Gediminas Bagdonas (LIT)	26 December 1985 (aged 22)
Linas Balčiūnas (LIT)	14 February 1978 (aged 29)
Ilya Chernyshov (KAZ)	6 February 1985 (aged 22)
Valeriy Dmitriyev (KAZ)	10 October 1984 (aged 23)
Alexsandr Dyachenko (KAZ)	17 October 1983 (aged 24)
Dmitriy Gruzdev (KAZ)	13 March 1986 (aged 21)
Valentin Iglinskiy (KAZ)	12 May 1984 (aged 23)
Nazar Jumabekov (KAZ)	1 March 1987 (aged 20)
Egidijus Juodvalkis (LIT)	8 April 1988 (aged 19)
Alexey Kolessov (KAZ)	27 September 1984 (aged 23)

Rider	Date of birth
Simas Kondrotas (LIT)	1 February 1985 (aged 22)
Aidis Kruopis (LIT)	26 October 1986 (aged 21)
Alexey Lyalko (KAZ)	12 January 1985 (aged 22)
Algirdas Mockus (LIT)	20 October 1986 (aged 21)
Ramūnas Navardauskas (LIT)	30 January 1988 (aged 19)
Bolat Raimbekov (KAZ)	25 December 1986 (aged 21)
Sergey Renev (KAZ)	3 January 1985 (aged 22)
Alexandr Shushemoin (KAZ)	26 February 1987 (aged 20)
Ruslan Tleubayev (KAZ)	7 March 1987 (aged 20)

== Major wins ==
2008
Stage 2 Tour du Loir-et-Cher, Valentin Iglinskiy
Stage 4 Five Rings of Moscow, Simas Kondrotas
Stages 3 & 6 Vuelta a Navarra, Valentin Iglinskiy
Stage 4 Dookoła Mazowsza, Linas Balčiūnas
