= Muradjan Khalmuratov =

Uzbekistani racing cyclist (born 1982)

Muradjan Halmuratov
Personal information
- Full name: Muradjan Halmuratov
- Born: 11 June 1982 (age 44) Khwarazm, Uzbek SSR (now Uzbekistan)
- Height: 1.85 m (6 ft 1 in)
- Weight: 68 kg (150 lb)

Cycling career
- Sport: Cycling
- Current team: 7 Saber Uzbekistan Cycling Team
- Disciplines: Road; Track
- Role: Rider

Amateur teams
- 2003: Ghia Distribuzioni–Duferco
- 2004: Fidibc.com
- 2005: Lucchini–Delio Gallina
- 2006: Gallina–Lucchini

Professional teams
- 2007: ?
- 2008: Centri della Calzatura–Partizan
- 2009–2012: Uzbekistan Suren Team
- 2012: China 361° Cycling Team
- 2013: CCN
- 2013: RTS Racing Team
- 2014: Terengganu Cycling Team
- 2015–2016: Beijing Innova Cycling Team
- 2018: RTS Racing Team
- 2021: Sweet Nice Continental Cycling Team
- 2022–: Tashkent City Professional Cycling Team

Major wins
- Stage races Tour of China (2011) One day races National Time Trial Championships (2011–2021) National Road Race Championships (2013, 2019, 2020) Asian Time Trial Championships (2013) Asian Road Race Championships (2013)
Medal record
Representing Uzbekistan
Men's road cycling
Asian Games
Silver medal – second place	2018 Jakarta-Palembang	Time trial
Asian Championships
Gold medal – first place	2013 New Delhi	Road race
Gold medal – first place	2013 New Delhi	Time trial
Silver medal – second place	2011 Nakhon Ratchasima	Road race
Bronze medal – third place	2022 Dushanbe	Road race
Men's track cycling
Asian Championships
Bronze medal – third place	2019 Jakarta	Points race

Muradjan Khalmuratov (born 11 June 1982) is an Uzbekistani road bicycle racer. He competed at the 2012 Summer Olympics in the Men's road race, but failed to finish. Khalmuratov has won a record number of 11 Uzbekistan National Time Trial Championships.

== Major results ==
2004
6th Overall Tour de Korea
9th Time trial, Asian Road Championships
2006
7th Trofeo Franco Balestra
9th Trofeo Alcide Degasperi
2007
9th Time trial, UCI B World Championships
2011
National Road Championships

1st Time trial
5th Road race

1st Overall Tour of China
Asian Road Championships

2nd Road race
5th Time trial

7th Overall Jelajah Malaysia
2012
National Road Championships

1st Time trial
4th Road race

2nd Overall Princess Maha Chakri Sirindhon's Cup Tour of Thailand

1st Stage 1

Asian Road Championships

4th Time trial
6th Road race

5th Overall Tour de Brunei
5th Overall Tour of Fuzhou
2013
Asian Road Championships

1st Time trial
1st Road race

National Road Championships

1st Time trial
1st Road race

7th Overall Tour of Iran
2014
1st Time trial, National Road Championships
7th Time trial, Asian Road Championships
9th Overall Tour of Thailand
2015
National Road Championships

1st Time trial
4th Road race

2016
National Road Championships

1st Time trial
2nd Road race

2017
National Road Championships

1st Time trial
2nd Road race

Asian Road Championships

5th Time trial
10th Road race

2018
1st Time trial, National Road Championships
2nd Time trial, Asian Games
2019
National Road Championships

1st Time trial
1st Road race

Asian Road Championships

9th Road race
10th Time trial

2020
National Road Championships

1st Time trial
1st Road race

2021
1st Time trial, National Road Championships
4th Grand Prix Alanya
6th Grand Prix Velo Alanya
7th Grand Prix Gündoğmuş
2022
3rd Time trial, Asian Road Championships
6th Grand Prix Kapuzbaşı
7th Grand Prix Velo Manavgat
9th Grand Prix Mediterranean
10th Grand Prix Yahyalı
2023
National Road Championships

1st Road race
2nd Time trial

4th Tour of Bostonliq I
5th The Tour Oqtosh - Chorvoq - Mountain II II
7th The Tour Oqtosh - Chorvoq - Mountain II I
8th Tour of Bostonliq II
