= Uzbekistan National Road Race Championships =

National road cycling championship in Uzbekistan

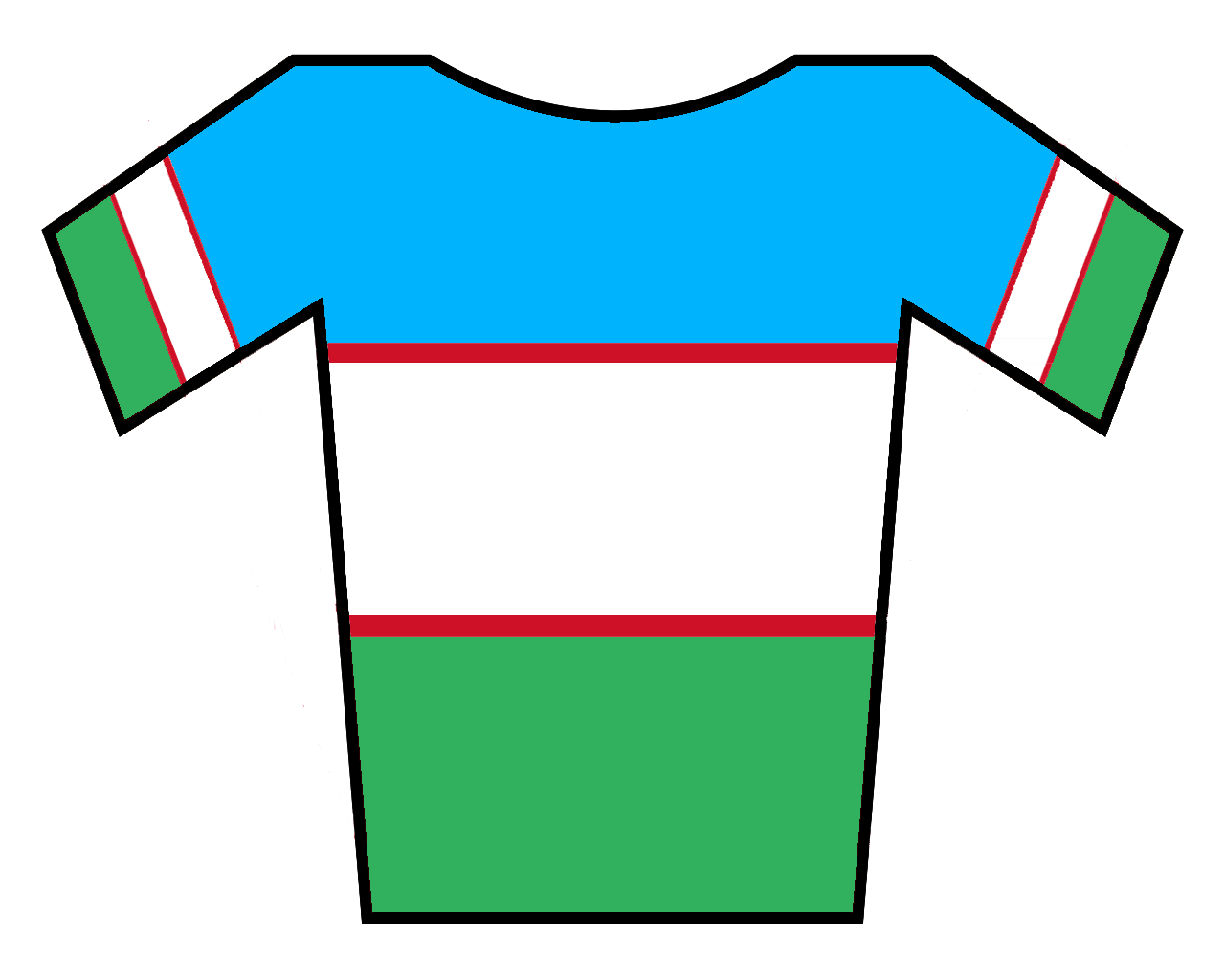
The champion's jersey

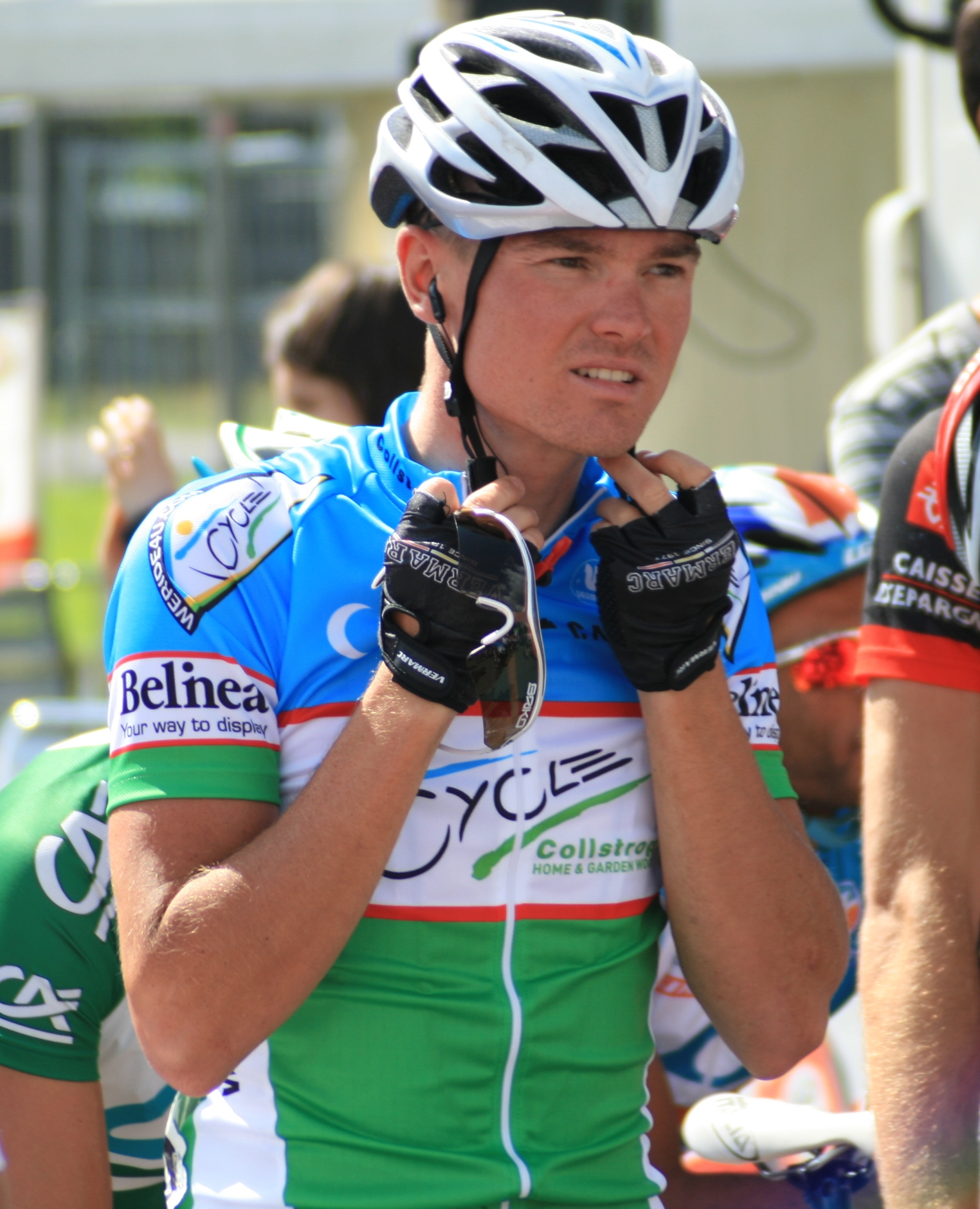
Sergey Lagutin wearing the champion jersey.

The Uzbekistan National Road Race Championship is a road bicycle race that takes place inside the Uzbekistan National Cycling Championship, and decides the best cyclist in this type of race. The first edition took place in 1998, and was won by Sergei Arkov. The current champions are Akramjon Sunnatov and Shaknoza Abdullaeva.

== Multiple winners ==
Men

Wins	Name	Years
7	Sergey Lagutin	2005, 2006, 2008, 2009, 2010, 2011, 2012
4	Ruslan Karimov	2007, 2014, 2015, 2017
3	Muradjan Khalmuratov	2013, 2019, 2020
2	Ulugbek Salamov	1999, 2000
2	Sergey Krushevskiy	2002, 2003
2	Akramjon Sunnatov	2018, 2022
2	Dmitriy Bocharov	2023, 2024

Women

Wins	Name	Years
2	Olga Drobysheva	2013, 2014
2	Yanina Kuskova	2020, 2021

== Men ==
Uzbekistan National Road Race Championships – Men's elite race
Race details
- Region: Uzbekistan
- Discipline: Road bicycle racing
- Type: One-day

History
- First edition: 1998
- First winner: Sergei Arkov
- Most wins: Sergey Lagutin (7 wins)
- Most recent: Dmitriy Bocharov

Year	Gold	Silver	Bronze
1998	Sergei Arkov	Igor Djuraev	Enver Seytmemetov
1999	Ulugbek Salamov	Damir Iratov	Sergey Arkov
2000	Ulugbek Salamov	Kahraman Mominov	Alexandr Shmidt
2001	Yuriy Plyukhin	Artem Shlindov	Kahraman Mominov
2002	Sergey Krushevskiy	Vladimir Tuychiev	Artem Shlindov
2003	Sergey Krushevskiy	Sergey Lagutin	Yuriy Plyukhin
2004	Rafael Nuritdinov	Sergey Lagutin	Aleksander Lagutin
2005	Sergey Lagutin	Ruslan Karimov	Konstantin Kalinin
2006	Sergey Lagutin	Yusuf Abrekov	Vladimir Tuychiev
2007	Ruslan Karimov	Muradjan Khalmuratov	Vladimir Tuychiev
2008	Sergey Lagutin	Yriy Ivoljatov	Eldar Mukmenov
2009	Sergey Lagutin	Vladimir Tuychiev	Yusuf Abrekov
2010	Sergey Lagutin	Ruslan Karimov	Yusuf Abrekov
2011	Sergey Lagutin	Ruslan Karimov	Vadim Shaekhov
2012	Sergey Lagutin	Konstantin Volik	Vadim Shaekhov
2013	Muradjan Khalmuratov	Yusup Abrekov	Abdullojon Akparov
2014	Ruslan Karimov	Vadim Shaekhov	Yusup Abrekov
2015	Ruslan Karimov	Abdullojon Akparov	Yusup Abrekov
2016	Sergey Medvedev	Muradjan Khalmuratov	Nikita Abramov
2017	Ruslan Karimov	Muradjan Khalmuratov	Andrey Izmaylov
2018	Akramjon Sunnatov	Dilmurdjon Siddikov	Ruslan Karimov
2019	Muradjan Khalmuratov	Dilmurdjon Siddikov	Sergey Medvedev
2020	Muradjan Khalmuratov	Nikita Stenkovoy	Behzodek Rakhimbaev
2021	Danil Evdokimov	Behzodek Rakhimbaev	Akramjon Sunnatov
2022	Akramjon Sunnatov	Behzodek Rakhimbaev	Ulugbek Saidov
2023	Dmitriy Bocharov	Edem Eminov	Danil Evdokimov
2024	Dmitriy Bocharov	Sanjarbek Ergashev	Nikita Tsvetkov

== Women ==
Uzbekistan National Road Race Championships – Women's elite race
Race details
- Region: Uzbekistan
- Discipline: Road bicycle racing
- Type: One-day

History
- First edition: 2013
- First winner: Olga Drobysheva
- Most wins: Olga Drobysheva; Yanina Kuskova; (2 wins)
- Most recent: Shaknoza Abdullaeva

Year	Gold	Silver	Bronze
2013	Olga Drobysheva	Alia Bezuglova	Svetlana Isayeva
2014	Olga Drobysheva	Alexandra Okhvat	
2015			
2016			
2017	Olga Jantuganova	Margarita Misyurina	Sofiya Karimova
2018	Ekaterina Knebeleva	Diana Adelshinova	Renata Baymetova
2019	Olga Zabelinskaya	Renata Baymetova	Ekaterina Knebeleva
2020	Yanina Kuskova	Anna Kulikova	Renata Baymetova
2021	Yanina Kuskova	Nafosat Kozieva	Shaknoza Abdullaeva
2022	Shaknoza Abdullaeva	Margarita Misyurina	Nafosat Kozieva
