= Vladimir Tuychiev =

Uzbekistani cyclist (born 1983)

Personal information
- Born: 23 March 1983 (age 43)

Cycling career
- Sport: Cycling
- Disciplines: Track; Road
- Role: Rider
- Rider type: Time trialist

Professional teams
- 2012: Uzbekistan Suren Team
- 2013: Team Velo Reality

Vladimir Tuychiev (born 23 March 1983) is an Uzbekistani road and track cyclist. He competed 2007, 2011, 2012 and 2013 UCI Track Cycling World Championships. On the road he competed in the time trial at the 2007 UCI Road World Championships and 2008 UCI Road World Championships.

== Major results ==
=== Road ===
2002
2nd Road race, National Road Championships
2004
3rd Time trial, National Road Championships
7th Time trial, Asian Cycling Championships
2005
2nd Time trial, National Road Championships
3rd Time trial, Asian Cycling Championships
8th Overall Tour de Korea
2006
3rd Road race, National Road Championships
9th Time trial, Asian Games
2007
National Road Championships

1st Time trial
3rd Road race

2nd Trofeo Città di Castelfidardo
Asian Cycling Championships

3rd Time trial
4th Road race

7th Road race, UCI B World Championships
7th Overall Tour of South China Sea
10th Ruota d'Oro
2008
National Road Championships

1st Time trial
3rd Road race

10th Memorial Davide Fardelli
10th Gran Premio San Giuseppe
2009
National Road Championships

1st Time trial
2nd Road race

Asian Cycling Championships

6th Road race
10th Time trial

8th Overall Perlis Open

1st Stage 3

2011
1st Golan I
2nd Golan II
3rd Road race, National Road Championships
2013
2nd Time trial, National Road Championships
10th Overall Sharjah International Cycling Tour
2014
2nd Time trial, National Road Championships
2016
3rd Time trial, National Road Championships

=== Track ===
2006
2nd Points race, Asian Games
2009
Asian Championships

1st Points race
2nd Individual pursuit

2010
1st Points race, Asian Games
2012
3rd Individual pursuit, Asian Championships
