= Selam Amha =

Ethiopian cyclist (born 1997)

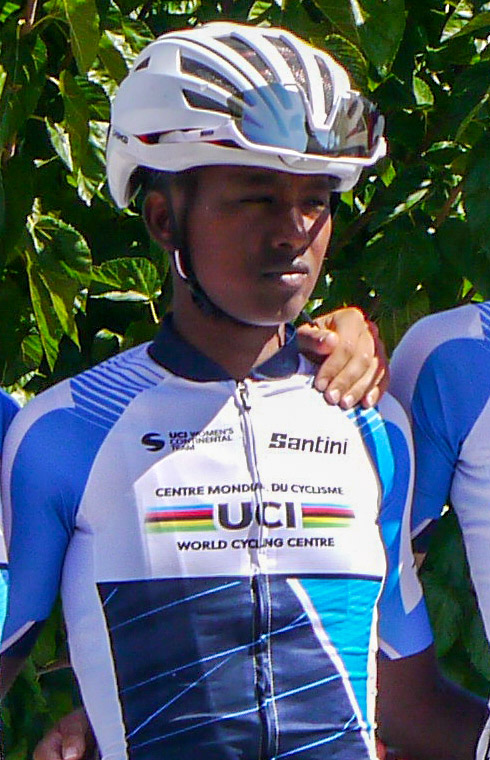
- Amha GEREFIEL SELAM at the start of stage 7 of the TCFIA 2022.

Personal information
- Born: 3 September 1997 (age 29)

Cycling career
- Sport: Cycling
- Current team: Canyon–SRAM Generation
- Discipline: Road
- Role: Rider

Professional teams
- 2021–2023: WCC Team
- 2024–: Canyon–SRAM Generation

Selam Amha (born 3 September 1997) is an Ethiopian cyclist, who currently rides for UCI Women's Continental Team Canyon–SRAM Generation. She competed in the women's road race event at the 2020 Summer Olympics.

== Major results ==
2016
1st Road race, National Road Championships
2017
African Road Championships

2nd Team time trial
10th Road race

2018
African Road Championships

1st Team time trial
2nd Time trial
8th Road race

National Road Championships

1st Road race
1st Time trial

2019
African Road Championships

1st Time trial
1st Team time trial

African Games

3rd Team time trial
4th Time trial
10th Road race

2021
African Road Championships

3rd Team time trial
3rd Mixed team relay
4th Time trial
7th Road race

2023
10th Overall Vuelta Extremadura Féminas
