= Nikita Tsvetkov =

Russian-Uzbekistani cyclist (born 2005)

- Tsvetkov in 2026

Personal information
- Born: 14 February 2005 (age 21) Russia
- Height: 1.80 m (5 ft 11 in)
- Weight: 67 kg (148 lb)

Cycling career
- Sport: Cycling
- Current team: Bardiani–CSF 7 Saber
- Disciplines: Road; Track
- Role: Rider

Amateur teams
- 2022: Cannibal Team
- 2023: Team Culture Vélo U19

Professional teams
- 2024–2025: Tashkent City Professional Cycling Team
- 2025: Team Solution Tech–Vini Fantini (stagiaire)
- 2026–: Bardiani–CSF 7 Saber
Medal record
Men's track cycling
Representing Uzbekistan
Asian Games
Bronze medal – third place	2026 Aichi–Nagoya	Madison
Asian Championships
Silver medal – second place	2024 New Delhi	Elimination
Bronze medal – third place	2026 Tagaytay	Elimination

Nikita Tsvetkov (born 14 February 2005) is a Russian-Uzbekistani cyclist who currently competes for UCI ProTeam Bardiani–CSF 7 Saber. Tsvetkov competed in his youth for the Russian Cycling Federation, becoming a Russian junior champion twice. In 2023, Tsvetkov moved to the Uzbekistani Cycling Federation and began competing under the flag of Uzbekistan in international races. During the 2023 season, Tsvetkov competed for Uzbekistan at the 2022 Asian Games in track cycling, competing in the Madison and the team pursuit. In 2024, Tsvetkov moved to the professional level, signing to compete for UCI team Tashkent City Professional Cycling. Tsvetkov won the Uzbekistan National Time Trial Championships in 2024.

Tsvetkov was selected to represent Uzbekistan in the Men's road race at the 2024 Summer Olympics. Tsvetkov started, but failed to finish.

== Major results ==
2022
2nd Overall Velo Alanya Junior

1st Stage 2

4th Overall Manavgat Side Junior
2023
1st Overall Tour of Marand

1st Stages 1, 2, & 3

2024
National Road Championships

1st Time trial
3rd Road race

5th Overall Tour of Sakarya
7th Grand Prix Antalya Airport City
8th Grand Prix Syedra Ancient City
2025
National Road Championships

1st Time trial
1st Under-23 road race
1st Under-23 time trial

2nd Grand Prix Kahramanmaraş
3rd Overall Tour of Bostonliq

1st Stages 1 & 2

4th Grand Prix Edebiyat Yolu
9th Overall Tour of Azerbaijan (Iran)
9th Overall Tour of Thailand
2026
1st Time trial, National Road Championships
1st Overall Grand Prix Fergana

1st Stage 2

3rd Overall Grand Prix Jizzakh

=== Grand Tour general classification results timeline ===
Grand Tour	2026
Giro d'Italia	109
Tour de France	—
Vuelta a España	—

Legend
—	Did not compete
DNF	Did not finish
