= Uzbekistan National Time Trial Championships =

National road cycling championship in Uzbekistan

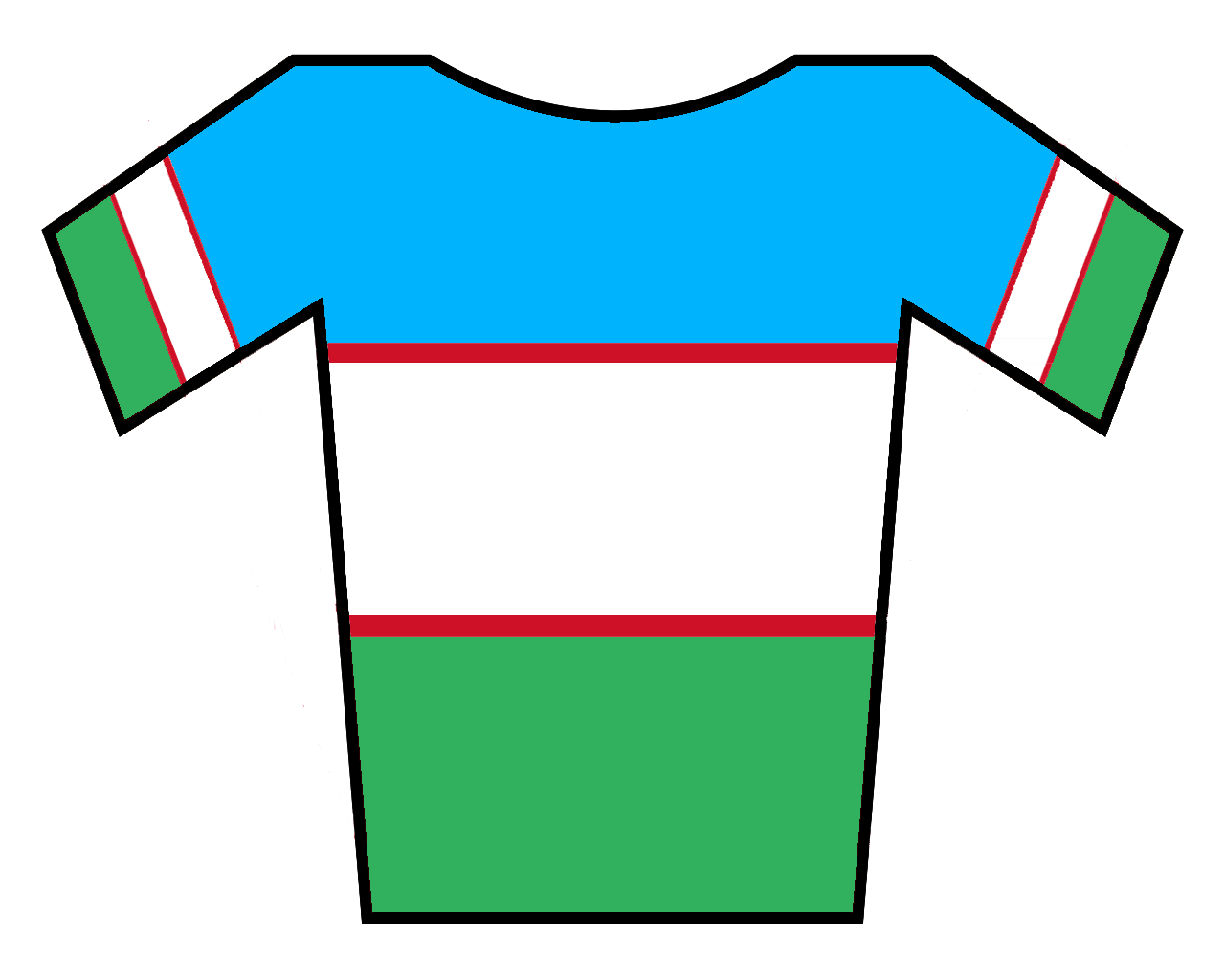
The champion's jersey

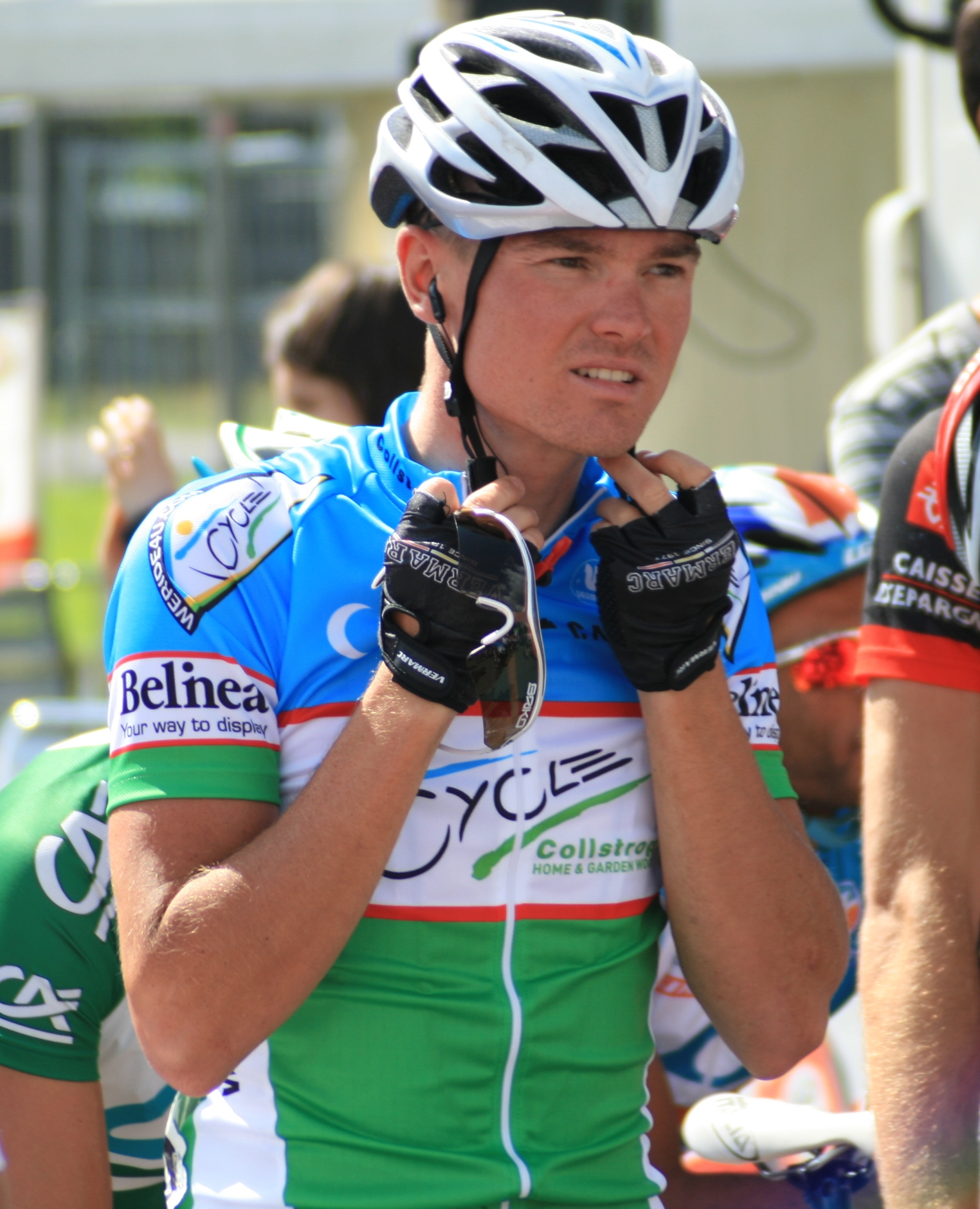
Sergey Lagutin wearing the champion jersey.

The Uzbekistan National Time Trial Championship is a road bicycle race that takes place inside the Uzbekistan National Cycling Championship, and decides the best cyclist in this type of race. The first edition took place in 1998, with the winner being Enver Setmemetov. The current champions are Aleksey Fomovskiy and Margarita Misyurina.

== Multiple winners ==
Men

Wins	Name	Years
11	Muradjan Khalmuratov	2011, 2012, 2013, 2014, 2015, 2016, 2017, 2018, 2019, 2020, 2021
3	Vladimir Tuychiev	2007, 2008, 2009
2	Sergey Krushevskiy	2002, 2003
2	Sergey Lagutin	2004, 2005
2	Aleksey Fomovskiy	2022, 2023

Women

Wins	Name	Years
2	Olga Drobysheva	2013, 2014
2	Renata Baymetova	2017, 2018
2	Yanina Kuskova	2020, 2021

== Men ==
Uzbekistan National Time Trial Championships – Men's elite race
Race details
- Region: Uzbekistan
- Discipline: Road bicycle racing
- Type: One-day

History
- First edition: 1998
- First winner: Enver Setmemetov
- Most wins: Muradjan Khalmuratov (11 wins)
- Most recent: Nikita Tsvetkov

Year	Gold	Silver	Bronze
1998	Enver Setmemetov	Kahraman Mominov	Rafael Nuritdinov
1999	Damir Iratov	Enver Setmemetov	Sergei Arkov
2000	Ulugbek Salamov	Damir Iratov	Enver Setmemetov
2001	Artem Shlindov	Kahraman Mominov	Sergey Bakin
2002	Sergey Krushevskiy	Damir Iratov	Artem Shlindov
2003	Sergey Krushevskiy	Sergey Lagutin	Artem Shlindov
2004	Sergey Lagutin	Rafael Nuritdinov	Vladimir Tuychiev
2005	Sergey Lagutin	Vladimir Tuychiev	Nikolay Kazakbaev
2006	Nikolay Kazakbaev	Sergey Lagutin	Konstantin Kalinin
2007	Vladimir Tuychiev	Nikolay Kazakbaev	Muradjan Khalmuratov
2008	Vladimir Tuychiev	Sergey Lagutin	Muradjan Khalmuratov
2009	Vladimir Tuychiev	Muradjan Khalmuratov	Konstantin Kalinin
2010	Ruslan Karimov	Muradjan Khalmuratov	Konstantin Kalinin
2011	Muradjan Khalmuratov	Vadim Shaekhov	Vladimir Tuychiev
2012	Muradjan Khalmuratov	Konstantin Volik	Vadim Shaekhov
2013	Muradjan Khalmuratov	Vladimir Tuychiev	Abdullojon Akparov
2014	Muradjan Khalmuratov	Vladimir Tuychiev	Gleb Gorbachev
2015	Muradjan Khalmuratov	Gleb Gorbachev	Timur Gumerov
2016	Muradjan Khalmuratov	Andrey Izmaylov	Vladimir Tuychiev
2017	Muradjan Khalmuratov	Ruslan Karimov	Ruslan Fedorov
2018	Muradjan Khalmuratov	Dilmurdjon Siddikov	Iskandarbek Shodiev
2019	Muradjan Khalmuratov	Dilmurdjon Siddikov	Sergey Medvedev
2020	Muradjan Khalmuratov	Dilmurdjon Siddikov	Danil Evdokimov
2021	Muradjan Khalmuratov	Aleksey Fomovskiy	Behzodek Rakhimbaev
2022	Aleksey Fomovskiy	Dmitriy Bocharov	Konstantin Elli
2023	Aleksey Fomovskiy	Muradjan Halmuratov	Dmitriy Bocharov
2024	Nikita Tsvetkov	Dmitriy Bocharov	Farrukh Bobosherov

== Women ==
Uzbekistan National Time Trial Championships – Women's elite race
Race details
- Region: Uzbekistan
- Discipline: Road bicycle racing
- Type: One-day

History
- First edition: 2013
- First winner: Olga Drobysheva
- Most wins: Olga Drobysheva; Renata Baymetova; Yanina Kuskova; (2 wins)
- Most recent: Margarita Misyurina

Year	Gold	Silver	Bronze
2013	Olga Drobysheva	Alla Bezuglova	Svetlana Isaeva
2014	Olga Drobysheva	Alexandra Okhvat	
2015			
2016			
2017	Renata Baymetova	Ekaterina Knebeleva	Olga Jantuganova
2018	Renata Baymetova	Ekaterina Knebeleva	Diana Adelshinova
2019	Olga Zabelinskaya	Renata Baymetova	Ekaterina Knebeleva
2020	Yanina Kuskova	Renata Baymetova	Ekaterina Knebeleva
2021	Yanina Kuskova	Anna Kulikova	Evgeniya Golotina
2022	Margarita Misyurina	Madina Kakhorova	Shaknoza Abdullaeva
