= 2007–08 UCI Africa Tour =

- Fourth edition of the UCI Africa Tour

Details
- Dates: 5 October 2007–14 September 2008
- Location: Africa
- Races: 18

Champions
- Individual champion: Nicholas White (RSA) (Team MTN)
- Teams' champion: Team MTN
- Nations' champion: South Africa

The 2007–08 UCI Africa Tour was the fourth season of the UCI Africa Tour. The season began on 5 October 2007 with the Grand Prix Chantal Biya and ended on 14 September 2008 with the Powerade Dome 2 Dome.

The points leader, based on the cumulative results of previous races, wears the UCI Africa Tour cycling jersey. Hassen Ben Nasser from Tunisia was the defending champion of the 2006–07 UCI Africa Tour. Nicholas White of South Africa was crowned as the 2007–08 UCI Africa Tour champion.

Throughout the season, points are awarded to the top finishers of stages within stage races and the final general classification standings of each of the stages races and one-day events. The quality and complexity of a race also determines how many points are awarded to the top finishers, the higher the UCI rating of a race, the more points are awarded. The UCI ratings from highest to lowest are as follows:

- Multi-day events: 2.HC, 2.1 and 2.2
- One-day events: 1.HC, 1.1 and 1.2

== Events ==
=== 2007 ===
Date	Race Name	Location	UCI Rating	Winner	Team
5–7 October	Grand Prix Chantal Biya	Cameroon	2.2	Peter Van Agtmaal (NED)	CCN Sportswear
26 October–4 November	Tour du Faso	Burkina Faso	2.2	Adil Jelloul (MAR)	Morocco (national team)
29 October–4 November	Tour des Aéroports	Tunisia	2.2	Ali Ahmed Mohamed (LBA)	Libya (national team)
9 November	African Continental Championships – Time Trial	Cameroon	CC	Nicholas White (RSA)	South Africa (national team)
11 November	African Continental Championships – Road Race	Cameroon	CC	Nicholas White (RSA)	South Africa (national team)

=== 2008 ===
Date	Race Name	Location	UCI Rating	Winner	Team
16–20 January	La Tropicale Amissa Bongo	Gabon	2.1	Lilian Jégou (FRA)	Française des Jeux
11–17 February	Tour d'Egypte	Egypt	2.2	Jay Thomson (RSA)	Team MTN
19 February	GP of Sharm el-Sheikh	Egypt	1.2	Amr Mahmoud (EGY)	Egypt (national team)
4–8 March	Giro del Capo	South Africa	2.2	Christian Pfannberger (AUT)	Barloworld
7–11 March	Tour Ivoirien de la Paix	Ivory Coast	2.1	Rony Martias (FRA)	Bouygues Télécom
15–21 March	Tour of Libya	Libya	2.2	Omar Hasanin (SYR)	Doha Team
28 March–6 April	Tour du Cameroun	Cameroon	2.2	Joseph Sanda (CMR)	SNH Velo Club
30 March–5 April	Tour de la Pharmacie Centrale	Tunisia	2.2	Thomas Nauzaret (FRA)	France (national team)
7 April	Grand Prix de la ville de Tunis	Tunisia	1.2	Azzedine Lagab (ALG)	
8 April	GP Banque de l'Habitat	Tunisia	1.2	Azzedine Lagab (ALG)	
12–18 May	Boucle du Coton	Burkina Faso	2.2	Gueswende Sawadogo (BUR)	Burkina Faso (national team)
30 May–8 June	Tour du Maroc	Morocco	2.2	Alexey Shchebelin (RUS)	Cinelli OPD
14 September	Powerade Dome 2 Dome	South Africa	1.2	Nolan Hoffman (RSA)	Team Neotel

== Final standings ==
=== Individual classification ===
Rank	Name	Points
1.	Nicholas White (RSA)	241
2.	Jay Robert Thomson (RSA)	184
3.	Robert Hunter (RSA)	165
4.	Hassen Ben Nasser (TUN)	132
5.	Christoff van Heerden (RSA)	132
6.	Adil Jelloul (MAR)	128
7.	Azzedine Lagab (ALG)	118
8.	Malcolm Lange (RSA)	108
9.	Ian McLeod (RSA)	106
10.	Christian Pfannberger (AUT)	103

=== Team classification ===
Rank	Team	Points
1.	Team MTN	885
2.	Barloworld	409
3.	Team Neotel	282
4.	Doha Team	227
5.	Team Konica Minolta–Bizhub	150
6.	Dukla Trenčín Merida	133
7.	Cinelli–OPD	132
8.	Bretagne-Armor Lux	116
9.	House of Paint	94
10.	L.P.R. Brakes	82

=== Nation classification ===
Rank	Nation	Points
1.	South Africa	1434
2.	Tunisia	512
3.	Algeria	404
4.	Morocco	343
5.	Burkina Faso	330
6.	Namibia	225
7.	Cameroon	209
8.	Libya	143
9.	Lesotho	137
10.	Mauritius	130

=== Nation under-23 classification ===
Rank	Nation under-23	Points
1.	South Africa	478
2.	Algeria	324
3.	Tunisia	283
4.	Eritrea	81
5.	Mauritius	67
6.	Angola	54
7.	Egypt	42
8.	Libya	24
9.	Cameroon	21
10.	Lesotho	16
