= 2008–09 UCI Asia Tour =

- Fifth edition of the UCI Asia Tour

Details
- Dates: 4 October 2008–13 September 2009
- Location: Asia
- Races: 31

Champions
- Individual champion: Ghader Mizbani (IRI) (Tabriz Petrochemical Team)
- Teams' champion: Tabriz Petrochemical Team
- Nations' champion: Kazakhstan

The 2008–09 UCI Asia Tour was the 5th season of the UCI Asia Tour. The season began on 4 October 2008 with the Tour of Milad du Nour and ended on 13 September 2009 with the Tour de Hokkaido.

The points leader, based on the cumulative results of previous races, wears the UCI Asia Tour cycling jersey. Hossein Askari from Iran was the defending champion of the 2007–08 UCI Asia Tour. Ghader Mizbani of Iran was crowned as the 2008–09 UCI Asia Tour champion.

Throughout the season, points are awarded to the top finishers of stages within stage races and the final general classification standings of each of the stages races and one-day events. The quality and complexity of a race also determines how many points are awarded to the top finishers, the higher the UCI rating of a race, the more points are awarded.

The UCI ratings from highest to lowest are as follows:

- Multi-day events: 2.HC, 2.1 and 2.2
- One-day events: 1.HC, 1.1 and 1.2

== Events ==
=== 2008 ===
Date	Race Name	Location	UCI Rating	Winner	Team
4–8 October	Tour of Milad du Nour	Iran	2.2	Ahad Kazemi (IRI)	Tabriz Petrochemical Team
12–16 October	Kerman Tour	Iran	2.2	Ghader Mizbani (IRI)	Tabriz Petrochemical Team
19–25 October	Tour of Hong Kong Shanghai	Hong Kong; China	2.2	Christoff van Heerden (RSA)	Team Konica Minolta–Bizhub
26 October	Japan Cup	Japan	1.HC	Damiano Cunego (ITA)	Lampre
8–9 November	Tour de Okinawa	Japan	2.2	Yukiya Arashiro (JPN)	Meitan Hompo-GDR
11–19 November	Tour of Hainan	China	2.1	Boris Shpilevsky (RUS)	Preti Mangimi
23 November–5 December	Tour d'Indonesia	Indonesia	2.2	Ghader Mizbani (IRI)	Tabriz Petrochemical Team
13 December	International Grand Prix Al-Khor	Qatar	1.2	Rafaâ Chtioui (TUN)	Doha Team
14 December	International Grand Prix Losail	Qatar	1.2	Abdelbasset Hannachi (ALG)	Doha Team
14–21 December	Tour of South China Sea	China; Hong Kong; Macau	2.2	Xu Gang (CHN)	Hong Kong Shanghai Sports Institute
15 December	International Grand Prix Messaeed	Qatar	1.2	Aymen Ben Hassine (TUN)	Doha Team
16 December	International Grand Prix Doha	Qatar	1.2	Aymen Ben Hassine (TUN)	Doha Team
18–20 December	Cycling Golden Jersey	Qatar	2.2	Alexey Lyalko (KAZ)	Ulan

=== 2009 ===
Date	Race Name	Location	UCI Rating	Winner	Team
23 January	H. H. Vice President Cup	United Arab Emirates	1.2	Aymen Ben Hassine (TUN)	Doha Team
24 January	Emirates Cup	United Arab Emirates	1.2	Aymen Ben Hassine (TUN)	Doha Team
1–6 February	Tour of Qatar	Qatar	2.1	Tom Boonen (BEL)	Quick-Step
9–15 February	Tour de Langkawi	Malaysia	2.HC	José Serpa (COL)	Diquigiovanni–Androni
8–14 March	Tour de Taiwan	Taiwan	2.2	Krzysztof Jezowski (POL)	CCC–Polsat–Polkowice
4–9 April	Tour of Thailand	Thailand	2.2	Andrew Bajadali (USA)	Kelly Benefit Strategies
19–26 April	Jelajah Malaysia	Malaysia	2.2	Tim Roe (AUS)	Savings & Loans Cycling Team
30 April–3 May	Tour of Singkarak	Indonesia	2.2	Ghader Mizbani (IRI)	Tabriz Petrochemical Team
11–15 May	President Tour of Iran	Iran	2.2	Ghader Mizbani (IRI)	Tabriz Petrochemical Team
17–24 May	Tour of Japan	Japan	2.2	Sergio Pardilla (ESP)	Carmiooro A Style
28–31 May	Tour de Kumano	Japan	2.2	Valentin Iglinsky (KAZ)	Kazakhstan (national team)
5–14 June	Tour de Korea	South Korea	2.2	Roger Beuchat (SUI)	Team Neotel
17–26 July	Tour of Qinghai Lake	China	2.HC	Andrey Mizurov (KAZ)	Tabriz Petrochemical Team
28–30 July	Perlis Open	Malaysia	2.2	Anuar Manam (MAS)	Azad University Iran
8–10 August	Tour de East Java	Indonesia	2.2	Andrey Mizurov (KAZ)	Tabriz Petrochemical Team
16 August	Asian Cycling Championships – Road race	Indonesia	CC	Dmitry Fofonov (KAZ)	Kazakhstan (national team)
17 August	Asian Cycling Championships – Time trial	Indonesia	CC	Alexander Vinokourov (KAZ)	Kazakhstan (national team)
9–13 September	Tour de Hokkaido	Japan	2.2	Takashi Miyazawa (JPN)	EQA-Meitan Hompo-Graphite Design

== Final standings ==
=== Individual classification ===
Rank	Name	Team	Points
1.	Ghader Mizbani (IRI)	Tabriz Petrochemical Team	384.5
2.	Andrey Mizurov (KAZ)	Tabriz Petrochemical Team	368.5
3.	Boris Shpilevsky (RUS)	Russia (national team)	254
4.	Dmitry Fofonov (KAZ)	Kazakhstan (national team)	242
5.	Valentin Iglinsky (KAZ)	Kazakhstan (national team)	217
6.	Aymen Ben Hassine (TUN)	Doha Team	179.66
7.	Abdelbasset Hannachi (ALG)	Doha Team	178
8.	Takashi Miyazawa (JPN)	EQA-Meitan Hompo-Graphite Design	161
9.	Taiji Nishitani (JPN)	Aisan Racing Team	152.25
10.	Jai Crawford (AUS)	Savings & Loans Cycling Team	146

=== Team classification ===
Rank	Team	Points
1.	Tabriz Petrochemical Team	1015
2.	Doha Team	628.66
3.	Azad University Iran	438
4.	Diquigiovanni–Androni	335
5.	EQA-Meitan Hompo-Graphite Design	268
6.	Aisan Racing Team	250
7.	Savings & Loans Cycling Team	240
8.	Cervélo TestTeam	228
9.	Seoul Cycling Team	210
10.	Carmiooro A Style	205

=== Nation classification ===
Rank	Nation	Points
1.	Kazakhstan	1259.82
2.	Iran	1015.5
3.	Japan	780.25
4.	Malaysia	292
5.	Uzbekistan	255.98
6.	South Korea	255
7.	Kyrgyzstan	185
8.	China	183
9.	Hong Kong	150
10.	Syria	139

=== Nation under-23 classification ===
Rank	Nation under-23	Points
1.	Iran	160
2.	Kazakhstan	89.98
3.	Malaysia	63
3.	Japan	63
5.	Mongolia	44
6.	Thailand	41
7.	Vietnam	40
8.	North Korea	38
9.	China	36
10.	South Korea	30
