= 2006–07 UCI Africa Tour =

- Third edition of the UCI Africa Tour

Details
- Dates: 6 October 2006–16 September 2007
- Location: Africa
- Races: 18

Champions
- Individual champion: Hassen Ben Nasser (TUN)
- Teams' champion: Barloworld
- Nations' champion: South Africa

The 2006–07 UCI Africa Tour was the third season of the UCI Africa Tour. The season began on 6 October 2006 with the Grand Prix Chantal Biya and ended on 16 September 2007 with the Dome 2 Dome Cycling Spectacular.

The points leader, based on the cumulative results of previous races, wears the UCI Africa Tour cycling jersey. Rabaki Jérémie Ouédraogo of Burkina Faso was the defending champion of the 2005–06 UCI Africa Tour. Hassen Ben Nasser of Tunisia was crowned as the 2006–07 UCI Africa Tour champion.

Throughout the season, points are awarded to the top finishers of stages within stage races and the final general classification standings of each of the stages races and one-day events. The quality and complexity of a race also determines how many points are awarded to the top finishers, the higher the UCI rating of a race, the more points are awarded. The UCI ratings from highest to lowest are as follows:

- Multi-day events: 2.HC, 2.1 and 2.2
- One-day events: 1.HC, 1.1 and 1.2

== Events ==
=== 2006 ===
Date	Race name	Location	UCI Rating	Winner	Team
6–8 October	Grand Prix Chantal Biya	Cameroon	2.2	Flaubert Douanla (CMR)	SNH Vélo Club
25 October–5 November	Tour du Faso	Burkina Faso	2.2	David Verdonck (BEL)	Bio Avia Mode Markets
30 October–6 November	Tour des Aéroports	Tunisia	2.2	Hassen Ben Nasser (TUN)	Pharmacie Centrale
10 November	African Cycling Championships – Time Trial	Mauritius	CC	Robert Hunter (RSA)	South Africa (national team)
12 November	African Cycling Championships – Road Race	Mauritius	CC	Darren Lill (RSA)	South Africa (national team)
17–26 November	Tour du Maroc	Morocco	2.2	Ján Šipeky (SVK)	Slovakia (national team)

=== 2007 ===
Date	Race name	Location	UCI Rating	Winner	Team
16–21 January	La Tropicale Amissa Bongo	Gabon	2.2	Frédéric Guesdon (FRA)	Française des Jeux
8–14 February	Tour d'Egypte	Egypt	2.2	Waylon Woolcock (RSA)	South Africa (national team)
16 February	GP of Sharm el-Sheikh	Egypt	1.2	Ján Šipeky (SVK)	Dukla Trenčín–Merida
24 February–9 March	Tour du Cameroun	Cameroon	2.2	Flavien Chipault (FRA)	Leboulou
6–11 March	Giro del Capo	South Africa	2.2	Alexander Efimkin (RUS)	Barloworld
17–23 March	Tour of Libya	Libya	2.2	Ahmed Mohamed Ali (LBA)	Libya (national team)
8 April	Grand Prix de la ville de Tunis	Tunisia	1.2	Ahmed Mraihi (TUN)	Tunisia (national team)
28 April–5 May	Tour de la Pharmacie Centrale de Tunisie	Tunisia	2.2	Hassen Ben Nasser (TUN)	Pharmacie Centrale
14–20 May	Boucle du Coton	Burkina Faso	2.2	Saïdou Rouamba (BUR)	Burkina Faso (national team)
8–17 June	Tour du Maroc	Morocco	2.2	Nicholas White (RSA)	South Africa (national team)
30 August–8 September	Tour du Sénégal	Senegal	2.2	Adil Jelloul (MAR)	FRMC-Maroc
16 September	Dome 2 Dome Cycling Spectacular	South Africa	1.2	Jaco Venter (RSA)	Team Neotel

== Final standings ==
=== Individual classification ===
Rank	Name	Points
1.	Hassen Ben Nasser (TUN)	232
2.	Fethi Ahmed Atunsi (LBA)	168
3.	Ahmed Mohammed Ali (LBA)	146
4.	Daniel Spence (RSA)	141
5.	Malcolm Lange (RSA)	136
6.	Aymen Ben Hassine (TUN)	132
7.	Ján Šipeky (SVK)	128
8.	David George (RSA)	114
9.	Aymen Berini (TUN)	112
10.	Abdelatif Saadoune (MAR)	112

=== Team classification ===
Rank	Team	Points
1.	Barloworld	190
2.	Dukla Trenčín Merida	184
3.	Ceramica Panaria–Navigare	106
4.	Universal Caffè-Ecopetrol	91
5.	Team Lamonta	57
6.	Amore & Vita–McDonald's	49
7.	Team Konica Minolta	48
8.	Team Differdange	38
9.	Moscou Stars	34
10.	Notebooksbilliger.de	31

=== Nation classification ===
Rank	Nation	Points
1.	South Africa	1357
2.	Tunisia	530
3.	Libya	318
4.	Cameroon	216
5.	Namibia	189
6.	Morocco	162
7.	Egypt	158
8.	Burkina Faso	152
9.	Algeria	40
10.	Kenya	37

=== Nation under-23 classification ===
Rank	Nation under-23	Points
1.	Tunisia	286
2.	South Africa	279
3.	Libya	135
4.	Morocco	49
5.	Namibia	45
6.	Kenya	33
7.	Egypt	27
8.	Algeria	26
9.	Cameroon	23
10.	Ivory Coast	10
