= 2009–10 UCI Africa Tour =

Cycling championship

- Sixth edition of the UCI Africa Tour

Details
- Dates: 1 October 2009–21 May 2010
- Location: Africa
- Races: 17

Champions
- Individual champion: Abdelatif Saadoune (MAR)
- Teams' champion: MTN–Energade
- Nations' champion: Morocco

The 2009–10 UCI Africa Tour was the sixth season of the UCI Africa Tour. The season began on 1 October 2009 with the Grand Prix Chantal Biya and ended on 21 May 2010 with the Tour of Eritrea.

The points leader, based on the cumulative results of previous races, wears the UCI Africa Tour cycling jersey. Dan Craven of Namibia was the defending champion of the 2008–09 UCI Africa Tour. Abdelatif Saadoune of Morocco was crowned as the 2009–10 UCI Africa Tour champion.

Throughout the season, points are awarded to the top finishers of stages within stage races and the final general classification standings of each of the stages races and one-day events. The quality and complexity of a race also determines how many points are awarded to the top finishers, the higher the UCI rating of a race, the more points are awarded. The UCI ratings from highest to lowest are as follows:

- Multi-day events: 2.HC, 2.1 and 2.2
- One-day events: 1.HC, 1.1 and 1.2

== Events ==
=== 2009 ===
Date	Race Name	Location	UCI Rating	Winner	Team
1–4 October	Grand Prix Chantal Biya	Cameroon	2.2	Peter Van Agtmaal (NED)	Global Cycling
23 October–1 November	Tour du Faso	Burkina Faso	2.2	Abdelatif Saadoune (MAR)	Morocco (national team)
4 November	African Continental Championships – Team Time Trial	Namibia	CC	Jay Thomson (RSA); Reinardt Janse van Rensburg (RSA); Ian McLeod (RSA); Christoff Van Heerden (RSA)	South Africa (national team)
6 November	African Continental Championships – Time Trial	Namibia	CC	Jay Thomson (RSA)	South Africa (national team)
8 November	African Continental Championships – Road Race	Namibia	CC	Ian McLeod (RSA)	South Africa (national team)
16–24 November	Tour of Rwanda	Rwanda	2.2	Adil Jelloul (MAR)	Morocco (national team)
28 November–2 December	Tour of Eritrea	Eritrea	2.2	Bereket Yemane (ERI)	Eritrea (national team)

=== 2010 ===
Date	Race Name	Location	UCI Rating	Winner	Team
19–24 January	La Tropicale Amissa Bongo	Gabon	2.1	Anthony Charteau (FRA)	Bbox Bouygues Telecom
15–26 February	Tour du Cameroun	Cameroon	2.2	Milan Barenyi (SVK)	Slovakia (national team)
7–13 March	Tour du Mali	Mali	2.2	Mouhssine Lahsaini (MAR)	Morocco (national team)
13–17 March	Tour of Libya	Libya	2.2	Ahmed Belgasem (LBA)	Libya (national team)
19 March	Grand Prix of Al Fatah	Libya	1.2	Chris Opie (GBR)	Pendragon-Le Col-Colnago
26 March–4 April	Tour du Maroc	Morocco	2.2	Dean Podgornik (SLO)	Loborika
7 May	Trophée Princier	Morocco	1.2	Roberto Richeze (ARG)	Betonexpressz 2000-Universal Caffè
8 May	Trophée de l'Anniversaire	Morocco	1.2	Mohammed El Ammoury (MAR)	Morocco (national team)
9 May	Trophée de la Maison Royale	Morocco	1.2	Adriano Angeloni (ITA)	Betonexpressz 2000-Universal Caffè
17–21 May	Tour of Eritrea	Eritrea	2.2	Natnael Berhane (ERI)	Eritrea (national team)

== Final standings ==
=== Individual classification ===
Rank	Name	Points
1.	Abdelatif Saadoune (MAR)	231
2.	Ian McLeod (RSA)	202.66
3.	Mouhssine Lahsaïn (MAR)	174
4.	Adil Jelloul (MAR)	154
5.	Mohammed Said El Ammoury (MAR)	140
6.	Anthony Charteau (FRA)	131
7.	Christoff van Heerden (RSA)	107.66
8.	Jay Robert Thomson (RSA)	96.66
9.	Dean Podgornik (SLO)	96
10.	Abdelbasset Hannachi (ALG)	94

=== Team classification ===
Rank	Team	Points
1.	MTN–Energade	455.98
2.	Bbox Bouygues Telecom	200
3.	Loborika	130
4.	Cofidis	112
5.	Fly V Australia	96.66
6.	Tecnofilm-Betonexpressz 2000	96
7.	Team Type 1	68
8.	Acqua & Sapone	40
9.	Katyusha Continental Team	33
10.	Team Designa Køkken	32

=== Nation classification ===
Rank	Nation	Points
1.	Morocco	935
2.	South Africa	930.64
3.	Eritrea	444
4.	Namibia	263.64
5.	Tunisia	206
6.	Algeria	159
7.	Zimbabwe	137
8.	Cameroon	122
9.	Libya	91.98
10.	Rwanda	87

=== Nation under-23 classification ===
Rank	Nation under-23	Points
1.	Eritrea	216
2.	South Africa	95.66
3.	Tunisia	56
4.	Burkina Faso	44
5.	Namibia	21
6.	Cameroon	15
7.	Zambia	12
8.	Zimbabwe	12
9.	Ivory Coast	10.66
10.	Libya	7.66
