= 2016 national road cycling championships =

The 2016 national road cycling championships began in Australia with the time trial event (both men and women) on 7 January, as is tradition.

== Jerseys ==
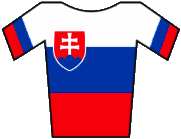
Slovak Champion

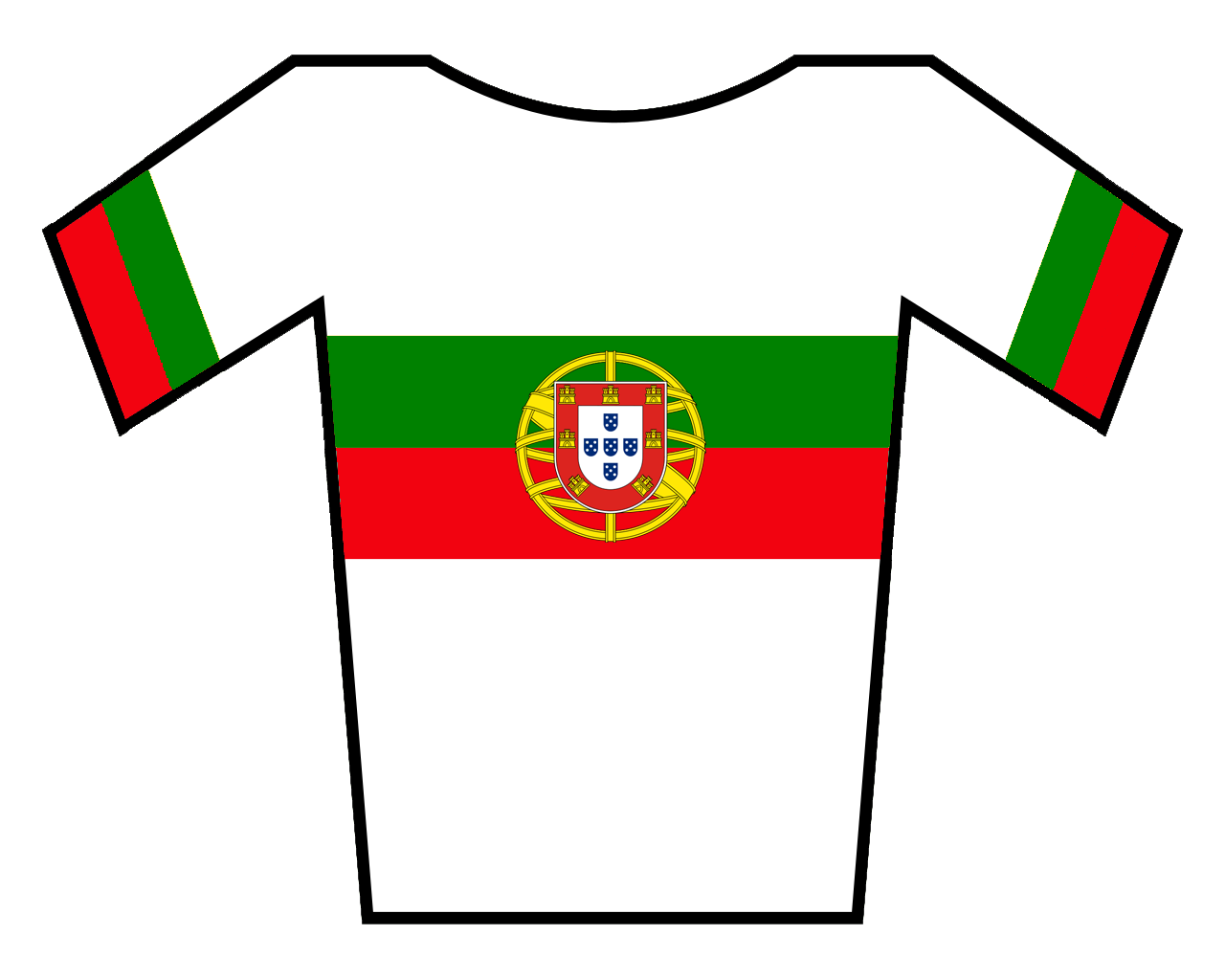
Portuguese Champion

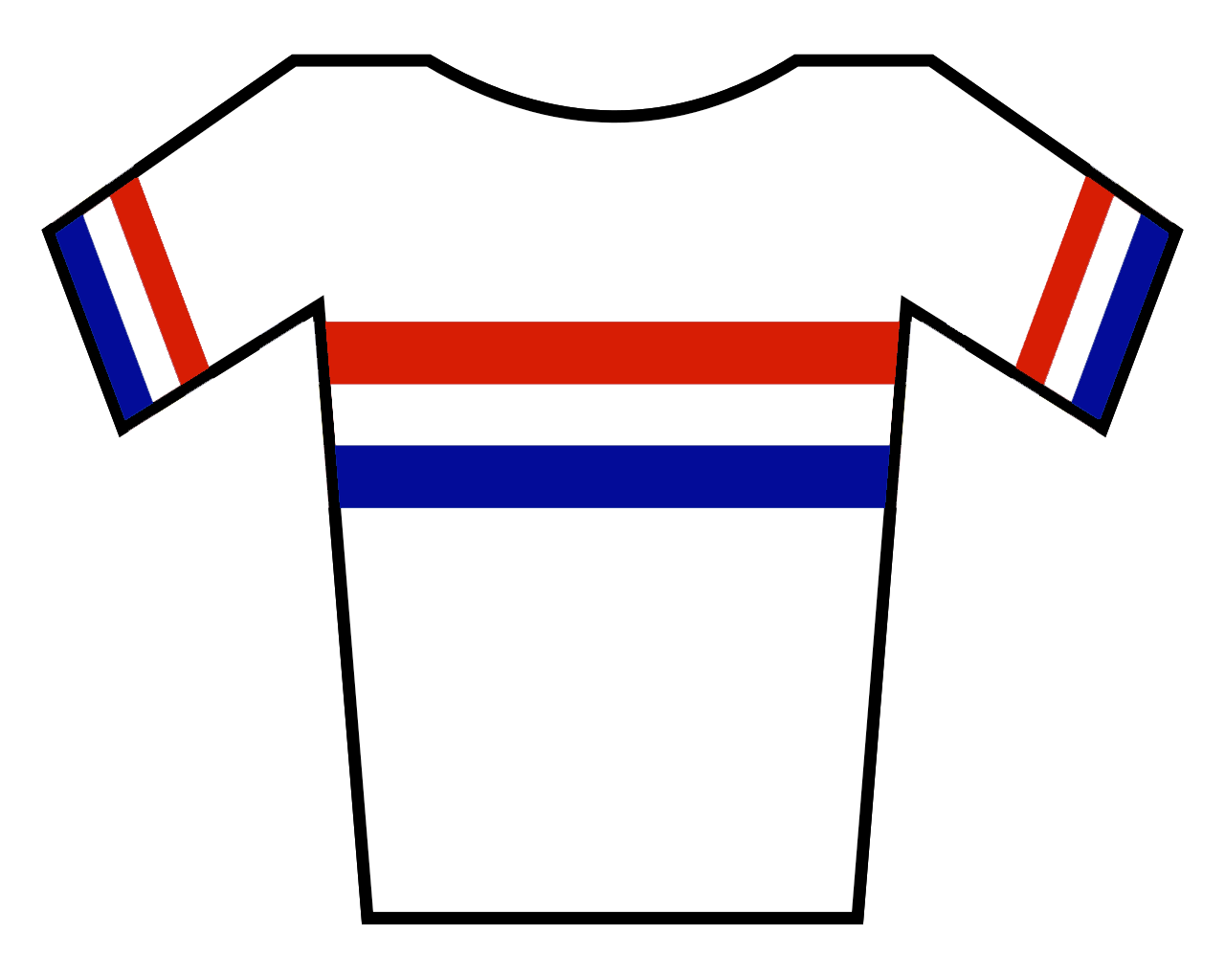
British
Champion

The winner of each national championship wears the national jersey in all their races for the next year in the respective discipline, apart from the World Championships and the Olympics, or unless they are wearing a category leader's jersey in a stage race. Most national champion jerseys tend to represent a country's flag or use the colours from it. Jerseys may also feature traditional sporting colours of a country that are not derived from a national flag, such as the green and gold on the jerseys of Australian national champions.

== 2016 champions ==
=== Men's Elite ===
Country	Men's Elite Road Race Champion	Road Race Champion's Team	Men's Elite Time Trial Champion	Time Trial Champion's Team
Albania	Eugert Zhupa	Wilier Triestina–Southeast	Eugert Zhupa	Wilier Triestina–Southeast
Antigua and Barbuda			Garfield Henry	
Argentina	Mauro Richeze	San Luis Somos Todos	Laureano Rosas	Sindicato de Empleados Publicos de San Juan
Australia	Jack Bobridge	Trek–Segafredo	Rohan Dennis	BMC Racing Team
Austria	Matthias Brändle	IAM Cycling	Matthias Brändle	IAM Cycling
Azerbaijan	Maksym Averin	Synergy Baku	Elchin Asadov	Synergy Baku
Belarus	Kanstantsin Siutsou	Team Dimension Data	Kanstantsin Siutsou	Team Dimension Data
Belgium	Philippe Gilbert	BMC Racing Team	Victor Campenaerts	LottoNL–Jumbo
Belize	Giovanni Lovell		Joel Adan Borland	
Bolivia	Óscar Soliz	Movistar Team América	Óscar Soliz	Movistar Team América
Bosnia and Herzegovina	Nedzad Mahmic			
Brazil	Flávio Cardoso	Funvic Soul Cycles–Carrefour	Rodrigo Nascimento	
Bulgaria	Georgi Petrov Georgiev		Alexander Alexiev	
Canada	Bruno Langlois	Garneau–Québecor	Ryan Roth	Silber Pro Cycling Team
Chile	Edison Bravo		José Luis Rodríguez Aguilar	
Colombia	Edwin Ávila	Team Illuminate	Walter Vargas	Liga de Antioquia
Democratic Republic of the Congo	Jimmy Kiaviro Mohindo		Gesack Lumingu	
Costa Rica			Juan Carlos Vicario Barbera	
Croatia	Radoslav Rogina		Matija Kvasina	Synergy Baku
Cyprus	Armanto Archimandritis		Andreas Miltiadis	
Czech Republic	Roman Kreuziger	Tinkoff	Leopold König	Team Sky
Denmark	Alexander Kamp	Stölting Service Group	Martin Toft Madsen	Team Almeborg–Bornholm
Dominican Republic	Juan José Cueto	Inteja–MMR Dominican Cycling Team	William Guzmán	Inteja–MMR Dominican Cycling Team
Ecuador	José Ragonessi		Jonathan Kléver Caicedo	
Egypt	Islam Ramadan			
Eritrea	Daniel Teklehaimanot	Team Dimension Data	Daniel Teklehaimanot	Team Dimension Data
Estonia	Mihkel Räim	Cycling Academy	Gert Jõeäär	Cofidis
Ethiopia			Yohanes Getachew	
Finland	Jesse Kaislavuo		Samuel Pökälä	
France	Arthur Vichot	FDJ	Thibaut Pinot	FDJ
Georgia	Giorgi Nareklishvili		Beka Nareklishvili	
Germany	André Greipel	Lotto–Soudal	Tony Martin	Etixx–Quick-Step
Ghana	Emanuel Sackey		Emanuel Sackey	
Greece	Ioannis Tamouridis	Synergy Baku	Ioannis Tamouridis	Synergy Baku
Guatemala			Manuel Rodas	
Hong Kong	King Lok Cheung	Orica–GreenEDGE	King Lok Cheung	Orica–GreenEDGE
Hungary	János Pelikán	Amplatz–BMC	János Pelikán	Amplatz–BMC
Iceland	Guðmundur Róbert Guðmundsson			
India	Manjeet Singh		Arvind Panwar	
Iran	Mehdi Sohrabi	Tabriz Shahrdari Team	Arvin Moazemi	Pishgaman–Giant
Ireland	Nicolas Roche	Team Sky	Nicolas Roche	Team Sky
Israel	Guy Sagiv	Cycling Academy	Aviv Yechezkel	Cycling Academy
Italy	Giacomo Nizzolo	Trek–Segafredo	Manuel Quinziato	BMC Racing Team
Jamaica			Andrew Ramsay	
Japan	Sho Hatsuyama	Bridgestone–Anchor	Ryota Nishizono	Bridgestone–Anchor
Kazakhstan	Arman Kamyshev	Astana	Dmitriy Gruzdev	Astana
Kosovo	Alban Delija		Alban Delija	
Kuwait	Abdulhadi Al Ajmi		Khaled Al Khalaifah	Massi–Kuwait Cycling Project
Latvia	Gatis Smukulis	Astana	Gatis Smukulis	Astana
Lebanon	Rachid Elias Abou		Kevork Altounian	
Lithuania	Ramūnas Navardauskas	Cannondale	Ignatas Konovalovas	FDJ
Luxembourg	Bob Jungels	Etixx–Quick-Step	Bob Jungels	Etixx–Quick-Step
Macedonia	Gorgi Popstefanov	Energi	Darko Simonovski	Energi
Mauritius	Jordan Lebon		Grégory Rougier-lagane	
Mali	Bréhima Diarra		Oumar Sangaré	
Malaysia	Mohd Zamri Saleh	Terengganu Cycling Team	Mohd Nor Umardi Rosdi	Terengganu Cycling Team
Mexico	Luis Lemus	Cycling Academy	Juan Pablo Magallanes	
Morocco			Soufiane Haddi	Skydive Dubai–Al Ahli
Namibia	Dan Craven	Cycling Academy	Till Drobisch	Christina Jewelry Pro Cycling
Netherlands	Dylan Groenewegen	LottoNL–Jumbo	Tom Dumoulin	Team Giant–Alpecin
New Zealand	Jason Christie	Kenyan Riders Downunder	Patrick Bevin	Cannondale
Norway	Edvald Boasson Hagen	Team Dimension Data	Edvald Boasson Hagen	Team Dimension Data
Paraguay	Samuel Coronel	Vivo Team Grupo Oresy		
Pakistan				
Poland	Rafał Majka	Tinkoff	Maciej Bodnar	Tinkoff
Portugal	José Mendes	Bora–Argon 18	Nelson Oliveira	Movistar Team
Puerto Rico			Juan Martínez	
Romania	Marius Petrache		Serghei Tvetcov	Androni Giocattoli–Sidermec
Russia	Pavel Kochetkov	Team Katusha	Sergei Chernetckii	Team Katusha
Rwanda	Bonaventure Uwizeyimana	Dimension Data for Qhubeka	Adrien Niyonshuti	Team Dimension Data
Serbia	Nikola Kozomara		Dušan Rajovic	
Singapore	Elyas Yusoff		Choon Huat Goh	Terengganu Cycling Team
Slovakia	Juraj Sagan	Tinkoff	Marek Čanecký	Amplatz–BMC
Slovenia	Jan Tratnik	Amplatz–BMC	Primož Roglič	LottoNL–Jumbo
South Africa	Jaco Venter	Team Dimension Data	Daryl Impey	Orica–GreenEDGE
South Korea	Hyo Suk Gong		Hyeong Min Choe	Geumsan Insam Cello
Spain	José Joaquín Rojas	Movistar Team	Ion Izagirre	Movistar Team
Eswatini	Sicelo Phiri			
Sweden	Richard Larsen	Team Tre Berg–Bianchi	Alexander Wetterhall	Team Tre Berg–Bianchi
Switzerland	Jonathan Fumeaux	IAM Cycling	Fabian Cancellara	Trek–Segafredo
Tunisia	Alí Nouisri		Maher Hasnaoui	Skydive Dubai–Al Ahli
Turkey	Onur Balkan	Brisaspor	Ahmet Örken	Torku Şekerspor
Ukraine	Oleksandr Polivoda	Kolss BDC Team	Andriy Vasylyuk	Kolss BDC Team
United Arab Emirates	Yousif Mirza	Al Nasr Pro Cycling Team–Dubai	Yousif Mirza	Al Nasr Pro Cycling Team–Dubai
Uruguay	Nicolás Arachichú de Armas		Agustín Moreira	
United Kingdom	Adam Blythe	Tinkoff	Alex Dowsett	Movistar Team
United States	Gregory Daniel	Axeon–Hagens Berman	Taylor Phinney	BMC Racing Team
Venezuela	Gusneiver Gil		Pedro Gutiérrez	

=== Champions in UCI WorldTeams ===
Team	Road Race Champions	Time Trial Champions
AG2R La Mondiale		
Astana	Arman Kamyshev (KAZ); Gatis Smukulis (LAT)	Dmitriy Gruzdev (KAZ); Gatis Smukulis (LAT)
BMC Racing Team	Philippe Gilbert (BEL)	Rohan Dennis (AUS); Manuel Quinziato (ITA); Taylor Phinney (USA)
Cannondale–Drapac	Ramūnas Navardauskas (LTU)	Patrick Bevin (NZL)
Team Dimension Data	Kanstantsin Siutsou (BLR); Daniel Teklehaimanot (ERI); Edvald Boasson Hagen (NOR); Jaco Venter (RSA)	Kanstantsin Siutsou (BLR); Daniel Teklehaimanot (ERI); Edvald Boasson Hagen (NOR); Adrien Niyonshuti (RWA)
Etixx–Quick-Step	Bob Jungels (LUX)	Tony Martin (GER); Bob Jungels (LUX)
FDJ	Arthur Vichot (FRA)	Thibaut Pinot (FRA); Ignatas Konovalovas (LTU)
IAM Cycling	Matthias Brändle (AUT); Jonathan Fumeaux (SUI)	Matthias Brändle (AUT)
Lampre–Merida		
Lotto–Soudal	André Greipel (GER)	
Movistar Team	José Joaquín Rojas (ESP)	Jon Izagirre (ESP); Alex Dowsett (GBR); Nelson Oliveira (POR)
Orica–BikeExchange	Cheung King Lok (HKG)	Cheung King Lok (HKG); Daryl Impey (RSA)
Team Giant–Alpecin		Tom Dumoulin (NED)
Team Katusha	Pavel Kochetkov (RUS)	Sergey Chernetskiy (RUS)
LottoNL–Jumbo	Dylan Groenewegen (NED)	Victor Campenaerts (BEL); Primož Roglič (SLO)
Team Sky	Nicolas Roche (IRE)	Leopold König (CZE); Nicolas Roche (IRE)
Tinkoff	Roman Kreuziger (CZE); Adam Blythe (GBR); Rafał Majka (POL); Juraj Sagan (SVK)	Maciej Bodnar (POL)
Trek–Segafredo	Jack Bobridge (AUS); Giacomo Nizzolo (ITA)	Fabian Cancellara (SUI)

=== Women's Elite ===
Country	Women's Elite Road Race Champion	Road Race Champion's Team	Women's Elite Time Trial Champion	Time Trial Champion's Team
Antigua and Barbuda			Tamiko Butler	
Argentina	Maria Carla Alvarez	Xirayas de San Luis–OPW	Estefania Pilz	Xirayas de San Luis–OPW
Australia	Amanda Spratt	Orica–AIS	Katrin Garfoot	Orica–AIS
Austria	Christina Perchtold	Vitalogic Astrokalb Radunion NÖ	Martina Ritter	BTC City Ljubljana
Azerbaijan	Olena Pavlukhina	BTC City Ljubljana	Olena Pavlukhina	BTC City Ljubljana
Belarus	Tatsiana Sharakova		Tatsiana Sharakova	
Belgium	Kaat Hannes	Lensworld–Zannata	Ann-Sophie Duyck	Topsport Vlaanderen–Etixx–Guill D'or
Belize	Kaya Cattouse		Alicia Thompson	
Bolivia	Yeneth Amurrio		Sharon Sarabia	
Brazil	Clemilda Fernandes		Clemilda Fernandes	
Canada	Annie Foreman-Mackey	The Cyclery-Opus		
Czech Republic	Martina Sáblíková		Martina Sáblíková	
Chile	Karla Vallejos		Aranza Villalon Sánchez	Weber Shimano Ladies Power
Colombia	Luz Adriana Tovar		Ana Sanabria	
Costa Rica	Marcela Rubiano		Milagro Mena	
Croatia	Mia Radotić		Mia Radotić	
Cyprus	Antri Christoforou		Antri Christoforou	
Czech Republic	Martina Sáblíková		Martina Sáblíková	
Denmark	Emma Cecilie Norsgaard		Cecilie Uttrup Ludwig	Team BMS BIRN
Dominican Republic	Cesarina Ballenilla	Team Caribe	Natasha Méndez	La Caya
El Salvador	Xenia Estrada		Ana Lucrecia Figueroa	
Eritrea	Yohana Dawit		Mossana Debesay	
Estonia	Kelly Kalm		Liisi Rist	
Ethiopia	Selam Amha		Eyerusalem Kelil	S.C. Michela Fanini Rox
Finland	Lotta Lepistö	Cervélo–Bigla Pro Cycling	Lotta Lepistö	Cervélo–Bigla Pro Cycling
France	Edwige Pitel	S.C. Michela Fanini Rox	Audrey Cordon	Wiggle High5
Germany	Mieke Kröger	Canyon//SRAM	Trixi Worrack	Canyon//SRAM
Greece	Varvara Fasoi		Michali Tsavari Eleni	
Guatemala	Cintia Lee		Andrea Guillén	
Hong Kong	Zhao Juan Meng		Qianyu Yang	
Hungary	Mónika Király	S.C. Michela Fanini Rox	Mónika Király	S.C. Michela Fanini Rox
Iceland	Evgenia Ilyinskaya			
India	Lidiyamol Sunny		Rutuja Satpute	
Ireland	Lydia Boylan		Anna Turvey	
Italy	Elena Cecchini	Canyon//SRAM	Elisa Longo Borghini	Wiggle High5
Israel	Miriam Bar-on		Paz Bash	
Japan	Eri Yonamine	Hagens Berman–Supermint	Eri Yonamine	Hagens Berman–Supermint
Kazakhstan	Natalya Saifutdinova	Astana	Yekaterina Yuraitis	Astana
Kuwait	Najla Aljuraiwi		Najla Aljuraiwi	
Latvia	Lija Laizāne	Servetto Footon	Lija Laizāne	Servetto Footon
Lithuania	Daiva Tušlaitė	Inpa–Bianchi	Aušrinė Trebaitė	
Luxembourg	Christine Majerus	Boels–Dolmans	Christine Majerus	Boels–Dolmans
Macedonia			Anyeta Antovska	
Malaysia	Nurul Alissa Mohamad		Grace Phang	
Mexico	Ana María Hernández		Verónica Leal	
Namibia	Vera Adrian		Vera Adrian	
Netherlands	Anouska Koster	Rabobank-Liv Woman Cycling Team	Annemiek van Vleuten	Orica–AIS
Norway	Vita Heine	Team Hitec Products	Vita Heine	Team Hitec Products
New Zealand	Rushlee Buchanan	UnitedHealthcare	Rushlee Buchanan	UnitedHealthcare
Paraguay			Agua Marina Espinola	
Poland	Katarzyna Niewiadoma	Rabobank-Liv Woman Cycling Team	Katarzyna Niewiadoma	Rabobank-Liv Woman Cycling Team
Portugal	Daniela Reis		Daniela Reis	
Puerto Rico			Marisol Tellado	
Romania	Ana Covrig	Inpa–Bianchi	Ana Covrig	Inpa–Bianchi
Russia	Natalia Boyarskaya		Tatiana Antoshina	Astana
Rwanda	Jeanne D'arc Girubuntu		Jeanne D'arc Girubuntu	
Serbia	Jelena Erić	BTC City Ljubljana	Jelena Erić	BTC City Ljubljana
Singapore	Yi Wei Luo		Dinah Chan	
Slovakia	Janka Števková		Lucia Valachová	Vitalogic Astrokalb Radunion NÖ
Slovenia	Polona Batagelj		Urša Pintar	BTC City Ljubljana
South Africa	An-Li Kachelhoffer	Lotto–Soudal Ladies	Juanita Venter	
South Korea	Ju Mi Lee		Ju Mi Lee	
Spain	Margarita Victoria García	Bizkaia–Durango	Anna Sanchis	Wiggle High5
Eswatini	Linda Löffler			
Sweden	Emma Johansson	Wiggle High5	Emma Johansson	Wiggle High5
Switzerland	Doris Schweizer	Cylance Pro Cycling	Doris Schweizer	Cylance Pro Cycling
Tunisia	Nour Dissem			
Turkey	Cansu Türkmenoğlu	Brisaspor	Cansu Türkmenoğlu	Brisaspor
Ukraine	Yevgenia Vysotska	Hagens Berman–Supermint	Yevgenia Vysotska	Hagens Berman–Supermint
United Kingdom	Hannah Barnes	Canyon//SRAM	Hayley Simmonds	UnitedHealthcare
United States	Megan Guarnier	Boels–Dolmans	Carmen Small	Cervélo–Bigla Pro Cycling
Venezuela	Zuralmy Rivas		Danielys Del Valle García	

=== Champions in UCI Women's World Tour Teams ===
Team (Note: These are the Top-20 teams which are automatically invited to Women's World Tour events.)	Road Race Champions	Time Trial Champions
Alé–Cipollini		
Astana	Natalya Saifutdinova (KAZ)	Yekaterina Yuraitis (KAZ); Tatiana Antoshina (RUS)
Bepink		
Boels–Dolmans	Megan Guarnier (USA); Christine Majerus (LUX)	Christine Majerus (LUX)
BTC City Ljubljana	Olena Pavlukhina (AZE)	Olena Pavlukhina (AZE); Urša Pintar (SLO); Martina Ritter (AUT); Jelena Erić (SRB)
Canyon//SRAM	Elena Cecchini (ITA); Mieke Kröger (GER); Hannah Barnes (GBR)	Trixi Worrack (GER)
Cervélo–Bigla Pro Cycling		Carmen Small (USA); Lotta Lepistö (FIN)
Cylance Pro Cycling	Doris Schweizer (SUI)	Doris Schweizer (SUI)
Team Hitec Products	Vita Heine (NOR)	Vita Heine (NOR)
Lensworld–Zannata	Kaat Hannes (BEL)	
Lotto–Soudal Ladies	An-Li Kachelhoffer (RSA)	
Orica–AIS	Amanda Spratt (AUS)	Katrin Garfoot (AUS); Annemiek van Vleuten (NED)
Parkhotel Valkenburg Continental Team		
Poitou-Charentes.Futuroscope.86		
Rabobank-Liv Woman Cycling Team	Anouska Koster (NED); Katarzyna Niewiadoma (POL)	Katarzyna Niewiadoma (POL)
Team Liv–Plantur		
Tibco–Silicon Valley Bank		
Topsport Vlaanderen–Etixx–Guill D'or		Ann-Sophie Duyck (BEL)
UnitedHealthcare	Rushlee Buchanan (NZL)	Rushlee Buchanan (NZL); Hayley Simmonds (GBR)
Wiggle High5	Emma Johansson (SWE)	Audrey Cordon (FRA); Elisa Longo Borghini (ITA); Anna Sanchis (ESP); Emma Johansson (SWE)

=== Criterium championships ===
Country	Men's Elite Champion	Champion's Team	Women's Elite Champion	Champion's Team
Austria	Lukas Schlemmer	WSA–Greenlife		
Australia	Caleb Ewan	Orica–GreenEDGE	Sophie MacKay	
Estonia	Karlo Aia	Jilun–Shakeland Team	Liisi Rist	Keukens Redant
Ireland	Mark Dowling			
New Zealand	Regan Gough	Avanti IsoWhey Sports	Racquel Sheath	
Russia	Alexander Zdanov			
Serbia	Miloš Borisavljević			
United States	Brad Huff	Rally Cycling	Lauren Tamayo	UnitedHealthcare
Ukraine				

== See also ==
- 2016 in men's road cycling
- 2016 in women's road cycling
