= Abdelbasset Hannachi =

Algerian cyclist (born 1985)

Personal information
- Full name: Abdelbasset Hannachi
- Born: February 2, 1985 (age 41) Algeria

Cycling career
- Sport: Cycling
- Current team: Retired
- Discipline: Road
- Role: Rider

Amateur team
- 2010: Medsceme

Professional teams
- 2008–2009: Doha Team
- 2011: Test Team Raiko–Argon 18
- 2012–2015: Groupement Sportif Pétrolier Algérie
- 2016: Sharjah Team

Abdelbasset Hannachi (born February 2, 1985) is an Algerian former professional cyclist.

== Major results ==
2003
1st Road race, Arab Road Championships
2006
1st Road race, Arab Road Championships
2007
1st Stage 5 Tour des Aéroports
2008
1st International Grand Prix Losail
2nd International Grand Prix Messaeed
4th International Grand Prix Al-Khor
6th Overall Cycling Golden Jersey
9th Time trial, African Road Championships
2009
1st Road race, Arab Road Championships
1st Stage 2 International Presidency Tour
1st Stage 3 Tour de East Java
1st Stage 1 Tour des Aéroports
2nd H. H. Vice-President's Cup
2nd Emirates Cup
2010
Challenge du Prince

2nd Trophée Princier
10th Trophée de l'Anniversaire

2nd Challenge Spécial Ramadan
2nd Grand Prix of Al Fatah
9th Overall Tour of Libya

1st Stages 1 & 2

10th Vice President Cup
2011
3rd Team time trial, All-Africa Games
4th Road race, African Road Championships
2012
1st Stage 2 Tour of Oran
3rd Challenge Youssoufia, Challenge des phosphates
10th Jūrmala Grand Prix
2013
1st Stage 1 Tour de Chlef
1st Stage 2 Fenkil Northern Red Sea Challenge
1st Stage 3 Tour of Eritrea
1st Stage 3 Tour d'Algérie
1st Stage 2 Tour de Tipaza
3rd Road race, Mediterranean Games
6th Overall Sharjah International Cycling Tour

1st Points classification
1st Mountains classification

10th Overall Tour du Faso

1st Points classification
1st Stages 5 & 10

10th Circuit d'Alger
2014
1st Road race, National Road Championships
1st Stage 6 Tour du Maroc
2015
1st Overall Tour d'Annaba

1st Stages 2 & 3

1st Critérium International de Blida
2nd Critérium International de Sétif
2016
3rd Critérium International de Sétif
6th GP de la Ville d'Oran
8th Critérium International d'Alger
