= Rafaâ Chtioui =

Tunisian cyclist (born 1986)

Rafaa Chtioui
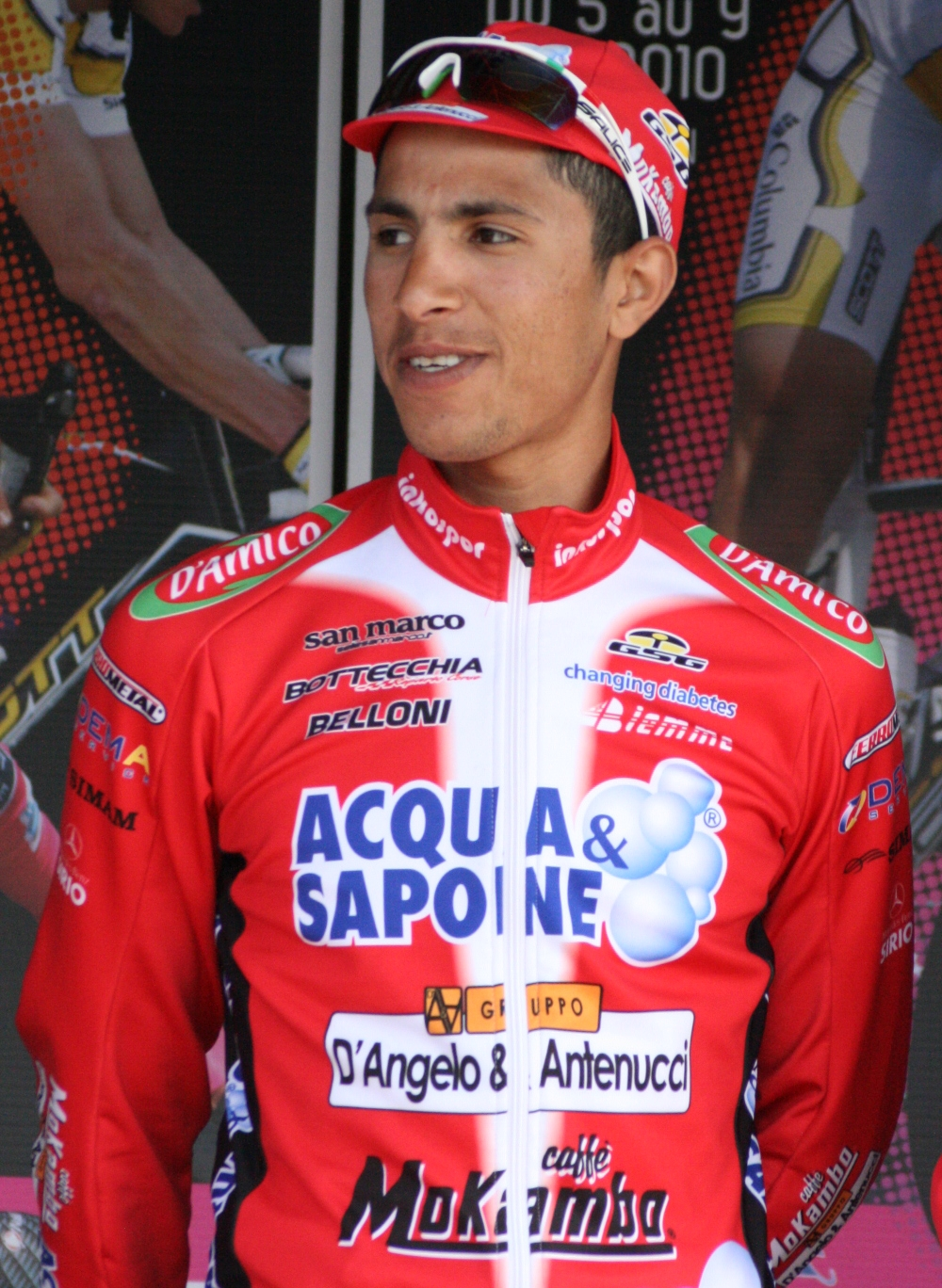

Personal information
- Full name: Rafaa Chtioui
- Born: 26 January 1986 (age 40) Tunisia
- Height: 1.90 m (6 ft 3 in)
- Weight: 82 kg (181 lb)

Cycling career
- Sport: Cycling
- Discipline: Road
- Role: Rider

Professional teams
- 2008–2009: Doha Team
- 2010–2011: Acqua & Sapone
- 2012: Team Europcar
- 2014–2016: Skydive Dubai Pro Cycling
- 2018–2019: VIB Sports

Major wins
- Stage races La Tropicale Amissa Bongo (2015) One-day races National Road Race Championships (2010, 2013–2015) National Time Trial Championships (2013, 2015)
Medal record
Representing Tunisia
Men's Road Cycling
CAC Road African Championships
| Silver medal – second place | 2012 Ouagadugou | Team Time Trial |

Rafaâ Chtioui (born 26 January 1986) is a Tunisian road bicycle racer who last rode for UCI Continental team VIB Sports.

As a junior in 2004, Chtioui finished second in the junior road race world championships. He was beaten by Roman Kreuziger in a two-man sprint after Chtioui established a breakaway on the final descent of the race.

Chtioui represented his country at the 2008 Summer Olympics in the Road Race, ultimately finishing in 87th place.

From 2014 to 2016, Chtioui competed for UCI Continental squad Skydive Dubai–Al Ahli. That year he won a stage and the overall victory at the Jelajah Malaysia, as well as winning the Tunisian national road race championships. In 2015, he won his biggest victories to date by winning the general classification as well as the first and second stages of the La Tropicale Amissa Bongo, a UCI 2.1-ranked race.

== Major results ==
2004
2nd Road race, UCI Junior Road World Championships
2005
2nd Time trial, African Road Championships
Mediterranean Games

7th Road race
8th Time trial

2006
1st Stage 3 Tour du Maroc
7th Time trial, African Road Championships
2007
1st Time trial, Arab Road Championships
1st Time trial, Pan Arab Games
1st Stage 3 Tour des Pays de Savoie
1st Stage 5 (ITT) Tour de l'Avenir
4th Overall Tour d'Egypte

1st Stage 1

6th Overall Tour du Maroc

1st Stage 4

6th Overall Tour des Aéroports

1st Stage 3

2008
1st International Grand Prix Al-Khor
6th Overall Tour d'Egypte
7th International Grand Prix Messaeed
8th La Côte Picarde
9th International Grand Prix Losail
2009
1st Time trial, Arab Road Championships
1st Stage 2 Tour de Singkarak
1st Stage 5 Tour de Serbie
4th H.H. Vice President Cup
5th Overall Tour de East Java
6th Overall Jelajah Malaysia
10th Overall International Presidency Tour
2010
1st Road race, National Road Championships
8th Gran Premio Città di Misano – Adriatico
2011
1st Time trial, Pan Arab Games
2012
African Road Championships

2nd Team time trial
6th Time trial

2nd La Roue Tourangelle
3rd Overall Ronde de l'Oise
10th Volta Limburg Classic
2013
National Road Championships

1st Road race
1st Time trial

Challenge du Prince

1st Trophée de l'Anniversaire
2nd Trophée Princier

2014
1st Road race, National Road Championships
1st Overall Jelajah Malaysia

1st Stage 1

2015
National Road Championships

1st Road race
1st Time trial

1st Overall La Tropicale Amissa Bongo

1st Stages 1 & 2

1st Stage 2 Tour of Japan
1st Stage 4 Tour of Taihu Lake
4th Time trial, African Games
4th Overall Sharjah International Cycling Tour
African Road Championships

6th Time trial
10th Road race

10th Overall Tour d'Egypte
