= Abdelatif Saadoune =

Moroccan cyclist

Personal information
- Born: 1 January 1976 (age 50) Morocco

Cycling career
- Sport: Cycling
- Current team: Retired
- Discipline: Road
- Role: Rider

Professional team
- 2015: Al Marakeb

Abdelatif Saadoune (born 1 January 1976) is a Moroccan former racing cyclist. He rode at the 2014 UCI Road World Championships.

== Major results ==
2001
2nd Overall Tour du Faso
2002
1st Overall Tour du Faso

1st Stage 1

2003
1st Stage 9 Tour d'Algérie
2nd Overall Tour du Sénégal
2004
4th Overall Tour du Maroc
2006
1st Road race, National Road Championships
Tour du Faso

1st Stages 2 & 10

5th Overall Tour du Maroc
2007
2nd Road race, National Road Championships
2nd Overall Tour du Sénégal
5th Overall Tour du Faso
8th Overall Tour du Maroc
2009
1st Overall Tour du Faso
1st Overall Tour des Aéroports
2nd Road race, National Road Championships
2nd Overall Tour of Rwanda

1st Stages 4 & 6

African Road Championships

5th Road race
5th Time trial

8th Overall Tour of Eritrea
2010
1st 2009–10 UCI Africa Tour
Les Challenges de la Marche Verte

1st GP Oued Eddahab
2nd Grand Prix Al Massira
8th GP Sakia El Hamra

1st Stage 5 Tour des Aéroports
National Road Championships

2nd Road race
2nd Time trial

Challenge du Prince

3rd Trophée de la Maison Royale
7th Trophée de l'Anniversaire

4th Overall Tour du Mali

1st Prologue & Stage 5

10th Road race, African Road Championships
2011
1st Team time trial, Pan Arab Games (with Mouhssine Lahsaini, Ismaïl Ayoune and Adil Jelloul)
National Road Championships

2nd Time trial
3rd Road race

3rd Team time trial, African Road Championships
2012
Challenge du Prince

1st Trophée de la Maison Royale
6th Trophée Princier
8th Trophée de l'Anniversaire

Les Challenges de la Marche Verte

2nd Grand Prix Sakia El Hamra
8th Grand Prix Al Massira

National Road Championships

2nd Road race
3rd Time trial

Challenge des phosphates

6th Challenge Ben Guerir
7th Challenge Youssoufia

7th Overall Tour du Maroc
2013
1st Road race, National Road Championships
3rd Trophée Princier, Challenge du Prince
2014
Challenge du Prince

1st Trophée Princier
5th Trophée de la Maison Royale
10th Trophée de l'Anniversaire

Les Challenges de la Marche Verte

2nd GP Oued Eddahab
5th Grand Prix Sakia El Hamra
7th Grand Prix Al Massira

2015
Les Challenges de la Marche Verte

1st Grand Prix Al Massira
3rd Grand Prix Sakia El Hamra
7th GP Oued Eddahab

Challenge des phosphates

1st Grand Prix de Youssoufia
5th Grand Prix de Khouribga

Challenge du Prince

3rd Trophée de la Maison Royale
4th Trophée de l'Anniversaire
7th Trophée Princier

4th Overall Tour de Côte d'Ivoire
7th Circuit d'Alger
8th Overall Tour du Faso
8th UAE Cup
2016
Challenge du Prince

6th Trophée de la Maison Royale
7th Trophée de l'Anniversaire

7th Overall Tour du Cameroun

1st Stage 2
