= Hassen Ben Nasser =

Tunisian cyclist

Personal information
- Born: 16 December 1986 (age 39) Tunisia

Cycling career
- Sport: Cycling
- Discipline: Road
- Role: Rider

Amateur team
- 2018–2019: ASPCT

Professional team
- 2013: Vélo Club Sovac

Major wins
- National Road Race Championships (2008, 2012, 2019); National Time Trial Championships (2012, 2014)

Hassen Ben Nasser (born 16 December 1986) is a Tunisian racing cyclist. He rode at the 2013 UCI Road World Championships.

== Major results ==
2005
3rd Road race, National Road Championships
2006
1st Overall Tour des Aéroports

1st Points classification
1st Young rider classification
1st Stages 5 & 8

7th Overall Tour du Maroc
10th Road race, African Road Championships
2007
3rd Road race, National Road Championships
3rd Overall Tour of Libya
5th Grand Prix de la ville de Tunis
7th Overall Tour des Aéroports

1st Stages 4 & 7

2008
1st Road race, National Road Championships
2nd Overall Tour de la Pharmacie Centrale

1st Stages 6 & 7a

5th Overall Tour of Libya
2009
8th Overall Tour d'Egypte
8th Grand Prix of Sharm el-Sheikh
2011
3rd Road race, National Road Championships
2012
National Road Championships

1st Time trial
1st Road race

2013
3rd Time trial, National Road Championships
6th Road race, African Road Championships
2014
1st Time trial, National Road Championships
2015
3rd Time trial, National Road Championships
2016
3rd Time trial, National Road Championships
8th Overall Tour de Tunisie
2017
National Road Championships

3rd Road race
3rd Time trial

10th Overall Tour de Tunisie
2018
3rd Road race, National Road Championships
2019
National Road Championships

1st Road race
2nd Time trial
