= Yousif Mirza =

Emirati cyclist (born 1988)

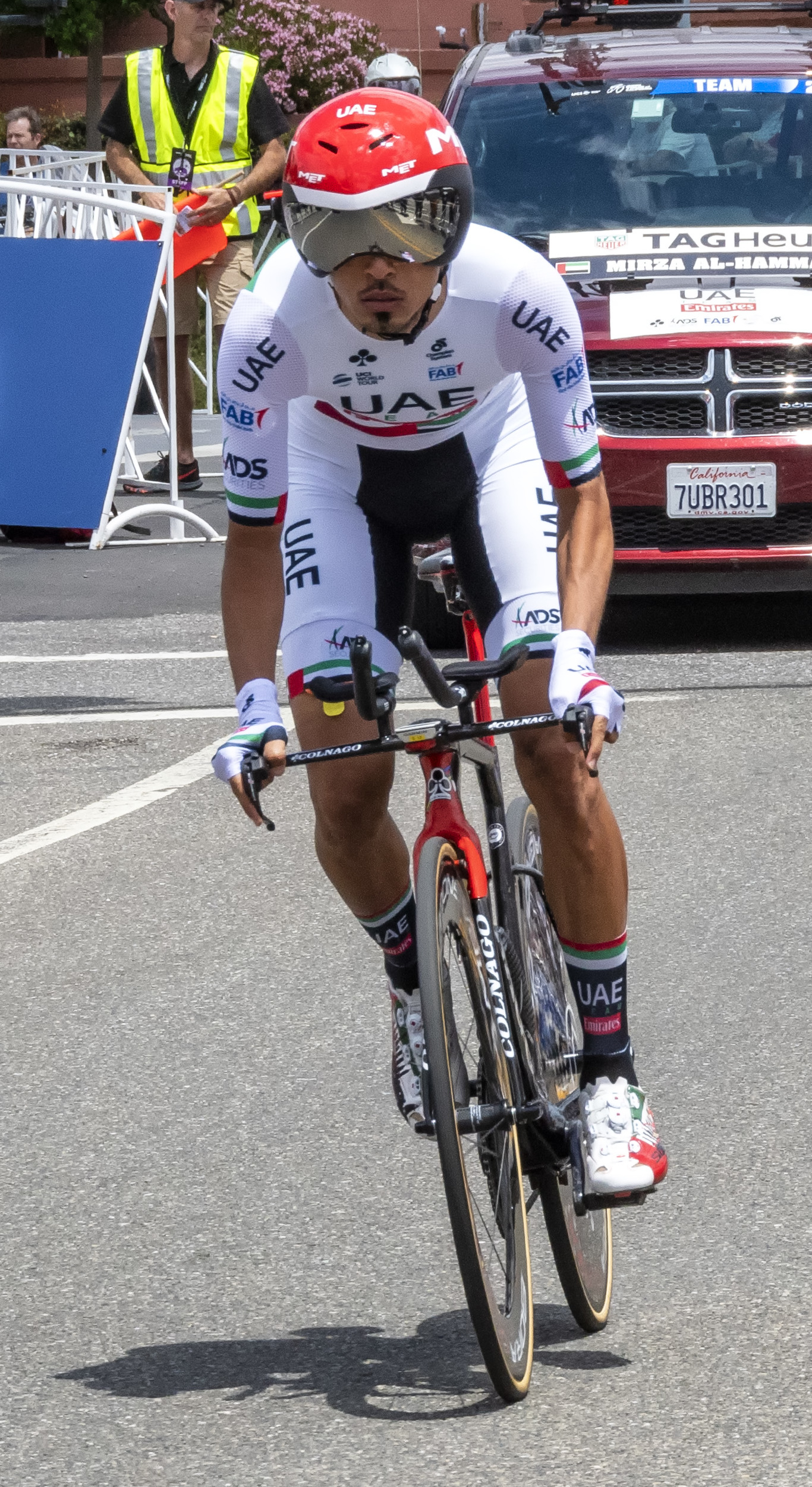
- Mirza at the 2018 Tour of California

Personal information
- Full name: Yousif Mohamed Ahmed Mirza Al-Hammadi
- Born: 8 October 1988 (age 38) Khorfakkan, United Arab Emirates
- Height: 176 cm (5 ft 9 in)
- Weight: 63 kg (139 lb)

Cycling career
- Sport: Cycling
- Current team: Retired
- Disciplines: Road; Track
- Role: Rider
- Rider type: All-rounder

Professional teams
- 2009: Doha Team
- 2016: Al Nasr Pro Cycling Team–Dubai
- 2017–2022: UAE Abu Dhabi

Major wins
- One-day races and Classics National Road Race Championships (2010, 2013–2019, 2021–2022) National Time Trial Championships (2011, 2012, 2014, 2016–2022)
Medal record
Representing United Arab Emirates
Men's cycling
Asian Championships
Gold medal – first place	2018 Naypyidaw	Road race
Gold medal – first place	2018 Nilai	Points race
Gold medal – first place	2022 New Delhi	Points race
Silver medal – second place	2015 Nakhon Ratchasima	Road race
Silver medal – second place	2015 Nakhon Ratchasima	Points race
Silver medal – second place	2017 Manama	Road race
Silver medal – second place	2018 Nilai	Omnium
Silver medal – second place	2019 Jakarta	Omnium
Bronze medal – third place	2017 New Delhi	Points race
Asian Indoor and Martial Arts Games
Bronze medal – third place	2017 Ashgabat	Omnium
Islamic Solidarity Games
Gold medal – first place	2021 Konya	Points race
Bronze medal – third place	2021 Konya	Road race

Yousif Mohamed Ahmed Mirza Al-Hammadi (Arabic: يوسف محمد احمد ميرزا الحمادي) (born 8 October 1988) is an Emirati former racing cyclist, who competed as a professional for UCI WorldTeam UAE Team Emirates from 2017 to 2022.

Mirza has won multiple Emirati national titles as well as winning the silver medal in the road race at the 2015 Asian Cycling Championships, qualifying him for the 2016 Summer Olympics in Brazil. He was the first Emirati cyclist to compete in the Olympic road race. After his team Al Nasr Pro Cycling Team–Dubai disbanded at the end of the 2016 season, he joined the UAE Abu Dhabi team for 2017, becoming the first Emirati to ride for a UCI WorldTeam.

His older brother, Badr, also competed as a professional road cyclist.

== Major results ==
=== Road ===
2008
2nd Overall UAE International Emirates Post Tour
3rd Time trial, Arab Gulf Cycling Championships
National Road Championships

3rd Road race
3rd Time trial

3rd President's Cup Ras al Khaima
2009
1st Team time trial, Arab Gulf Cycling Championships
2nd Road race, National Road Championships
3rd Road race, Arab Road Championships
3rd Overall Tour of the AGCC Arab Gulf

1st Stage 5

3rd Sharjah Chrono
2010
1st Road race, National Road Championships
1st United Arab Emirates Season Opener
2nd Sharjah Chrono
Arab Gulf Cycling Championships

3rd Road race
5th Time trial

3rd Overall Tour of the AGCC Arab Gulf

1st Stages 1, 3 & 5

3rd Bakhan Chrono
3rd Vice President Cup
4th President's Cup Ras al Khaima
10th Road race, Asian Road Championships
2011
Arab Road Championships

1st Road race
1st Time trial

National Road Championships

1st Time trial
4th Road race

1st Overall UAE International Emirates Post Tour

1st Stage 1

1st Sharjah Chrono
Tour of the AGCC Arab Gulf

1st Stages 7 & 8

2nd Time trial, Arab Club Cycling Championships
2nd President's Cup Ras al Khaima
3rd Road race, GCC Games
5th Road race, Pan Arab Games
2012
1st Time trial, Arab Gulf Cycling Championships
National Road Championships

1st Time trial
2nd Road race

1st Overall Tour of Sharjah

1st Stages 1 & 2

1st Overall Tour of the AGCC Arab Gulf

1st Stage 2

1st Al Khan (Sharjah)
1st Stage 3 Tour de Ijen
2013
National Road Championships

1st Road race
2nd Time trial

1st Overall Tour of Al Zubarah

1st Points classification
1st Stages 1 & 2

Challenge du Prince

3rd Trophée de l'Anniversaire
6th Trophée Princier

4th Overall Sharjah International Cycling Tour

1st Stage 2

2014
National Road Championships

1st Road race
1st Time trial

1st Overall Sharjah International Cycling Tour

1st Points classification
1st Stage 1

Tour of Al Zubarah

1st Points classification
1st Stages 2 & 3

4th Road race, Asian Games
10th Overall Tour d'Algérie

1st Mountains classification

2015
National Road Championships

1st Road race
3rd Time trial

2nd Road race, Asian Road Championships
4th Overall Tour d'Egypte
2016
National Road Championships

1st Road race
1st Time trial

4th Overall Tour de Tunisie

1st Stage 1

2017
National Road Championships

1st Road race
1st Time trial

2nd Road race, Asian Road Championships
2018
1st Road race, Asian Road Championships
National Road Championships

1st Road race
1st Time trial

2019
National Road Championships

1st Road race
1st Time trial

2nd Overall Tour d'Egypte

1st Stage 5

2021
National Road Championships

1st Road race
1st Time trial

2022
National Road Championships

1st Road race
1st Time trial

Asian Road Cycling Championships

4th Time trial
7th Road race

=== Track ===
2011
3rd Points race, Arab Track Championships
2013
Arab Track Championships

1st Scratch race
1st Team pursuit
2nd Omnium
2nd Points race

2015
2nd Points race, Asian Track Championships
2017
3rd Points race, Asian Track Championships
3rd Omnium, Asian Indoor and Martial Arts Games
2018
Asian Track Championships

1st Points race
2nd Omnium

2019
2nd Omnium, Asian Track Championships
2022
1st Points race, Islamic Solidarity Games
1st Points race, Asian Track Championships
