= Tunisian National Road Championships =

National road cycling championships in Tunisia

This is a list of results for Tunisian National Road Championships

== Men ==
=== Road race ===
Year	Winner	Second	Third
1956	Santo Caracci	Mhammed Touati	Hamadi Belouahchia
1957	Mustapha Trifi	Mhammed Touati	Mehrez Abdelkader
1958	Mhammed Touati	Nicolas Castellano	Hamadi Belouahchia
1959	Mohamed Ben Abda	Mhammed Touati	Diego Tilotta
1960	Mhammed Touati	Mohamed Ben Abda	Antonio Merlino
1961	Mohamed Ben Abda	Béchir Merdassi	Joseph Migliore
1962	Mohamed Bahloul	Ahmed Ben Moussa	Eugène Sorrentino
1963	Hammadi Dridi	Ahmed Brika	Khemaïs Ben Ammar
1964	Hammadi Dridi	Ahmed Ben Moussa	Mhammed Touati
1965	Hammadi Dridi	Hassen Khayati	Hechmi Ben Salah
1966	Ahmed Brika	Hammadi Dridi	Khemaïs Ben Ammar
1967	Hammadi Dridi	Abderrahman Neffati	Ahmed Brika
1968	Ferjani Louati	Hammadi Dridi	Khemaïs Ben Ammar
1969	Hammadi Dridi	Ferjani Louati	Béchir Hamdi
1970	Ferjani Louati	Messaoud Trabelsi	Hammadi Dridi
1971	Ferjani Louati	Hammadi Dridi	Messaoud Trabelsi
1972	Hassen Khayati	Ferjani Louati	Abdesselem Jarbouai
1973	Abderrazak Hajri	Taïeb Hfaiedh	Ferjani Louati
1974	Ferjani Louati	Sadok Aouadi	Hassen Khayati
1975	Hassen Khayati	Ferjani Louati	Mahmoud Ben Saad
1976	Béchir Hamdi	Mehrez Amami	?
1977	Ferjani Louati	?	?
1978	Mohamed Sannan	?	?
1979	Samir Merdassi	Slah Brachen	Ayech Rezgui
1980	Samir Merdassi	Zouhair Barka	Mongi Arbi
1981	No race	-	-
1982	Adel Cherigui	?	?
1983	Zouhair Barka	Adel Cherigui	Salah Aissaoui
1984	Zouhair Barka	Adel Bejaoui	Kamel Merdassi
1985	Samir Merdassi	Sami Essid	Zouhair Barka
1986	Samir Merdassi	?	?
1987	Mohamed Yazidi	Samir Souissi	Hatem Denguir
1988	Lamjed Belkadhi	Salah Hamdi	Ferid Amdouni
1989	Mohamed Yazidi	Hamel Ben Mohamed	Samir Souissi
1990	Tayachi Fradj	Houcine Belouahchia	Hassen Belouahchia
1991	?	?	?
1992	Houcine Belouahchia	Mounir Boujrida	Hassen Belouahchia
1993	Mehrez Khelifi (Balha)	Lamjed Belkadhi	Mohamed Mliki (Essouiss)
1994	Moustapha Yazidi	Nizar Mousli	Abandon du reste du peloton
1995	Houcine Belouahchia	Mehrez Khelifi (Balha)	Samir Souissi
1996	Mehrez Khelifi (Balha)	Samir Souissi	Mohamed Yazidi
1997	Samir Souissi	Ahmed Mraihi	Lamjed Belkadhi
1998	?	?	?
1999	Samir Souissi	Hassen Mezrigui	Lamjed Belkadhi
2000	Ahmed Mraihi	Ayman Ben Hassine	Nizar Zemzemi
2001	?	?	?
2002	Hichem Dridi	Taïeb Dridi	Nizar Zemzemi
2003	?	?	?
2004	Ayman Ben Hassine	Samir Souissi	?
2005	Ayman Ben Hassine	Ahmed Mraihi	Hassen Ben Nasser
2006	Karim Jendoubi	Ayman Ben Hassine	Ahmed Mraihi
2007	Ayman Ben Hassine	Aymen Berini	Hassen Ben Nasser
2008	Hassen Ben Nasser	Maher Hasnaoui	Moncef Yaakoubi
2009	Maher Hasnaoui	Ahmed Mraihi	Karim Jendoubi
2010	Rafaâ Chtioui	Riadh Ghedamsi	Maher Hasnaoui
2011	Ahmed Ben Maatoug	Ali Akkouche	Hassen Ben Nasser
2012	Hassen Ben Nasser	Maher Hasnaoui	Ahmed Mraihi
2013	Rafaâ Chtioui	Maher Hasnaoui	Houssam Nasri
2014	Rafaâ Chtioui	Maher Hasnaoui	Houssam Nasri
2015	Rafaâ Chtioui	Hamza Fatnassi	Ali Nouisri
2016	Ali Nouisri	Nadhem Ben Amor	Maher Hasnaoui
2017	Ali Nouisri	Maher Hasnaoui	Hassen Ben Nasser
2018	Ali Nouisri	Maher Hasnaoui	Hassen Ben Nasser
2019	Hassen Ben Nasser	Khaled Kammoun	Wajdi Homrani

=== Time trial ===
Year	Winner	Second	Third
2007	Ayman Ben Hassine	Aymen Berini	Ahmed Mraihi
2008	Ayman Ben Hassine	Aymen Berini	Ahmed Mraihi
2009	No race
2010	Ahmed Mraihi	Ahmed Ben Maatoug	Ali Akkouche
2011	Riadh Gdhamsi	Ahmed Mraihi	Ali Akkouche
2012	Hassen Ben Nasser	Ahmed Mraihi	Maher Hasnaoui
2013	Rafaâ Chtioui	Maher Hasnaoui	Hassen Ben Nasser
2014	Hassen Ben Nasser	Ali Nouisri	Houssam Nasri
2015	Rafaâ Chtioui	Maher Hasnaoui	Hassen Ben Nasser
2016	Maher Hasnaoui	Ali Nouisri	Hassen Ben Nasser
2017	Ali Nouisri	Maher Hasnaoui	Hassen Ben Nasser
2018	Ali Nouisri	Maher Hasnaoui	Nazhem Ben Amor
2019	Ali Nouisri	Hassen Ben Nasser	Maher Hasnaoui

== Women ==
Year	Road Race	Time Trial
2014	Nour Dissem	Nour Dissem
2015	Nour Dissem	Nour Dissem
2016	Nour Dissem	
2019	Tasmine Gharbi	Tasmine Gharbi
