= Mouhssine Lahsaini =

Moroccan racing cyclist

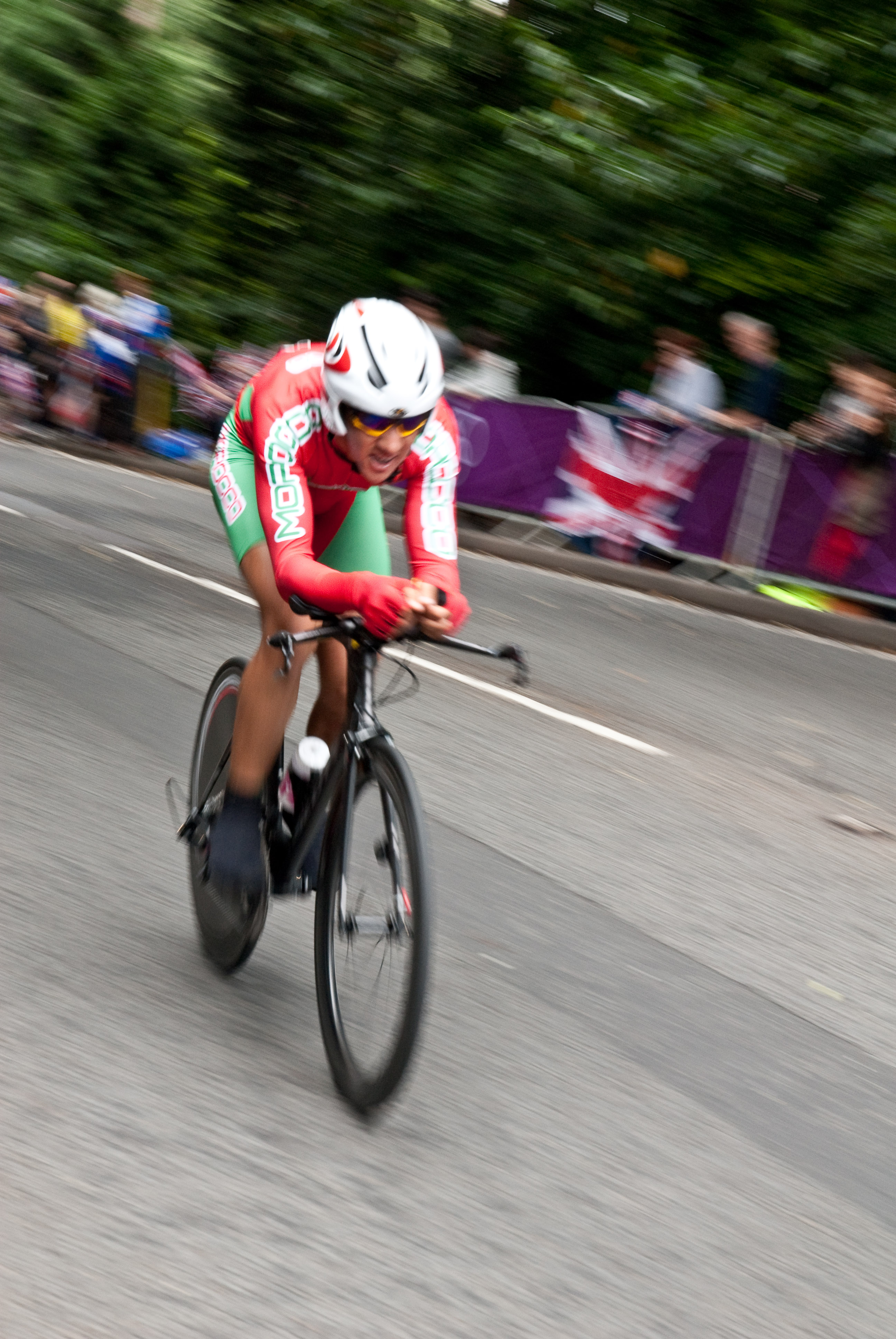
- Lahsaini competing in the men's time trial at the 2012 Summer Olympics

Personal information
- Full name: Mouhssine Lahsaini
- Born: 23 August 1985 (age 41) Khouribga, Morocco

Cycling career
- Sport: Cycling
- Discipline: Road
- Role: Rider

Amateur team
- 2016–2017: Blanca Sport

Professional teams
- 2013: Vélo Club Sovac
- 2015: Al Marakeb Cycling Team
- 2018: Sharjah Team

Major wins
- One day races National Time Trial Championships (2010–2012)

Mouhssine Lahsaini (born 23 August 1985) is a Moroccan road bicycle racer. He competed at the 2012 Summer Olympics in the Men's road race, and in the men's time trial, finishing 34th, 6 minutes and 45 seconds behind winner Bradley Wiggins.

== Major results ==
2006
1st Stage 10 Tour du Maroc
9th Overall Tour du Faso

1st Stage 11

2007
1st Pan Arab Games
3rd Road race, National Road Championships
3rd Overall Tour du Faso

1st Young rider classification
1st Stage 1

7th Overall Tour du Maroc
7th Overall Tour du Sénégal
2008
8th H. H. Vice-President's Cup
2009
2nd Overall Tour du Faso

1st Stage 2

3rd Road race, National Road Championships
3rd Circuit Hammadi Chennaf
6th Grand Prix of Sharm el-Sheikh
8th Time trial, African Road Championships
8th Overall Tour of Rwanda

1st Stages 5 & 8

2010
1st Time trial, National Road Championships
1st Overall Tour du Mali
1st Casablanca - Azemmour
1st H. H. Vice-President's Cup
Les Challenges de la Marche Verte

1st GP Sakia El Hamra
4th GP Oued Eddahab
6th GP Al Massira

3rd Overall 2009–10 UCI Africa Tour
6th Overall Tour du Maroc
Challenge du Prince

6th Trophée de la Maison Royale
7th Trophée Princier
8th Trophée de l'Anniversaire

9th Time trial, African Road Championships
2011
National Road Championships

1st Time trial
4th Road race

1st Overall Tour du Maroc

1st Stage 8

1st Coupe du Trône
1st Rabat - FUS
Pan Arab Games

1st Team time trial
2nd Time trial
2nd Team road race

3rd Moroccan Season Opener
African Road Championships

3rd Team time trial
5th Time trial
8th Road race

4th Challenge Youssoufia, Challenge des phosphates
5th Overall 2010–11 UCI Africa Tour
6th Trophée Princier, Challenge du Prince
7th Circuit d'Alger
2012
National Road Championships

1st Time trial
4th Road race

1st Challenge Youssoufia, Challenge des phosphates
1st Kalâat Sraghna - ACCC
1st Mountains classification Course de la Solidarité Olympique
Les Challenges de la Marche Verte

3rd GP Sakia El Hamra
10th GP Oued Eddahab

5th Overall Tour du Maroc
6th Trophée de la Maison Royale, Challenge du Prince
8th Circuit d'Alger
2013
Challenge du Prince

3rd Trophée Princier
9th Trophée de l'Anniversaire
9th Trophée de la Maison Royale

2014
Les Challenges de la Marche Verte

1st GP Oued Eddahab
4th GP Sakia El Hamra

1st Critérium International de Sétif
1st Trophée de l'Anniversaire, Challenge du Prince
2nd Time trial, National Road Championships
2nd Overall Tour du Maroc
5th Overall Tour d'Algérie
2015
1st Overall Tour de Côte d'Ivoire

1st Stage 2 (ITT)

1st Overall Grand Prix Chantal Biya
1st Overall Tour du Faso
Challenge des phosphates

1st Grand Prix de Khouribga
9th Grand Prix de Ben Guerir

National Road Championships

2nd Time trial
3rd Road race

6th Overall Tour d'Egypte
7th Overall Sharjah International Cycling Tour
Challenge du Prince

7th Trophée de l'Anniversaire
8th Trophée de la Maison Royale
10th Trophée Princier

8th Time trial, African Road Championships
2016
African Road Championships

1st Time trial
3rd Team time trial

Challenge du Prince

1st Trophée de la Maison Royale
4th Trophée de l'Anniversaire

National Road Championships

2nd Time trial
2nd Road race

9th Overall Tour de Tunisie
2017
National Road Championships

1st Time trial
5th Road race

5th Overall Tour du Maroc
2018
9th Overall Tour International de la Wilaya d'Oran
