= Maher Hasnaoui =

Tunisian cyclist

Personal information
- Born: 22 September 1989 (age 37) Tunisia

Cycling career
- Sport: Cycling
- Discipline: Road
- Role: Rider

Professional team
- 2014–2017: Skydive Dubai Pro Cycling

Maher Hasnaoui (born 22 September 1989) is a Tunisian cyclist.

== Major results ==
2008
2nd Road race, National Road Championships
2009
1st Road race, National Road Championships
2010
1st Time trial, Arab Road Championships
3rd Road race, National Road Championships
2011
2nd Team time trial, Pan Arab Games
2nd Road race, Arab Under-23 Road Championships
2012
2nd Team time trial, African Road Championships
National Road Championships

2nd Road race
3rd Time trial

2013
1st Trophée de la Maison Royale, Challenge du Prince
National Road Championships

2nd Road race
2nd Time trial

2014
2nd Road race, National Road Championships
2015
1st Overall Tour of Al Zubarah

1st Stage 1

1st UAE Cup
1st Stage 2 (TTT) Jelajah Malaysia
2nd Time trial, National Road Championships
2016
National Road Championships

1st Time trial
3rd Road race

2017
National Road Championships

2nd Road race
2nd Time trial

4th Overall Tour de Tunisie

1st Stage 4

2018
National Road Championships

2nd Road race
2nd Time trial

7th Overall Tour de la Pharmacie Centrale
10th Overall Tour d'Algérie
2019
3rd Time trial, National Road Championships
