= Cycling at the 2005 Mediterranean Games =

The cycling competition at the 2005 Mediterranean Games was a men-only competition. Track events were absent from the programme and the only two events were an individual time trial and an individual road race.

== Men's competition ==
=== Individual Time Trial ===
- Held on Wednesday June 29, 2005 over 28 kilometres

RANK	FINAL RANKING	TIME	BEHIND
1st place, gold medalist(s)	Marcos Tendero (ESP)	35:41.28	—
2nd place, silver medalist(s)	Eladio Sánchez (ESP)	36:02.99	21.71
3rd place, bronze medalist(s)	Florian Morizot (FRA)	36:03.22	21.94
4.	Tiziano Dall'Antonia (ITA)	36:18.49	37.21
5.	Martin Cotar (CRO)	36:32.03	50.75
6.	Emilien Berges (FRA)	36:44.47	1:03.19
7.	Roberto Traficante (ITA)	36:55.31	1:14.03
8.	Rafaa Chtioui (TUN)	37:35.77	1:54.49
9.	Ioannis Tamouridis (GRE)	38:15.16	2:33.88
10.	Aymen Ben Hassine (TUN)	39:04.28	3:23.00
11.	Panagiotis Potsakis (GRE)	39:14.81	3:33.53
12.	Samir Kovacevic (BIH)	39:53.60	4:12.32
12.	Kemal Kücükbay (TUR)	39:59.32	4:18.04
14.	Elvis Jahic (BIH)	40:37.96	4:56.68
15.	Mehmet Mütlü (TUR)	41:23.37	5:42.09
16.	Wail Al-Ganduz (LBA)	42:36.16	6:54.88

=== Individual Road Race ===
- Held on Saturday July 2, 2005 over 141 kilometres

RANK	FINAL RANKING	TIME	BEHIND
1st place, gold medalist(s)	Mathieu Perget (FRA)	3:33:05	—
2nd place, silver medalist(s)	Stéphane Poulhies (FRA)	3:34:52	1:47
3rd place, bronze medalist(s)	Mauro Santambrogio (ITA)	"	"
4.	Alexandre Cabrera (FRA)	"	"
5.	Zubiaur Elorriaga (ESP)	"	"
6.	Ivan Stević (SCG)	"	"
7.	Rafaa Chtioui (TUN)	"	"
8.	Robert Kišerlovski (CRO)	"	"
9.	Mathieu Ladagnous (FRA)	"	"
10.	Panagiotis Potsakis (GRE)	"	"
11.	Javier Moreno Bazan (ESP)	3:35:10	2:05
12.	Ioannis Tamouridis (GRE)	3:36:05	3:00
13.	Georgios Tentsos (GRE)	"	"
14.	Martin Cotar (CRO)	3:37:51	4:46
15.	Emilien Berges (FRA)	3:41:10	8:05
16.	Fabio Sabatini (ITA)	3:41:12	8:07
17.	Marcos Tendero (ESP)	3:45:09	12:04
18.	Aymen Ben Hassine (TUN)	3:47:11	14:06
19.	Emanuel Kiserlovski (CRO)	3:47:23	14:18
20.	Kemal Kücükbay (TUR)	3:47:39	14:34
21.	Behcet Usta (TUR)	3:47:41	14:36
22.	David Demanuelle (CRO)	3:52:37	19:32
23.	Zvonimir Pokupec (CRO)	3:55:42	22:37
24.	Elvis Jahic (BIH)	4:00:41	27:36
25.	Aleksandar Jugovic (SCG)	4:01:54	28:49
DID NOT FINISH
—	Samir Kovacevic (BIH)		
—	Vladimir Kuvalja (BIH)		
—	Alvaro Gutierrez (ESP)		
—	Antonio Redondo (ESP)		
—	José Rojas Gil (ESP)		
—	Eladio Sanchez (ESP)		
—	Leal Mejias (ESP)		
—	Florian Morizot (FRA)		
—	Jean-Marc Marino (FRA)		
—	Benoît Sinner (FRA)		
—	Nikolaos Kaloudakis (GRE)		
—	Minas Malatos (GRE)		
—	Alexandros Mavridis (GRE)		
—	Eros Capecchi (ITA)		
—	Roberto Traficante (ITA)		
—	Carlo Scognamiglio (ITA)		
—	Tiziano Dall'Antonia (ITA)		
—	Wail Al-Ganduz (LBA)		
—	Goran Smelcerovic (SCG)		
—	Dragan Spasic (SCG)		
—	Mustafa Karaselek (TUR)		
—	Orhan Sahin (TUR)		
—	Mustafa Maral (TUR)		
—	Mehmet Mütlü (TUR)		

== Medal table ==
Place	Nation	1st place, gold medalist(s)	2nd place, silver medalist(s)	3rd place, bronze medalist(s)	Total
1	France	1	1	1	3
2	Spain	1	1	0	2
3	Italy	0	0	1	1
Total		2	2	2	6
