= Tour of Al Zubarah =

Qatari multi-day road cycling race

Race details
- Date: December
- Region: Qatar
- Discipline: Road
- Type: Stage race
- Web site: zubarahtour.com

History
- First edition: 2013
- Editions: 2 (as of 2014)
- First winner: Yousef Mohamed Mirza (UAE)
- Most wins: No repeat winners
- Most recent: Meher Hasnaoui (TUN)

Tour of Al Zubarah is a men's four-days cycle race which takes place in Zubarah, Qatar and was rated by the UCI as 2.2 and forms part of the UCI Asia Tour. It was inaugurated on December 4, 2013.

== Overall winners ==
Year	Winner	Team
2013	(United Arab Emirates) Yousif Mirza	United Arab Emirates (national team)
2014	(Algeria) Azzedine Lagab	Groupement Sportif des Pétroliers d'Algérie
2015	(Tunisia) Maher Hasnaoui	Skydive Dubai–Al Ahli

== Official page ==
http://www.zubarahtour.com/
