= Jeremy Maartens =

South African bicycle racer (born 1979)

Personal information
- Born: 14 August 1979 (age 47) Cape Town, South Africa

Cycling career
- Sport: Cycling
- Current team: Retired
- Discipline: Road
- Role: Rider

Professional teams
- 2002–2003: Team HSBC
- 2005–2006: Barloworld
- 2008: Team Neotel
- 2009: House of Paint

Jeremy Maartens (born 14 August 1979) is a South African former professional road cyclist.

== Major results ==
2001
1st Stage 6 FBD Milk Ras
2003
1st Road race, All-Africa Games
1st Time trial, National Road Championships
1st Stage 3 (ITT) Tour de la Manche
7th Overall Giro del Capo
2004
1st Overall Tour de Tunisie

1st Young rider classification
1st Stage 7 (ITT)

1st Overall Tour du Maroc
1st Stage 5 Tour of Qinghai Lake
5th Time trial, National Road Championships
10th Overall Giro del Capo
2007
4th Overall Tour du Maroc
