= Mohamed El Gourch =

Moroccan cyclist (1936–2015)

Personal information
- Born: 11 January 1936 Casablanca, Morocco
- Died: 21 February 2015 (aged 79) Casablanca, Morocco

Cycling career
- Sport: Cycling
- Discipline: Road
- Role: Rider

Major wins
- Tour du Maroc (1960, 1964, 1965)

Mohamed El Gourch (Arabic: محمد الكورش; 11 January 1936 – 21 February 2015) was a Moroccan road racing cyclist who won the Tour du Maroc, a record three times, in 1960, 1964 and 1965. He was also second in 1967, and was third in 1968 and 1969. He competed in the individual road race and team time trial events at the 1960 Summer Olympics. Gourch died in February 2015 after suffering a heart attack. He was 79.
