= Ayman Ben Hassine =

Tunisian cyclist

Personal information
- Born: 8 November 1980 (age 45)

Cycling career
- Sport: Cycling
- Discipline: Road
- Role: Rider

Professional team
- 2008–2009: Doha Team

Ayman Ben Hassine (born 8 November 1980) is a Tunisian cyclist.

== Palmares ==
2000
2nd National Road Race Championships
2004
1st National Road Race Championships
1st Stage 1 Tour d'Egypte
2005
1st National Road Race Championships
1st Stage 4 Tour d'Egypte
2006
1st Stage 6 Tour des Aéroports
1st Stage 2 Tour du Maroc
2nd National Road Race Championships
2007
1st National Road Race Championships
1st National Time Trial Championships
1st Stage 5 Tour d'Egypte
1st Stage 6 Tour of Libya
2008
1st National Time Trial Championships
1st Stages 1 & 8 Tour de la Pharmacie Centrale
1st International Grand Prix Messaeed
1st International Grand Prix Doha
1st Stage 2 Cycling Golden Jersey
2nd Overall Tour d'Egypte

1st Stages 3 & 4

2009
1st HH Vice-President's Cup
1st Emirates Cup
