= Tour Ivoirien de la Paix =

Race details
- Region: Côte d'Ivoire
- English name: Ivoirian Tour of Peace
- Discipline: Road
- Competition: UCI Africa Tour
- Type: Stage race

History
- First edition: 2008
- Editions: 1
- Final edition: 2008
- First winner: Rony Martias (FRA)
- Final winner: Rony Martias (FRA)

Tour Ivoirien de la Paix was a professional road bicycle racing event held in Côte d'Ivoire in 2008. The 6-day stage race was part of the UCI Africa Tour as a 2.1 rated event. A second edition of the race was planned for 2011, but was never held.

== Past winners ==
| Year | Country | Rider | Team |
|---|---|---|---|
| 2008 | France | Rony Martias | Bouygues Télécom |
