= Skydive Dubai–Al Ahli Pro Cycling Team =

Emirati cycling team

Team information
- UCI code: SKD
- Registered: Dubai, United Arab Emirates
- Founded: 2014
- Discipline: Road
- Status: UCI Continental

Team name history
- 2014 2015–2016 2017–: Skydive Dubai Pro Cycling Team; Skydive Dubai Pro Cycling Team–Al Ahli Club; Skydive Dubai–Al Ahli Pro Cycling Team

Skydive Dubai–Al Ahli Pro Cycling Team (UCI team code: SKD) is a men's professional UCI Continental cycling team, based in Dubai, United Arab Emirates. The team competes in the UCI Continental Circuits.

== Team roster ==
Rider	Date of birth
Ibrahim Al Ali (UAE)	17 November 1994 (age 31)
Sultan Alhammadi (UAE)	15 August 1993 (age 33)
Saeed Desmal (UAE)	2 August 1998 (age 28)
Soufiane Haddi (MAR)	2 February 1991 (age 35)
Maher Hasnaoui (TUN)	22 September 1989 (age 36)
Khalid Ibrahim (UAE)	12 November 1995 (age 30)

Rider	Date of birth
Adil Jelloul (MAR)	14 July 1982 (age 44)
Francisco Mancebo (ESP)	9 March 1976 (age 50)
Mohamed Mehrab (UAE)	13 May 1998 (age 28)
Tariq Obaid (UAE)	1 April 1984 (age 42)
Marlen Zmorka (UKR)	1 July 1993 (age 33)

== Major wins ==
2014
Morocco National Time Trial Championships, Soufiane Haddi
Morocco National Road Race Championships, Adil Jelloul
Tunisia National Road Race Championships, Rafaâ Chtioui
Stage 1 Tour of Thailand, Lucas Sebastián Haedo
Melaka Governor's Cup, Alexandre Pliușchin
Overall Tour de Kumano, Francisco Mancebo

Stage 2 Francisco Mancebo

Stage 1 Tour of Thailand, Lucas Sebastián Haedo
Stage 5 Tour de Singkarak, Óscar Pujol
Stage 8 Tour de Singkarak, Soufiane Haddi
Overall Sharjah International Cycling Tour, Alexandre Pliușchin

Stages 1 & 3, Alexandre Pliușchin
Stage 2, Soufiane Haddi

Overall Jelajah Malaysia, Rafaâ Chtioui

Stage 1, Rafaâ Chtioui

2015
Overall Tour d'Egypte, Francisco Mancebo

Stage 1, Francisco Mancebo
Stages 2 & 4, Andrea Palini
Stage 3, Soufiane Haddi

Overall La Tropicale Amissa Bongo, Rafaâ Chtioui

Stages 1 & 2, Rafaâ Chtioui
Stage 4, Andrea Palini

Stage 3 Tour du Maroc, Edgar Pinto
Stage 6 Tour du Maroc, Soufiane Haddi
Stage 8 Tour du Maroc, Vladimir Gusev
Stage 2 Tour of Japan, Rafaâ Chtioui
Morocco National Time Trial Championships, Soufiane Haddi
Tunisia National Time Trial Championships, Rafaâ Chtioui
Tunisia National Road Race Championships, Rafaâ Chtioui
Stages 1 & 2 Tour of Hainan, Andrea Palini
Overall Sharjah International Cycling Tour, Soufiane Haddi

Stages 1, 2 & 3, Soufiane Haddi
Stage 4, Andrea Palini

UAE Cup, Maher Hasnaoui
Overall Jelajah Malaysia, Francisco Mancebo

Stage 1, Francisco Mancebo
Stage 2, Team time trial
Stage 4, Andrea Palini

Overall Tour of Al Zubarah, Maher Hasnaoui

Stage 1, Maher Hasnaoui

2016
Stages 1 & 2 La Tropicale Amissa Bongo, Andrea Palini
Stage 4 La Tropicale Amissa Bongo, Adil Jelloul
Stage 2 Tour de Langkawi, Andrea Palini
Tunisia National Time Trial Championships, Maher Hasnaoui
Morocco National Time Trial Championships, Soufiane Haddi
Stage 1 Sharjah International Cycling Tour, Team time trial

== National champions ==
2014
Morocco Time Trial, Soufiane Haddi
Morocco Road Race, Adil Jelloul
Tunisia Road Race, Rafaâ Chtioui
2015
Morocco Time Trial, Soufiane Haddi
Tunisia Time Trial, Rafaâ Chtioui
Tunisia Road Race, Rafaâ Chtioui
2016
Tunisia Time Trial, Meher Hasnaoui
