= Tareq Esmaeili =

Qatari cyclist

Tareq Al-Esmaeili
Personal information
- Born: 3 March 1977 (age 49) Qatar

Cycling career
- Sport: Cycling
- Current team: Technical director and Head coach at Qatar Cycling federation.
- Discipline: Road
- Role: Rider

Professional teams
- 2005: Aljazeera Sport Channel
- 2007-2009: Doha Team

Tareq Al-Esmaeili (born 3 March 1977) is a Qatari cyclist.

== Palmares ==
2004
(Qatar) National Road Race Champion
2009
(Qatar) National Road Race Champion
(Qatar) National Cross Country Champion
