= Ali Nouisri =

Tunisian cyclist (born 1994)

Personal information
- Full name: Ali Nouisri
- Born: 20 January 1994 (age 32)

Cycling career
- Sport: Cycling
- Current team: Yasi Team
- Discipline: Road
- Role: Rider

Amateur teams
- 2017: Naturablue
- 2022–: Yasi Team

Professional team
- 2018–2019: VIB Sports

Ali Nouisri (born 20 January 1994) is a Tunisian cyclist, who rides for Emirati amateur team Yasi Team. He rode in the road race at the 2016 Summer Olympics.

== Major results ==
2014
2nd Time trial, National Road Championships
2015
3rd Road race, National Road Championships
5th Overall Tour International de Sétif
7th Time trial, African Under-23 Road Championships
10th Critérium International de Sétif
2016
National Road Championships

1st Road race
2nd Time trial

5th Overall Tour International de Sétif

1st Young rider classification

5th Overall Tour d'Oranie

1st Young rider classification

6th Overall Tour du Sénégal
2017
National Road Championships

1st Road race
1st Time trial

3rd Overall Tour de Tunisie

1st Young rider classification
1st Stage 3

4th Overall Tour du Sénégal
2018
National Road Championships

1st Road race
1st Time trial

1st Stage 6 Tour d'Algérie
4th Overall Tour de la Pharmacie Centrale
5th Grand Prix de la Pharmacie Centrale
2019
1st Time trial, National Road Championships
