= Badr Mirza =

Emirati cyclist

Personal information
- Full name: Badr Mohamed Mirza Bani Al-Hammadi
- Born: 7 January 1984 (age 42)

Cycling career
- Sport: Cycling
- Current team: Retired
- Discipline: Road
- Role: Rider

Professional teams
- 2007–2009: Doha Team
- 2016: Al Nasr Pro Cycling Team–Dubai

Badr Mohamed Mirza Bani Al-Hammadi (born 7 January 1984) is an Emirati former racing cyclist. His brother Yousif is also a professional cyclist, who rides for UAE Team Emirates XRG.

== Major results ==
2006
2nd Time trial, National Road Championships
2007
National Road Championships

2nd Time trial
3rd Road race

7th Road race, Asian Cycling Championships
2008
Persian Gulf Road Championships

1st Road race
1st Time trial

1st Time trial, National Road Championships
1st H. H. Vice-President's Cup
1st Prologue, Tour of the AGCC Arab Gulf
2009
Persian Gulf Road Championships

1st Road race
1st Team time trial
2nd Time trial

1st Time trial, National Road Championships
1st Prologue & Stages 1 & 4 Tour of the AGCC Arab Gulf
2010
1st President's Cup
2011
National Road Championships

1st Road race
2nd Time trial

1st Overall Prince Faisal bin Fahd International Stage Race

1st Stage 1

2012
National Road Championships

1st Road race
2nd Time trial

3rd Road race, Persian Gulf Road Championships
2013
2nd Road race, National Road Championships
2015
National Road Championships

1st Time trial
2nd Road race

1st Stage 2 Tour of the AGCC Arab Gulf
2017
3rd Time trial, National Road Championships
