= Matthias Legley =

Belgian cyclist (born 1991)

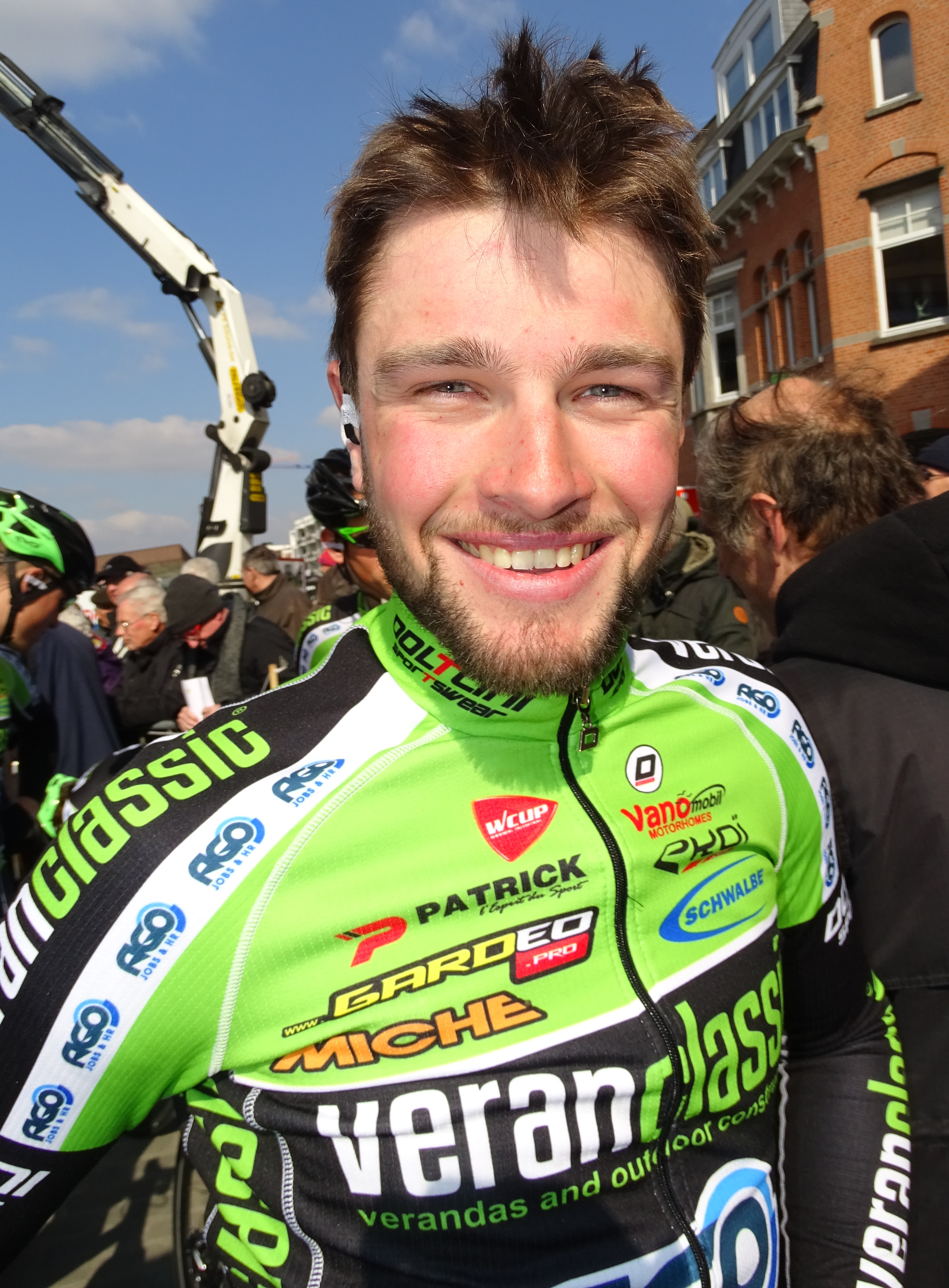

Personal information
- Born: 15 January 1991 (age 35) Waregem, Belgium

Cycling career
- Sport: Cycling
- Current team: Retired
- Discipline: Road
- Role: Rider

Amateur teams
- 2009: OO Parike
- 2010: New Heebra–Lombarden
- 2011: EFC–Quick Step
- 2012–2013: Soenens–Construkt Glas
- 2014–2015: ESEG Douai
- 2017: Naturablue

Professional teams
- 2016: Veranclassic–Ago
- 2018: Sovac–Natura4Ever

Matthias Legley (born 15 January 1991 in Waregem) is a Belgian former professional road cyclist.

== Major results ==
2009
2nd Omloop Het Nieuwsblad Juniors
2012
6th Paris–Tours Espoirs
2016
1st Stage 4 Tour de Tunisie
2017
1st Overall Tour de Tunisie
1st Stage 7 Tour du Cameroun
1st Stages 3 & 7 Tour du Sénégal
2nd Trophée de la Maison Royale, Challenge du Prince
3rd Overall Tour de Côte d'Ivoire

1st Stage 1
