= Cycling at the 2011 Arab Games =

Cycling at the 2011 Pan Arab Games
- Venue: Lusail Cycling Circuit
- Location: Doha, Qatar
- Dates: 19-23 December

At the 2011 Pan Arab Games, the cycling events were held at Lusail Cycling Circuit in Doha, Qatar from 19–23 December. A total of 7 events were contested.

== Medal summary ==
=== Men ===
Event	Gold	Silver	Bronze
Individual Road Race	Adil Jelloul (MAR)	Azzedine Lagab (ALG)	Youcef Reguigui (ALG)
Team Road Race	Algeria (ALG); Azzedine Lagab; Abdelmalek Madani; Youcef Reguigui	Morocco (MAR); Reda Aadel; Ismail Ayoune; Tarik Chaoufi; Adil Jelloul; Mouhssine Lahsaini; Abdelati Saadoune	United Arab Emirates (UAE); Bader Albloodhi; Yousif Alhammadi; Khaled Ali Theni
Individual Time Trial	Rafaa Chtioui (TUN)	Mouhssine Lahsaini (MAR)	Azzedine Lagab (ALG)
Team Time Trial	Morocco (MAR); Ismail Ayoune; Adil Jelloul; Mouhssine Lahsaini; Abdelati Saadoune	Tunisia (TUN); Rafaa Chtioui; Riadh Ghdamesi; Meher Hasnaoui; Aymen Mraihi	Algeria (ALG); Abdelah Benyoucef; Abderrahmane Bourezza; Azzedine Lagab; Abdelmalek Madani

=== Women ===
Event	Gold	Silver	Bronze
Individual Road Race	Samah Khaled (JOR)	Nour Dissem (TUN)	Ebtissam Mohamed (EGY)
Team Road Race	Tunisia (TUN); Nour Dissem; Rihab Hijajij; Rihab Mansouri	Egypt (EGY); Kheloud Ali; Aya Hassan; Ebtissam Mohamed	Jordan (JOR); Hanade Alazazmeh; Samah Khaled; Razan Soboh
Individual Time Trial	Asmaa Namli (MAR)	Nour Dissem (TUN)	Razan Soboh (JOR)

== Medal table ==
Rank	Nation	Gold	Silver	Bronze	Total
1	Morocco	3	2	0	5
2	Tunisia	2	3	0	5
3	Algeria	1	1	3	5
4	Jordan	1	0	2	3
5	Egypt	0	1	1	2
6	United Arab Emirates	0	0	1	1
Totals (6 entries)		7	7	7	21
