= Eladio Sánchez =

Spanish cyclist

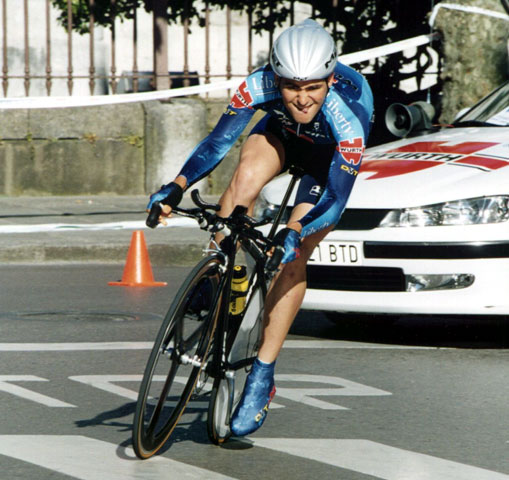

Personal information
- Full name: Eladio Sánchez Prado
- Born: 12 July 1984 (age 42) Castro Urdiales, Spain

Cycling career
- Sport: Cycling
- Current team: Retired
- Discipline: Road
- Role: Rider

Professional teams
- 2006: Liberty Seguros–Würth
- 2007: Fuerteventura–Canarias
- 2008: Orbea–Oreka SDA

Eladio Sánchez Prado (born 12 July 1984) is a Spanish former professional road racing cyclist.

== Major results ==
2002
1st Junior National Cyclo-cross Championships
2004
1st Under–23 National Time Trial Championships
1st Stage 3 Vuelta a Salamanca
2005
2nd Road race, Mediterranean Games
2008
2nd Overall Tour du Loir-et-Cher
