= Masamichi Yamamoto =

Japanese cyclist

Personal information
- Full name: Masamichi Yamamoto; Japanese: 山本 雅道
- Born: August 4, 1978 (age 48) Fujisawa, Kanagawa, Japan
- Height: 171 cm (5 ft 7 in)
- Weight: 64 kg (141 lb)

Cycling career
- Sport: Cycling
- Current team: Retired
- Discipline: Road
- Role: Rider
- Rider type: Sprinter

Amateur teams
- 2012–2014: BFY Racing Team
- 2016: Ciervo Nara

Professional teams
- 1998–1999: Nippon Hodo
- 2000: Miyata–Subaru
- 2001–2004: Shimano Racing Team
- 2005–2007: Skil–Shimano
- 2008–2011: Bridgestone–Anchor
- 2015: Kinan Cycling Team

Masamichi Yamamoto (山本 雅道, Yamamoto Masamichi; born August 4, 1978 in Fujisawa, Kanagawa) is a Japanese former professional cyclist.

== Major results ==
1999
1st Road race, National Under-23 Road Championships
2000
1st Road race, National Under-23 Road Championships
3rd Tour de Okinawa
2004
1st Shimano Suzuka Road race
2005
1st Shimano Suzuka Road race
2008
1st Stage 8a Tour de la Martinique
