= International Grand Prix Doha =

Race details
- Date: January (2004–2006), December (2008)
- Region: Qatar
- Discipline: Road
- Competition: UCI Asia Tour
- Type: One day race

History
- First edition: 2004
- Editions: 4
- Final edition: 2008
- First winner: Simone Cadamuro (ITA)
- Most wins: No repeat winners
- Final winner: Ayman Ben Hassine (TUN)

The International Grand Prix Doha was a one day road cycling race held in Qatar. It was part of UCI Asia Tour in category 1.1 in 2005 and 2006 1.2 in 2008.

== Winners ==
Year	Country	Rider	Team
2004	Italy	Simone Cadamuro	De Nardi
2005	South Africa	Robert Hunter	Phonak
2006	Belgium	Tom Boonen	Quick-Step–Innergetic
2008	Tunisia	Ayman Ben Hassine	Doha Team
