= Nour Dissem =

Tunisian cyclist

Personal information
- Born: 12 May 1990 (age 36) La Marsa, Tunisia

Cycling career
- Sport: Cycling
- Disciplines: Road; Track
- Role: Rider

Nour Dissem (born 12 May 1990 in La Marsa) is a Tunisian road and track cyclist. She won five national titles at the Tunisian National Road Championships between 2014 and 2016.

== Major results ==
2011
Pan Arab Games

1st Team road race
2nd Road race
2nd Time trial

2013
8th Road race, African Road Championships
2014
National Road Championships

1st Time trial
1st Road race

2015
National Road Championships

1st Time trial
1st Road race

3rd Omnium, African Track Championships
2016
1st Road race, National Road Championships
