= Adriano Angeloni =

Italian cyclist

Personal information
- Born: 31 January 1983 (age 43) Frascati, Italy

Cycling career
- Sport: Cycling
- Current team: Retired
- Discipline: Road
- Role: Rider

Professional teams
- 2006–2009: Ceramica Flaminia–Bossini Docce
- 2010–2011: Betonexpressz 2000–Universal Caffé

Adriano Angeloni (born 31 January 1983 in Frascati) is an Italian former cyclist.

== Major results ==
2005
1st U23 National Road Race Championships
2007
1st Giro del Medio Brenta
2010
1st Trophée de la Maison Royale
3rd Grand Prix of Donetsk
