= UAE Cup =

Race details
- Date: December
- Region: United Arab Emirates
- Discipline: Road
- Type: One day race

History
- First edition: 2015
- Editions: 2 (as of 2016)
- First winner: Maher Hasnaoui (TUN)
- Most wins: No repeat winners
- Most recent: Siarhei Papok (BLR)

UAE Cup is a men's one-day cycle race which takes place in the United Arab Emirates and was rated by the UCI as 1.2 and forms part of the UCI Asia Tour.

== Winners ==
Year	Country	Rider	Team
2015	Tunisia	Maher Hasnaoui	Skydive Dubai–Al Ahli
2016	Belarus	Siarhei Papok	Minsk Cycling Club
