= Rony Martias =

French cyclist

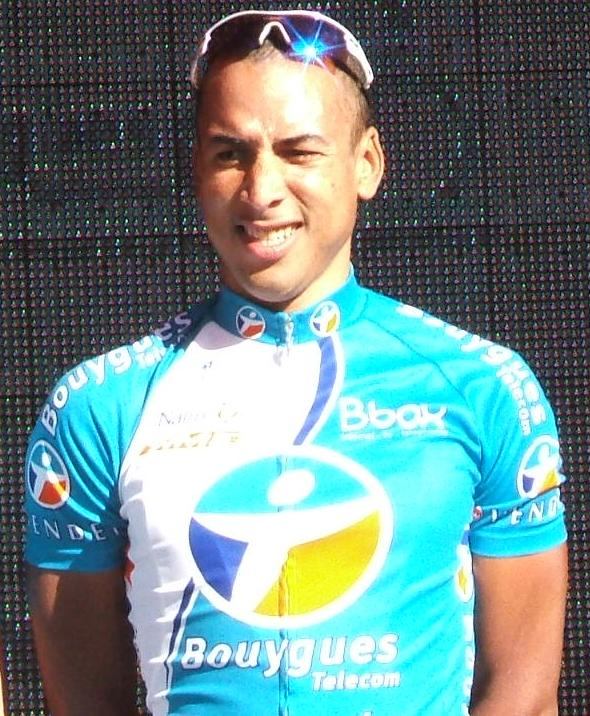

Personal information
- Full name: Rony Martias
- Born: August 4, 1980 (age 46) Basse-Terre, Guadeloupe, France
- Height: 1.81 m (5 ft 11 in)
- Weight: 71 kg (157 lb)

Cycling career
- Sport: Cycling
- Current team: UC Cholet 49
- Discipline: Road
- Role: Rider

Amateur teams
- 2002: Bonjour (stagiaire)
- 2014–: UC Cholet 49

Professional teams
- 2003–2009: Brioches La Boulangère
- 2010–2013: Saur–Sojasun

Rony Martias (born August 4, 1980 in Basse-Terre, Guadeloupe) is a French road bicycle racer for the UC Cholet 49 amateur team. Martias previously competed as a professional between 2003 and 2013, for the Bbox Bouygues Telecom and Sojasun squads.

After Sojasun folded at the end of the 2013 season, Martias returned to the amateur ranks with UC Cholet 49.

== Career highlights ==
2002
2nd, Paris – Mantes-en-Yvelines, U23
2003
1st, Prologue, Tour de la Guadeloupe
2005
141st, Overall, Giro d'Italia
2006
1st, Stage 1, Tour de Picardie, Péronne
2008
1st, Overall, Tour Ivoirien de la Paix

1st, Points classification
1st, Sprints classification

3rd, Overall, La Tropicale Amissa Bongo

1st, Stages 1 & 4 (Franceville & Kango)
