= Alexey Shchebelin =

Russian former professional road cyclist

Personal information
- Born: 13 July 1981 (age 45) Russia

Cycling career
- Sport: Cycling
- Current team: Retired
- Discipline: Road
- Role: Rider

Amateur team
- 2006: Ceramica Flaminia–Bossini Docce (stagiaire)

Professional teams
- 2007–2008: Cinelli–OPD–Endeka
- 2009: SP Tableware

Alexey Shchebelin (born 13 July 1981) is a Russian former professional road cyclist.

== Major results ==
2002
2nd Ronde van Limburg
2003
1st Poreč Trophy 3
2004
3rd GP San Giuseppe
2006
1st Stage 3 Giro della Valle d'Aosta
1st Stage 1b Giro del Friuli Venezia Giulia (TTT)
2nd Ruota d'Oro
2007
1st Stage 3 Paths of King Nikola
3rd Overall Vuelta a Navarra
2008
1st Overall Tour du Maroc

1st Stages 1, 4 & 7

1st Overall Circuito Montañés

1st Stage 6

2009
1st Overall Tour of Romania

1st Stage 7
