= Cinelli–OPD =

Bicycle racing team based in San Marino

Team information
- UCI code: CIN
- Registered: San Marino
- Founded: 2007
- Disbanded: 2008
- Discipline: Road
- Status: UCI Continental
- Bicycles: Cinelli

Key personnel
- General manager: Andrea Gurayev
- Team managers: Simone Biasci; Antonio Cibei; Roberto Pelliconi

Team name history
- 2007 2008: Cinelli–OPD–Endeka; Cinelli–OPD

Cinelli–OPD was a UCI Continental team based in San Marino that existed for the 2007 and 2008 seasons.

The team's main sponsor was Cinelli, an Italian bicycle manufacturer.

== Major wins ==
2007
Tour de Serbie

Points classification, Ivan Fanelli
Stage 1b & 7, Ivan Fanelli
Stage 6, Gianluca Cavalli

Giro d'Abruzzo

Stages 2 & 4, Ivan Fanelli
Stage 3, Gianluca Coletta

Stage 3 Paths of King Nikola, Alexey Shchebelin
Stage 5 Vuelta a la Comunidad de Madrid, Jesús Pérez
2008
Overall Tour du Maroc, Alexey Shchebelin

Stages 1a, 4 & 7, Alexey Shchebelin
Stage 1b, Ivan Fanelli
Stage 6b, Jesús Pérez

Overall Circuito Montañés, Alexey Shchebelin

Stage 6, Alexey Shchebelin

Clásico Ciclístico Banfoandes

Stage 5, Juan Pablo Dotti
Stage 8, Manuele Spadi

Stage 10 Vuelta Ciclista a Venezuela, Jesús Pérez
Stage 3 Vuelta Mexico, Ivan Fanelli
Stage 1 Istrian Spring Trophy, Ivan Fanelli
