= Doha Team =

Team information
- UCI code: DOT
- Registered: Qatar
- Founded: 2007
- Disbanded: 2009
- Discipline: Road
- Status: UCI Continental
- Bicycles: Wilier Triestina

Key personnel
- General manager: Ahmed Alhemaidi
- Team managers: Mustapha Allal Faci; Aziz Merzoug

Team name history
- 2007–2009: Doha Team

The Doha Team was a Qatari UCI Continental road cycling team that existed from 2007 to 2009. The team was sponsored by Doha, the capital city of Qatar.

== 2009 roster ==
Rider	Birth date	Nationality	2008 Team
Khaleel Abduljanan	10.04.1983	Qatar	
Rdhwan Al-Moraqab	01.01.1977	Qatar	
Taha Alawi	31.12.1986	Bahrain	Néo-pro
Farid Belhani	12.03.1984	Algeria	Néo-pro
Ayman Ben Hassine	08.11.1980	Tunisia	
Rafaâ Chtioui	26.01.1986	Tunisia	
Ahmed Elbourdainy	04.04.1990	Qatar	Néo-pro
Tareq Esmaeili	03.03.1977	Qatar	
Abdelbasset Hannachi	02.02.1985	Algeria	
Omar Hasanein	09.11.1978	Syria	
Azzedine Lagab	18.09.1986	Algeria	Néo-pro
Abdelmalek Madani	28.02.1983	Algeria	Néo-pro
Badr Mirza	07.01.1984	United Arab Emirates	
Yousif Mirza	08.10.1988	United Arab Emirates	Néo-pro
Said Moosa	11.04.1988	Qatar	
Fadi Khan Shikhoni	03.05.1985	Syria	Néo-pro

== Major wins ==
2008
Tour of Libya, Omar Hasanein (2008)
International Grand Prix Al-Khor, Rafaâ Chtioui (2008)
International Grand Prix Losail, Abdelbasset Hannachi (2008)
International Grand Prix Messaeed, Ayman Ben Hassine (2008)
International Grand Prix Doha, Ayman Ben Hassine (2008)
H. H. Vice-President's Cup, Badr Mohamed Mirza Bani Hammad
2009
Emirates Cup, Ayman Ben Hassine
H. H. Vice-President's Cup, Ayman Ben Hassine
