= Tour du Mali =

Cycling race

Race details
- Date: March
- Region: Mali
- Discipline: Road
- Competition: UCI Africa Tour
- Type: Stage race
- Web site: www.tourdumali.com

History
- First edition: 2002
- Editions: 3
- Final edition: 2010
- Most wins: No repeat winners
- Final winner: Mouhssine Lahsaini (MAR)

The Tour du Mali was a cycling race held in Mali. It was part of UCI Africa Tour in category 2.2 in 2010. The race was held 3 times, in 2002, 2004 and 2010.

== Winners ==
Year	Country	Rider	Team
2004	Burkina Faso	Seydou Tall	
2010	Morocco	Mouhssine Lahsaini	Morocco (national team)
