= International Grand Prix Al-Khor =

Cycling competition

Race details
- Date: December
- Region: Qatar
- Discipline: Road
- Competition: UCI Asia Tour
- Type: One day race

History
- First edition: 2008
- Editions: 1
- Final edition: 2008
- First winner: Rafaâ Chtioui (TUN)
- Most wins: No repeat winners
- Final winner: Rafaâ Chtioui (TUN)

The International Grand Prix Al-Khor was a one day road cycling race held in Qatar. Only one edition was held. It was part of UCI Asia Tour in category 1.2.

== Winners ==
Year	Country	Rider	Team
2008	Tunisia	Rafaâ Chtioui	Doha Team
