= Tour de Tunisie =

Cycling event

Race details
- Date: May
- Region: Tunisia
- English name: Tour of Tunisia
- Discipline: Road
- Competition: UCI Africa Tour
- Type: stage race

History
- First edition: 1953
- Editions: 34 (as of 2017)
- First winner: Béchir Merdassi (TUN)
- Most recent: Matthias Legley (BEL)

The Tour de Tunisie is a stage cycling race held annually in Tunisia since 1953. It is rated 2.2 and is part of UCI Africa Tour. The race was revived in 2016 after not being held since 2004.

In 2024 the race was renamed Tour de Tunisie International de Cyclisme, however was cancelled and did not go ahead.

== Winners ==
Year	Winner	Second	Third	Km	Points	Comments
1953	(Tunisia) Béchir Merdassi	(Algeria) André Alcaraz	(Algeria) Abdelkader Bennoui	1184	-	
1954	(Belgium) Étienne Amelijnck	(France) Jacques Bianco	(France) Paul Debadts	1427	-	
1955	(France) Jean Hobjanian	(Tunisia) Béchir Merdassi	(Algeria) André Alcaraz	1395	-	
1956-1958	No race					
1959	(Sweden) Göran Karlsson	(Netherlands) Frits Knoops	(Sweden) Knut Karlsson	1420	?	
1960	(Belgium) Stan Goossens	(Sweden) Karl Johansson	(Netherlands) Werner Swaneveld	1537	?	
1961	(France) Jean-Claude Lebaube	(East Germany) Hans Scheibner	(Sweden) Ove Adamsson	1470	?	
1962	(Soviet Union) Sergey Korge	(Sweden) Gösta Pettersson	(Netherlands) Jaap de Waard	1562	?	
1964	(Sweden) Gösta Pettersson	(France) Lucien Aimar	(Belgium) Walter Godefroot	1894	(Belgium) Walter Godefroot	
1965-1977	No race					
1978	(Morocco) Mustapha Nejjari	(Morocco) Mustapha Afandi	(Morocco) Mohamed Adlaoui	1346	?	
1979	(Tunisia) Moncef Ayed	(Tunisia) Moncef Hached	(Algeria) Hamid Chibane	1305	?	
1980	(Netherlands) Hans Koot	(Netherlands) Piet Kuijs	(Netherlands) Herman Winkel	1190	(Netherlands) Piet Kuijs	
1981	(Morocco) Mustapha Nejjari	(Morocco) Brahim Ben Bouila	(Algeria) Mehdi Aziz	1463	?	
1982	(Morocco) Mohamed Aït Oufkir	(Algeria) Abdelwahab Damergi	(Algeria) Saïd Kadri	1317	?	
1983	(East Germany) Uwe Ampler	(East Germany) Michael Prix	(East Germany) Andreas Lux	1380	?	
1984	No race					
1985	(East Germany) Frank Karrass	(Algeria) Farouk Hamza	(Tunisia) Jallel Marrouche	1058	?	
1986	(East Germany) Uwe Zeidler	(East Germany) Maik Landsmann	(East Germany) Thomas Schenderlein	968	?	
1987	(Poland) Edward Kaczmarczyk	(Poland) Mieczeslaw Pluciak	(East Germany) Thomas Schmidt	1338	?	
1988	(Poland) Zbigniew Albin	(Poland) Wieslaw Matuszek	(Poland) Pawel Bartkowiak	1282	?	
1989	(Algeria) Sebti Benzine	(Morocco) Mohamed Bilal	(Tunisia) Abderrazak Ayari	1227	?	
1990	(Tunisia) Hatem Denguir	(Tunisia) Samir Souissi	(Tunisia) Ali Marrouche	1050	(Tunisia) Mohamed Yazidi	
1991	(Tunisia) Mohamed Yazidi	(Germany) Jürgen Blümmel	(Germany) Reinhard Runge	1099	(Germany) Peter Rohracker	
1992	(Tunisia) Ali Marrouche	(Syria) Moussa Abdelhannan	(Syria) Nabhan Mohamed	1083	?	
1993	(Tunisia) Ali Marrouche	(Algeria) Ahmed Ben Jeddou	(Tunisia) Mehrez Khelifi	1100	?	
1994	(Germany) Christian Lademann	(Morocco) Abdelwahed Latrech	(Algeria) Abdelkader Rahmani	1292	(Algeria) Abdelkader Rahmani	
1995	(Tunisia) Lemjed Belkadhi	(Ukraine) Leonid Timchenko	(Tunisia) Karim Jendoubi	1339	?	
1996	(Egypt) Amr El Nadi	(Ukraine) Yuri Metlushenko	(Algeria) Nordine Haouchine	1339	?	2.6
1997	(Germany) Patrick Moster	(Germany) Marco Weber	(Germany) Ingo Moster	1279	(Ukraine) Yuri Metlushenko	2.5
1998-1999	No race					
2000	(Algeria) Hichem Mennad	(Egypt) Hisham Abdelbaki	(Algeria) Omar Slimane Zitoune	900	?	
2001	(Tunisia) Ahmed Mraihi	(Egypt) Mohamed Abdelfattah	(Algeria) Brahim El Ouaret	1053	?	
2002	(Tunisia) Ahmed Mraihi	(Egypt) Mohamed Abdelaziz	(Morocco) Driss Anezroud	849	?	
2003	(Morocco) Brahim Lachheb	(Morocco) Abdelati Saadoune	(Algeria) Redouane Salah	855	?	
2004	(South Africa) Jeremy Maartens	(Italy) Alfonso Falzarano	(Italy) Simone Biasci	1166	(South Africa) Malcolm Lange	2.5
2005-2015	No race					
2016	(Algeria) Abderrahmane Mansouri	(Morocco) Reda Aadel	(France) Thomas Vaubourzeix	550	-	2.2 UCI Africa Tour
2017	(Belgium) Matthias Legley	(France) Jérôme Pulidori	(Tunisia) Ali Nouisri	795,5	(Germany) Lucas Carstensen	2.2 UCI Africa Tour
