= Tour of Sharjah =

Emirati multi-day road cycling race

Race details
- Date: November (2013–2015); October (2016); January (2018–)
- Region: United Arab Emirates
- Discipline: Road
- Type: Stage race
- Web site: www.sharjahtour.ae

History
- First edition: 2013
- Editions: 10 (as of 2026)
- First winner: Roman Van Uden (NZL)
- Most wins: No repeat winners
- Most recent: Rein Taaramäe (EST)

The Tour of Sharjah, formerly the Sharjah International Cycling Tour, is a men's stage cycle race which takes place in the United Arab Emirates and is rated by the UCI as 2.2 from 2013 to 2015 and again since 2022 and as 2.1 from 2016 to 2018. It is part of the UCI Asia Tour. The race had a three-year hiatus after the 2018 edition, before being revived in 2022.

== Winners ==
Year	Country	Rider	Team
2013	New Zealand	Roman Van Uden	Frankies–GAC–Wolfis
2014	Moldova	Alexandre Pliușchin	Skydive Dubai Pro Cycling
2015	Morocco	Soufiane Haddi	Skydive Dubai–Al Ahli
2016	Morocco	Adil Jelloul	Skydive Dubai–Al Ahli
2017	No race		
2018	Spain	Javier Moreno	Delko–Marseille Provence KTM
2019–2021	No race		
2022	Slovenia	Grega Bole	Shabab Al Ahli Cycling Team
2023	Netherlands	Adne Van Engelen	Roojai Online Insurance
2024	Slovenia	Gal Glivar	UAE Team Emirates Gen Z
2025	New Zealand	Josh Kench	Li-Ning Star
2026	Estonia	Rein Taaramäe	Kinan Racing Team
