= Tour de la Pharmacie Centrale =

Annual cycling race in Tunisia

Race details
- Region: Tunisia
- Local name: Tour Cycliste International de la Pharmacie Centrale de Tunisie
- Discipline: Road
- Competition: UCI Africa Tour
- Type: Stage race

History
- First edition: 2006
- Editions: 4 (as of 2018)
- First winner: Hassen Ben Nasser (TUN)
- Most wins: Hassen Ben Nasser (TUN) (2 wins)
- Most recent: Gaëtan Bille (BEL)

The Tour de la Pharmacie Centrale is a cycling race held annually in Tunisia. It was part of UCI Africa Tour in category 2.2, held between 2006 and 2008, and then again in 2018.

== Winners ==
Year	Country	Rider	Team
2006	Tunisia	Hassen Ben Nasser	
2007	Tunisia	Hassen Ben Nasser	
2008	Netherlands	Thomas Nosari	
2009– 2017	No race		
2018	Belgium	Gaëtan Bille	Sovac–Natura4Ever
