= Tour des Aéroports =

Annual cycling race in Tunisia

Race details
- Region: Tunisia
- Discipline: Road
- Competition: UCI Africa Tour
- Type: Stage race

History
- First edition: 1997
- Editions: 12
- Final edition: 2010
- First winner: Lemjed Belkadhi (TUN)
- Final winner: Adil Jelloul (MAR)

The Tour des Aéroports was a cycling race held annually in Tunisia. It was part of UCI Africa Tour in category 2.2 in 2006 and 2007.

== Winners ==
Year	Country	Rider	Team
1997	Tunisia	Lemjed Belkadhi	
1998	Algeria	Omar Slimane Zitoune	
1999	Egypt	Sayed Mohammed	
2000	France	Yvonnick Bolgiani	
2001	France	Jean Charles Fabien	
2002	France	Jérôme Bouchet	
2003	France	Aurélien Passeron	AVC Aix-en-Provence
2006	Tunisia	Hassen Ben Nasser	
2007	Lebanon	Ali Ahmed Mohamed	
2008	Algeria	Cherif Merabet	
2009	Morocco	Abdelati Saadoune	
2010	Morocco	Adil Jelloul	
