= Tour of Libya =

Race details
- Region: Libya
- English name: Tour of Libya
- Discipline: Road
- Competition: UCI Africa Tour
- Type: Stage race

History
- First edition: 2007
- Editions: 3
- Final edition: 2010
- First winner: Mohamed Ali Ahmed (LBA)
- Final winner: Ahmed Belgasem (LBA)

Tour of Libya was a professional road cycling stage race held annually each March in Libya. The circuit is 860 km long. Tour of Libya was part of the UCI Africa Tour.

== Past winners ==
Year	Country	Rider	Team
2007	Libya	Mohamed Ali Ahmed	Libya A
2008	Syria	Omar Hasanein	
2009	No race		
2010	Libya	Ahmed Belgasem	Libya national team
