= Tour du Maroc =

Cycling road race In Morocco

Race details
- Date: Early March
- Region: Morocco
- English name: Tour of Morocco
- Discipline: Road race
- Competition: UCI Africa Tour
- Type: Stage race
- Web site: www.marocainecyclisme.com

History
- First edition: 1937
- Editions: 44 (as of 2024)
- First winner: Mariano Cañardo (ESP)
- Most wins: Mohamed El Gourch (MAR) (3 wins)
- Most recent: Axel Narbonne Zuccarelli (FRA)

Tour du Maroc is the most important road bicycle race in the African state of Morocco. The editions 1957–1993 were reserved to amateurs. Since 2006, it is organized as a 2.2 event on the UCI Africa Tour.

== Winners ==
Year	Country	Rider	Team
1937	Spain	Mariano Cañardo	France Sport–Dunlop
1938	Spain	Mariano Cañardo	France Sport–Dunlop
1939	France	Oreste Bernardoni	Terrot–Hutchinson
1940–1948	No race		
1949	France	André Brulé	Chaplait–Hutchinson
1950	Italy	Olimpio Bizzi	Guerra
1951	France	Attilio Redolfi	Mercier–Hutchinson
1952	Italy	Franco Giacchero	Bianchi–Pirelli
1953	Belgium	Hilaire Couvreur	Terrot–Hutchinson
1954	Switzerland	Marcel Huber	
1955	Belgium	Jan Adriaensens	
1956	No race		
1957	France	Francis Anastasi	
1958	No race		
1959	Belgium	André Bar	
1960	Morocco	Mohamed El Gourch	
1961–1963	No race		
1964	Morocco	Mohamed El Gourch	
1965	Morocco	Mohamed El Gourch	
1966	No race		
1967	Sweden	Gösta Pettersson	
1968	Sweden	Curt Söderlund	
1969	Morocco	Abderrahman Farak	
1970	No race		
1971	France	Claude Magni	
1972	Soviet Union	Valery Likhachov	
1973	No race		
1974	Soviet Union	Andris Jacobson	
1975	No race		
1976	Soviet Union	Viktor Bantchenkov	
1977–1980	No race		
1981	Czechoslovakia	Ladislav Ferebauer	
1982	No race		
1983	Germany	Andreas Petermann	
1984	No race		
1985	Soviet Union	Marat Ganeyev	
1986	No race		
1987	Soviet Union	Artūras Kasputis	
1988–1992	No race		
1993	France	Régis Simon	
1994–2000	No race		
2001	New Zealand	Nathan Dahlberg	Marco Polo Cycling Club
2002–2003	No race		
2004	South Africa	Jeremy Maartens	South Africa (national team)
2005	No race		
2006	Slovakia	Ján Šipeky	Dukla Trenčín
2007	South Africa	Nicholas White	South Africa (national team)
2008	Russia	Alexey Shchebelin	Cinelli–OPD
2009	Kazakhstan	Alexandr Dymovskikh	Brisaspor
2010	Slovenia	Dean Podgornik	Loborika
2011	Morocco	Mouhssine Lahsaini	Morocco (national team A)
2012	South Africa	Reinardt Janse van Rensburg	MTN–Qhubeka
2013	France	Mathieu Perget	CMI–Greenover
2014	France	Julien Loubet	GSC Blagnac
2015	Poland	Tomasz Marczyński	Torku Şekerspor
2016	Germany	Stefan Schumacher	Christina Jewelry Pro Cycling
2017	Morocco	Anass Aït El Abdia	Morocco (national team)
2018	France	David Rivière	Vendée U–Pays de la Loire
2019	Belgium	Laurent Évrard	Sovac
2020–2022	No race		
2024	France	Axel Narbonne Zuccarelli	Nice Métropole Côte d'Azur
