= Tour du Togo =

Race details
- Date: April
- Region: Togo
- Discipline: Road
- Type: Stage race
- Organiser: Fédération Togolaise de cyclisme

History
- First edition: 1989
- Editions: 28 (as of 2019)
- Most recent: Julian Hellmann (GER)

The Tour du Togo is a multi-day road cycling race annually held in Togo.

== Winners (since 2002) ==
Year	Winner	Second	Third
2002	(Togo) Diego Agbéfou		
2003	(Togo) Diego Agbéfou		
2004	(Togo) Komi Dossouvi	(Togo) Kouawovi Dossouvi	(Togo) Attivi Egué
2006	(Burkina Faso) Idrissa Ouedraogo		
2007	(Burkina Faso) Idrissa Ouedraogo	(Ghana) Mohammed Ahmed	(Ghana) Osouma Aminou
2008	(Ivory Coast) Bassirou Konté		
2009	(Burkina Faso) Hamidou Yaméogo		
2010	(Burkina Faso) Noufou Minoungou		
2011	(Burkina Faso) Noufou Minoungou		
2012	(Burkina Faso) Noufou Minoungou	(France) Mickaël Dhinnin	
2013	(France) Médéric Clain	(Ivory Coast) Issiaka Fofana	(France) Alexis Tourtelot
2014	(Burkina Faso) Harouna Ilboudo	(Belgium) Guy Smet	(Burkina Faso) Hamidou Yaméogo
2015	(Burkina Faso) Seydou Bamogo	(Burkina Faso) Oumarou Minoungou	(Ghana) Samuel Anim
2016	(Burkina Faso) Mathias Sorgho	(France) Mickaël Hugonnier	(Senegal) Bécaye Traoré
2017	(Ivory Coast) Issiaka Cissé	(France) Pascal Bousquet	(Netherlands) Niels van der Pijl
2018	(Burkina Faso) Abdoul Aziz Nikiéma	(Belgium) Sander Cordeel	(Ivory Coast) Karamoko Bamba
2019	(Germany) Julian Hellmann	(Burkina Faso) Paul Daumont	(Belgium) Sam Van de Mieroop
