= Mathias Sorgho =

Burkinabe road cyclist

Personal information
- Born: 11 September 1987 (age 39) Ouagadougou, Burkina Faso

Cycling career
- Sport: Cycling
- Discipline: Road
- Role: Rider

Mathias Sorgho (born 11 September 1987) is a Burkinabé road cyclist.

== Major results ==
2015
1st Overall Tour du Bénin

1st Stage 2

3rd Overall Tour du Faso
2016
1st Overall Tour du Togo

1st Stage 2

1st Overall Tour du Bénin
1st Stage 1 Tour du Faso
2nd Road race, National Road Championships
2017
1st Road race, National Road Championships
2nd Overall Tour du Bénin

1st Stage 1

3rd Overall Tour du Faso
2018
1st Overall Tour du Faso

1st Stage 4

3rd Overall Tour de Côte d'Ivoire
3rd Overall Tour of the Democratic Republic of the Congo

1st Stage 5

2019
1st Stage 2 Tour du Faso
1st Stage 3 Tour of the Democratic Republic of the Congo
2nd Overall Tour de Côte d'Ivoire

1st Stage 7

10th Road race, African Road Championships
2020
9th Overall Grand Prix Chantal Biya
