= 2008–09 UCI Africa Tour =

2007–09 UCI Africa Tour
- Fifth edition of the UCI Africa Tour

Details
- Dates: 2 October 2008–19 April 2009
- Location: Africa
- Races: 15

Champions
- Individual champion: Dan Craven (NAM) (Rapha Condor)
- Teams' champion: Barloworld
- Nations' champion: South Africa

The 2008–09 UCI Africa Tour was the fifth season of the UCI Africa Tour. The season began on 2 October 2008 with the Grand Prix Chantal Biya and ended on 19 April 2009 with the Tour du Maroc.

The points leader, based on the cumulative results of previous races, wears the UCI Africa Tour cycling jersey. Nicholas White of South Africa was the defending champion of the 2007–08 UCI Africa Tour. Dan Craven of Namibia was crowned as the 2008–09 UCI Africa Tour champion.

Throughout the season, points are awarded to the top finishers of stages within stage races and the final general classification standings of each of the stages races and one-day events. The quality and complexity of a race also determines how many points are awarded to the top finishers, the higher the UCI rating of a race, the more points are awarded. The UCI ratings from highest to lowest are as follows:

- Multi-day events: 2.HC, 2.1 and 2.2
- One-day events: 1.HC, 1.1 and 1.2

== Events ==
=== 2008 ===
Date	Race Name	Location	UCI Rating	Winner	Team
2–5 October	Grand Prix Chantal Biya	Cameroon	2.2	Thomas Rostollan (FRA)	Team Allier
11–18 October	Tour du Sénégal	Senegal	2.2	Joeri Calleeuw (BEL)	Vlaanderen-Martin
19 October	Amashovashova Classic	South Africa	1.2	Malcolm Lange (RSA)	Team MTN
24 October–2 November	Tour du Faso	Burkina Faso	2.2	Guy Smet (BEL)	Belgium (national team)
7 November	African Continental Championships – Time Trial	Morocco	CC	Jay Robert Thomson (RSA)	South Africa (national team)
9 November	African Continental Championships – Road Race	Morocco	CC	Dan Craven (NAM)	Namibia (national team)

=== 2009 ===
Date	Race Name	Location	UCI Rating	Winner	Team
13–18 January	La Tropicale Amissa Bongo Ondimbo	Gabon	2.1	Mathieu Ladagnous (FRA)	Française des Jeux
10–15 February	Tour d'Egypte	Egypt	2.2	Christoph Springer (GER)	Heraklion-Nesebar-Kastro
17 February	Grand Prix of Sharm el-Sheikh	Egypt	1.2	Ivaïlo Gabrovski (BUL)	Heraklion-Nesebar-Kastro
17–28 February	Tour du Cameroun	Cameroon	2.2	David Clarke (GBR)	Nordland-Hamburg
4 March	Giro del Capo I	South Africa	1.2	Robert Hunter (RSA)	Barloworld
5 March	Giro del Capo II	South Africa	1.2	Chris Froome (GBR)	Barloworld
6 March	Giro del Capo III	South Africa	1.2	Steve Cummings (GBR)	Barloworld
8 March	Giro del Capo IV	South Africa	1.2	Arran Brown (RSA)	Team Medscheme
10–19 April	Tour du Maroc	Morocco	2.2	Alexandr Dymovskikh (KAZ)	Brisaspor

== Final standings ==
=== Individual classification ===
Rank	Name	Points
1.	Dan Craven (NAM)	123
2.	Jamie Ball (RSA)	123
3.	Guy Smet (BEL)	92
4.	Jay Robert Thomson (RSA)	89
5.	Filipe Cardoso (POR)	87
6.	Sadrak Teguimaha (CMR)	79
7.	Daryl Impey (RSA)	78
8.	Joeri Calleeuw (BEL)	77
9.	Alexandr Dymovskikh (KAZ)	76
10.	Hassan Zahboune (MAR)	75

=== Team classification ===
Rank	Team	Points
1.	Barloworld	261
2.	MTN Cycling	195
3.	Rapha Condor	144
4.	Liberty Seguros	133
5.	House of Paint	129
6.	CCC Polsat Polkowice	109
7.	Doha Team	199
8.	Heraklion-Nessebar	88
9.	Team Neotel-Stegcomputer	86
10.	Jong Vlaanderen-Bauknecht	77

=== Nation classification ===
Rank	Nation	Points
1.	South Africa	1050.5
2.	Tunisia	453.98
3.	Algeria	309
4.	Cameroon	228
5.	Burkina Faso	141
6.	Morocco	139
7.	Libya	134
8.	Lesotho	123
9.	Namibia	123
10.	Eritrea	100

=== Nation under-23 classification ===
Rank	Nation under-23	Points
1.	South Africa	179
2.	Eritrea	46
3.	Libya	34
4.	Egypt	28
5.	Algeria	25
6.	Lesotho	12
7.	Ivory Coast	7
8.	Senegal	6
9.	Tunisia	6
