= Issiaka Cissé =

Ivorian cyclist

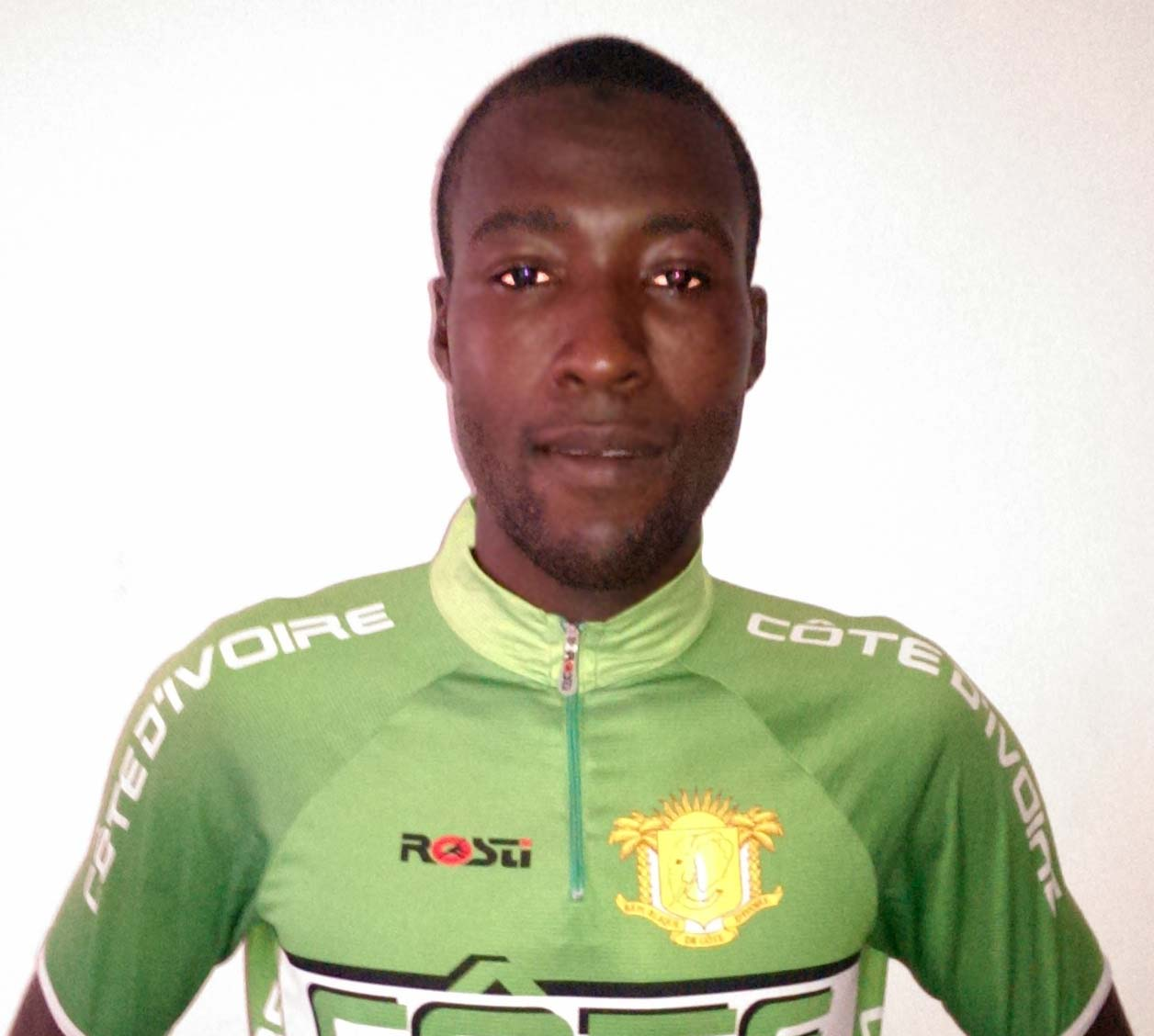

Personal information
- Born: 20 September 1991 (age 35) Ouragahio, Ivory Coast

Cycling career
- Sport: Cycling
- Current team: Team Sprinter Nice Métropole
- Discipline: Road
- Role: Rider

Amateur teams
- 2012–2014: World Cycling Centre
- 2016: SC Nice Jollywear
- 2017–2020: Cycliste Azuréen
- 2021–: Team Sprinter Nice Métropole

Issiaka Cissé (born 20 September 1991) is an Ivorian cyclist.

== Major results ==
2012
4th Overall Tour du Faso

1st Young rider classification

8th Overall Tour du Cameroun

1st Mountains classification
1st Stage 2

9th Road race, African Road Championships
2013
1st Overall Tour du Faso

1st Stage 3

7th Overall La Tropicale Amissa Bongo
10th Overall Grand Prix Chantal Biya

1st Points classification
1st Mountains classification
1st Stages 3 & 4

2014
3rd Road race, National Road Championships
7th Overall Grand Prix Chantal Biya
2015
5th Overall Tour du Cameroun
2016
3rd Overall Tour de Côte d'Ivoire

1st Stage 5 (ITT)

4th Overall Grand Prix Chantal Biya

1st Points classification
1st Stage 1

6th Overall Tour du Cameroun
2017
1st Stage 1 Tour du Cameroun
9th Overall La Tropicale Amissa Bongo
2018
1st Overall Tour de Côte d'Ivoire

1st Stages 3, 4 (ITT) & 5

3rd Overall Grand Prix Chantal Biya

1st Stage 3

5th Overall Tour du Cameroun

1st Stage 6

2019
2nd Overall Tour du Cameroun

1st Stage 3

2020
5th Overall Grand Prix Chantal Biya
2021
1st Stage 4 Tour du Faso
