= 2027 UCI Africa Tour =

23nd season of the UCI Africa Tour

- Twenty-third edition of the UCI Africa Tour

Details
- Dates: 30 October 2026 – 17 June 2027
- Location: Africa
- Races: 4

The 2027 UCI Africa Tour will be the 23nd season of the UCI Africa Tour. The season will begin on 30 October 2026 with the Tour du Faso and will end in 19 June 2027 with Classique of Mauritius.

There are returning races not in 2026 season, such as Tour du Faso. There are also races in 2026 not returning to the 2027 season. As the season progresses, races may be added to the calendar, changed dates or removed from the calendar.

Throughout the season, points are awarded to the top finishers of stages within stage races and the final general classification standings of each of the stages races and one-day events. The quality and complexity of a race also determine how many points were awarded to the top finishers: the higher the UCI rating of a race, the more points are awarded. The UCI ratings from highest to lowest are as follows:

- Multi-day events: 2.1 and 2.2
- One-day events: 1.1 and 1.2

== Events ==
Races in the 2027 UCI Africa Tour
Race	Rating	Date	Winner	Team	Ref
(Burkina Faso) Tour du Faso	2.2	30 October – 8 November 2026	Paul Daumont (BUR)	Burkina Faso (national team)	
Tour du Rwanda	2.1	21–26 February 2027			
(Rwanda) Kigalian Classic	1.1	28 February 2027			
(Algeria) Tour d'Algérie	2.2	8–14 April 2027			
(Benin) Grand Prix de Cotonou	1.2	25 April 2027			
(Benin) Tour du Bénin	2.2	27 April – 2 May 2027			
Tour of Mauritius	2.2	15–17 June 2027			
Classique of Mauritius	2.2	19 June 2027			
