= Clovis Kamzong =

Cameroonian cyclist

Personal information
- Full name: Clovis Kamzong Abessolo
- Born: October 9, 1991 (age 35) Douala, Cameroon

Cycling career
- Sport: Cycling
- Current team: SNH Velo Club
- Discipline: Road
- Role: Rider

Amateur teams
- 2014: ACV Aurilllacois
- 2015–: SNH Velo Club

Clovis Kamzong Abessolo (born October 9, 1991) is a Cameroonian cyclist who currently rides for amateur team SNH Velo Club.

== Major results ==
2012
4th Overall Tour du Cameroun
4th Overall Grand Prix Chantal Biya
2014
3rd Overall Grand Prix Chantal Biya

1st Stage 3

5th Overall Tour du Cameroun

1st Young rider classification
1st Stage 4

2015
1st Overall Tour du Cameroun

1st Points classification
1st Stages 1 & 3

1st Stage 2 Grand Prix Chantal Biya
2016
1st Stage 3 Tour du Cameroun
6th Overall Grand Prix Chantal Biya
7th Overall Tour de Côte d'Ivoire
2017
1st Overall Grand Prix Chantal Biya

1st Stage 2

2018
1st Stage 1 Tour du Cameroun
2nd Overall Grand Prix Chantal Biya

1st Points classification
1st Stage 5

2nd Overall Tour de Côte d'Ivoire
10th Overall Tour du Faso
2019
5th Overall Tour du Cameroun

1st Stages 2 & 8

8th Overall Grand Prix Chantal Biya
2020
1st Stage 4 La Tropicale Amissa Bongo
3rd Overall Grand Prix Chantal Biya
2021
1st Road race, National Road Championships
1st Overall Tour du Cameroun
3rd Overall Grand Prix Chantal Biya
2022
2nd Road race, National Road Championships
3rd Overall Grand Prix Chantal Biya
4th Overall Tour du Bénin
2023
3rd Overall Tour du Bénin
5th Overall Grand Prix Chantal Biya
6th Overall Tour du Cameroun
10th Overall Tour du Faso
2024
1st Road race, National Road Championships
1st Overall Tour du Cameroun

1st Stages 1 & 5
