= Paul Daumont =

Burkinabé cyclist

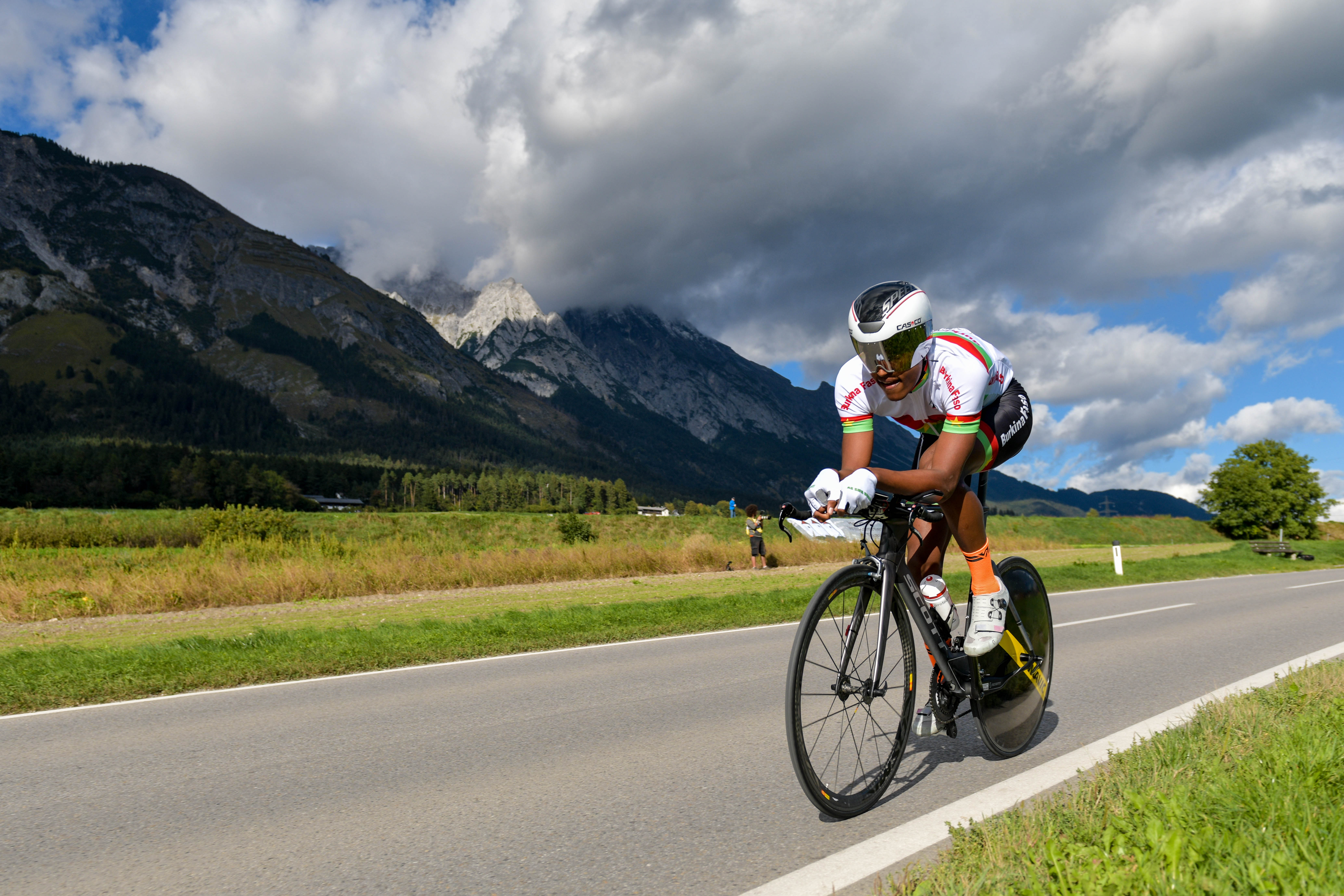
- Daumont at the 2018 UCI Road World Championships

Personal information
- Born: 1 September 1999 (age 27) Bangui, Central African Republic

Cycling career
- Sport: Cycling
- Current team: Occitane CF
- Discipline: Road
- Role: Rider

Amateur teams
- 2017–2018: SIFA Bobo–Dioulasso
- 2018: World Cycling Centre
- 2019: AS Bessel
- 2021: World Cycling Centre
- 2022–: Occitane CF

Paul Daumont (born 1 September 1999) is a Burkinabé road cyclist. Although born in the Central African Republic to a French father and a Central African mother, he was selected by Burkina Faso to compete in the road race at the 2020 Summer Olympics.

== Major results ==
2018
2nd Road race, National Under-23 Road Championships
7th Overall Tour du Faso
7th Overall Tour de l'Espoir
2019
1st Road race, National Under-23 Road Championships
1st Overall Tour de Côte d'Ivoire

1st Stages 1 & 3 (ITT)

2nd Road race, National Road Championships
2nd Overall Tour du Togo

1st Stage 3

3rd Road race, African Under-23 Road Championships
2020
1st GP 14-Ouagadrogou
4th Overall Grand Prix Chantal Biya

1st Stages 2 & 5

2021
1st Road race, National Road Championships
1st Road race, National Under-23 Road Championships
1st Overall Tour du Bénin

1st Stages 1, 2, 3 & 6

1st GP Cham-Hagendorn
Tour du Cameroun

1st Points classification
1st Stages 2 & 8

1st Stages 2 & 5 Tour du Mali
3rd Time trial, African Under-23 Road Championships
5th Overall Tour du Faso

1st Young rider classification

2022
1st GP 14-Ouagadrogou
1st Grand Prix Abidjan
1st GP Dafani
2nd Overall Tour de Côte d'Ivoire

1st Stages 1, 3 & 4

4th Overall Tour du Cameroun

1st Young rider classification

2023
1st Road race, National Road Championships
4th Road race, Jeux de la Francophonie
African Road Championships

7th Time trial
9th Road race

2024
1st Road race, National Road Championships
