= Rasmané Ouédraogo =

Burkinabé cyclist

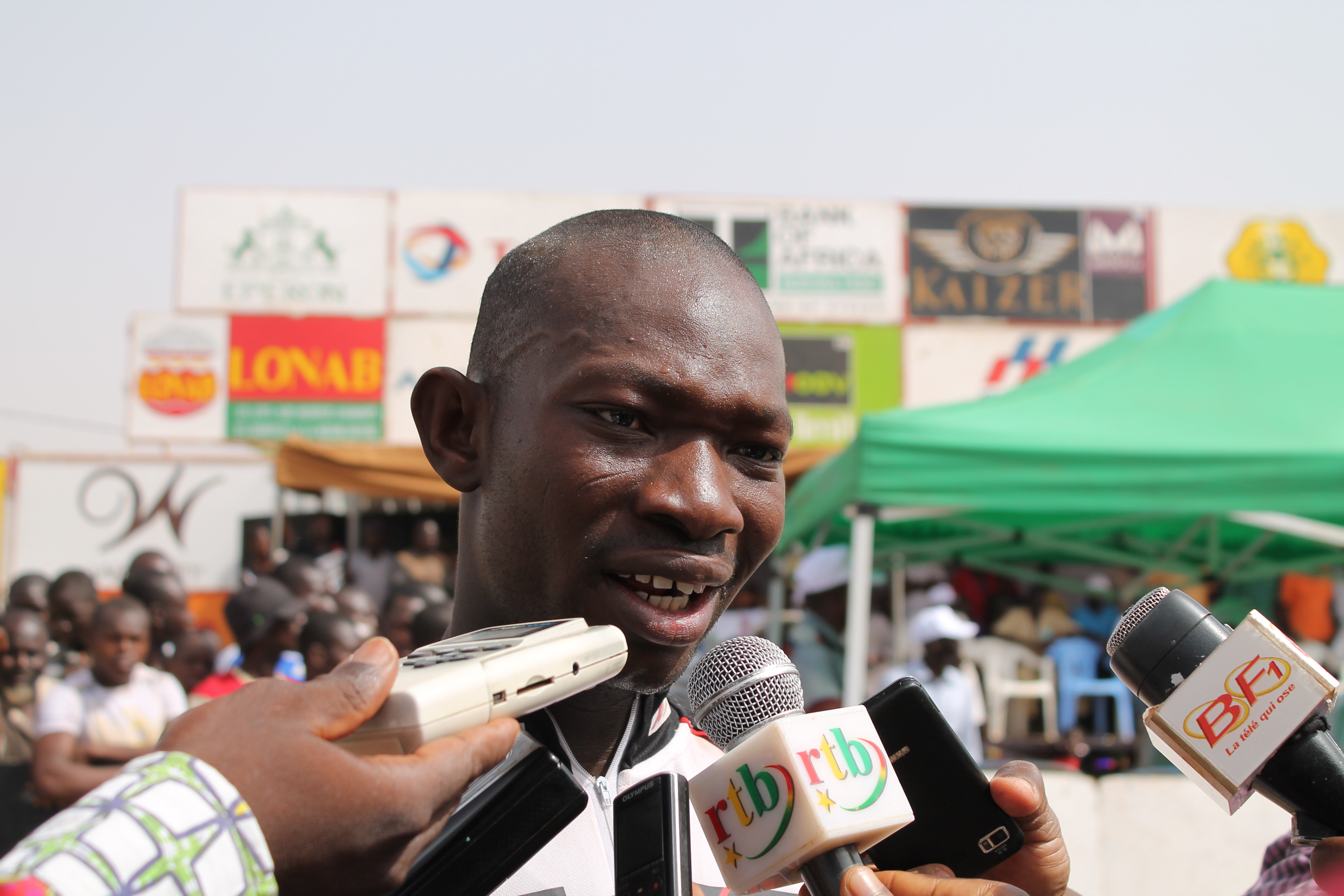
- Ouédraogo in 2013

Personal information
- Born: 30 July 1988 (age 38) Bobo-Dioulasso, Burkina Faso

Cycling career
- Sport: Cycling
- Current team: Retired
- Discipline: Road
- Role: Rider

Amateur teams
- 2006–2008: Région du Nord
- 2008–2013: Tan Aliz

Rasmané Ouédraogo (born 30 July 1988) is a Burkinabé former professional cyclist.

== Major results ==
2009
7th Overall Tour du Faso
2010
2nd Overall Tour du Faso
5th Overall Tour du Cameroun

1st Stage 1

8th Overall Tour du Mali
2011
3rd Road race, National Road Championships
3rd Overall Tour du Cameroun

1st Stage 5

3rd Overall Tour du Faso

1st Young rider classification
1st Stage 8

9th Challenge Youssoufia, Challenge des phosphates
2012
1st Road race, National Road Championships
1st Overall Tour du Faso
4th Team time trial, African Road Championships
2013
2nd Road race, National Road Championships
4th Overall Tour du Faso
5th Team time trial, African Road Championships
2014
2nd Road race, National Road Championships
7th Trophée de la Maison Royale, Challenge du Prince
2015
Tour of the Democratic Republic of Congo

1st Stages 5 & 8

1st Stage 10 Tour du Faso
2nd Overall Tour du Cameroun
8th Team time trial, African Road Championships
