= Joseph Sanda =

Cameroonian cyclist (1985–2020)

Personal information
- Born: 9 May 1985 Mora, Cameroon
- Died: 7 December 2020 (aged 35) Yaoundé, Cameroon

Cycling career
- Sport: Cycling

Amateur team
- ?–?: SNH Vélo Club

Joseph Sanda (9 May 1985 – 7 December 2020) was a Cameroonian racing cyclist. He was part of the SNH Vélo Club as an amateur, then became one of its coaches.

Sanda died on 7 December 2020 in Yaoundé following an illness.

== Awards ==
=== 2004 ===
- 3rd place in the Cameroon Road Championships

=== 2006 ===
- Winner of the 2nd and 9th stages of International East Tour

=== 2007 ===
- Winner of the 6th stage of the International East Tour
- Winner of the Prologue of the Grand Prix Chantal Biya

=== 2008 ===
- Winner of the 1st stage of the Tour du Cameroun

=== 2009 ===
- Winner of the 10th stage of the Tour du Cameroun
- Winner of the 4th stage of the International East Tour
- Winner of the 2nd stage of the Grand Prix Chantal Biya
- 2nd place in the Grand Prix Chantal Biya
