= Cordeel =

Cordeel is a surname. Notable people with the surname include:

- Amaury Cordeel (born 2002), Belgian racing driver
- Sander Cordeel (born 1987), Belgian cyclist
