= Martinien Tega =

Cameroonian cyclist

Martienien Tega
Personal information
- Born: 11 December 1981 (age 44) Douala, Cameroon

Cycling career
- Sport: Cycling
- Discipline: Road
- Role: Rider

Martinien Tega (born 11 December 1981) is a Cameroonian cyclist.

== Major results ==
2003
2nd Overall Grand Prix Chantal Biya
1st Stage 7 Tour du Sénégal
2004
1st National Road Race Championships
1st Overall Tour du Cameroun

1st Stage 3

2006
2nd Overall Tour du Faso
2008
1st Stage 3 Tour du Sénégal
1st Stage 3 Tour du Cameroun
2nd Overall Tour du Cameroun
5th Overall Tour du Faso
2009
1st Stage 2 Tour du Cameroun
1st Stage 3 Grand Prix Chantal Biya
3rd National Road Race Championships
2010
1st Overall Grand Prix Chantal Biya

1st Stage 1

3rd Overall Tour du Cameroun
2011
2nd Overall Tour du Cameroun
2nd Overall Tour du Faso
