= Issiaka =

Issiaka is a masculine given name. Notable people with the name include:

- Issiaka Eliassou (born 1985), Malian footballer
- Issiaka Fofana (born 1982), Ivorian cyclist
- Issiaka Kamate (born 2004), French footballer
- Issiaka Koudize (born 1987), Nigerien footballer
- Issiaka Ouédraogo (born 1988), Burkinabé footballer
