= Peter van Agtmaal =

Dutch bicycle racer

Personal information
- Full name: Peter van Agtmaal
- Born: January 25, 1982 (age 44) Huijbergen, Netherlands

Cycling career
- Sport: Cycling
- Discipline: Road
- Role: Rider

Amateur team
- 2008–2010: Metec

Professional teams
- 2002: Bert Story–Piels
- 2003–2004: Axa Pro Cycling Team
- 2006–2007: Fondas–P3 Transfer
- 2011: Ubbink–Koga

Peter van Agtmaal (born 25 January 1982 in Huijbergen) is a Dutch former professional cyclist.

== Major results ==
2000
1st Time trial, National Junior Road Championships
2002
1st Omloop van het Waasland
1st Memorial Philippe Van Coningsloo
2003
Tour du Faso

1st Stages 5 & 9

2004
1st PWZ Zuidenveld Tour
1st Stage 1 Tour du Sénégal
3rd Schaal Sels
2005
Tour d'Indonesia

1st Stages 4, 5 & 7

2006
2nd Overall Tour de Gironde

1st Stage 3

2007
1st Overall Grand Prix Chantal Biya

1st Stage 1

2008
1st Stage 2 Tour of Romania
2009
1st Overall Grand Prix Chantal Biya

1st Stage 1

2010
1st Stage 1 Tour du Faso
