= Issiaka Fofana =

Ivorian cyclist

Personal information
- Born: 11 May 1982 (age 44) Ouragahio, Ivory Coast

Cycling career
- Sport: Cycling
- Discipline: Road
- Role: Rider

Issiaka Fofana (born 11 May 1982) is an Ivorian cyclist.

== Major results ==
2006
1st National Time Trial Championships
3rd National Road Race Championships
2008
1st Stage 7 Boucle du Coton
2009
1st National Road Race Championships
2011
1st National Road Race Championships
2012
1st Overall Tour de Côte d'Ivoire

1st Stages 1 & 2

3rd Overall Tour du Cameroun
2014
4th Overall Tour du Cameroun
2016
6th Overall Tour du Faso
