= Abou Sanogo =

Ivorian cyclist

Personal information
- Born: 20 December 1994 (age 31) Ivory Coast

Cycling career
- Sport: Cycling
- Discipline: Road
- Role: Rider

Amateur team
- 2018: Team World Cycling Centre Africa

Abou Sanogo (born 20 December 1994) is an Ivorian cyclist.

== Major results ==
2015
National Road Championships

1st Road race
1st Under-23 road race

2016
1st Stage 7 Tour de Côte d'Ivoire
2nd Road race, National Road Championships
2nd Overall Tour du Bénin
2017
5th Overall Tour du Faso

1st Stages 1 & 9

2018
8th Overall Tour de Côte d'Ivoire

1st Stage 6

9th Overall Tour du Faso
2022
3rd Road race, National Road Championships
3rd Overall Tour de Côte d'Ivoire

1st Stage 7
