= Yves Ngue Ngock =

Cameroonian cyclist

Personal information
- Born: 25 January 1989 (age 37) Edéa, Cameroon

Cycling career
- Sport: Cycling
- Discipline: Road
- Role: Rider

Yves Ngue Ngock (born 25 January 1989) is a Cameroonian cyclist.

== Palmares ==
2008
1st Prologue Grand Prix Chantal Biya
2009
1st Prologue Grand Prix Chantal Biya
2011
1st Grand Prix Chantal Biya

1st Stage 1

2012
1st Tour du Cameroun
1st Stage 1 Grand Prix Chantal Biya
2013
1st Grand Prix Chantal Biya

1st Stage 1
