= Jamie Ball =

South African cyclist (born 1979)

Personal information
- Born: 1 September 1979 (age 47) Pretoria, South Africa

Cycling career
- Sport: Cycling
- Current team: Retired
- Discipline: Road
- Role: Rider

Amateur team
- 2010: DCM Chrome

Professional teams
- 2001–2002: Team IBM–Lotus Development
- 2003–2006: Team HSBC
- 2007: MTN
- 2008–2009: House of Paint

Jamie Ball (born 1 September 1979) is a South African former professional racing cyclist. In 2009 he won the South African National Road Race Championships.

== Major results ==
2005
3rd Overall Tour d'Egypte

1st Stages 3 (TTT), 5 & 7

4th Road race, National Road Championships
2009
1st Road race, National Road Championships
2nd Overall UCI Africa Tour
7th Overall La Tropicale Amissa Bongo
2010
1st Stage 3 Tour de Filipinas
