= Ernest Zongo =

Burkinabé cyclist

Personal information
- Born: January 1, 1964 Ouahigouya, Burkina Faso
- Died: July 9, 2024 (aged 60) Ouagadougou, Burkina Faso

Cycling career
- Sport: Cycling
- Current team: Retired
- Discipline: Road
- Role: Rider

Ernest Zongo (January 1, 1964 – July 9, 2024) was a Burkinabé cyclist.

== Major results ==
1993
2nd Tour du Faso
1995
1st Tour du Faso
1997
1st Tour du Faso
