= Dieter Bouvry =

Belgian cyclist (born 1992)

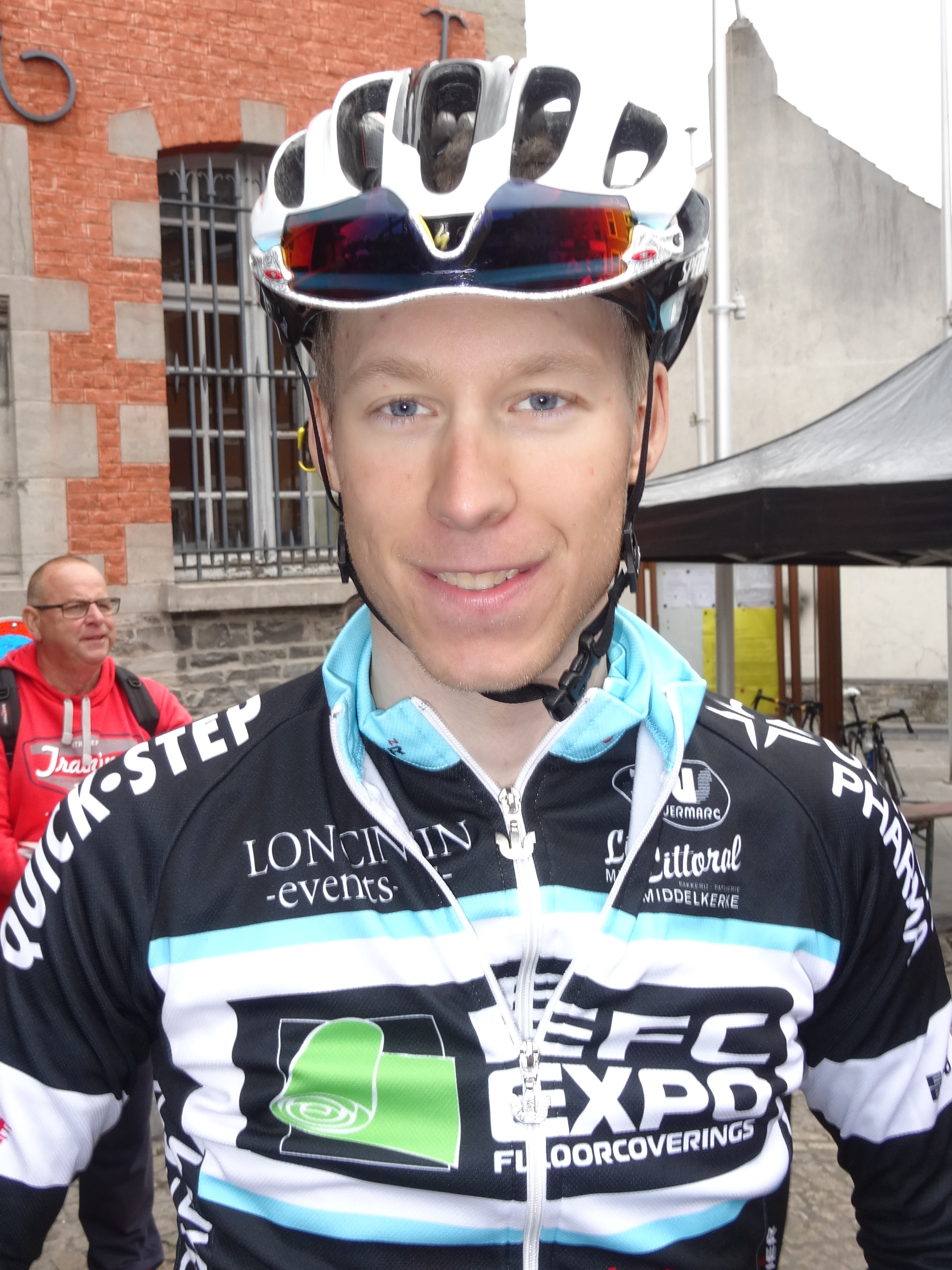
- Bouvry in 2014

Personal information
- Born: 31 July 1992 (age 34) Roeselare, Belgium

Cycling career
- Sport: Cycling
- Current team: Retired
- Discipline: Road
- Role: Rider

Amateur teams
- 2011–2012: EFC–Quick Step
- 2014: EFC–Omega Pharma–Quick Step

Professional teams
- 2013: Etixx–IHNed
- 2015–2016: Roubaix–Lille Métropole
- 2017: Pauwels Sauzen–Vastgoedservice
- 2018–2019: Cibel–Cebon

Dieter Bouvry (born 31 July 1992) is a Belgian former professional racing cyclist. He rode at the 2013 UCI Road World Championships.

== Major results ==
2009
5th Omloop der Vlaamse Gewesten
7th Overall Keizer der Juniores
2010
3rd Grand Prix Bati-Metallo
3rd Overall Keizer der Juniores
8th Overall Regio-Tour
10th Paris–Roubaix Juniors
2012
4th Liège–Bastogne–Liège U23
10th Grand Prix des Marbriers
2013
5th Overall Czech Cycling Tour
6th Overall Volta ao Alentejo
6th Kattekoers
6th Puchar Uzdrowisk Karpackich
7th Overall Course de Solidarność et des Champions Olympiques
2015
9th Gooikse Pijl
2016
1st Paris–Chauny
5th Overall Ronde de l'Oise
2017
1st Overall Tour de Cote d'Ivoire
