= Guy Smet =

Belgian cyclist

Personal information
- Born: 4 February 1972 (age 54) Beveren-Waas, Belgium

Cycling career
- Sport: Cycling
- Discipline: Road
- Role: Rider

Amateur teams
- 2007–2008: Wimi Games-Sint-Martinus
- 2009–2013: PWC Jan Snel
- 2016: Avia WCup
- 2017–2018: DCR Cycling Team
- 2020–2022: DCR Cycling Team

Professional team
- 2014–2015: Cibel

Guy Smet (born 4 February 1972 in Beveren-Waas) is a Belgian cyclist, who last rode for club team DCR Cycling Team.

== Major results ==
2007
6th Overall Tour du Faso

1st Stage 7

2008
1st Overall Tour du Faso

1st Stages 1 & 10

2009
3rd Overall UCI Africa Tour
2011
1st Stage 6 Tour of Rwanda
2015
3rd Overall Tour de Côte d'Ivoire
2016
9th Overall Tour du Sénégal
2018
1st Stage 6 (TTT) Tour du Faso
