= Samuel Anim =

Ghanaian cyclist

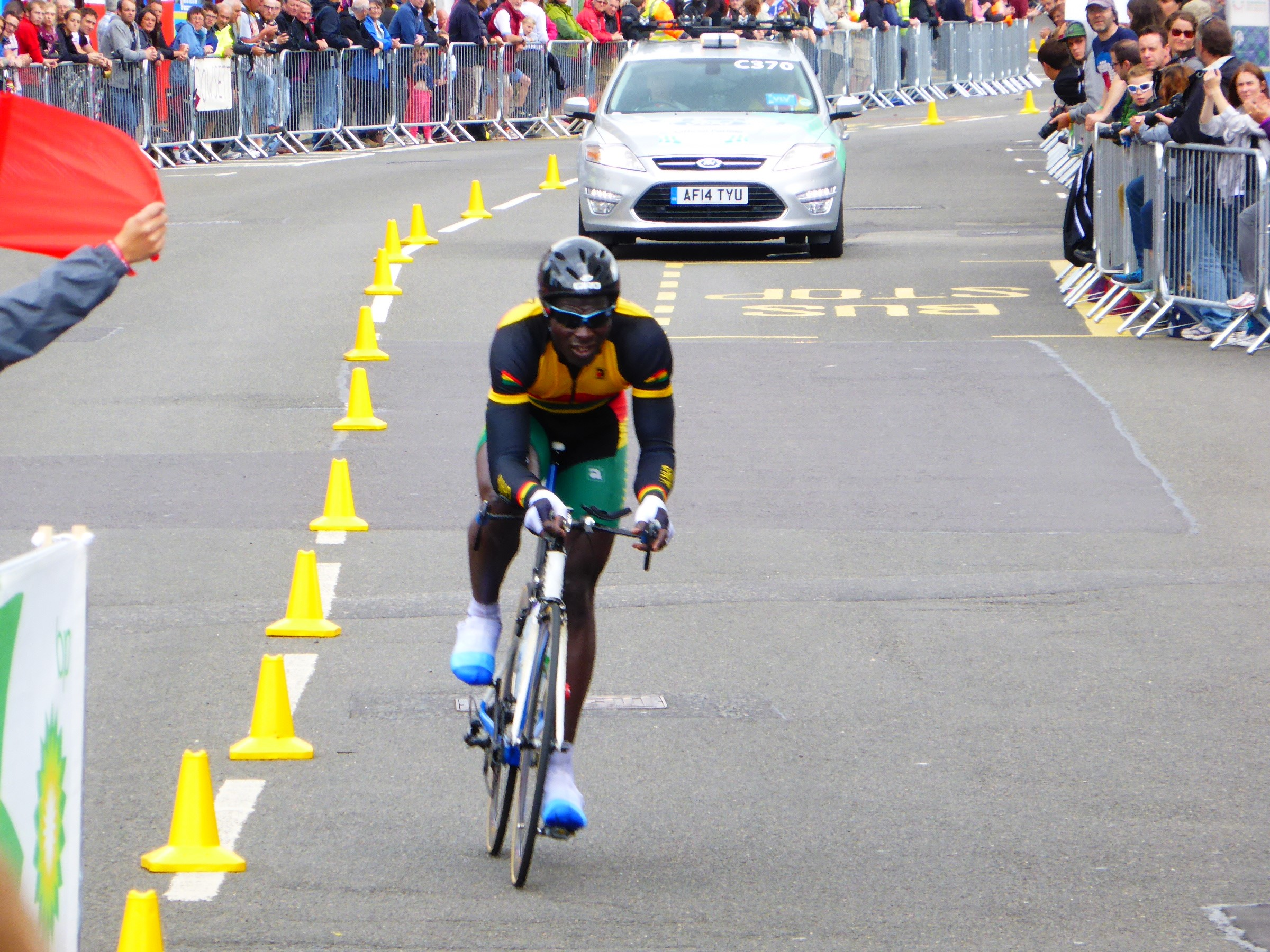
- Anim at the 2014 Commonwealth Games

Personal information
- Born: 11 September 1987 (age 39) Accra, Ghana
- Died: 1 August 2015 (aged 26)

Cycling career
- Sport: Cycling
- Discipline: Road
- Role: Rider

Samuel Anim (20 July 1989 in Accra – 1 August 2015) was a Ghanaian road bicycle racer. In 2009, won the Ghanaian national road race championships. During his career, he also won stages of the Tour du Togo, the Tour du Bénin and the Tour du Ghana.

On August 1, 2015, Anim was hit and killed by a motorcycle during a training ride.
