= Boucle du Coton =

Race details
- Date: May
- Region: Burkina Faso
- Discipline: Road
- Competition: UCI Africa Tour
- Type: Stage race

History
- First edition: 2005
- Editions: 7
- Final edition: 2011
- First winner: Gueswendé Sawadogo (BUR)
- Most wins: Gueswendé Sawadogo (BUR) (2 wins)
- Final winner: Harouna Ilboudo (BUR)

The Boucle du Coton was a cycling race held annually in Burkina Faso. It was part of UCI Africa Tour in category 2.2.

== Winners ==
Year	Country	Rider	Team
2005	Burkina Faso	Gueswendé Sawadogo	
2006	Burkina Faso	Rabaki Jérémie Ouédraogo	
2007	Burkina Faso	Saïdou Rouamba	
2008	Burkina Faso	Gueswendé Sawadogo	
2009	Burkina Faso	Saïdou Tall	
2010	Burkina Faso	Fatao Sawadago	
2011	Burkina Faso	Harouna Ilboudo	
