= Harouna Ilboudo =

Burkinabé cyclist

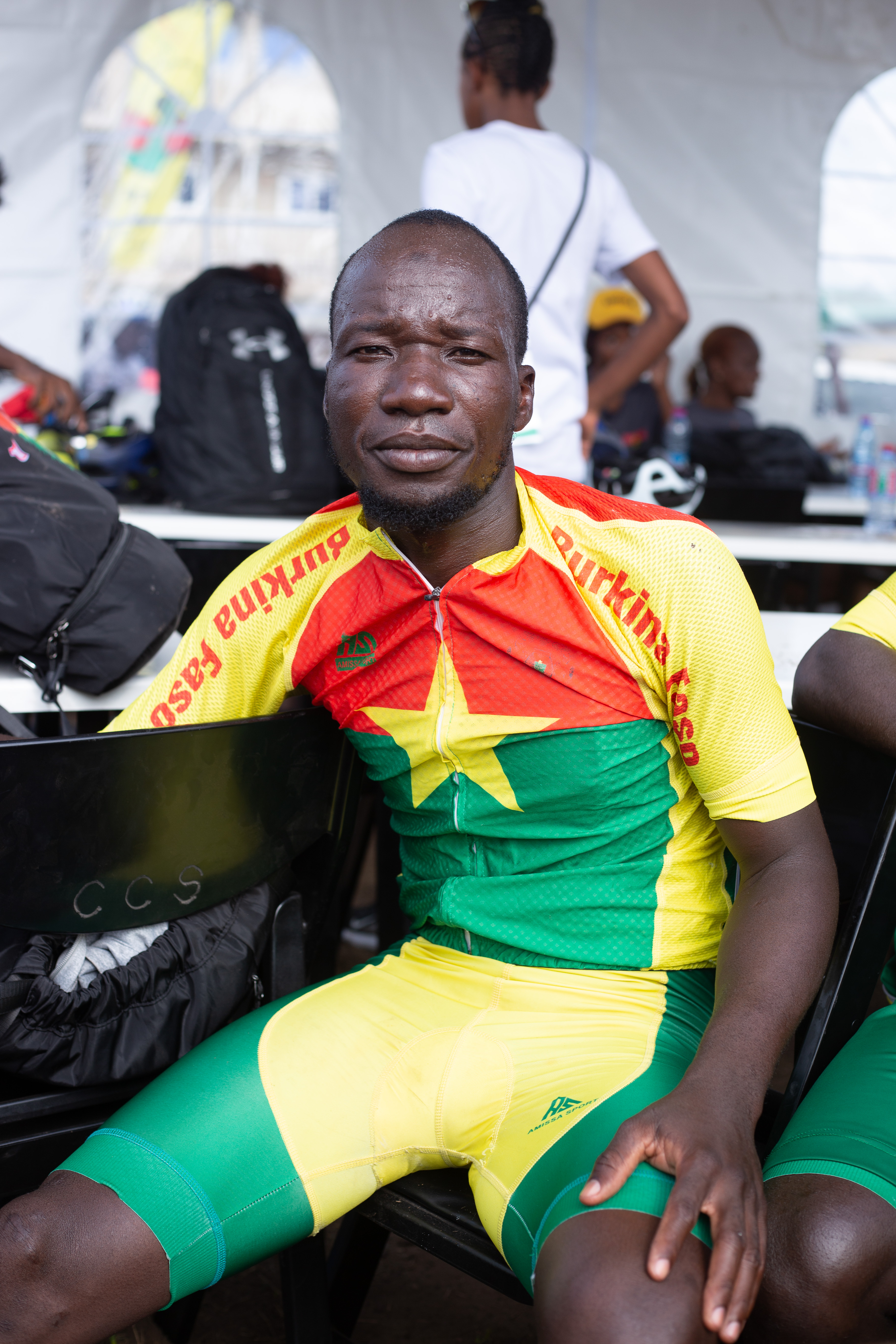

Personal information
- Born: 31 December 1986 (age 39) Burkina Faso

Cycling career
- Sport: Cycling
- Discipline: Road
- Role: Rider

Harouna Ilboudo (born 31 December 1986) is a Burkinabé cyclist.

== Palmares ==
2011
1st Overall Boucle du Coton

1st Stage 2

2013
1st Stages 1 & 4 Tour du Togo
2014
1st Overall Tour du Togo
2016
1st Overall Tour du Faso
