= Sander Cordeel =

Belgian cyclist

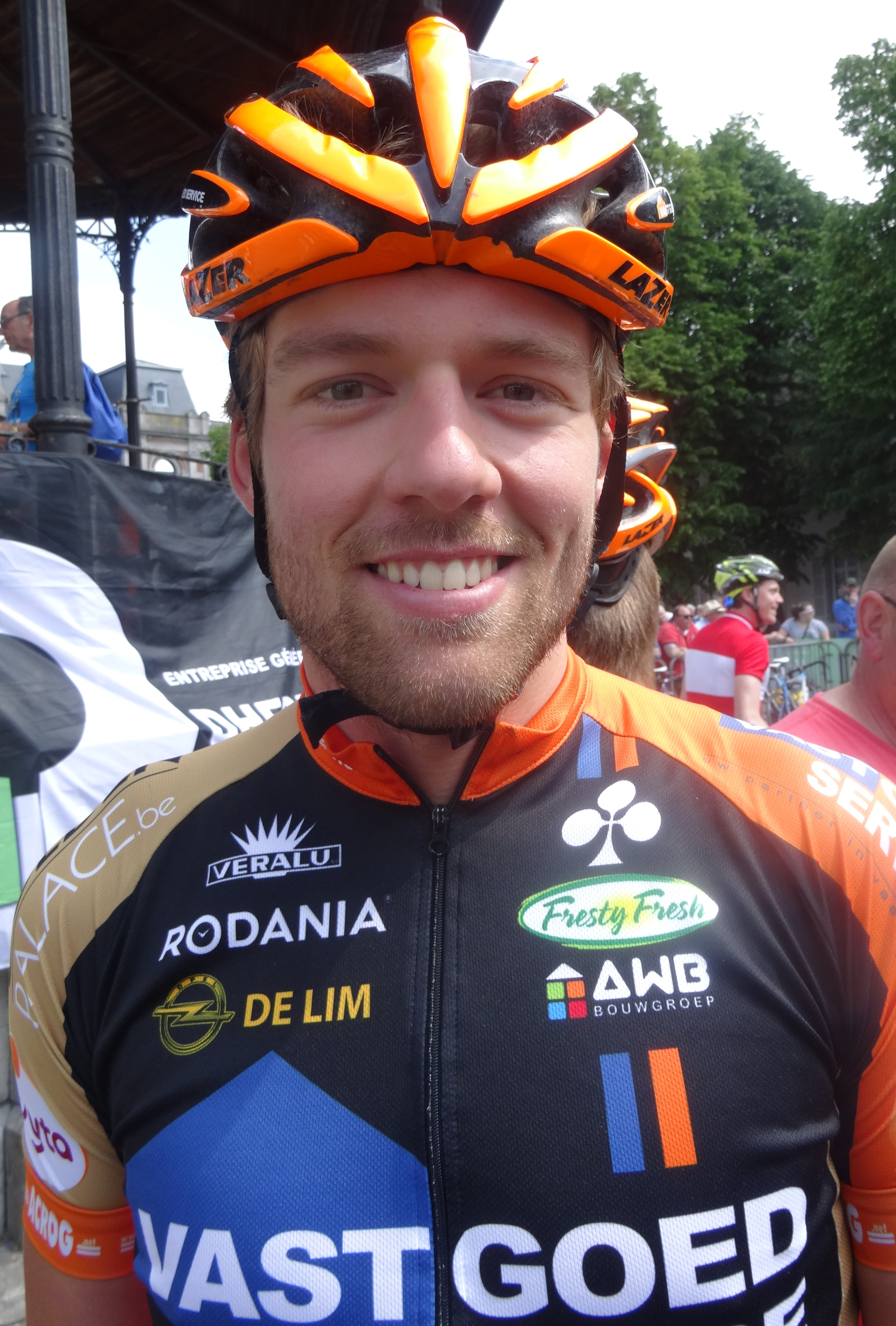
- Cordeel at the 2014 Grand Prix Criquielion

Personal information
- Full name: Sander Cordeel
- Born: 7 November 1987 (age 38) Sint-Niklaas, Belgium
- Height: 1.87 m (6 ft 2 in)
- Weight: 80 kg (180 lb)

Cycling career
- Sport: Cycling
- Discipline: Road
- Role: Rider

Amateur teams
- 2008–2010: Rock Werchter–Chocolade Jacques
- 2018–2023: DCR Cycling Team

Professional teams
- 2006: Bodysol–Win for Life–Jong Vlaanderen
- 2011: Colba–Mercury
- 2012–2013: Lotto–Belisol
- 2014–2015: Vastgoedservice–Golden Palace
- 2016–2017: Verandas Willems

Sander Cordeel (born 7 November 1987) is a Belgian road bicycle racer, who last rode for Belgian amateur team DCR Cycling Team.

== Major results ==
2005
1st Points classification, Sint-Martinusprijs Kontich
2008
1st Stage 1 Triptyque Ardennais
10th Overall Le Triptyque des Monts et Châteaux
2010
2nd Overall Tour de Liège
2011
1st GP Impanis-Van Petegem
6th Zellik–Galmaarden
6th Internationale Wielertrofee Jong Maar Moedig
2013
1st Mountains classification, Tour of Norway
2014
1st Overall Tour de Namur
7th Kattekoers
2016
10th Duo Normand
2018
2nd Overall Tour du Togo

1st Stages 2, 4 & 6
