= Tour de Côte d'Ivoire =

Cycling race in the Ivory Coast

Race details
- Region: Ivory Coast
- Discipline: Road
- Competition: UCI Africa Tour
- Type: Stage race

History
- First edition: 1953
- First winner: Jean Gainche (FRA)
- Most wins: Jean Gainche (FRA); Issiaka Cissé (CIV) (3 wins)
- Most recent: Paul Daumont (BUR)

The Tour de Côte d'Ivoire-Tour de la Réconciliation is a cycling stage race held in the Ivory Coast. It was on the UCI Africa Tour from 2015 until 2018 as a 2.2 event.

== Winners ==
Year	Country	Rider	Team
1953	France	Jean Gainche	
1954	France	Jean Gainche	
1957	France	Raphaël Géminiani	
1959	France	Jean Gainche	
1963	France	Ange Roussel	
1964	Ivory Coast	Oscar Michel	
2012	Ivory Coast	Issiaka Fofana	
2013	Ivory Coast	Issiaka Cissé	
2014	Ivory Coast	Issiaka Cissé	
2015	Morocco	Mouhssine Lahsaini	Al Marakeb Cycling Team
2016	Morocco	Mohcine El Kouraji	
2017	Belgium	Dieter Bouvry	Flanders (regional team)
2018	Ivory Coast	Issiaka Cissé	Cycliste Azuréen
2019	Burkina Faso	Paul Daumont	
2021	Ivory Coast	Abou Sanogo	
