= Tour du Cameroun =

Cameroonian multi-day road cycling race

Race details
- Region: Cameroon
- Discipline: Road
- Competition: UCI Africa Tour
- Type: Stage race

History
- First edition: 2003
- Editions: 22 (as of 2026)
- First winner: Ivan Terenine (RUS)
- Most wins: Clovis Kamzong (CMR); (3 wins)
- Most recent: Rodrigue Nounawe (CMR)

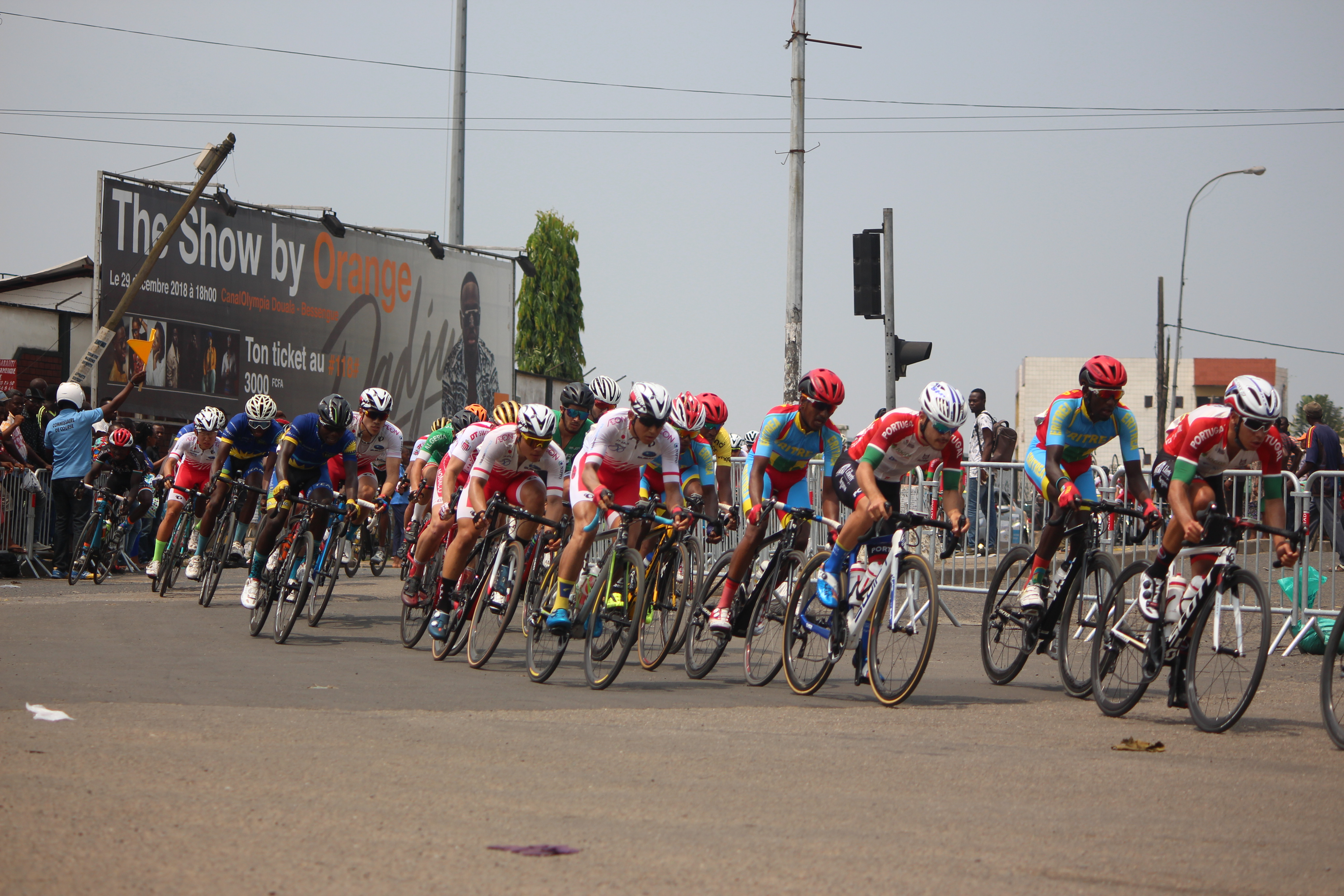
International Cycling Tour in Douala, Cameroon

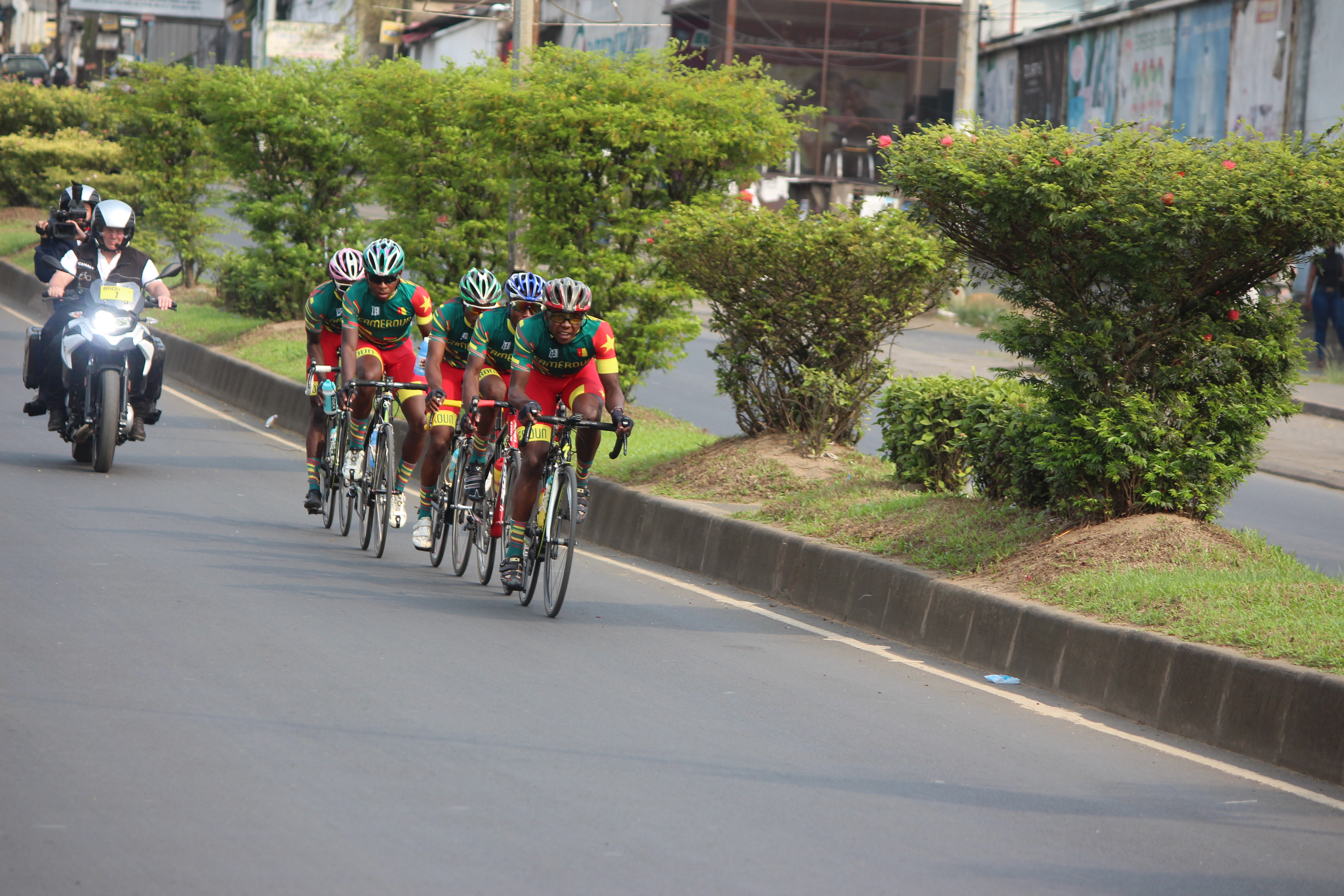
National Cycling Tour in Douala, Cameroon

The Tour du Cameroun is a cycling race held annually since 2003 in Cameroon. It is part of UCI Africa Tour and is rated a 2.2 event.

== Winners ==
| Year | Country | Rider | Team |
|---|---|---|---|
| 2003 | Russia | Ivan Terenine | |
| 2004 | Cameroon | Martinien Tega | |
| 2005 | Italy | Davide Silvestri | |
| 2006 | Kazakhstan | Pavel Nevdakh | |
| 2007 | France | Flavien Chipault | |
| 2008 | Cameroon | Joseph Sanda | |
| 2009 | Great Britain | David Clarke | |
| 2010 | Slovakia | Milan Barényi | |
| 2011 | Burkina Faso | Oumarou Minougou | |
| 2012 | Cameroon | Yves Ngue Ngock | |
| 2013 | No race | | |
| 2014 | Namibia | Dan Craven | Bike Aid–Ride for Help |
| 2015 | Cameroon | Clovis Kamzong | SNH Vélo Club |
| 2016 | Morocco | Mohammed Errafai | |
| 2017 | Germany | Nikodemus Holler | Bike Aid |
| 2018 | Rwanda | Bonaventure Uwizeyimana | Skol Rwanda |
| 2019 | Bulgaria | Radoslav Konstantinov | |
| 2020 | No race due to the COVID-19 pandemic | | |
| 2021 | Cameroon | Clovis Kamzong | SNH Vélo Club |
| 2022 | Rwanda | Moise Mugisha | Rwanda (national team) |
| 2023 | Morocco | Mohcine El Kouraji | Morocco (national team) |
| 2024 | Cameroon | Clovis Kamzong | SNH Vélo Club |
| 2025 | Algeria | Islam Mansouri | Algeria (national team) |
| 2026 | Cameroon | Rodrigue Nounawe | SNH Vélo Club |

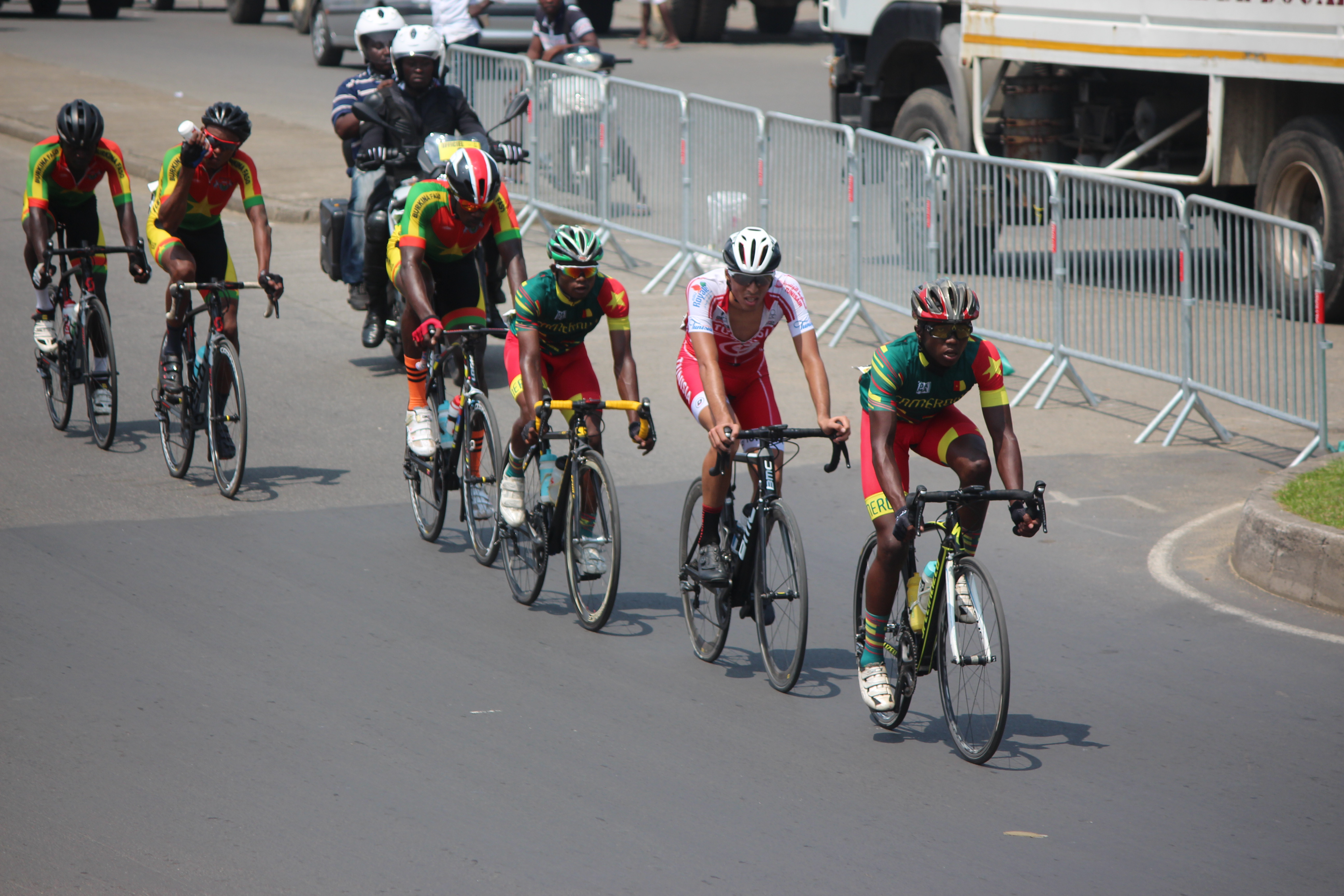

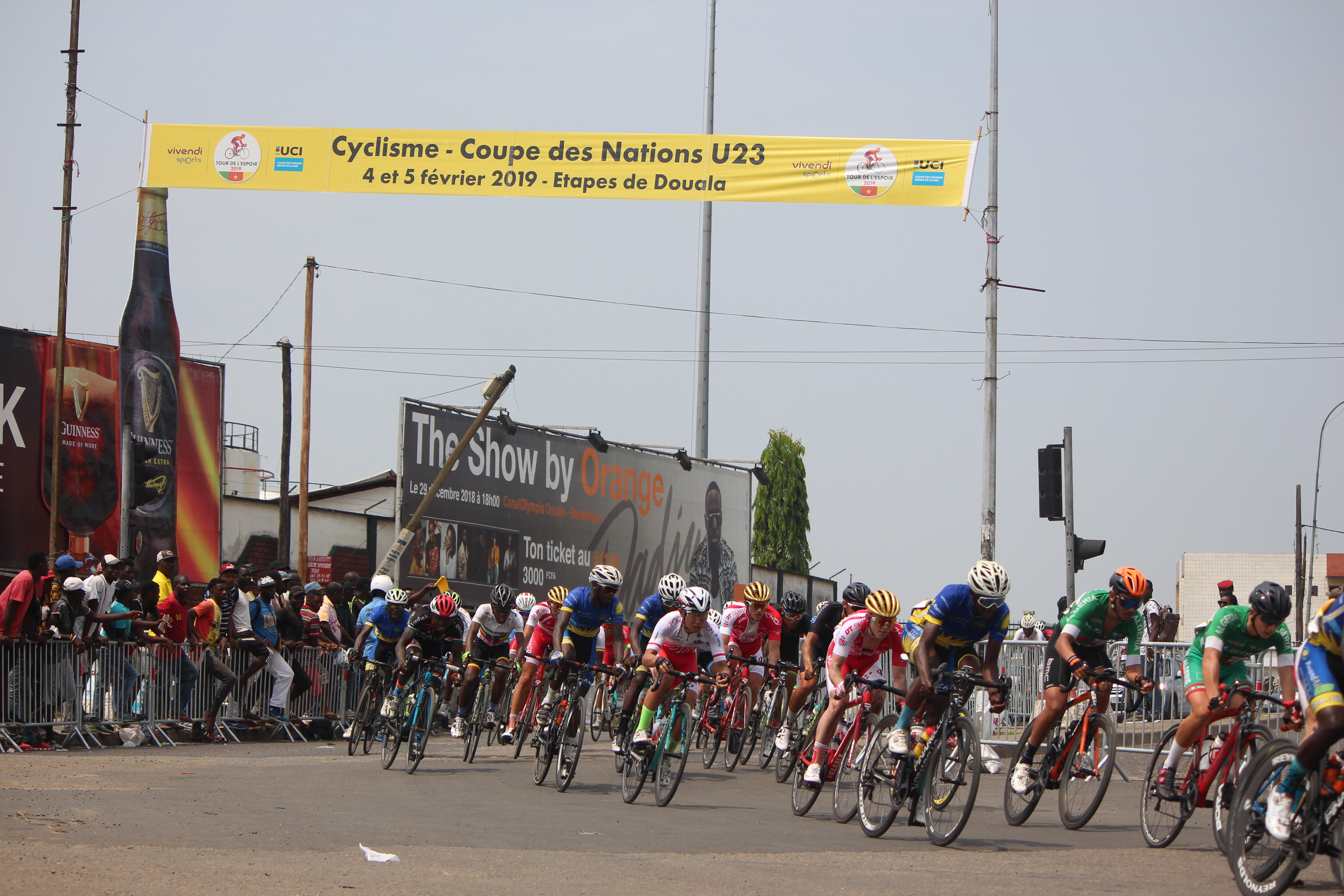

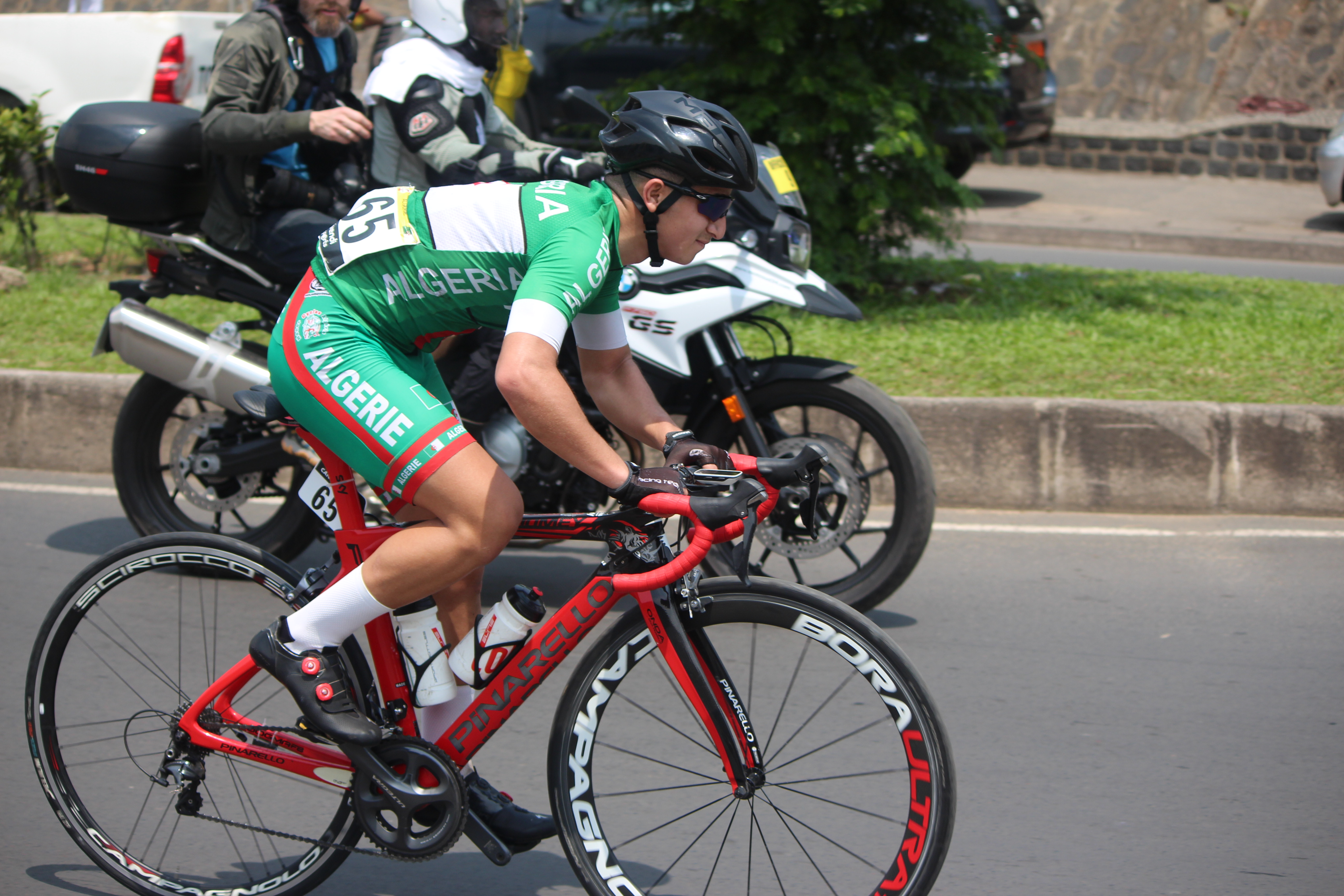

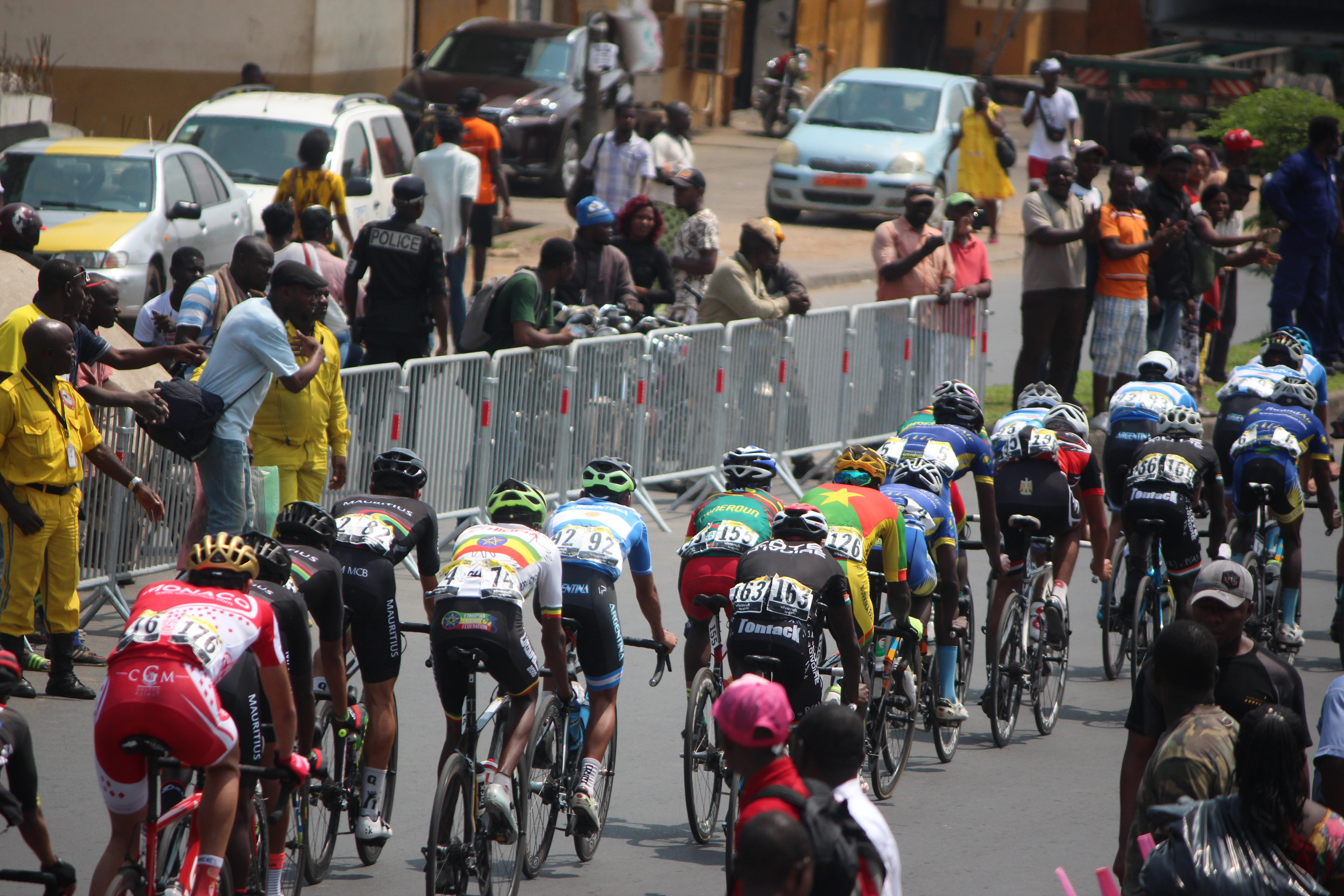

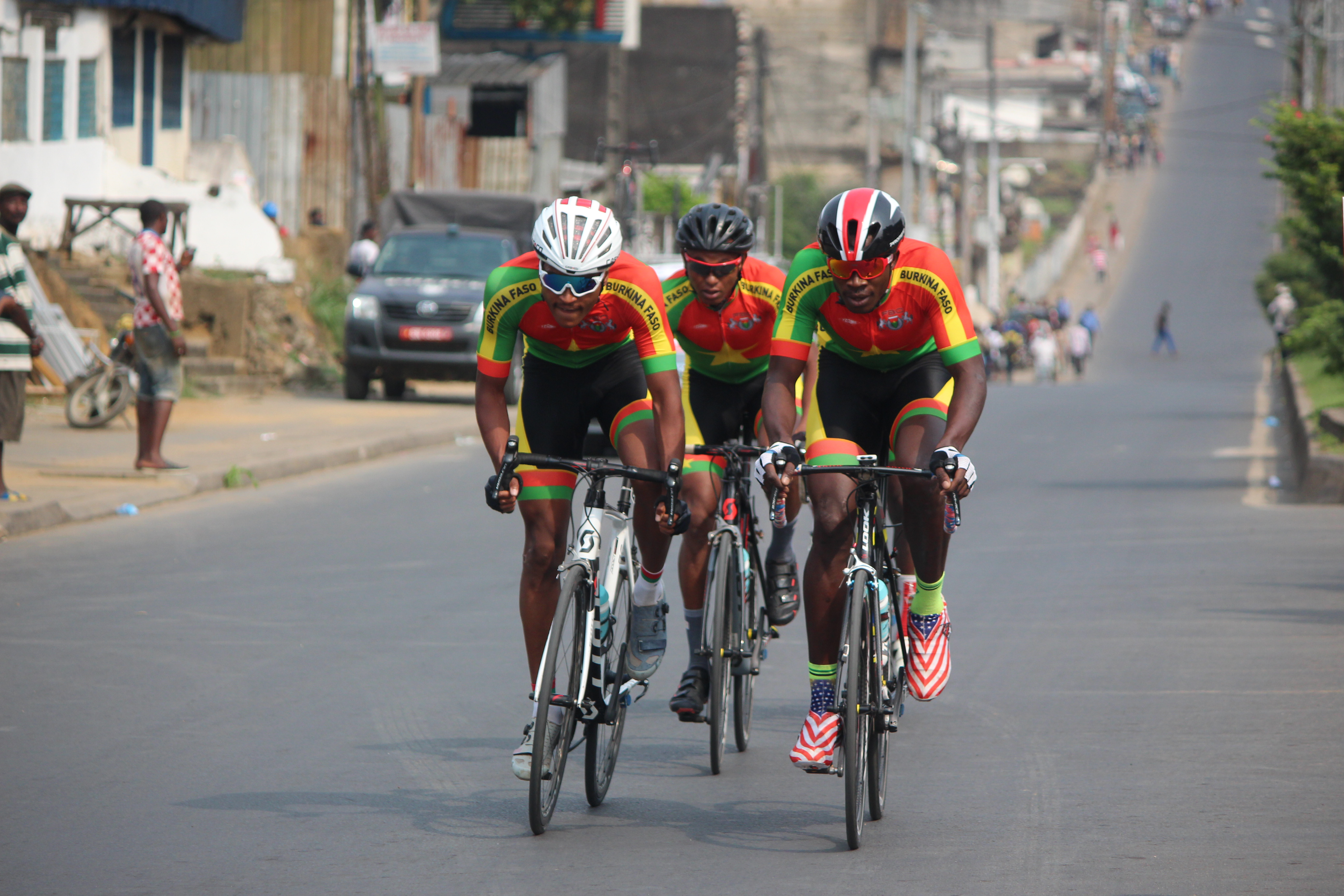

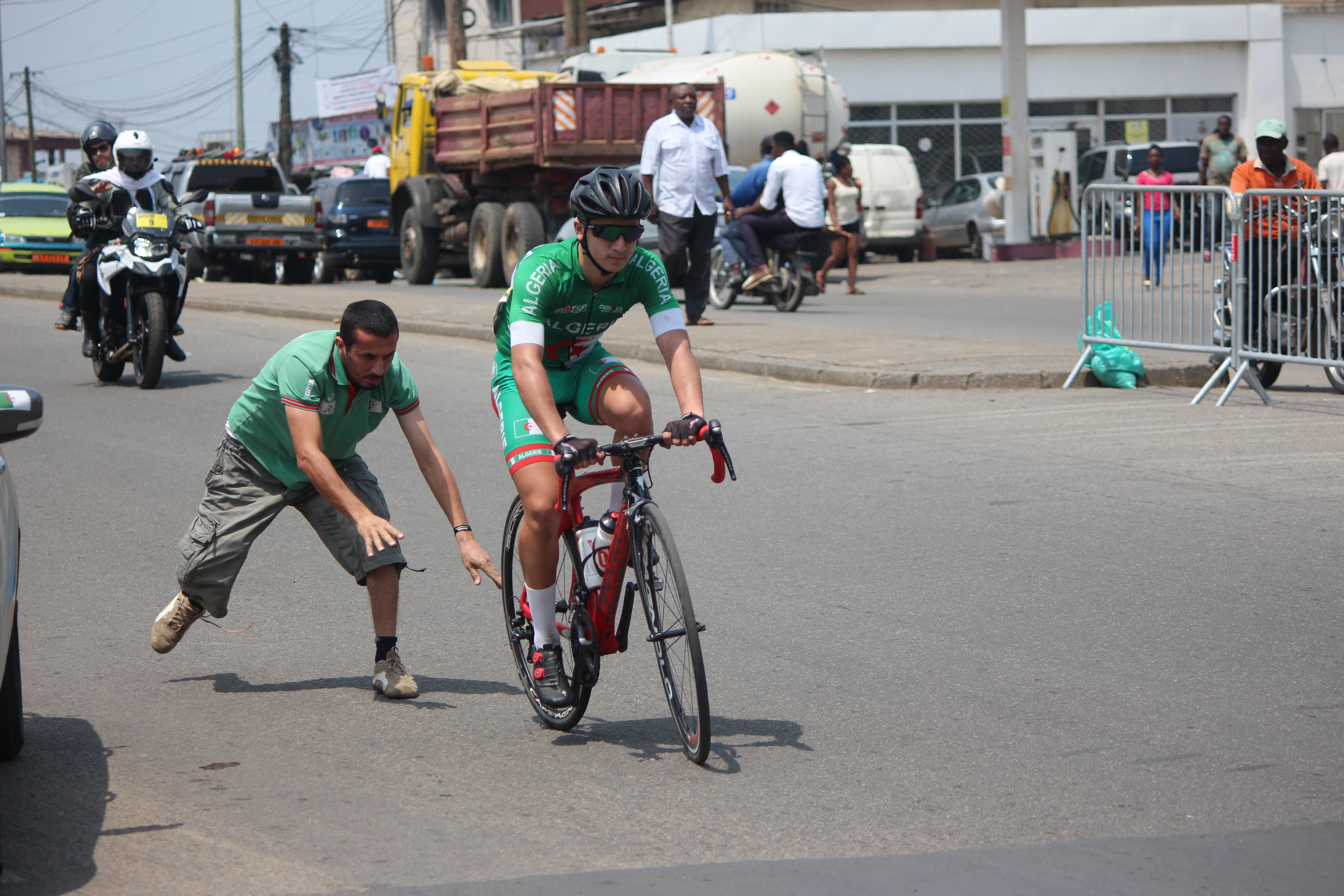

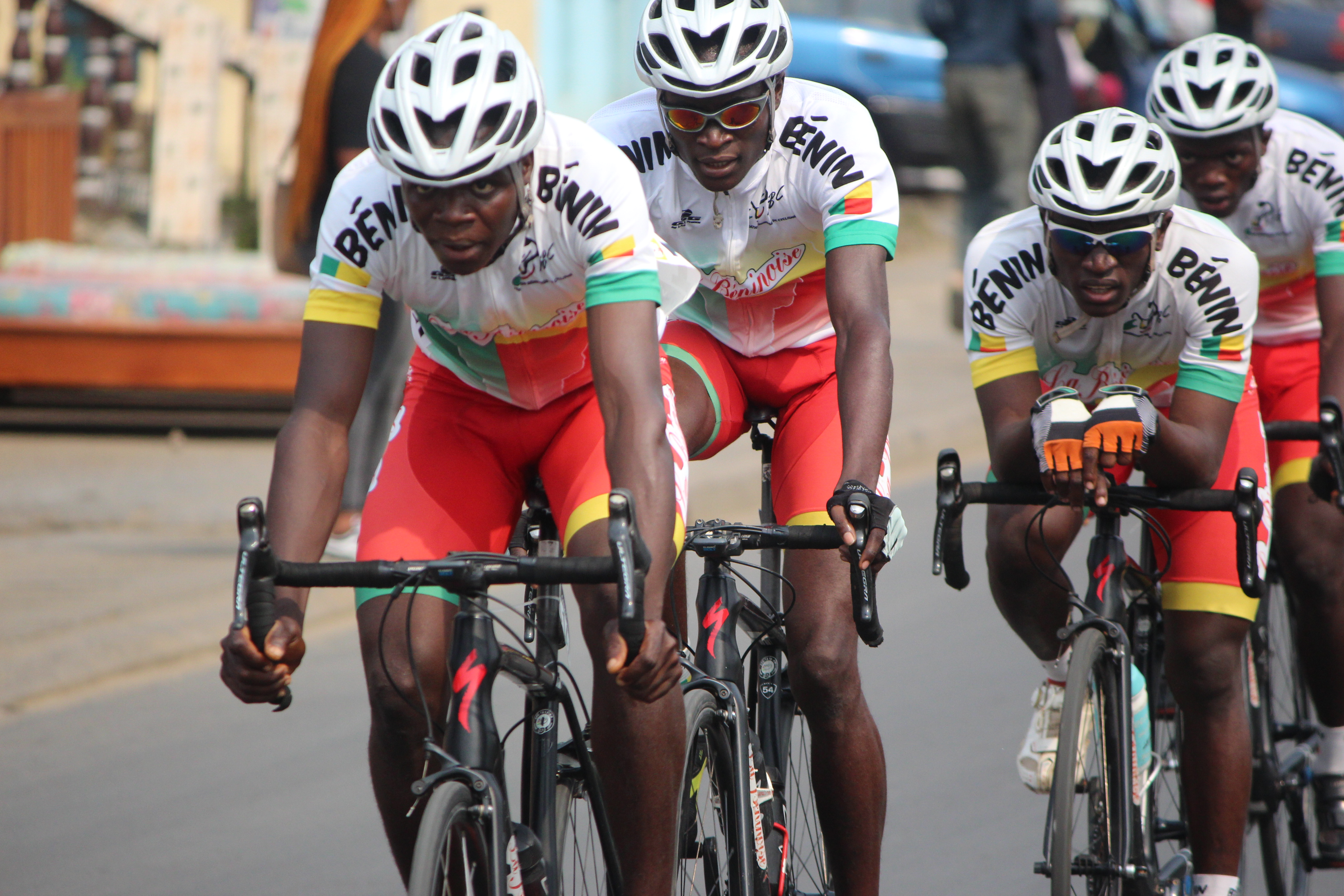

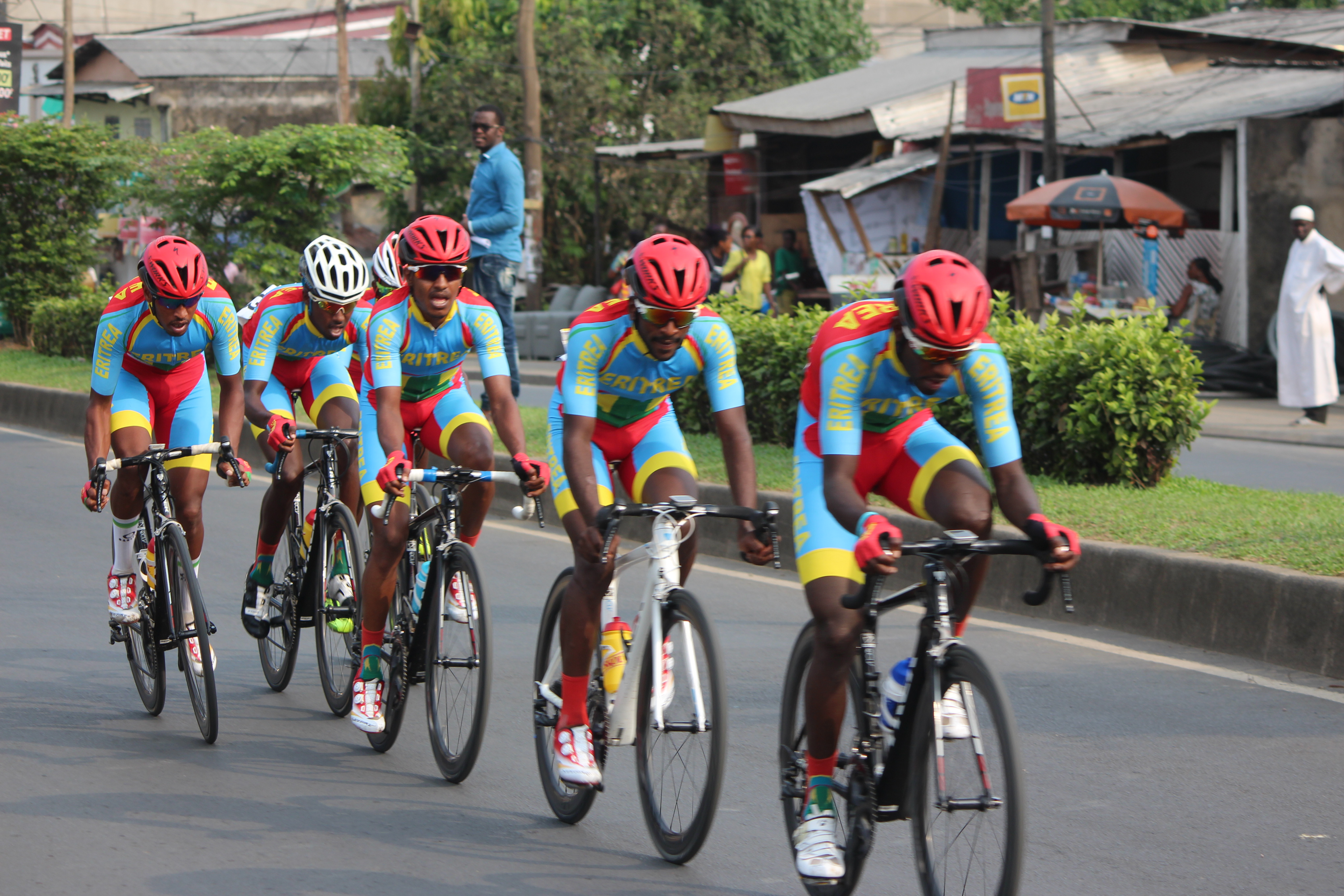

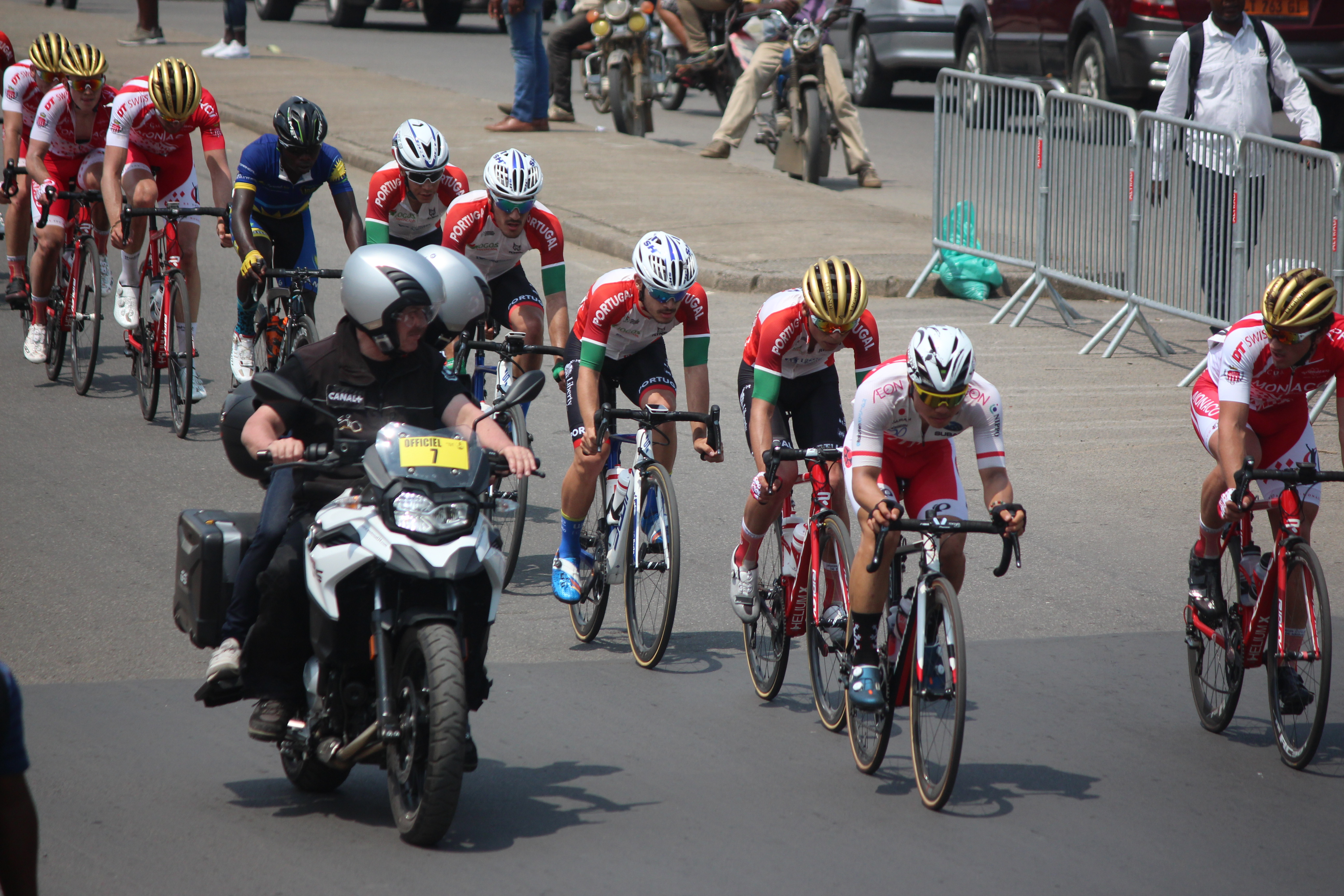

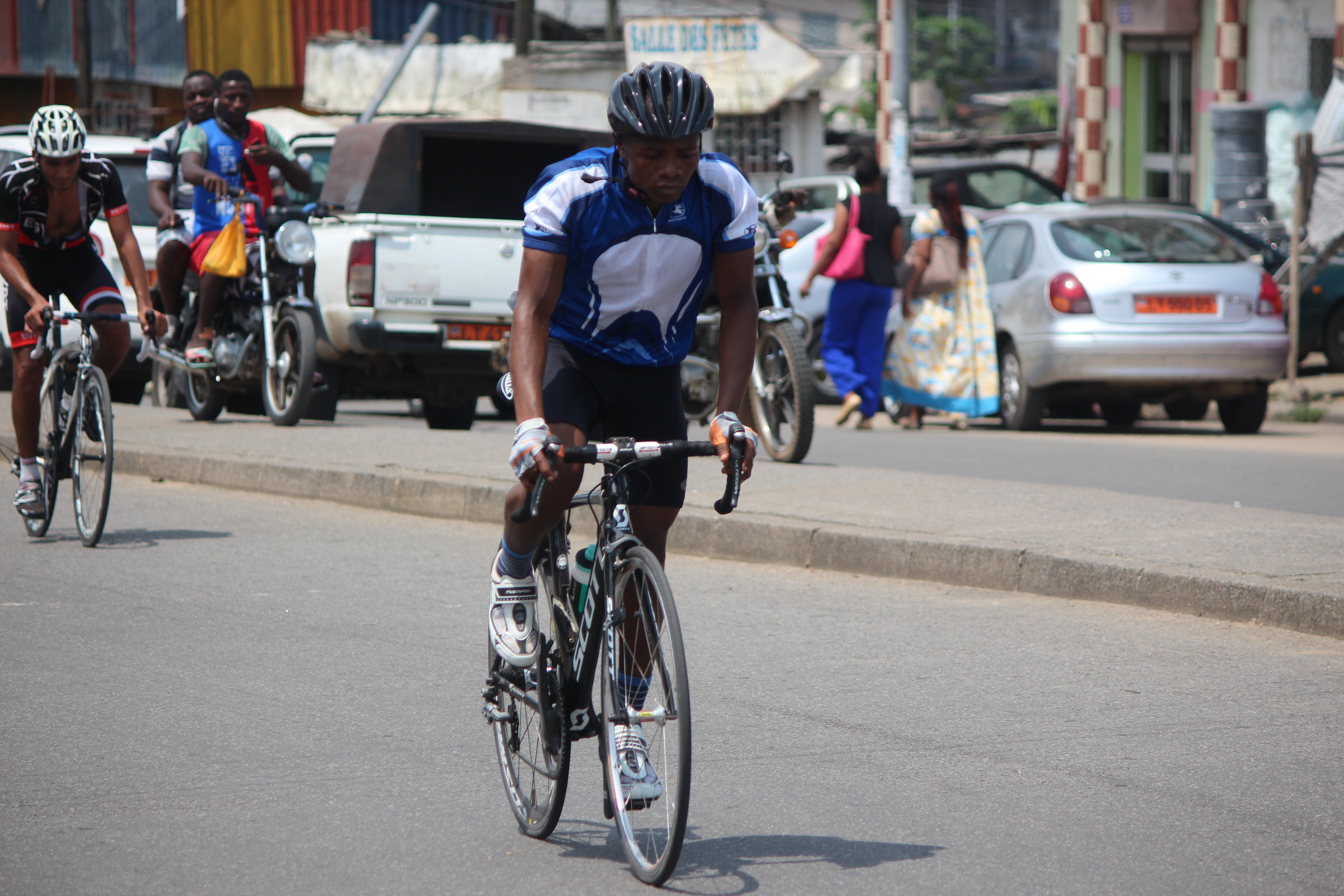
