= Grand Prix Chantal Biya =

Cameroonian multi-day road cycling race

Race details
- Date: Early October
- Region: Cameroon
- English name: GP Chantal Biya
- Discipline: Road race
- Competition: UCI Africa Tour
- Type: Stage race

History
- First edition: 2001
- Editions: 26 (as of 2026)
- Most wins: Peter van Agtmaal (NED); Yves Ngué Ngock (CMR) (2 wins)
- Most recent: Hamza Amari (ALG)

Grand Prix Chantal Biya is a professional road bicycle racing stage race held in Cameroon and sponsored by the Fédération Camerounaise de Cyclisme/Ateba Koungou. The race is named in honor of Chantal Biya, the First Lady of Cameroon as wife of President Paul Biya.

== Winners ==
Year	Country	Rider	Team
2003	China	Jianshi Luo	
2006	Cameroon	Flaubert Douanla	SNH Vélo Club
2007	Netherlands	Peter van Agtmaal	CCN Sportwear
2008	France	Thomas Rostollan	Team Allier
2009	Netherlands	Peter van Agtmaal	Global Cycling
2010	Cameroon	Martinien Tega	SNH Vélo Club
2011	Cameroon	Yves Ngue Ngock	SNH Vélo Club
2012	Switzerland	Alexandre Mercier	Team Jura Suisse
2013	Cameroon	Yves Ngue Ngock	SNH Vélo Club
2014	Eritrea	Mekseb Debesay	Bike Aid–Ride for Help
2015	Morocco	Mouhssine Lahsaini	Morocco
2016	France	Martial Roman	Sélection Auvergne-Rhône-Alpes
2017	Cameroon	Clovis Kamzong	SNH Vélo Club
2018	Slovakia	Juraj Bellan	Dukla Banská Bystrica
2019	Algeria	Azzedine Lagab	VIB Sports
2020	Rwanda	Moise Mugisha	Rwanda
2021	Slovakia	Lukáš Kubiš	Slovakia
2022	France	Axel Taillandier	Team France Défense
2023	Algeria	Yacine Hamza	Dubai Police Cycling Team
2024	Belgium	Wesley Van Dyck	Shifting Gears Strategica
2025	Mauritius	Alexandre Mayer	Mauritius (national team)
2026	Algeria	Hamza Amari	Algeria (national team)
