= Tour du Faso =

Race details
- Date: Late October
- Region: Burkina Faso
- Discipline: Road
- Competition: UCI Africa Tour
- Type: Stage race
- Organiser: Amaury Sport Organisation
- Web site: www.tourdufaso.bf

History
- First edition: 1987
- Editions: 34 (as of 2023)
- First winner: Igor Lyushenko (URS)
- Most wins: Ernest Zongo (BUR); Paul Daumont (BUR) (both 2 wins)
- Most recent: Paul Daumont (BUR)

The Tour du Faso is a 10-day road bicycle racing stage race held in Burkina Faso in the late fall. The race is organised by the Amaury Sport Organisation, which also organises the Tour de France, and since 2005, the race has been part of the UCI Africa Tour.

The race was first held in 1987 and until 1998 was reserved for amateurs. Since 2005, it is organised as a 2.2 event on the UCI Africa Tour. The race covered 1,306 kilometres (812 mi) in 2006 and is televised on the Versus cable channel. In 2014, the Tour was cancelled because of the Ebola outbreak. It was cancelled again in 2020 due to the COVID-19 pandemic and in 2022 due to security issues.

== Winners ==
Year	Country	Rider	Team
1987	Soviet Union	Igor Lyushenko	
1988	Burkina Faso	Mady Kadore	
1989	Burkina Faso	Maxime Ouédraogo	
1990	Burkina Faso	Aimé Zongo	
1991	Burkina Faso	Saidou Rouamba	
1992	France	Philippe Lepeurien	
1993	Burkina Faso	Maurice Sawadogo	
1994	Burkina Faso	Karim Yameogo	
1995	Burkina Faso	Ernest Zongo	
1996	Germany	Guido Fulst	
1997	Burkina Faso	Ernest Zongo	
1998	France	Jacques Castan	
1999	Egypt	Saïd Nasry	
2000	Ukraine	Mikhaylo Khalilov	Aguardiente Néctar–Selle Italia
2001	Netherlands	Joost Legtenberg	AXA–VvZ Professional Cycling Team
2002	Morocco	Abdelatif Saadoune	Morocco (national team)
2003	Netherlands	Maarten Tjallingii	Marco Polo Cycling Team
2004	Burkina Faso	Abdul Wahab Sawadogo	Sifa–Peugeot
2005	Burkina Faso	Rabaki Jérémie Ouédraogo	Cafe Samba
2006	Belgium	David Verdonck	Bio Avia Mode Markets
2007	Morocco	Adil Jelloul	Morocco (national team)
2008	Belgium	Guy Smet	Belgium (national team)
2009	Morocco	Abdelatif Saadoune	Morocco (national team)
2010	France	Julien Schick	Team Reine Blanche
2011	Burkina Faso	Hamidou Zidweiba	Burkina Faso (national team)
2012	Burkina Faso	Rasmané Ouédraogo	Burkina Faso (national team)
2013	Burkina Faso	Abdoul-Aziz Nikiema	Burkina Faso (national team)
2014	No race		
2015	Morocco	Mouhssine Lahsaini	Morocco (national team)
2016	Burkina Faso	Harouna Ilboudo	Burkina Faso (national team)
2017	Morocco	Salah Eddine Mraouni	Morocco (national team)
2018	Burkina Faso	Wendkouni Songho	Burkina Faso (national team)
2019	Angola	Dario Marcelino	BAI–Sicasal–Petro de Luanda
2020	No race		
2021	Germany	Daniel Bichlmann	Maloja Pushbikers
2022	No race		
2023	Burkina Faso	Paul Daumont	Burkina Faso (national team)
2024	Morocco	Mohcine El Kouraji	Morocco (national team)
2025	Burkina Faso	Paul Daumont	Burkina Faso (national team)
