= 2012 Team Sky season =

Team Sky
- 2012 season
- UCI code: SKY
- Status: UCI ProTeam
- World Ranking: 1st (1767 points)
- Manager: Dave Brailsford
- Main sponsor(s): BSkyB
- Based: United Kingdom
- Bicycles: Pinarello
- Groupset: Shimano

Season victories
- One-day races: 5
- Stage race overall: 8
- Stage race stages: 34
- Most wins: Mark Cavendish (14 wins)
- Best ranked rider: Bradley Wiggins (2nd)

The 2012 season for Team Sky began in January at the Tour Down Under and ended in October at the Tour of Beijing. As a UCI ProTeam, they were automatically invited and obliged to send a squad to every event in the UCI World Tour. The team took a total of 47 victories in the season with the most notable being Bradley Wiggins' overall victory in the Tour de France. Wiggins (2), Mark Cavendish (3), and Chris Froome also took stage victories in the event, with Froome finishing second to Wiggins in the overall standings.

== 2012 roster ==
At the end of the 2011 season, Kurt Asle Arvesen, Kjell Carlström, and Dario Cioni retired. Following the disbanding of the cycling team HTC–Highroad, Sky signed four riders from the team including World Road Race Champion Mark Cavendish, Danny Pate, Kanstantsin Sivtsov, and Bernhard Eisel.

Ages as of 1 January 2012.

Rider	Date of birth
Davide Appollonio (ITA)	2 June 1989 (aged 22)
Michael Barry (CAN)	18 December 1975 (aged 36)
Edvald Boasson Hagen (NOR)	17 May 1987 (aged 24)
Mark Cavendish (GBR)	21 May 1985 (aged 26)
Alex Dowsett (GBR)	3 October 1988 (aged 23)
Bernhard Eisel (AUT)	17 February 1981 (aged 30)
Juan Antonio Flecha (ESP)	17 September 1977 (aged 34)
Chris Froome (GBR)	20 May 1985 (aged 26)
Mathew Hayman (AUS)	20 April 1978 (aged 33)
Sergio Henao (COL)	10 December 1987 (aged 24)
Jeremy Hunt (GBR)	12 March 1974 (aged 37)
Peter Kennaugh (GBR)	15 June 1989 (aged 22)
Christian Knees (GER)	5 March 1981 (aged 30)
Thomas Lövkvist (SWE)	4 April 1984 (aged 27)
Davide Martinelli (Note: Martinelli joined the team on 1 August, as a stagiaire, from Team Hopplà Wega Truck Italia Valdarno.) (ITA)	31 May 1993 (aged 18)

Rider	Date of birth
Lars Petter Nordhaug (NOR)	14 May 1984 (aged 27)
Danny Pate (USA)	23 March 1979 (aged 32)
Richie Porte (AUS)	30 January 1985 (aged 26)
Salvatore Puccio (ITA)	31 August 1989 (aged 22)
Michael Rogers (AUS)	20 December 1979 (aged 32)
Luke Rowe (GBR)	10 March 1990 (aged 21)
Kanstantsin Siutsou (BLR)	9 August 1982 (aged 29)
Ian Stannard (GBR)	25 May 1987 (aged 24)
Chris Sutton (AUS)	10 September 1984 (aged 27)
Ben Swift (GBR)	5 November 1987 (aged 24)
Geraint Thomas (GBR)	25 May 1986 (aged 25)
Rigoberto Urán (COL)	26 January 1987 (aged 24)
Bradley Wiggins (GBR)	28 April 1980 (aged 31)
Xabier Zandio (ESP)	17 March 1977 (aged 34)

Riders who joined the team for the 2012 season

Rider	2011 team
Salvatore Puccio	neo-pro (Hoppla Truck IT)
Sergio Henao	Gobernación de Antioquia–Indeportes Antioquia
Luke Rowe	neo-pro (Rapha Condor–Sharp)
Richie Porte	Saxo Bank–SunGard
Danny Pate	HTC–Highroad
Kanstantsin Sivtsov	HTC–Highroad
Mark Cavendish	HTC–Highroad
Bernhard Eisel	HTC–Highroad

Riders who left the team during or after the 2011 season

Rider	2012 team
Kurt Asle Arvesen	Retired to become a team coach
Simon Gerrans	GreenEDGE
Greg Henderson	Lotto–Belisol
Steve Cummings	BMC Racing Team
Russell Downing	Endura Racing
Morris Possoni	Lampre–ISD
Serge Pauwels	Omega Pharma–Quick-Step
John-Lee Augustyn	Utensilnord–Named
Dario Cioni	Retired
Kjell Carlström	Retired

== One-day races ==
=== Spring classics ===
Despite being sick en route during the Kuurne–Brussels–Kuurne, Mark Cavendish won his first race for Sky.

== Stage races ==
Mark Cavendish made his debut for the team at the Tour of Qatar; during the race he won his first stages for Sky as he took the third and fifth stage. Cavendish won a stage in the Tirreno–Adriatico. Cavendish won the overall title at the Ster ZLM Toer, his first general classification win. At the Tour of Britain, Cavendish won stages three, four, and eight and held the lead of the race. Luke Rowe additionally won the first stage for the team as Cavendish crashed.

== Grand Tours ==
=== Giro d'Italia ===
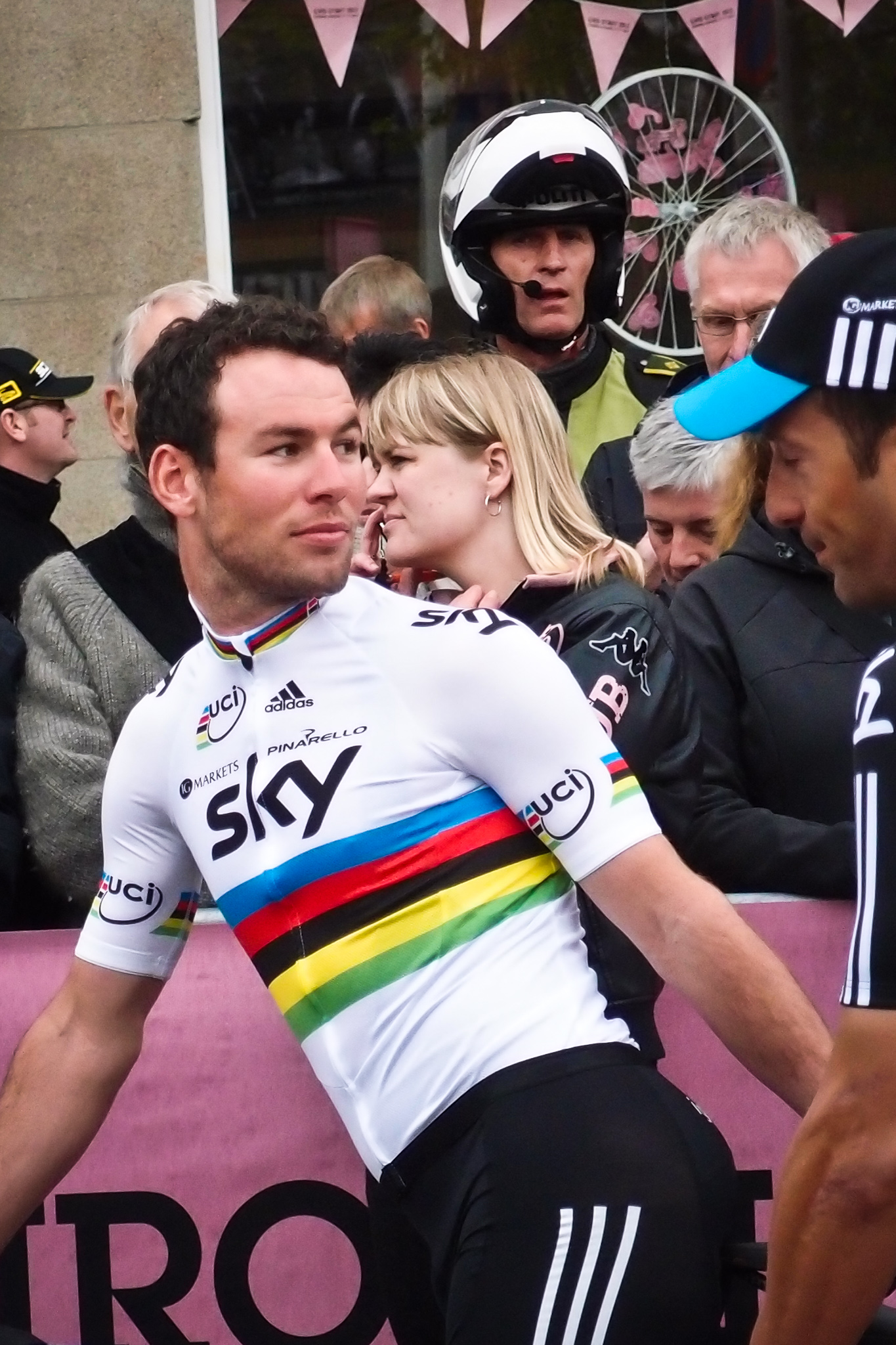
Mark Cavendish at the Giro d'Italia, where he took three stage victories

Mark Cavendish and Rigoberto Urán were seen as Sky's sprint and GC leaders at the Giro. They were joined by Uran's fellow Colombian Sergio Henao, who made his Grand Tour debut in the event, Bernhard Eisel, Juan Antonio Flecha, Ian Stannard, Jeremy Hunt, Geraint Thomas, and Peter Kennaugh, the latter two using the event as preparation for the Olympic Team Pursuit. The race began in Herning, Denmark with an 8.7 km individual time trial, in which Thomas finished second behind Taylor Phinney. The following stage saw a sprint finish in the same city, with Cavendish taking has first grand tour stage victory for Sky, and his 8th in the Giro. Cavendish was in contention for victory on the following stage but in the sprint Roberto Ferrari aggressively switched lanes, clipping Cavendish and sending him to the ground and causing the whole field to stack up behind. Among other riders to fall was overall leader Phinney. Cavendish later tweeted that Ferrari should be "ashamed to take out Pink, Red, & World Champ jerseys". Cavendish was lucky to suffer only minor injuries, and recovered sufficiently on the following rest day to start Stage 4, a team time trial, where Sky recorded the ninth fastest time, 30 seconds down on the winners, Garmin. Despite his injuries, Cavendish took his second victory on Stage 5. The next stages were more hilly, and Uran rose to tenth place overall on Stage 10. Cavendish took his third stage win of the event on Stage 13 to extend his lead in the Points Classification. Stage 14 was the first categorised mountain stage of the race, and Uran took sixth place to rise to seventh place on the GC, and take the lead in the Young Rider's Classification. On the following stage however, Henao proved the stronger of the two Colombians, finishing fourth and taking the White Jersey from his teammate. On Stage 17, Uran finished fourth with the same time as winner Joaquim Rodríguez, and rose to fifth overall, re-claiming the white jersey from Henao, who now sat in 10th overall. Cavendish was beaten by Andrea Guardini in the sprint finish on Stage 18, but extended his Points Classification lead over Rodriguez to 29 points. On Stage 20, the queen stage of the race, finishing on the Stelvio Pass, Uran struggled on the final climb and was paced by Henao, with the pair dropping over a minute to Rodriguez and Ryder Hesjedal. The final Stage was a 28.2 km individual time trial in Milan. Geraint Thomas took second place behind Marco Pinotti on the stage, with Uran and Henao finishing seventh and ninth overall, 5 minutes 57 seconds and 7 minutes 50 seconds behind the winner, Ryder Hesjedal, respectively. Uran won the White Jersey, the first victory for Sky in a Grand Tour classification. Meanwhile, Rodriguez edged out Cavendish to win the Points Classification by a single point.

=== Tour de France ===
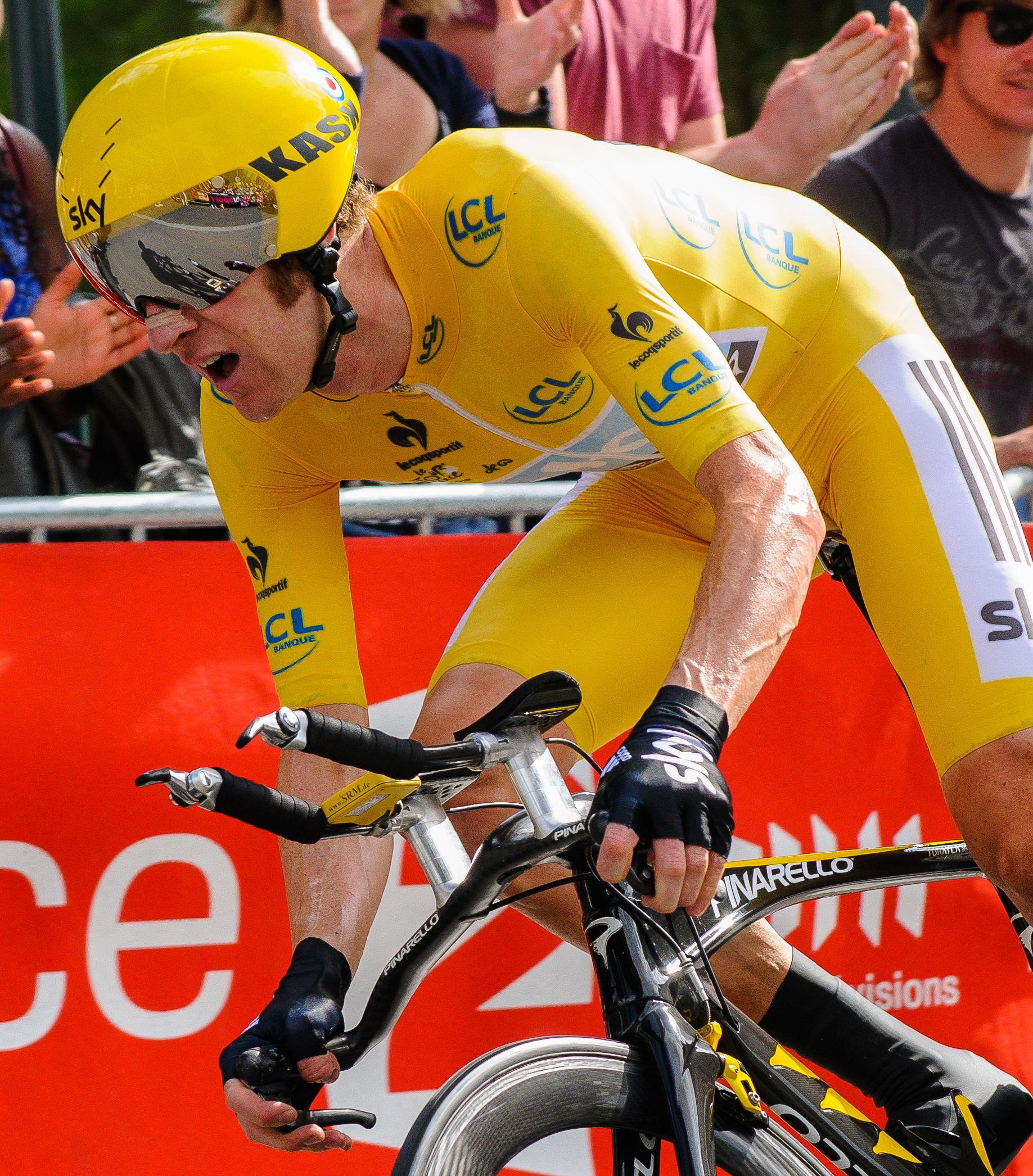
Bradley Wiggins on his way to victory on Stage 19 of the Tour de France

Bradley Wiggins led Sky at the Tour de France, and was considered the favourite for overall by victory by many, following his victories in Paris–Nice, the Tour de Romandie and the Critérium du Dauphiné. He would be supported in the mountains by Chris Froome, Michael Rogers, Richie Porte, Konstantin Sivtsov, Christian Knees and Edvald Boasson Hagen, whilst World Champion Mark Cavendish and Bernhard Eisel were also selected to challenge in the sprints. The race got off to an ideal start for Sky and Wiggins, as he finished second to Fabian Cancellara in the Prologue, meaning he took time out of all his GC rivals, without the team having to defend the Yellow Jersey from the start. Boasson Hagen also placed fifth in the Prologue. On Stage 1, Boasson Hagen finished third after bridging across to a late attack by Cancellara and Peter Sagan, only for Sagan to outsprint the pair. Chris Froome meanwhile suffered a flat tyre in the closing stages and lost over a minute to Sagan. Stage 2 saw the first bunch sprint of the race, and Cavendish took a thrilling victory, edging out André Greipel, despite the lack of a lead out train. Stage 3 saw a hill top finish in Boulogne-sur-Mer, and Boasson Hagen finished second to Sagan. The team lost Sivtsov on the stage however, as he crashed out with a broken leg. Cavendish looked to be in contention for another sprint victory on Stage 4, but he and Eisel were taken out in a crash inside the last 3 km. The pair were lucky to sustain only minor injuries, and started the following Stage, where Cavendish placed fifth. Sky were avoided disaster on Stage 6, with most of the team not being caught up in a crash which delayed most of the field, although Cavendish and Boasson Hagen lost time. The crash effectively removed Fränk Schleck, Alejandro Valverde, Pierre Rolland, and the entire Rabobank and Garmin teams from contention for overall victory.

Stage 7 saw the first summit finish of the Tour, on La Planche des Belles Filles. After Boasson Hagen, Rogers and Porte successively drove a hard tempo on the climb, only Cadel Evans, Vincenzo Nibali and Rein Taaramäe remained with Wiggins and Froome on the climb. Froome outsprinted Evans to take victory on the Stage, whilst Wiggins came in third to take the race lead. Stage 9 was a 41.5 km individual time trial, which Wiggins won by 35 seconds over Froome, who came second. Wiggins now led the race by 1 minute, 53 seconds over Evans, with Froome now sitting third overall a further 14 seconds back, ahead of Nibali in fourth. On Stage 10, Nibali attacked on a descent with help from teammate Sagan, but was brought back by the efforts of Sky, and in particular Porte.

The second summit finish of the race came on Stage 11, to La Toussuire. On the stage, Evans and teammate Tejay van Garderen attempted a long range attack on the Col de la Croix de Fer, but could not gain a lead of more than 30 seconds over the Sky led peloton, before being brought back by Rogers. As the peloton reached the final climb, Nibali and Jurgen Van Den Broeck launched several attacks, the second of which Froome was forced to work hard to bring back, and appeared to be in difficulty at one stage, leaving Wiggins to set the pace, although Froome recovered. The pair rejoined Nibali and Jurgen Van Den Broeck, only for Froome to immediately attack, putting Wiggins in difficulty. He subsequently received the order from his team manager to hold back and wait for yellow jersey Wiggins, and the group remained together for the rest of the climb, with the exception of Evans who cracked and lost time, meaning Froome moved up to second overall, two minutes and five seconds behind Wiggins.

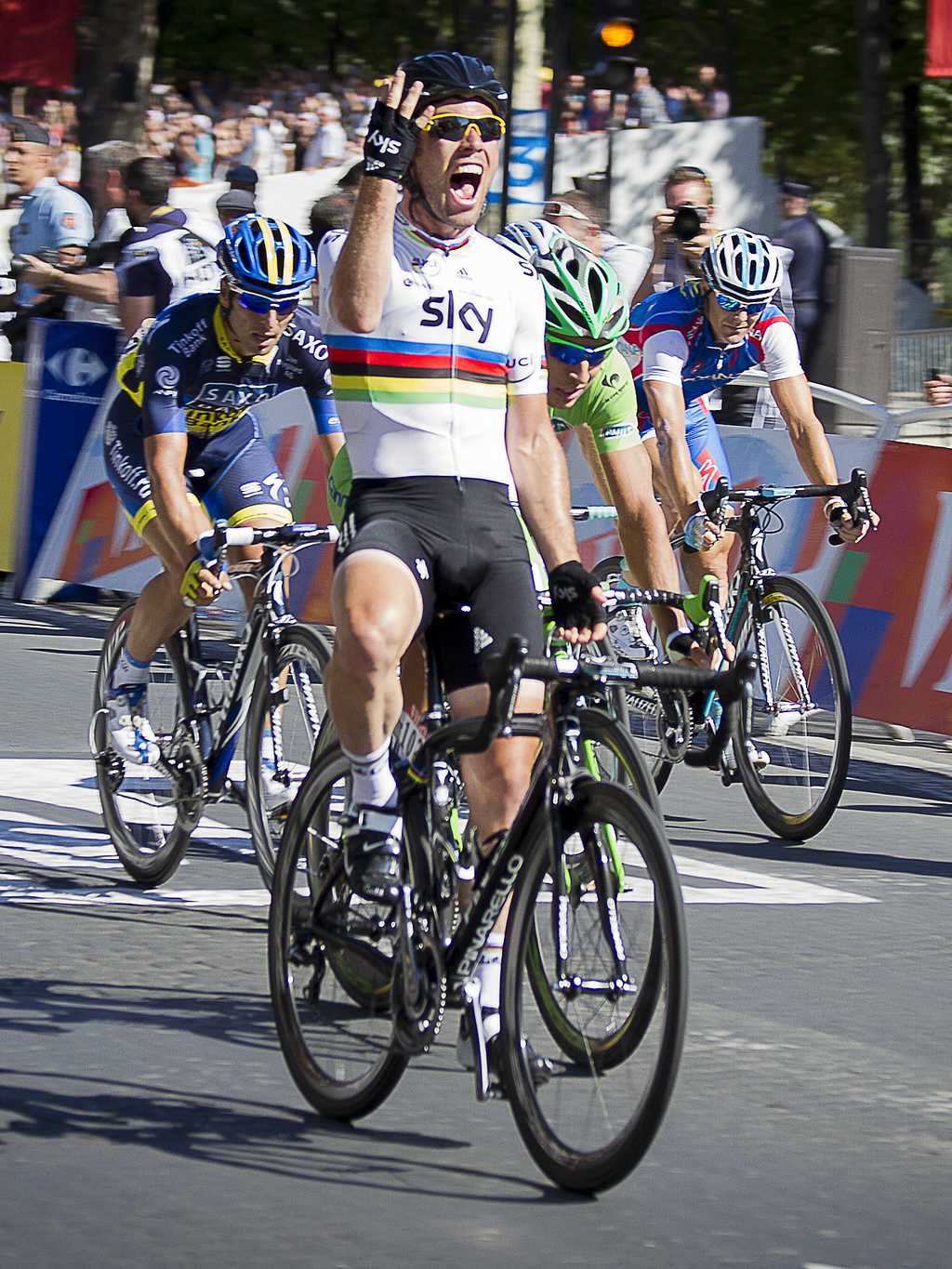
Mark Cavendish winning the final stage on the Champs-Élysées

Boasson Hagen took third on Stage 13 after a surprising lead out by Wiggins. During stage 14, a mountain stage, a spectator threw carpet tacks onto the narrow road at the top of the Mur de Péguère climb.[156] Several riders suffered punctures, including Evans, who lost approximately two minutes while his team repaired his bicycle. Wiggins and his fellow members of Team Sky emerged without a puncture. Believing that a puncture resulting from an unfortunate incident should not determine the fate of a competitor, Wiggins then had his teammates and the rest of the peloton slow down to allow Evans and other affected cyclists to catch up. Once they had done so, the peloton remained together for the rest of the race, resulting in little change to the general classification. It was perceived as a generous act of sportsmanship and Wiggins was called "Le Gentleman" as a result. On Stage 16, Wiggins and Froome were the only riders able to respond to an attack by Nibali on the final climb, and the three stayed together on the descent to finish with the same time. On the final summit finish on Stage 19, Wiggins and Froome dropped all of their rivals and attempted to catch Valverde, who was out in front. Ultimately, they came up short due to Froome having to wait three times for Wiggins as the race leader was several metres behind his domestique on certain parts of the climb, although they took second and third to extend their advantage over Nibali. Sky made a late call to chase down the day's breakaway on Stage 18, in the hope of giving Cavendish a stage victory to repay his work as a domestique. However, a late attack by Luis León Sánchez and Nicolas Roche looked set to be the winning move, only for Cavendish to sprint past the pair in the final 200 metres to take his second stage win of the race.

The penultimate stage of the Tour was the final individual time trial into city of Chartres. Wiggins and Froome repeated the 1-2 of the Stage 9 time trial, all but sealing their 1st and 2nd places overall. The Tour concluded with the now-customary stage finish on the Champs-Élysées in Paris, where Sky chased down a late breakaway before Wiggins and Boasson Hagen led out Cavendish, winning the final stage for the fourth successive year, becoming the first incumbent world champion to win on the Champs-Élysées. His 23rd stage victory[109] allowed him to move into fourth place on the all-time Tour stage wins list. Wiggins finished safely alongside Rogers to secure his overall victory, becoming the first British rider to win the event, and the first person in history to win the Paris–Nice, the Tour de Romandie, the Critérium du Dauphiné and the Tour de France in a single season. He was joined on the podium by Froome, who finished second overall, and Nibali in third.

=== Vuelta a España ===
Juan Antonio Flecha, Chris Froome, Sergio Henao, Danny Pate, Richie Porte, Ian Stannard, Ben Swift, Rigoberto Urán and Xabier Zandio lined up to start the Vuelta a España. Froome was designated the team leader, while Swift was the squads sprinter. Sky finished fifth in the time trial on the first stage. Ben Swift finished in second place on stage 18 and third on the second stage. Chris Froome finished second on stage six. Richie Porte finished second on stage 20.

== Season victories ==
Date	Race	Competition	Rider	Country	Location
22 January	Tour Down Under, Sprints classification	UCI World Tour	Edvald Boasson Hagen (NOR)	Australia	
7 February	Tour of Qatar, Stage 3	UCI Asia Tour	Mark Cavendish (GBR)	Qatar	Al-Gharafa Stadium
7 February	Trofeo Deià	UCI Europe Tour	Lars Petter Nordhaug (NOR)	Spain	Deià
9 February	Tour of Qatar, Stage 5	UCI Asia Tour	Mark Cavendish (GBR)	Qatar	Al Khor
16 February	Volta ao Algarve, Stage 2	UCI Europe Tour	Edvald Boasson Hagen (NOR)	Portugal	Lagoa
17 February	Volta ao Algarve, Stage 3	UCI Europe Tour	Richie Porte (AUS)	Portugal	Alto do Malhão
19 February	Volta ao Algarve, Stage 5	UCI Europe Tour	Bradley Wiggins (GBR)	Portugal	Portimão
19 February	Volta ao Algarve, Overall	UCI Europe Tour	Richie Porte (AUS)	Portugal	
19 February	Volta ao Algarve, Points classification	UCI Europe Tour	Edvald Boasson Hagen (NOR)	Portugal	
19 February	Volta ao Algarve, Teams classification	UCI Europe Tour	(Note: The riders on the squad were Chris Froome, Richie Porte, Edvald Boasson Hagen, Thomas Lövkvist, Lars Petter Nordhaug, Xabier Zandio, Kanstantsin Sivtsov and Bradley Wiggins)	Portugal	
26 February	Kuurne–Brussels–Kuurne	UCI Europe Tour	Mark Cavendish (GBR)	Belgium	Kuurne
8 March	Tirreno–Adriatico, Stage 2	UCI World Tour	Mark Cavendish (GBR)	Italy	Indicatore
9 March	Tirreno–Adriatico, Stage 3	UCI World Tour	Edvald Boasson Hagen (NOR)	Italy	Terni
11 March	Paris–Nice, Stage 8	UCI World Tour	Bradley Wiggins (GBR)	France	Col d'Èze
11 March	Paris–Nice, Overall	UCI World Tour	Bradley Wiggins (GBR)	France	
11 March	Paris–Nice, Points classification	UCI World Tour	Bradley Wiggins (GBR)	France	
22 March	Volta a Catalunya, Stage 4	UCI World Tour	Rigoberto Urán (COL)	Spain	Ascó
25 March	Critérium International, Teams classification	UCI Europe Tour	(Note: The riders on the squad were Lars Petter Nordhaug, Chris Froome, Thomas Lövkvist, Salvatore Puccio, Michael Rogers and Luke Rowe)	France	
24 April	Tour de Romandie, Prologue	UCI World Tour	Geraint Thomas (GBR)	Switzerland	Lausanne
25 April	Tour de Romandie, Stage 1	UCI World Tour	Bradley Wiggins (GBR)	Switzerland	La Chaux-de-Fonds
29 April	Tour de Romandie, Stage 5	UCI World Tour	Bradley Wiggins (GBR)	Switzerland	Crans-Montana
29 April	Tour de Romandie, Overall	UCI World Tour	Bradley Wiggins (GBR)	Switzerland	
29 April	Tour de Romandie, Teams classification	UCI World Tour	(Note: The riders on the squad were Bradley Wiggins, Richie Porte, Mark Cavendish, Michael Rogers, Geraint Thomas, Chris Froome, Kanstantsin Sivtsov and Danny Pate)	Switzerland	
6 May	Giro d'Italia, Stage 2	UCI World Tour	Mark Cavendish (GBR)	Denmark	Herning
10 May	Giro d'Italia, Stage 5	UCI World Tour	Mark Cavendish (GBR)	Italy	Fano
18 May	Giro d'Italia, Stage 13	UCI World Tour	Mark Cavendish (GBR)	Italy	Cervere
19 May	Glava Tour of Norway, Stage 4	UCI Europe Tour	Edvald Boasson Hagen (NOR)	Norway	Lillehammer
20 May	Glava Tour of Norway, Overall	UCI Europe Tour	Edvald Boasson Hagen (NOR)	Norway	
20 May	Glava Tour of Norway, Points classification	UCI Europe Tour	Edvald Boasson Hagen (NOR)	Norway	
20 May	Glava Tour of Norway, Young rider classification	UCI Europe Tour	Edvald Boasson Hagen (NOR)	Norway	
20 May	Glava Tour of Norway, Teams classification	UCI Europe Tour	(Note: The riders on the squad were Edvald Boasson Hagen, Ben Swift, Lars Petter Nordhaug, Davide Appollonio, Michael Barry, Mathew Hayman, Salvatore Puccio and Luke Rowe)	Norway	
24 May	Bayern-Rundfahrt, Stage 2	UCI Europe Tour	Michael Rogers (AUS)	Germany	Kempten
26 May	Bayern-Rundfahrt, Stage 4	UCI Europe Tour	Michael Rogers (AUS)	Germany	Feuchtwangen
27 May	Bayern-Rundfahrt, Overall	UCI Europe Tour	Michael Rogers (AUS)	Germany	
27 May	Bayern-Rundfahrt, Teams classification	UCI Europe Tour	(Note: The riders on the squad were Christian Knees, Thomas Löfkvist, Danny Pate, Richie Porte, Michael Rogers, Kanstantsin Sivtsov and Xabier Zandio)	Germany	
27 May	Giro d'Italia, Young rider classification	UCI World Tour	Rigoberto Urán (COL)	Italy	
27 May	Giro d'Italia, Azzurri d'Italia classification	UCI World Tour	Mark Cavendish (GBR)	Italy	
27 May	Giro d'Italia, Combativity classification	UCI World Tour	Mark Cavendish (GBR)	Italy	
6 June	Critérium du Dauphiné, Stage 3	UCI World Tour	Edvald Boasson Hagen (NOR)	France	La Clayette
7 June	Critérium du Dauphiné, Stage 4	UCI World Tour	Bradley Wiggins (GBR)	France	Bourg-en-Bresse
10 June	Critérium du Dauphiné, Overall	UCI World Tour	Bradley Wiggins (GBR)	France	
10 June	Critérium du Dauphiné, Teams classification	UCI World Tour	(Note: The riders on the squad were Bradley Wiggins, Chris Froome, Edvald Boasson Hagen, Christian Knees, Danny Pate, Richie Porte, Michael Rogers and Kanstantsin Sivtsov)	France	
17 June	Ster ZLM Toer, Overall	UCI Europe Tour	Mark Cavendish (GBR)	Netherlands	
2 July	Tour de France, Stage 2	UCI World Tour	Mark Cavendish (GBR)	Belgium	Tournai
7 July	Tour de France, Stage 7	UCI World Tour	Chris Froome (GBR)	France	Planche des Belles Filles
9 July	Tour de France, Stage 9	UCI World Tour	Bradley Wiggins (GBR)	France	Besançon
11 July	Tour de Pologne, Stage 2	UCI World Tour	Ben Swift (GBR)	Poland	Opole
14 July	Tour de Pologne, Stage 5	UCI World Tour	Ben Swift (GBR)	Poland	Zakopane
16 July	Tour de Pologne, Points classification	UCI World Tour	Ben Swift (GBR)	Poland	
16 July	Tour de Pologne, Teams classification	UCI World Tour	(Note: The riders on the squad were Alex Dowsett, Juan Antonio Flecha, Sergio Henao, Mathew Hayman, Lars Petter Nordhaug, Ian Stannard, Ben Swift and Rigoberto Urán)	Poland	
20 July	Tour de France, Stage 18	UCI World Tour	Mark Cavendish (GBR)	France	Brive-la-Gaillarde
21 July	Tour de France, Stage 19	UCI World Tour	Bradley Wiggins (GBR)	France	Chartres
22 July	Tour de France, Stage 20	UCI World Tour	Mark Cavendish (GBR)	France	Paris
22 July	Tour de France, Overall	UCI World Tour	Bradley Wiggins (GBR)	France	
24 August	Danmark Rundt, Stage 3	UCI Europe Tour	Lars Petter Nordhaug (NOR)	Denmark	Vejle
26 August	Danmark Rundt, Stage 6	UCI Europe Tour	Mark Cavendish (GBR)	Denmark	Frederiksberg
26 August	Danmark Rundt, Teams classification	UCI Europe Tour	(Note: The riders on the squad were Mark Cavendish, Bernhard Eisel, Peter Kennaugh, Davide Martinelli, Lars Petter Nordhaug, Michael Rogers, Luke Rowe and Geraint Thomas)	Denmark	
26 August	GP Ouest-France	UCI World Tour	Edvald Boasson Hagen (NOR)	France	Plouay
9 September	Tour of Britain, Stage 1	UCI Europe Tour	Luke Rowe (GBR)	Great Britain	Royal Norfolk Showground
9 September	Grand Prix Cycliste de Montréal	UCI World Tour	Lars Petter Nordhaug (NOR)	Canada	Montreal
11 September	Tour of Britain, Stage 3	UCI Europe Tour	Mark Cavendish (GBR)	Great Britain	Dumfries
12 September	Tour of Britain, Stage 4	UCI Europe Tour	Mark Cavendish (GBR)	Great Britain	Blackpool
16 September	Tour of Britain, Stage 8	UCI Europe Tour	Mark Cavendish (GBR)	Great Britain	Guildford
27 September	Giro del Piemonte	UCI Europe Tour	Rigoberto Urán (COL)	Italy	Biella
13 October	Tour of Beijing, Points classification	UCI World Tour	Edvald Boasson Hagen (NOR)	China	
13 October	UCI World Tour, Teams classification	UCI World Tour	(Note: This award is calculated by adding the points earned by a team's top five riders in the individual standings. Those five riders were Bradley Wiggins, Chris Froome, Edvald Boasson Hagen, Rigoberto Urán, and Michael Rogers)		
