= Cycling at the 2004 Summer Olympics – Men's road time trial =

Cycling at the Olympics

Men's cycling road time trial at the Games of the XXVIII Olympiad
- Venue: Vouliagmeni Olympic Centre
- Competitors: 40
- Winning time: 57:50.58

Medalists
1st place, gold medalist(s)		Viatcheslav Ekimov	Russia
2nd place, silver medalist(s)		Bobby Julich	United States
3rd place, bronze medalist(s)		Michael Rogers	Australia

The men's time trial at the 2004 Summer Olympics (Cycling):

== Medalists ==
Of the top riders, it soon became clear that Sydney 2000 time trial gold medal winner Russian rider Viatcheslav Ekimov was setting the time to beat. The current world time trial champion, Michael Rogers from Australia, appeared to match Ekimov's times, but faded in the final kilometres. Tyler Hamilton, from the US, had problems with his radio shortly after the start, and rode the race effectively without radio communication. Hamilton finished strongly claiming the gold medal for the US, averaging 50.062 km/h to finish the 48 km course in 57:31.74. Ekimov was awarded the silver medal, with a time of 57:50.58 nearly 19 seconds behind Hamilton, with another American, Bobby Julich, in a time of 57:58.19 inching out Michael Rogers (58:01.67) for the bronze medal.

Michael Rich (58:09.46) from Germany finished 37 seconds behind Hamilton for fifth, with Kazakhstan rider Alexander Vinokourov finishing sixth. The last person to start, the 2000 Olympics road race winner and former world time trial champion Jan Ullrich from Germany, could not match the pace and ended with a time of 59:02.04 in seventh position.

On 20 May 2011, the Wall Street Journal reported that Hamilton returned his gold medal to the U.S. Anti-Doping Agency after Hamilton acknowledged to 60 Minutes that he used doping products during his career. The International Olympic Committee responded in August 2012 by stripping Hamilton of his medal.

On 5 September 2012, Random House (Bantam Books) published Hamilton's memoir The Secret Race: Inside the Hidden World of the Tour de France: Doping, Cover-ups, and Winning at All Costs, coauthored with American writer Daniel Coyle. It won the 2012 William Hill Sports Book of the Year award. In the book, he details his career and his relationship with Lance Armstrong, for whom he was a teammate and a confidant. It also details some of the doping practices he and Armstrong were using on the USP team, such as EPO injections and blood transfusions. They parted ways when Hamilton went riding for CSC. This decision was motivated by the fact that Armstrong had become cold and vindictive toward him. Hamilton then recounts the 2 years spent riding for Bjarne Riis, his sympathy for the former rider and how Riis introduced him to Eufemiano Fuentes, a Spanish doctor who would be later investigated in the Operacion Puerto doping affair. He then recounts his years on the Phonak Team when he tested positive during the Vuelta a España to an alleged homologous blood transfusion.

Despite admitting throughout the work that he very regularly used EPO, testosterone pills and patches, and autologous blood transfusions, Hamilton staunchly opposed the sanction, since he had never used the blood of another person. It was speculated that Fuentes and his assistant had mixed the blood of another rider with his. His career in shambles, he raced for lesser teams after his suspension, tested positive for DHEA (in an OTC herbal anti-depressant) and retired. He later received a call from United States federal investigator Jeff Novitzky, who wanted to talk to him. He refused and was served a subpoena, whereupon he decided to tell everything. Some former teammates of Lance Armstrong and other witnesses appeared, until the federal government dropped the charges. The USADA took over the investigation under civil law, and Armstrong was ultimately stripped of all his titles from August 1998 onward. Armstrong was also banned from bicycle racing and triathlon competition. Ekimov, who had raced for many more years than Hamilton with the infamous Lance Armstrong and Johan Bruyneel duo, was upgraded to gold.

== Results ==
Final results
Rank	Cyclist	Country	Time
1st place, gold medalist(s)	Viatcheslav Ekimov	Russia	57:50.58
2nd place, silver medalist(s)	Bobby Julich	United States	57:58.19
3rd place, bronze medalist(s)	Michael Rogers	Australia	58:01.67
4	Michael Rich	Germany	58:09.46
5	Alexander Vinokourov	Kazakhstan	58:58.14
6	Jan Ullrich	Germany	59:02.04
7	Santiago Botero	Colombia	59:04.76
8	Igor González de Galdeano	Spain	59:27.25
9	Fabian Cancellara	Switzerland	59:42.38
10	Yuriy Krivtsov	Ukraine	59:49.40
11	Christophe Moreau	France	59:50.28
12	Marc Wauters	Belgium	59:59.63
13	Michal Hrazdíra	Czech Republic	1:00:07.23
14	Víctor Hugo Peña	Colombia	1:00:09.89
15	Iván Gutiérrez	Spain	1:00:22.80
16	Rene Andrle	Czech Republic	1:00:27.29
17	Eric Wohlberg	Canada	1:00:31.49
18	Peter van Petegem	Belgium	1:00:35.73
19	Frank Høj	Denmark	1:00:37.49
20	Thomas Dekker	Netherlands	1:00:38.05
21	László Bodrogi	Hungary	1:00:44.31
22	Serhiy Honchar	Ukraine	1:01:00.47
23	Evgeny Vakker	Kyrgyzstan	1:01:21.10
24	Sérgio Paulinho	Portugal	1:01:25.63
25	Benoît Joachim	Luxembourg	1:01:50.46
26	Rubens Bertogliati	Switzerland	1:02:16.56
27	Kurt Asle Arvesen	Norway	1:02:21.28
28	Evgeni Petrov	Russia	1:02:50.32
29	Stuart Dangerfield	Great Britain	1:03:00.72
30	Dawid Krupa	Poland	1:03:07.05
31	Thor Hushovd	Norway	1:03:10.36
32	Heath Blackgrove	New Zealand	1:03:20.11
33	Thomas Löfkvist	Sweden	1:03:43.70
34	Gorazd Štangelj	Slovenia	1:03:45:84
35	Matej Jurčo	Slovakia	1:04:22.58
36	Slawomir Kohut	Poland	1:06:19.29
—	Andrey Kashechkin	Kazakhstan	DNF
—	Robert Hunter	South Africa	DNS
—	Filippo Pozzato	Italy	DNS
DSQ	Tyler Hamilton	United States	~~57:31.74~~

(DNS/F = Did Not Start/Finish)
