= 2003 UCI Road World Championships – Men's time trial =

Men's Individual Time Trial
2003 UCI Road World Championships
- Rainbow jersey

Race details
- Dates: 9 October 2003
- Stages: 1
- Distance: 41.6 km (25.85 mi)
- Winning time: 51' 17.29"

Results
	Winner	~~David Millar~~ (GBR)	(~~Great Britain~~)
	Second	Michael Rogers (AUS)	(Australia)
	Third	Uwe Peschel (GER)	(Germany)

The Men's Individual Time Trial at the 2003 UCI Road World Championships was the 10th edition of the event. The race took place on 9 October 2003 in Hamilton, Canada. The race was initially won by David Millar of Great Britain. Following Millar's confession of doping, the win was attributed to Michael Rogers of Australia.

== Final classification ==
General classification (1–10)

Rank	Rider	Time
1st place, gold medalist(s)	~~David Millar (GBR)~~	~~51' 17.29"~~
2nd place, silver medalist(s)	Michael Rogers (AUS)	+ 1' 25.09"
3rd place, bronze medalist(s)	Uwe Peschel (GER)	+ 1' 25.65"
4	Michael Rich (GER)	+ 1' 35.68"
5	Isidro Nozal (ESP)	+ 1' 39.50"
6	Dario Frigo (ITA)	+ 1' 51.53"
7	Viatcheslav Ekimov (RUS)	+ 1' 58.38"
8	Marc Wauters (BEL)	+ 2' 07.35"
9	Michal Hrazdíra (CZE)	+ 2' 13.35"
10	Bert Roesems (BEL)	+ 2' 15.80"
