= 2004 UCI Road World Championships – Men's time trial =

Men's Time Trial
2004 UCI Road World Championships
- Rainbow jersey

Race details
- Dates: 29 September
- Stages: 1
- Distance: 46.75 km (29.05 mi)
- Winning time: 57' 30.12"

The men's time trial at the 2004 UCI Road World Championships was held on 29 September 2004 in Bardolino (Verona), Italy.

== Classification ==
	Cyclist	Nation		Time
1st place, gold medalist(s)	Michael Rogers	Australia	in	57 min 30 s 12
2nd place, silver medalist(s)	Michael Rich	Germany	+	1 min 12 s 43
3rd place, bronze medalist(s)	Alexander Vinokourov	Kazakhstan	+	1 min 25 s 04
4	Gustav Larsson	Sweden	+	1 min 34 s 47
DSQ	~~David Zabriskie~~ (Note: David Zabriskie, finishing 5th, was disqualified by the UCI in 2012)	United States	+	1 min 36 s 86
6	Marzio Bruseghin	Italy	+	1 min 37 s 26
7	Marc Wauters	Belgium	+	1 min 56 s 33
8	Fabian Cancellara	Switzerland	+	2 min 10 s 67
9	José Iván Gutiérrez	Spain	+	2 min 23 s 12
10	Uwe Peschel	Germany	+	2 min 28 s 75
11	Andrea Peron	Italy	+	2 min 32 s 03
12	Brian Vandborg	Denmark	+	2 min 34 s 87
13	Bert Roesems	Belgium	+	2 min 36 s 17
14	Eddy Seigneur	France	+	2 min 41 s 66
15	David McCann	Ireland	+	2 min 44 s 82
16	Przemysław Niemiec	Poland	+	2 min 59 s 58
17	Dmitri Semov	Russia	+	3 min 05 s 75
18	Ivaïlo Gabrovski	Bulgaria	+	3 min 16 s 39
19	Sergiy Matveyev	Ukraine	+	3 min 38 s 99
20	László Bodrogi	Hungary	+	3 min 40 s 47
21	Frédéric Finot	France	+	3 min 42 s 63
22	Eric Wohlberg	Canada	+	3 min 48 s 56
23	Joost Posthuma	Netherlands	+	3 min 50 s 03
24	Ruslan Ivanov	Moldova	+	3 min 54 s 66
25	Bradley McGee	Australia	+	4 min 08 s 28
26	Iván Parra	Colombia	+	4 min 11 s 82
27	Jean Nuttli	Switzerland	+	4 min 15 s 61
28	Michael Blaudzun	Denmark	+	4 min 19 s 56
29	Víctor Hugo Peña	Colombia	+	4 min 22 s 63
30	Michal Hrazdíra	Czech Republic	+	4 min 24 s 12
31	Marcus Ljungqvist	Sweden	+	4 min 27 s 73
32	Svein Tuft	Canada	+	4 min 46 s 73
33	Gregor Gazvoda	Slovenia	+	4 min 57 s 56
34	Isidro Nozal	Spain	+	5 min 02 s 64
35	Thomas Danielson	United States	+	5 min 06 s 21
36	Benoît Joachim	Luxembourg	+	5 min 07 s 68
37	Denis Shkarpeta	Uzbekistan	+	5 min 31 s 26
38	David O'Loughlin	Ireland	+	5 min 32 s 24
39	Oleg Zhukov	Russia	+	5 min 45 s 49
40	Yuriy Krivtsov	Ukraine	+	5 min 48 s 08
41	Raivis Belohvoščiks	Latvia	+	5 min 57 s 77
42	Krzysztof Ciesielski	Poland	+	6 min 07 s 43
43	Martin Prázdnovský	Slovakia	+	6 min 48 s 92
44	Csaba Szekeres	Hungary	+	7 min 19 s 98
45	Rafael Nuritdinov	Uzbekistan	+	7 min 52 s 57
46	Dean Podgornik	Slovenia	+	8 min 33 s 77
DSQ	Bart Voskamp	Netherlands	+	
