= 2005 UCI Road World Championships – Men's time trial =

Men's Individual Time Trial
2005 UCI Road World Championships
- Rainbow jersey

Race details
- Dates: 2005-09-22 in (Spain) Madrid (ESP)
- Stages: 1
- Distance: 44.1 km (27.40 mi)
- Winning time: 00h 53' 34"

Results
	Winner	Michael Rogers (AUS)	(Australia)
	Second	Iván Gutiérrez (ESP)	(Spain)
	Third	Fabian Cancellara (SUI)	(Switzerland)

The Men's Individual Time Trial at the 2005 UCI Road World Championships was held on the second day of the event. Australian Michael Rogers took his third straight crown as TT World Champion, after winning in 2003 in Hamilton (Canada) and in 2004 in Bardolino (Italy).

== Final classification ==
Rank	Rider	Time
1st place, gold medalist(s)	Michael Rogers (AUS)	00:53.34
2nd place, silver medalist(s)	Iván Gutiérrez (ESP)	+ 0.23.77
3rd place, bronze medalist(s)	Fabian Cancellara (SUI)	+ 0.23.89
4.	Rubén Plaza (ESP)	+ 0.44.06
5.	Alexander Vinokourov (KAZ)	+ 1.20.24
6.	Andrey Kaschechkin (KAZ)	+ 1.29.00
7.	Bradley Wiggins (GBR)	+ 1.31.60
8.	Sebastian Lang (GER)	+ 1.35.32
9.	Matías Médici (ARG)	+ 1.37.07
10.	Víctor Hugo Peña (COL)	+ 1.41.27
11.	Bobby Julich (USA)	+ 1.45.37
12.	Ondřej Sosenka (CZE)	+ 1.55.49
13.	Benjamin Day (AUS)	+ 2.05.46
14.	Marzio Bruseghin (ITA)	+ 2.11.68
15.	Michael Rich (GER)	+ 2.13.96
16.	Raivis Belohvoščiks (LAT)	+ 2.16.75
17.	Marco Pinotti (ITA)	+ 2.22.78
18.	Vasil Kiryienka (BLR)	+ 2.26.00
19.	Janez Brajkovič (SLO)	+ 2.29.61
20.	Jan Hruška (CZE)	+ 2.37.59
21.	Brian Vandborg (DEN)	+ 2.42.54
22.	Ryder Hesjedal (CAN)	+ 2.42.82
23.	Denis Menchov (RUS)	+ 2.45.17
24.	Bert Roesems (BEL)	+ 2.49.49
25.	Gregor Gazvoda (SLO)	+ 2.56.49
26.	James Lewis Perry (RSA)	+ 2.58.93
27.	Gustav Larsson (SWE)	+ 3.00.17
28.	Viacheslav Ekimov (RUS)	+ 3.07.10
29.	Fumiyuki Beppu (JPN)	+ 3.12.88
30.	Sylvain Chavanel (FRA)	+ 3.18.53
31.	Leif Hoste (BEL)	+ 3.19.68
32.	Yaroslav Popovych (UKR)	+ 3.27.63
33.	Peter Mazur (POL)	+ 3.37.28
34.	Eric Wohlberg (CAN)	+ 3.40.32
35.	Thomas Dekker (NED)	+ 3.44.53
36.	David George (RSA)	+ 3.46.81
37.	Joost Posthuma (NED)	+ 3.48.98
38.	David O'Loughlin (IRL)	+ 3.52.09
39.	Michael Blaudzun (DEN)	+ 3.55.77
40.	Andriy Hrivko (UKR)	+ 4.00.49
41.	Łukasz Bodnar (POL)	+ 4.49.63
42.	Juan Carlos López (COL)	+ 4.54.18
43.	Linas Balčiūnas (LTU)	+ 4.58.35
44.	Christophe Moreau (FRA)	+ 5.07.11
45.	Csaba Szekeres (HUN)	+ 5.13.34
46.	Thomas Lövkvist (SWE)	+ 5.40.66
47.	Denis Shkarpeta (UZB)	+ 5.49.93
48.	Tommi Martikainen (FIN)	+ 7.13.87
—	Ivailo Gabrovski (BUL)	DNS
