= Kanstantsin Sivtsov =

Belarusian road bicycle racer

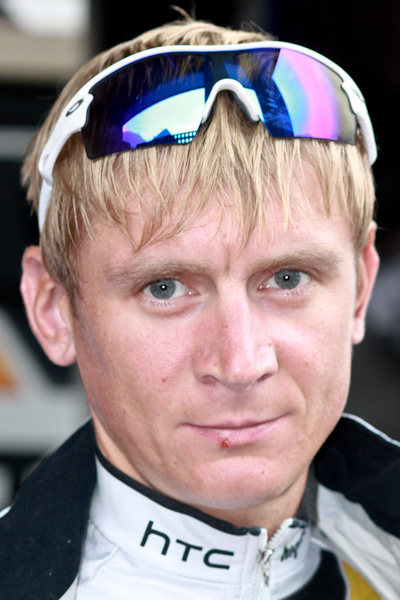
- Sivtsov at the 2011 Critérium du Dauphiné

Personal information
- Full name: Kanstantsin Sivtsov; Канстанцін Сіўцоў
- Nickname: Kosta
- Born: 9 August 1982 (age 44) Gomel, Byelorussian SSR, Soviet Union
- Height: 1.84 m (6 ft 0 in)
- Weight: 69 kg (152 lb; 10.9 st)

Cycling career
- Sport: Cycling
- Current team: Retired
- Discipline: Road
- Role: Rider
- Rider type: All-rounder

Professional teams
- 2001–2002: Itera
- 2003: Lokomotiv
- 2005: Fassa Bortolo
- 2006: Acqua & Sapone
- 2007: Barloworld
- 2008–2011: Team High Road
- 2012–2015: Team Sky
- 2016: Team Dimension Data
- 2017–2018: Bahrain–Merida

Major wins
- Grand Tours Giro d'Italia 1 individual stage (2009) 1 TTT stage (2013) Stage races Tour de Georgia (2008) Tour of Croatia (2018) One-day races and Classics National Road Race Championships (2006, 2016) National Time Trial Championships (2004, 2011, 2013, 2014, 2016)
Medal record
Men's road bicycle racing
Representing Team Sky
World Championships
Bronze medal – third place	2013 Tuscany	Team time trial

Kanstantsin Sivtsov (or Siutsou (Belarusian: Канстанцін Віктаравіч Сіўцоў; Łacinka: Kanstancin Viktaravič Siŭcoŭ; born 9 August 1982) is a Belarusian former professional road bicycle racer, who rode professionally between 2001 and 2018 for the Itera, Lokomotiv, Fassa Bortolo, Acqua & Sapone, Barloworld, HTC–Highroad, Team Sky, Team Dimension Data and Bahrain–Merida squads. He retired after provisionally being suspended from the sport following an adverse analytical finding for erythropoietin (EPO).

== Career ==
Sivtsov was born in the Belarusian city of Gomel in 1982. He won the under-23 road race at the UCI Road World Championships. Sivtsov joined Barloworld for the 2007 season, and rode the Tour de France, finishing 32nd overall.

=== Team High Road (2008–11) ===
Siutsou moved to Team High Road for 2008, where he took his first stage race overall victory at the Tour de Georgia, and came 16th overall in the Tour de France. In the 2009 Giro d'Italia, Sivtsov won his first two Grand Tour stages, the team time trial on stage one and a successful solo breakaway in stage eight.

Sivtsov enjoyed his most successful year in 2011. He finished tenth overall in the Giro d'Italia – again winning the team time trial stage – with an eighth-place finish in the Critérium du Dauphiné, and won the Belarusian National Time Trial Championships for the first time.

=== Team Sky (2012–15) ===
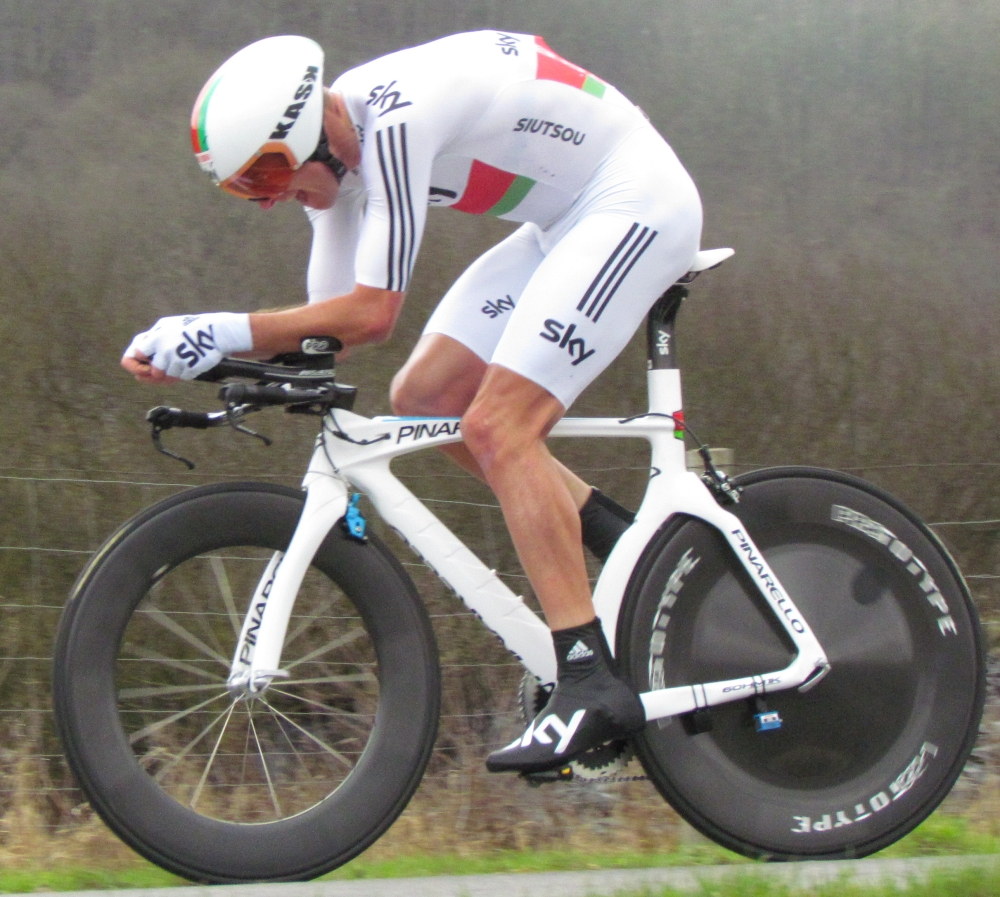
Sivtsov at the 2012 Paris–Nice

Sivtsov moved to Team Sky for the 2012 season. He was part of the teams that helped Richie Porte win the Volta ao Algarve, Bradley Wiggins win Paris–Nice, the Tour de Romandie and Critérium du Dauphiné, and Michael Rogers win Bayern–Rundfahrt. Sivtsov was selected to ride the Tour de France as one of Wiggins' main domestiques, but crashed out on stage three with 50 kilometres (31 mi) remaining with a fractured left tibia, the first retirement of the 2012 Tour.

Sivtsov claimed a solo win on stage two of the 2013 Giro del Trentino.

=== Team Dimension Data (2016) ===
In October 2015, he announced that he would be leaving Team Sky after four seasons to join Team Dimension Data for 2016.

=== Doping case ===
On 5 September 2018, the UCI announced that an out of competition test had resulted in an adverse analytical finding of Erythropoietin in a sample collected 31 July 2018. Siutsou was provisionally suspended pending the result of any B sample test. This followed his back injury sustained whilst carrying out a recon of the time trial at the Giro earlier that year.

On 23 June 2020, he was given a four-year ban for doping using EPO.

== Major results ==
2000
6th Time trial, UCI Junior Road World Championships
2002
National Road Championships

2nd Time trial
3rd Road race

2003
2nd Points race, UEC European Under-23 Track Championships
National Road Championships

2nd Road race
3rd Time trial

2004
1st Road race, UCI Under-23 Road World Championships
1st Time trial, National Road Championships
2nd Overall Volta a Lleida
4th Ruota d'Oro
2005
7th Trofeo Melinda
2006
1st Road race, National Road Championships
2nd Subida al Naranco
3rd Gran Premio Industria e Commercio Artigianato Carnaghese
4th Overall Course de la Paix

1st Young rider classification
1st Stage 5

4th Gran Premio Nobili Rubinetterie
9th Giro di Toscana
10th Giro dell'Emilia
2007
2nd Giro dell'Appennino
3rd Gran Premio Città di Camaiore
3rd Tre Valli Varesine
4th Giro del Lazio
5th Coppa Placci
8th Gran Premio di Lugano
8th Gran Premio di Chiasso
9th Overall Settimana Internazionale di Coppi e Bartali
2008
1st Overall Tour de Georgia

1st Stage 6

2009
Giro d'Italia

1st Stages 1 (TTT) & 8

9th Overall Tirreno–Adriatico
10th Overall Tour de Romandie

1st Stage 3 (TTT)

2010
1st Stage 1 (TTT) Vuelta a España
2011
National Road Championships

1st Time trial
2nd Road race

8th Overall Critérium du Dauphiné
9th Overall Giro d'Italia

1st Stage 1 (TTT)

2012
5th Overall Bayern–Rundfahrt
2013
1st Time trial, National Road Championships
Giro del Trentino

1st Stages 1b (TTT) & 2

1st Stage 2 (TTT) Giro d'Italia
UCI Road World Championships

3rd Team time trial
10th Time trial

8th Overall Route du Sud
2014
1st Time trial, National Road Championships
4th Overall Route du Sud
2015
6th Overall Settimana Internazionale di Coppi e Bartali
7th Trofeo Andratx-Mirador d'es Colomer
8th Overall Vuelta a Andalucía
2016
National Road Championships

1st Road race
1st Time trial

10th Overall Giro d'Italia
2017
6th Overall Tour of Croatia
2018
1st Overall Tour of Croatia

1st Stage 3

3rd Time trial, National Road Championships
9th Overall Vuelta a San Juan

=== Grand Tour general classification results timeline ===
Grand Tour	2007	2008	2009	2010	2011	2012	2013	2014	2015	2016	2017	2018
Giro d'Italia	—	DNF	15	—	9	—	37	DNF	26	10	35	DNS
Tour de France	31	16	—	39	—	DNF	90	—	—	—	—	—
Vuelta a España	—	—	—	37	DNF	—	—	43	—	—	—	—

Legend
—	Did not compete
DNF	Did not finish
DNS	Did not start
