= 2006 UCI Road World Championships – Men's under-23 time trial =

Cycling race

Rainbow jersey

The 2006 edition of the Men's Under-23 Time Trial World Championships took place on September 20. The Championships were hosted by the Austrian city of Salzburg, and it featured 39.54 kilometres of racing against the clock.

== Results ==
September 20, 2006: Salzburg, 39.54 km

	Cyclist	Nation	Time
1	Dominique Cornu	Belgium	49' 28.42" (47.904 km/h)
2	Mikhail Ignatiev	Russia	+ 37.10"
3	Jérôme Coppel	France	+ 44.66"
4	Alexander Filippov	Russia	+ 51.52"
5	Edvald Boasson Hagen	Norway	+ 1' 12.69"
6	Stefan Schaefer	Germany	+ 1' 21.28"
7	Logan Dennis Hutchings	New Zealand	+ 1' 25.06"
8	Simon Špilak	Slovenia	+ 1' 26.60"
9	Peter Latham	New Zealand	+ 1' 29.03"
10	Kristjan Koren	Slovenia	+ 1' 36.32"
11	Alex Rasmussen	Denmark	+ 1' 38.90"
12	Ignatas Konovalovas	Lithuania	+ 1' 41.11"
13	Maxim Belkov	Russia	+ 1' 43.21"
14	Martin Mortensen	Denmark	+ 1' 46.17"
15	Dmytro Grabovskyy	Ukraine	+ 1' 49.32"
16	Andrei Kunitski	Belarus	+ 1' 53.21"
17	Branislau Samoilau	Belarus	+ 1' 54.04"
18	Tony Martin	Germany	+ 1' 56.27"
19	Rein Taaramäe	Estonia	+ 1' 59.09"
20	Sylvain Georges	France	+ 2' 03.66"
21	Alan Marangoni	Italy	+ 2' 06.32"
22	Jos van Emden	Netherlands	+ 2' 06.87"
23	Ian Stannard	Great Britain	+ 2' 08.57"
24	Mateusz Taciak	Poland	+ 2' 14.83"
25	Rigoberto Urán Urán	Colombia	+ 2' 22.06"
26	Lars Boom	Netherlands	+ 2' 32.11"
27	Gatis Smukulis	Latvia	+ 2' 38.40"
28	Thomas Frei	Switzerland	+ 2' 41.97"
29	Shaun Higgerson	Australia	+ 2' 47.08"
30	Steven Cozza	United States	+ 2' 47.45"
31	Martin Velits	Slovakia	+ 2' 51.03"
32	Luca Barla	Italy	+ 2' 56.54"
33	Mark Jamieson	Australia	+ 3' 13.66"
34	Alexandr Pliuschkin	Moldova	+ 3' 14.69"
35	Andrey Zeits	Kazakhstan	+ 3' 27.74"
36	Chris Froome	Kenya	+ 3' 32.28"
37	Ruslan Sambris	Moldova	+ 3' 37.66"
38	Peter Velits	Slovakia	+ 3' 50.71"
39	Hyun Wook Joo	Korea	+ 3' 52.90"
40	Brent Bookwalter	United States	+ 3' 53.79"
41	Berik Kupeshov	Kazakhstan	+ 3' 58.15"
42	Oleksan. Surutkovych	Ukraine	+ 4' 00.54"
43	Bradley Fairall	Canada	+ 4' 07.77"
44	Ryan Connor	Ireland	+ 4' 08.13"
45	Maciej Bodnar	Poland	+ 4' 08.40"
46	Stefan Denifl	Austria	+ 4' 32.57"
47	Federico Pagani	Argentina	+ 4' 38.69"
48	Fabio Duarte Arevalo	Colombia	+ 4' 40.51"
49	Abdelkad. Belmokhtar	Algeria	+ 4' 51.40"
50	David Veilleux	Canada	+ 5' 00.40"
51	Stefan Kushlev	Bulgaria	+ 5' 13.48"
52	Gert Jõeäär	Estonia	+ 5' 22.27"
53	Adrian Hegyvari	Hungary	+ 5' 38.64"
54	Javier Chacon Quesada	Spain	+ 5' 40.91"
55	Jorge Soto	Uruguay	+ 5' 47.19"
56	Juan. Fernandez Mora	Spain	+ 5' 51.63"
57	Lukas Sablik	Czech Republic	+ 6' 07.18"
58	Akos Haiszer	Hungary	+ 6' 15.02"
59	Mohamed. Aoun Seghir	Algeria	+ 10' 13.51"
DNS	Abund. Guerrero Mata	Mexico	
DNS	Magno Nazaret	Brazil	
