= 2012 Tour de Romandie =

2012 UCI World Tour, race 14 of 28
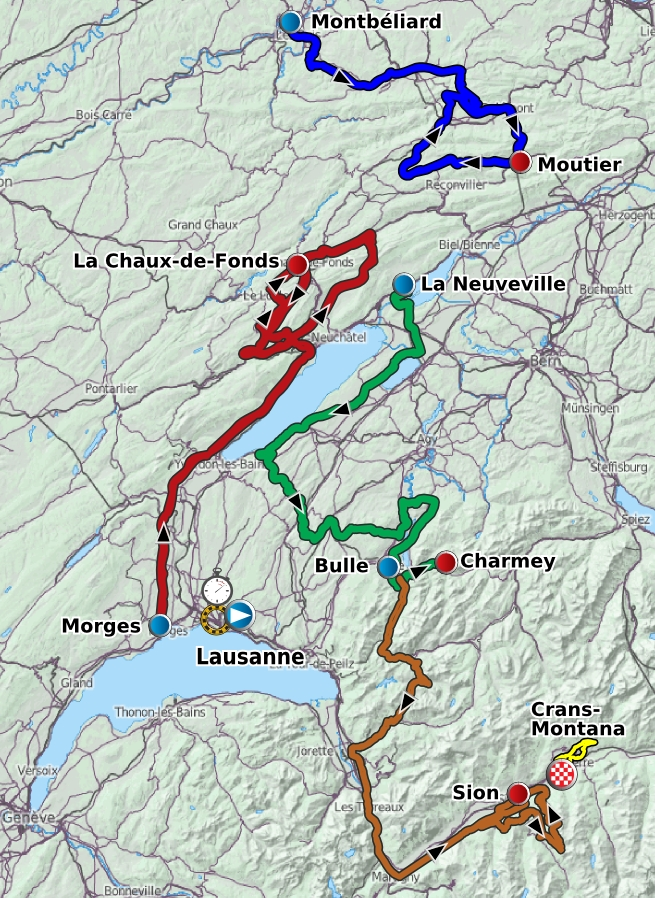

Race details
- Dates: 24–29 April 2012
- Stages: 5 + Prologue
- Distance: 695.04 km (431.88 mi)
- Winning time: 18h 05' 40"

Results
Jersey awarded to the overall winner	Winner	Bradley Wiggins (GBR)	(Team Sky)
	Second	Andrew Talansky (USA)	(Garmin–Barracuda)
	Third	Rui Costa (POR)	(Movistar Team)
Jersey awarded to the mountains classification winner	Mountains	Petr Ignatenko (RUS)	(Team Katusha)
Jersey awarded to the young rider classification winner	Young rider	Andrew Talansky (USA)	(Garmin–Barracuda)
	Team	Team Sky	

The 2012 Tour de Romandie was the 66th running of the Tour de Romandie cycling stage race. It started on 24 April in Lausanne and ended on 29 April in Crans-Montana and consisted of six stages, including a race-commencing prologue stage and a race-concluding individual time trial. It was the 14th race of the 2012 UCI World Tour season.

The race was won by Great Britain's Bradley Wiggins of Team Sky, after winning two stages including the final stage time trial, to take the general classification on the final day. Wiggins won the general classification by 12 seconds over runner-up Andrew Talansky of Garmin–Barracuda, who finished second to Wiggins in the final stage; Talansky also won the young rider classification title. Third place was taken by Movistar Team's Rui Costa after he also put in a strong performance in the time trial, and gained sufficient time to move up from ninth overnight.

In the race's other classifications, Petr Ignatenko of Team Katusha won both the green jersey for the most points gained in intermediate sprints, and the pink jersey for the King of the Mountains classification, while Team Sky finished at the head of the teams classification, with three of the squad's riders – Wiggins, Richie Porte and Michael Rogers – finishing in the overall top five.

== Participating teams ==
As the Tour de Romandie was a UCI World Tour event, all 18 UCI ProTeams were invited automatically and obligated to send a squad. Two other squads were given wildcard places into the race, and as such, formed the event's 20-team peloton.

The 20 teams that competed in the race were:

- Ag2r–La Mondiale
- Astana
- BMC Racing Team
- Team Europcar
- Euskaltel–Euskadi
- FDJ–BigMat
- Garmin–Barracuda
- GreenEDGE
- Team Katusha
- Lampre–ISD
- Liquigas–Cannondale
- Lotto–Belisol
- Movistar Team
- Omega Pharma–Quick-Step
- Rabobank
- RadioShack–Nissan
- Saur–Sojasun
- Team Saxo Bank
- Team Sky
- Vacansoleil–DCM

== Stages ==
=== Prologue ===
24 April 2012 — Lausanne, 3.34 kilometres (2.08 mi), individual time trial (ITT)

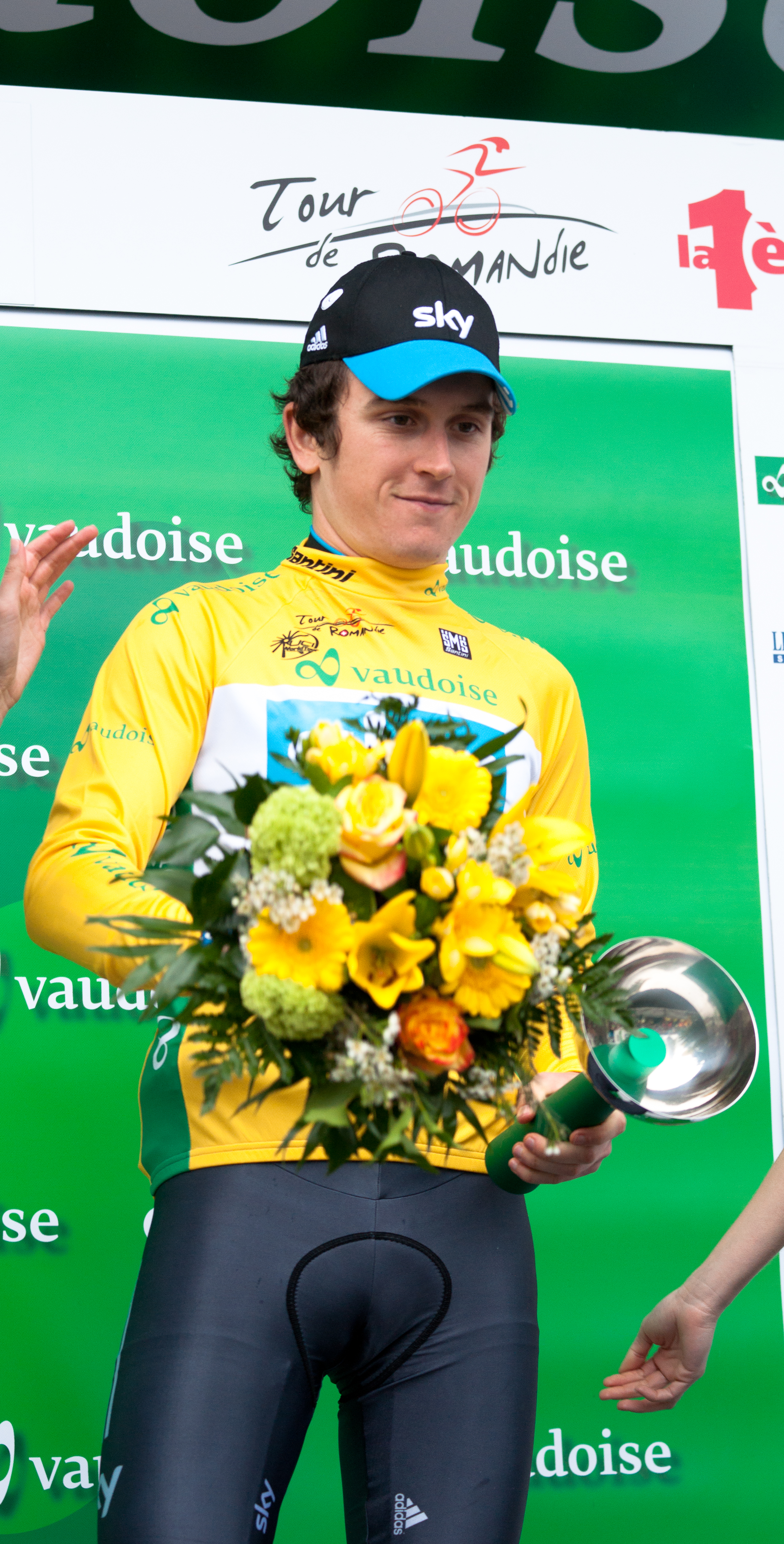
Team Sky's Geraint Thomas on the podium after winning the stage in Lausanne. Thomas was one of three Team Sky riders to place inside the top five of the stage results, along with team-mates Michael Rogers and Mark Cavendish.

The race began once again with a short prologue stage held in and around Lausanne; the stage returning to the city after the race visited Martigny for the prologue in the 2011 edition of the race. The stage itself, 3.34 km (2.1 mi) in length, was relatively flat, dropping only 39 metres (128 ft) in altitude from the start, to the end. With rain expected to disrupt the stage, teams decided to spread their time trial specialists across the field in order to maximise their potential of winning the stage. For the first rider to depart the start in Lausanne, Saur–Sojasun's Maxime Méderel, weather conditions were dry. Mederel ultimately recorded a time of 3' 51" for the stage, but his time only held for a minute as Team Europcar's Franck Bouyer completed the course 2.1 seconds quicker. Ramūnas Navardauskas (Garmin–Barracuda) improved upon Bouyer's time by almost ten seconds, recording a time one-hundredth inside 3' 40".

Navardauskas' time was marginally quicker than the times of Rabobank's Maarten Wynants and his own Garmin–Barracuda team-mate David Zabriskie, with the trio of riders maintaining their lead positions until the end of the second wave of riders, when Martin Velits assumed the lead for Omega Pharma–Quick-Step. Velits completed the course four tenths of a second faster than what Navardauskas had achieved; but he was to only hold the lead for around quarter of an hour, as in the third wave of riders to start the prologue, Stef Clement took the lead for Rabobank; the former Dutch national champion in the discipline completed the course in slightly over 3' 37". Clement's time held for a while, as riders struggled to match the pace that he had set; it was not until Giacomo Nizzolo, a rider regarded as a sprinter at the RadioShack–Nissan team, recorded a time of 3' 34". Only one rider bettered his time for the course, and it was the rider that started immediately after him; Geraint Thomas (Team Sky) set the fastest time of 3' 29", taking his team's fourteenth victory of the year, and his first since returning to the roads after a successful UCI Track World Championships, where he claimed a gold medal and a silver medal. Although he won the stage, Thomas' focus for the race was to support Mark Cavendish and Bradley Wiggins in their respective classifications.

After these two placings had been wrapped up, further riders from Team Sky, Omega Pharma–Quick-Step and Rabobank looked to place themselves among the top ten riders for the stage. Kristof Vandewalle was third for a time, recording a 3' 35" for the parcours, before his time was bettered by Michael Rogers and then Cavendish, who set his time just as the weather conditions changed; rain began to become a factor in the stage proceedings from then on. With these conditions, it guaranteed most of the top ten placings for the early runners but Manuele Boaro recorded the best time of those that went out later in the start order; eventually setting the ninth-fastest time for the stage, with Alex Rasmussen rounding out the top ten for Garmin–Barracuda. Overall contenders Tejay van Garderen (BMC Racing Team), Jérôme Coppel (Saur–Sojasun), as well as Wiggins and van Garderen's team-mate Cadel Evans all finished outside the top ten after starting in the worst of the conditions; Wiggins placed best in eleventh, having again encountered wet conditions as he had done in the opening stage of March's Paris–Nice race.

Prologue results
Rank	Rider	Team	Time
1	Geraint Thomas (GBR)	Team Sky	3' 29"
2	Giacomo Nizzolo (ITA)	RadioShack–Nissan	+ 5"
3	Mark Cavendish (GBR)	Team Sky	+ 6"
4	Michael Rogers (AUS)	Team Sky	+ 6"
5	Kristof Vandewalle (BEL)	Omega Pharma–Quick-Step	+ 6"
6	Julien Vermote (BEL)	Omega Pharma–Quick-Step	+ 8"
7	Bauke Mollema (NED)	Rabobank	+ 8"
8	Stef Clement (NED)	Rabobank	+ 8"
9	Manuele Boaro (ITA)	Team Saxo Bank	+ 9"
10	Alex Rasmussen (DEN)	Garmin–Barracuda	+ 9"

General classification after Prologue
Rank	Rider	Team	Time
1	Geraint Thomas (GBR)	Team Sky	3' 29"
2	Giacomo Nizzolo (ITA)	RadioShack–Nissan	+ 5"
3	Mark Cavendish (GBR)	Team Sky	+ 6"
4	Michael Rogers (AUS)	Team Sky	+ 6"
5	Kristof Vandewalle (BEL)	Omega Pharma–Quick-Step	+ 6"
6	Julien Vermote (BEL)	Omega Pharma–Quick-Step	+ 8"
7	Bauke Mollema (NED)	Rabobank	+ 8"
8	Stef Clement (NED)	Rabobank	+ 8"
9	Manuele Boaro (ITA)	Team Saxo Bank	+ 9"
10	Alex Rasmussen (DEN)	Garmin–Barracuda	+ 9"

=== Stage 1 ===
25 April 2012 — Morges to La Chaux-de-Fonds, 184.5 kilometres (114.6 mi)

Four riders – BMC Racing Team's Martin Kohler, Kenny Dehaes of Lotto–Belisol, Angelo Tulik (Team Europcar) and Saur–Sojasun rider Jimmy Engoulvent – advanced clear of the main field in the early running of the stage; the quartet managed to extend their advantage to a maximum of over five minutes around a third of the way through the stage. With all the riders close together time-wise following the prologue stage, Team Sky were mainstays at the front of the peloton, trying to chip away at the advantage of the breakaway prior to the final finishing loop of 65 km (40.4 mi) around La Chaux-de-Fonds. The quartet held an advantage of just under three-and-a-half minutes over the main field as the pack came across the line for the first time.

Team Sky were in formation at the head of the field, with the entire team except for Richie Porte, setting the tempo and continued to steadily cutting into the advantage that the lead four riders held; with 50 km (31.1 mi), the gap had been cut to around 2' 20", with Liquigas–Cannondale also shadowing the British squad, but allowing them to take a free range of the pace being set. Over the next 20 km (12.4 mi), the leaders' gap was cut to around a minute, prior to the second of the day's three categorised climbs, the second-category Haut de la Côte. Continued pressure at the head of the main field meant that riders were dislodged from the rear of pack, and those included prologue winner Geraint Thomas and Mark Cavendish. The breakaway was absorbed on the climb with Kohler trying to get clear but a counter-attack from Engoulvent's team-mate Fabrice Jeandesboz put him clear at the summit, although he was later brought back by the field.

With his team on the front, Bradley Wiggins suffered a puncture at around 25 km (15.5 mi) to go, but with Porte, Michael Rogers and Kanstantsin Sivtsov around him for pacing, they all latched back on to the peloton prior to the final climb of the day, Le Communal de la Sagne at 13 km (8.1 mi) remaining. Out front at this point was a seven-rider move representing six teams but could not sustain a meaningful gap ahead of the main field. Several mini-moves tried to get away with force after the descent from the climb, but BMC Racing Team started to push forward in the pack, and helping out Team Sky with the pace-making and their protection of team leader Cadel Evans. Jeandesboz and Pierre Rolland (Team Europcar) were the last riders to attempt a move but were caught by the now-pacemaking Rabobank and Liquigas–Cannondale teams in the closing stages. The latter squad's Polish tandem Sylwester Szmyd and Maciej Paterski looked to gain distance at the front of the field ahead of the sprint, but an elongated move from Wiggins ultimately proved successful as the British national champion managed to hold off on the front, to take the leader's jersey on the line. Behind him, his rival from Paris–Nice, Lieuwe Westra (Vacansoleil–DCM) finished second ahead of Paolo Tiralongo for Astana.

Stage 1 results
Rank	Rider	Team	Time
1	Bradley Wiggins (GBR)	Team Sky	4h 50' 23"
2	Lieuwe Westra (NED)	Vacansoleil–DCM	+ 0"
3	Paolo Tiralongo (ITA)	Astana	+ 0"
4	Tejay Van Garderen (USA)	BMC Racing Team	+ 0"
5	Maciej Paterski (POL)	Liquigas–Cannondale	+ 0"
6	Vasil Kiryienka (BLR)	Movistar Team	+ 0"
7	Serge Pauwels (BEL)	Omega Pharma–Quick-Step	+ 0"
8	Daniele Pietropolli (ITA)	Lampre–ISD	+ 0"
9	Ryder Hesjedal (CAN)	Garmin–Barracuda	+ 0"
10	Pieter Weening (NED)	GreenEDGE	+ 0"

General classification after stage 1
Rank	Rider	Team	Time
1	Bradley Wiggins (GBR)	Team Sky	4h 53' 51"
2	Michael Rogers (AUS)	Team Sky	+ 7"
3	Bauke Mollema (NED)	Rabobank	+ 9"
4	Stef Clement (NED)	Rabobank	+ 9"
5	Andrew Talansky (USA)	Garmin–Barracuda	+ 11"
6	Wilco Kelderman (NED)	Rabobank	+ 11"
7	David Zabriskie (USA)	Garmin–Barracuda	+ 12"
8	Simon Špilak (SLO)	Team Katusha	+ 12"
9	Rubén Plaza (SPA)	Movistar Team	+ 12"
10	Tiago Machado (POR)	RadioShack–Nissan	+ 13"

=== Stage 2 ===
26 April 2012 — Montbéliard (France) to Moutier, 149.1 kilometres (92.6 mi)

Two riders – GreenEDGE's Christian Meier and Lotto–Belisol rider Lars Bak – went clear of the main field in the early running of the stage – beginning just over the Swiss-French border in the city of Montbéliard – and managed to extend their advantage to a maximum of almost four minutes at one stage of the parcours, slightly less than the advantage that was given to a breakaway quartet the previous day. Between them, Bak led across each of the three categorised climbs during the day – taking the pink jersey at the end of the stage, as the mountains classification leader – while Meier claimed the honours at the first of two intermediate sprints during the stage, coming after 63.2 km (39.3 mi) in Delémont. Meier and Bak held their advantage at around three minutes with around 60 km (37.3 mi) remaining.

At this point, Branislau Samoilau attacked off the front of the peloton for the Movistar Team, but could not gather a sufficient advantage from the field; with a maximum gap of just 22 seconds, Samoilau was more likely to be reabsorbed into the pack, and that scenario played out several kilometres along the parcours – at around the 40 km (24.9 mi) to go mark – with the gap to Meier and Bak dropping to just over two-and-a-half minutes as they started to tire out front, having completed over 100 km (62.1 mi) together off the head of the peloton. Team Sky were again prominent at the peloton's front; although Mark Cavendish was not part of their squadron, after having to slow back to the team car after a mechanical problem. On the La Caquerelle climb, Bak and Meier struggled off the front, with the climb reaching a gradient of 15% in places. Meier eventually cracked on the climb, leaving Bak on his own; at the summit, Bak led by just five seconds ahead of a two-man counter-attack from Fabrice Jeandesboz (Saur–Sojasun) and Garmin–Barracuda's Peter Stetina, and the peloton were eleven seconds further in arrears.

After passing Bak on the road, Jeandesboz and Stetina continued to step up the pace, putting both riders in contention to take the virtual race lead from Team Sky's Bradley Wiggins, having started the stage within 30 seconds of Wiggins in the general classification. At the second Delémont intermediate sprint – coming with just 14.2 km (8.8 mi) to go – Jeandesboz and Stetina held an advantage of 31 seconds through the point, with Stef Clement maintaining the sprints classification lead for Rabobank, by taking the single point on offer for third through the sprint. Team Sky, and later GreenEDGE, slowly brought the pair back, with Luke Durbridge setting the pace for the latter squad, and achieved the catch with 4 km (2.5 mi) to go. This ultimately set up a sprint finish in Moutier, where Stetina's team-mate Ryder Hesjedal attacked first, but was usurped by both Rui Costa (Movistar Team), and Luis León Sánchez (Rabobank); however, all three riders were beaten to the line by Jonathan Hivert, taking his first win at World Tour level for Saur–Sojasun.

Stage 2 results
Rank	Rider	Team	Time
1	Jonathan Hivert (FRA)	Saur–Sojasun	3h 48' 11"
2	Rui Costa (POR)	Movistar Team	+ 0"
3	Luis León Sánchez (SPA)	Rabobank	+ 0"
4	Gianni Meersman (BEL)	Lotto–Belisol	+ 0"
5	Ryder Hesjedal (CAN)	Garmin–Barracuda	+ 0"
6	Giacomo Nizzolo (ITA)	RadioShack–Nissan	+ 0"
7	Daniele Pietropolli (ITA)	Lampre–ISD	+ 0"
8	Eduard Vorganov	Team Katusha	+ 0"
9	Allan Davis (AUS)	GreenEDGE	+ 0"
10	Roman Kreuziger (CZE)	Astana	+ 0"

General classification after stage 2
Rank	Rider	Team	Time
1	Bradley Wiggins (GBR)	Team Sky	8h 42' 02"
2	Michael Rogers (AUS)	Team Sky	+ 7"
3	Bauke Mollema (NED)	Rabobank	+ 9"
4	Stef Clement (NED)	Rabobank	+ 9"
5	Andrew Talansky (USA)	Garmin–Barracuda	+ 11"
6	Luis León Sánchez (SPA)	Rabobank	+ 11"
7	Wilco Kelderman (NED)	Rabobank	+ 11"
8	David Zabriskie (USA)	Garmin–Barracuda	+ 12"
9	Simon Špilak (SLO)	Team Katusha	+ 12"
10	Rubén Plaza (SPA)	Movistar Team	+ 12"

=== Stage 3 ===
27 April 2012 — La Neuveville to Charmey, 157.6 kilometres (97.9 mi)

A quintet of riders – Omega Pharma–Quick-Step's Matt Brammeier, Team Katusha rider Gatis Smukulis, Leigh Howard of GreenEDGE, Lotto–Belisol's Tosh van der Sande and Team Saxo Bank rider Anders Lund – made the early breakaway from the field, and managed to extend their advantage over the main field to almost six minutes at one point during the stage. As such, the riders between them managed to take all sub-classification points on offer during the stage, at the pair of intermediate sprints – coming after 112.8 km (70.1 mi) at La Cantine and 140.1 km (87.1 mi) at Bulle respectively – and all three categorised climbs during the stage. Their advantage out front was cut methodically by the peloton – led by Team Sky, Lampre–ISD, Garmin–Barracuda and Rabobank – with the breakaway holding an advantage of about three-and-a-half minutes with around 30 km (18.6 mi) to go.

After going through the intermediate sprint at Bulle, Smukulis stepped up his pace and left his fellow breakaway riders behind him. With a gap of nearly 20 seconds over them, Smukulis tried to further the gap but was starting to lose some ground; indeed, Brammeier and van der Sande tried to kick away from Howard and Lund, but all four riders remained together behind Smukulis. The gap to the peloton was tumbling quickly, as Saur–Sojasun, the team of the previous day's winner Jonathan Hivert, were striving on the front of the main field. After all bar Smukulis were caught outside of 5 km (3.1 mi) remaining, Smukulis was brought back within the following kilometre. Further attacks from Saur–Sojasun's Fabrice Jeandesboz, Astana pair Roman Kreuziger and Janez Brajkovič, Team Katusha's Simon Špilak as well as Vacansoleil–DCM rider Johnny Hoogerland were all thwarted quickly.

With their main sprinter Michael Matthews not in contention in the peloton, Rabobank put their sprint hopes in Luis León Sánchez, who had finished third into Moutier. Indeed, once Hoogerland had been caught within the final 500 m (1,600 ft), Team Sky had Richie Porte and Michael Rogers pace race leader Bradley Wiggins on the front of the field, with Sánchez in position in third wheel behind Rogers and Wiggins, after Porte had fallen back. Sánchez launched his sprint first and was chased by Lotto–Belisol's Gianni Meersman and Astana rider Paolo Tiralongo – both of whom had taken top-five stage placings in the race to that point – as well as the leader of the young rider classification, Andrew Talansky of Garmin–Barracuda. Sánchez held his line to the far right of the road, pushing Meersman towards the barrier on the run-in, which left him frustrated; as he crossed the line behind Sánchez, in second place, he raised hand in protest at the finish. His team protested the sprint, but the race commissaires took no further action. Sánchez moved into second place overall behind Wiggins; a ten-second bonus for winning the stage reduced his deficit to Wiggins to just one second.

Stage 3 results
Rank	Rider	Team	Time
1	Luis León Sánchez (SPA)	Rabobank	3h 58' 29"
2	Gianni Meersman (BEL)	Lotto–Belisol	+ 0"
3	Paolo Tiralongo (ITA)	Astana	+ 0"
4	Andrew Talansky (USA)	Garmin–Barracuda	+ 0"
5	Bauke Mollema (NED)	Rabobank	+ 0"
6	Rinaldo Nocentini (ITA)	Ag2r–La Mondiale	+ 0"
7	Maciej Paterski (POL)	Liquigas–Cannondale	+ 0"
~~8~~	~~Giampaolo Caruso~~ (ITA)	~~Team Katusha~~	~~+ 0"~~
9	Gorka Verdugo (SPA)	Euskaltel–Euskadi	+ 0"
10	Fabrice Jeandesboz (FRA)	Saur–Sojasun	+ 0"

General classification after stage 3
Rank	Rider	Team	Time
1	Bradley Wiggins (GBR)	Team Sky	12h 40' 31"
2	Luis León Sánchez (SPA)	Rabobank	+ 1"
3	Michael Rogers (AUS)	Team Sky	+ 7"
4	Bauke Mollema (NED)	Rabobank	+ 9"
5	Stef Clement (NED)	Rabobank	+ 9"
6	Andrew Talansky (USA)	Garmin–Barracuda	+ 11"
7	Wilco Kelderman (NED)	Rabobank	+ 11"
8	David Zabriskie (USA)	Garmin–Barracuda	+ 12"
9	Simon Špilak (SLO)	Team Katusha	+ 12"
10	Rubén Plaza (SPA)	Movistar Team	+ 12"

=== Stage 4 ===
28 April 2012 — Bulle to Sion, 184 kilometres (114 mi)

The race's queen stage consisted of four categorised climbs over the 184 km (114.3 mi) parcours, including three first-category climbs; the Col des Mosses, the Piste de l'Ours and also the climb of the St-Martin, with each climb rising to in excess of 1,450 m (4,760 ft) above sea level. After several unsuccessful attacks set the course of the early running – as the field remained as one – for much of the first half-hour of racing; it was not until the Col des Mosses that the stage's primary breakaway had been formed. Six riders went clear on the climb, and the break consisted of Ag2r–La Mondiale's Jean-Christophe Péraud, Team Katusha pair Petr Ignatenko and Eduard Vorganov, BMC Racing Team's Johann Tschopp, Guillaume Levarlet (Saur–Sojasun) and Jorge Azanza of Euskaltel–Euskadi; Tschopp was best placed overall of the riders, having trailed by 25 seconds to Bradley Wiggins (Team Sky) overnight.

With Tschopp in such a prime position to Wiggins in the general classification, Wiggins' team was doing the lion's share of the work in the main field; a main field that was struggling to make headway due to the weather conditions. A strong headwind – gusting up to 60 km/h (37 mph) in places – was keeping the speeds of the chase down. The headwinds did claim one victim as Tschopp's team-mate Tejay van Garderen was struck by a falling tree branch on the descent from the Col des Mosses. He received stitches for a wound on his nose, but was forced to abandon the race; he had been lying 17th overall in the general classification, trailing Wiggins by 15 seconds, and had been just four seconds behind countryman Andrew Talansky (Garmin–Barracuda) in the under-25 classification. As the breakaway reached the finish site in Sion for the first of two passings, their advantage was around the two-minute mark over the main field. The leaders split up after the second-category climb to Basse-Nendaz, as Tschopp, Ignatenko and Levarlet left the other three riders behind and set off to try and extend their ever-reducing advantage to the main pack.

Not long later, a four-rider wave counter-attacked from the peloton; Garmin–Barracuda rider Peter Stetina was joined by Rabobank's Laurens ten Dam, Rui Costa (Movistar Team) and Giampaolo Caruso of Team Katusha, setting off in pursuit of the lead trio. They caught them with around 30 km (18.6 mi) to go, through Euseigne; but as they were doing so, the peloton were almost on their tails, and were soon absorbing the seven riders back into the midsts of the main field. On the ascent of the day's final climb, Roman Kreuziger (Astana) was one of five riders to go clear, gaining twelve seconds on the peloton as they summited the St-Martin climb; joining him were Mikel Landa of Euskaltel–Euskadi, Ag2r–La Mondiale pair John Gadret and Rinaldo Nocentini, and Team Saxo Bank's Jesús Hernández. A mini-group of around a dozen riders, including Wiggins, was prominent with around 10 km (6.2 mi) remaining. It eventually came down to a final sprint to the line in Sion, where Luis León Sánchez took the stage victory for the second consecutive day, winning by a bike length. With ten seconds on offer to the winner as a bonus, Sánchez took the race leader's yellow jersey by nine seconds from Wiggins, ahead of the final stage time trial. Nocentini finished second on the stage, with Movistar Team's Branislau Samoilau completing the podium.

Stage 4 results
Rank	Rider	Team	Time
1	Luis León Sánchez (SPA)	Rabobank	4h 56' 13"
2	Rinaldo Nocentini (ITA)	Ag2r–La Mondiale	+ 0"
3	Branislau Samoilau (BLR)	Movistar Team	+ 0"
4	Gorka Verdugo (SPA)	Euskaltel–Euskadi	+ 0"
5	Paolo Tiralongo (ITA)	Astana	+ 0"
6	Pierre Rolland (FRA)	Team Europcar	+ 0"
7	Andreas Klöden (GER)	RadioShack–Nissan	+ 0"
8	Cadel Evans (AUS)	BMC Racing Team	+ 0"
9	Roman Kreuziger (CZE)	Astana	+ 0"
10	Fabrice Jeandesboz (FRA)	Saur–Sojasun	+ 0"

General classification after stage 4
Rank	Rider	Team	Time
1	Luis León Sánchez (SPA)	Rabobank	17h 36' 35"
2	Bradley Wiggins (GBR)	Team Sky	+ 9"
3	Michael Rogers (AUS)	Team Sky	+ 16"
4	Bauke Mollema (NED)	Rabobank	+ 18"
5	Stef Clement (NED)	Rabobank	+ 18"
6	Andrew Talansky (USA)	Garmin–Barracuda	+ 20"
7	Wilco Kelderman (NED)	Rabobank	+ 20"
8	Simon Špilak (SLO)	Team Katusha	+ 21"
9	Rui Costa (POR)	Movistar Team	+ 22"
10	Tiago Machado (POR)	RadioShack–Nissan	+ 22"

=== Stage 5 ===
29 April 2012 — Crans-Montana, 16.5 kilometres (10.3 mi), individual time trial (ITT)

As was expected, the battle for the overall race victory came down to the final stage of the race; a technical 16.24 km (10.1 mi) individual time trial in and around the ski resort of Crans-Montana. On the parcours was the first-category climb to Aminona, which would settle the destination of that particular jersey, coming around the midpoint of the stage. As was customary of time trial stages, cyclists set off in reverse order from where they were ranked in the general classification at the end of the previous stage. Thus, Danny Pate of Team Sky, who, in 138th place, trailed overall leader Luis León Sánchez (Rabobank) by forty-five minutes and twenty-six seconds, was the first rider to set off on the final stage. Pate recorded a time of 31' 20" for the course, but his team-mate Chris Froome bettered that time almost immediately, taking the benchmark through the 31-minute barrier, recording a time of 30' 41"; completing his first race on his return from a parasitic infection.

No rider could get close to that time until Nelson Oliveira assumed the lead for RadioShack–Nissan, having taken the start around fifteen minutes after Froome; Oliveira's time edged Froome's by just over a second. His stay at the top of the timesheets was brief however, as Team Saxo Bank rider Manuele Boaro, a former Italian junior national champion who placed in the top five of the race-concluding time trial at Tirreno–Adriatico, soon lowered the best time for the stage down a time of 30' 24", taking fifteen seconds off Oliveira. FDJ–BigMat rider Jérémy Roy troubled Boaro's time, but eventually finished just 0.67 seconds off the fastest time at that point; Paris–Nice opening time trial winner Gustav Larsson was eventually the first rider to go sub-thirty minutes, recording a 29' 58" for Vacansoleil–DCM. Larsson's time was soon bettered by team-mate Thomas De Gendt, who went eight seconds quicker than Larsson over the stage. De Gendt's time held to well inside the last forty riders to start the stage; with the top 37 riders in the general classification being separated by 48 seconds overnight.

De Gendt's time was eventually beaten by Thibaut Pinot, who went two seconds quicker for FDJ–BigMat, but that time was bettered substantially by the next rider through the finish, Richie Porte. Porte recorded a time of 29' 13", which was guaranteed to move him up from 32nd overall; his time was not beaten until Garmin–Barracuda's Andrew Talansky went below 29 minutes – using a time-trial bike, unlike many other riders – with a time of 28' 57" to guarantee himself the victory in the young rider classification; so dominant was his performance, that he almost caught his rival for that competition, Rabobank's Wilco Kelderman, on the road, after Kelderman had started two minutes before him. Talansky's time was only beaten by one other rider; Team Sky rider Bradley Wiggins recovered from an early mechanical problem – caused by a dropped chain – to go quickest for the course, although his margin to Talansky was a marginal 0.7 seconds. The time was more than good enough to win the race overall, as Sánchez lost over a minute as last man on the road, which dropped him from the lead to tenth place in the final standings. Behind Talansky, Rui Costa completed the overall podium for the Movistar Team, after recording the fourth-quickest stage time. Following his Paris–Nice win earlier in the year, Wiggins became the first rider to win both races in the same year since Dario Frigo in 2001.

Stage 5 results
Rank	Rider	Team	Time
1	Bradley Wiggins (GBR)	Team Sky	28' 56"
2	Andrew Talansky (USA)	Garmin–Barracuda	+ 1"
3	Richie Porte (AUS)	Team Sky	+ 17"
4	Rui Costa (POR)	Movistar Team	+ 23"
5	Roman Kreuziger (CZE)	Astana	+ 40"
6	Sylwester Szmyd (POL)	Liquigas–Cannondale	+ 42"
7	Michael Rogers (AUS)	Team Sky	+ 43"
8	Thibaut Pinot (FRA)	FDJ–BigMat	+ 52"
9	Thomas De Gendt (BEL)	Vacansoleil–DCM	+ 54"
10	Janez Brajkovič (SLO)	Astana	+ 55"

General classification after stage 5
Rank	Rider	Team	Time
1	Bradley Wiggins (GBR)	Team Sky	18h 05' 40"
2	Andrew Talansky (USA)	Garmin–Barracuda	+ 12"
3	Rui Costa (POR)	Movistar Team	+ 36"
4	Richie Porte (AUS)	Team Sky	+ 45"
5	Michael Rogers (AUS)	Team Sky	+ 50"
6	Roman Kreuziger (CZE)	Astana	+ 59"
7	Sylwester Szmyd (POL)	Liquigas–Cannondale	+ 1' 03"
8	Simon Špilak (SLO)	Team Katusha	+ 1' 13"
9	Janez Brajkovič (SLO)	Astana	+ 1' 14"
10	Luis León Sánchez (SPA)	Rabobank	+ 1' 15"

== Classification leadership table ==
In the 2012 Tour de Romandie, four different jerseys were awarded. For the general classification, calculated by adding each cyclist's finishing times on each stage, and allowing time bonuses in mass-start stages, the leader received a yellow jersey. This classification was considered the most important of the 2012 Tour de Romandie, and the winner of the classification was considered the winner of the race.

Additionally, there was a young rider classification, which awarded a white jersey. This was decided the same way as the general classification, but only riders born after 1 January 1987 were eligible to be ranked in the classification. There was also a mountains classification, the leadership of which was marked by a pink jersey. In the mountains classification, points were won by reaching the top of a climb before other cyclists, with more points available for the higher-categorised climbs.

The fourth jersey represented the sprints classification, marked by a green jersey. In the sprints classification, cyclists received points for finishing in the top 3 at intermediate sprint points during each stage, with the exception of the individual time trial stages. There was also a classification for teams, in which the times of the best three cyclists per team on each stage were added together; the leading team at the end of the race was the team with the lowest total time.

Stage	Winner	General classification	Mountains classification	Young rider classification	Team classification
P	Geraint Thomas	Geraint Thomas	not awarded	Giacomo Nizzolo	Team Sky
1	Bradley Wiggins	Bradley Wiggins	Fabrice Jeandesboz	Andrew Talansky	Team Sky
2	Jonathan Hivert	Bradley Wiggins	Lars Bak	Andrew Talansky	Team Sky
3	Luis León Sánchez	Bradley Wiggins	Lars Bak	Andrew Talansky	Team Sky
4	Luis León Sánchez	Luis León Sánchez	Petr Ignatenko	Andrew Talansky	Team Sky
5	Bradley Wiggins	Bradley Wiggins	Petr Ignatenko	Andrew Talansky	Team Sky
Final		Bradley Wiggins	Petr Ignatenko	Andrew Talansky	Team Sky

== Classification standings ==
=== General classification ===
Final general classification (1–10)
Rank	Rider	Team	Time
1	Bradley Wiggins (GBR)	Team Sky	18h 05' 40"
2	Andrew Talansky (USA)	Garmin–Barracuda	+ 12"
3	Rui Costa (POR)	Movistar Team	+ 36"
4	Richie Porte (AUS)	Team Sky	+ 45"
5	Michael Rogers (AUS)	Team Sky	+ 50"
6	Roman Kreuziger (CZE)	Astana	+ 59"
7	Sylwester Szmyd (POL)	Liquigas–Cannondale	+ 1' 03"
8	Simon Špilak (SLO)	Team Katusha	+ 1' 13"
9	Janez Brajkovič (SLO)	Astana	+ 1' 14"
10	Luis León Sánchez (SPA)	Rabobank	+ 1' 15"

=== Mountains classification ===
Final mountains classification (1–10)
Rank	Rider	Team	Points
1	Petr Ignatenko	Team Katusha	24
2	Lars Bak (DEN)	Lotto–Belisol	21
3	Johann Tschopp (SWI)	BMC Racing Team	20
4	Guillaume Levarlet (FRA)	Saur–Sojasun	18
5	Roman Kreuziger (CZE)	Astana	16
6	Fabrice Jeandesboz (FRA)	Saur–Sojasun	15
7	Eduard Vorganov	Team Katusha	14
8	Richie Porte (AUS)	Team Sky	13
9	Gatis Smukulis (LAT)	Team Katusha	13
10	Martin Kohler (SWI)	BMC Racing Team	12

=== Young rider classification ===
Final young rider classification (1–10)
Rank	Rider	Team	Time
1	Andrew Talansky (USA)	Garmin–Barracuda	18h 05' 52"
2	Thibaut Pinot (FRA)	FDJ–BigMat	+ 1' 09"
3	Wilco Kelderman (NED)	Rabobank	+ 1' 57"
4	Mikel Landa (SPA)	Euskaltel–Euskadi	+ 2' 48"
5	George Bennett (NZL)	RadioShack–Nissan	+ 3' 12"
6	Tom-Jelte Slagter (NED)	Rabobank	+ 4' 24"
7	Kenny Elissonde (FRA)	FDJ–BigMat	+ 5' 05"
8	Ángel Madrazo (NED)	Movistar Team	+ 7' 31"
9	Romain Sicard (FRA)	Euskaltel–Euskadi	+ 22' 24"
10	Arthur Vichot (FRA)	FDJ–BigMat	+ 23' 30"

=== Team classification ===
Final team classification (1–10)
Rank	Team	Time
1	(United Kingdom) Team Sky	54h 18' 26"
2	(Kazakhstan) Astana	+ 2' 16"
3	(Spain) Movistar Team	+ 2' 56"
4	(France) Saur–Sojasun	+ 2' 56""
5	(Netherlands) Rabobank	+ 3' 17"
6	(Netherlands) RadioShack–Nissan	+ 3' 38"
7	(United States) Garmin–Barracuda	+ 4' 08"
8	(United States) BMC Racing Team	+ 5' 03"
9	(Spain) Euskaltel–Euskadi	+ 5' 30"
10	(Denmark) Team Saxo Bank	+ 5' 51"
