= 2011 Vuelta a Murcia =

Race details
- Dates: 4–6 March 2011
- Stages: 3
- Distance: 374.3 km (232.6 mi)
- Winning time: 9h 27' 18"

Results
	Winner	Jérôme Coppel (FRA)
	Second	Denis Menchov (RUS)
	Third	Wout Poels (NED)

The 2011 Vuelta a Murcia was the 27th edition of the Vuelta a Murcia cycle race and was held on 4 March to 6 March 2011. The race started in San Pedro del Pinatar and finished in Murcia. The race was initially won by Alberto Contador, whose result was later made void in favour of Jérôme Coppel.

== General classification ==
Final general classification

Rank	Rider	Time
~~1~~	~~Alberto Contador (ESP)~~	~~9h 27' 18"~~
1	Jérôme Coppel (FRA)	+ 11"
2	Denis Menchov (RUS)	+ 17"
3	Wout Poels (NED)	+ 1' 46"
5	Fabio Duarte (COL)	+ 1' 47"
6	Alexandre Geniez (FRA)	+ 2' 04"
7	Fabrice Jeandesboz (FRA)	+ 2' 06"
8	Francisco Pérez Sanchez (ESP)	+ 2' 12"
9	David Blanco (ESP)	+ 2' 21"
10	Vasil Kiryienka (BLR)	+ 2' 22"
