= Denis Shkarpeta =

Uzbekistani cyclist (born 1981)

Personal information
- Born: 9 November 1981 (age 44)

Cycling career
- Sport: Cycling
- Current team: Retired
- Discipline: Road
- Role: Rider

Amateur teams
- 2000: UC Bergamasca 1902–For 3
- 2002: Gambassi Stilneon
- 2003: Raimondi Simec Paletti
- 2004–2005: Ceramiche Pagnoncelli–FMB–Perrel

Professional teams
- 2006: Miche
- 2007: MapaMap–BantProfi

Denis Shkarpeta (born 9 November 1981) is an Uzbekistani former professional road cyclist. He competed in the time trial at the 2004, 2005 and 2006 UCI Road World Championships, as well as in the road race at the 2005 UCI Road World Championships.

== Major results ==
2003
1st Schio-Ossario del Pasubio
2004
2nd Giro del Valdarno
3rd Trofeo Città di Brescia
5th Overall Giro della Valle d'Aosta

1st Stage 4

5th Cronoscalata Internazionale Gardone
10th Overall Giro Ciclistico d'Italia
2005
1st Trofeo Torino-Biella
1st Coppa Cicogna
1st Circuito Molinese
4th Giro della Valsesia 2
6th Giro della Valsesia 1
7th Piccolo Giro di Lombardia
