= 2012 Bayern Rundfahrt =

2012 UCI Europe Tour

Race details
- Dates: 22–27 May
- Stages: 5
- Distance: 801.9 km (498.3 mi)
- Winning time: 19h 26' 20"

Results
Jersey awarded to the overall winner	Winner	Michael Rogers (AUS)	(Team Sky)
	Second	Jérôme Coppel (FRA)	(Saur–Sojasun)
	Third	Vladimir Gusev (RUS)	(Team Katusha)
Jersey awarded to the points classification winner	Points	Alessandro Petacchi (ITA)	(Lampre–ISD)
Jersey awarded to the mountains classification winner	Mountains	Steffen Radochla (GER)	(Team NSP–Ghost)
Jersey awarded to the youth classification winner	Youth	Tony Gallopin (FRA)	(RadioShack–Nissan)
	Team	Team Sky	

The 2012 Bayern Rundfahrt was the 33rd edition of the Bayern Rundfahrt, an annual cycling road race. Departing from Traunstein on 22 May, it concluded in Bamberg on 27 May. The 801.9 km long stage race was part of the 2012 UCI Europe Tour, and was rated as a 2.HC event. Michael Rogers of Team Sky was the eventual winner.

== Teams ==
19 teams were invited to participate in the tour: 9 UCI ProTeams, 5 UCI Professional Continental Teams and 5 UCI Continental Teams.

UCI ProTeams
- Team Saxo Bank
- RadioShack–Nissan
- Team Sky
- Euskaltel–Euskadi
- Lampre–ISD
- Team Katusha
- FDJ–BigMat
- Garmin–Barracuda
- Orica–GreenEDGE
UCI Professional Continental Teams
- Argos–Shimano
- Topsport Vlaanderen–Mercator
- Team Europcar
- Team NetApp
- Saur–Sojasun
UCI Continental Teams
- Eddy Merckx–Indeland
- Team Heizomat
- Nutrixxion–Abus
- Team NSP–Ghost
- Thüringer Energie Team

== Stages ==
=== Stage 1 ===
23 May 2012 – Traunstein to Penzberg, 215.7 km (134.0 mi)'

	Rider	Team	Time
1	Alessandro Petacchi (ITA)	Lampre–ISD	5h 29' 01"
2	Allan Davis (AUS)	Orica–GreenEDGE	st
3	Yauheni Hutarovich (BLR)	FDJ–BigMat	st
4	John Degenkolb (AUS)	Argos–Shimano	st
5	Alexander Porsev (RUS)	Team Katusha	st

=== Stage 2 ===
24 May 2012 – Penzberg to Kempten, 195.6 km (121.5 mi)'

	Rider	Team	Time
1	Michael Rogers (AUS)	Team Sky	4h 43' 48"
2	Vladimir Gusev (RUS)	Team Katusha	st
3	Jérôme Coppel (FRA)	Saur–Sojasun	st
4	Haimar Zubeldia (ESP)	RadioShack–Nissan	st
5	Kanstantsin Sivtsov (BLR)	Team Sky	st

=== Stage 3 ===
25 May 2012 – Kempten to Treuchtlingen, 196.4 km (122.0 mi)'

	Rider	Team	Time
1	Alessandro Petacchi (ITA)	Lampre–ISD	4h 54' 24"
2	Yauheni Hutarovich (BLR)	Team Katusha	st
3	John Degenkolb (GER)	Argos–Shimano	st
4	Michael Schweizer (GER)	Nutrixxion–Abus	st
5	Allan Davis (AUS)	Orica–GreenEDGE	st

=== Stage 4 ===
26 May 2012 – individual time trial (ITT) in Feuchtwangen, 26.4 km (16.4 mi)'

	Rider	Team	Time
1	Michael Rogers (AUS)	Team Sky	31' 15"
2	Richie Porte (AUS)	Team Sky	+ 4"
3	Jérôme Coppel (FRA)	Saur–Sojasun	+16"
4	Vladimir Gusev (RUS)	Team Katusha	+24"
5	Kanstantsin Sivtsov (BLR)	Team Sky	+35"

=== Stage 5 ===
27 May 2012 – Feuchtwangen to Bamberg, 167.8 km (104.3 mi)'

	Rider	Team	Time
1	Alessandro Petacchi (ITA)	Lampre–ISD	3hr 48' 06"
2	Allan Davis (AUS)	Orica–GreenEDGE	st
3	André Schulze (GER)	Team NetApp	st
4	Rafai Chtioui (TUN)	Team Europcar	st
5	Baden Cooke (AUS)	Orica–GreenEDGE	st

== Classification leadership ==
Stage	Winner	General classification	Points classification	Mountains classification	Young rider classification	Team classification
1	Alessandro Petacchi	Alessandro Petacchi	David Boucher	Steffen Radochla	Alexander Smith	Team Europcar
2	Michael Rogers	Michael Rogers	Michael Rogers	Steffen Radochla	Michael Blackman	Team Sky
3	Alessandro Petacchi	Michael Rogers	Alessandro Petacchi	Steffen Radochla	Michael Blackman	Team Sky
4	Michael Rogers	Michael Rogers	Alessandro Petacchi	Steffen Radochla	Tony Gallopin	Team Sky
5	Alessandro Petacchi	Michael Rogers	Alessandro Petacchi	Steffen Radochla	Tony Gallopin	Team Sky
Final		Michael Rogers	Alessandro Petacchi	Steffen Radochla	Tony Gallopin	Team Sky

=== General classification ===
	Rider	Team	Time
1	Michael Rogers (AUS)	Team Sky	19h 26' 20"
2	Jérôme Coppel (FRA)	Saur–Sojasun	+ 25"
3	Vladimir Gusev (RUS)	Team Katusha	+ 30"
4	Richie Porte (AUS)	Team Sky	+ 41"
5	Kanstantsin Sivtsov (BLR)	Team Sky	+ 47"
6	Tony Gallopin (FRA)	RadioShack–Nissan	+ 1' 13"
7	Christian Knees (GER)	Team Sky	+ 1' 17"
8	Joost Posthuma (NED)	RadioShack–Nissan	+ 5' 47"
9	Jérémy Roy (FRA)	FDJ–BigMat	+ 1' 30"
10	Haimar Zubeldia (ESP)	RadioShack–Nissan	+ 6' 43"
