= Jérôme Coppel =

French road bicycle racer

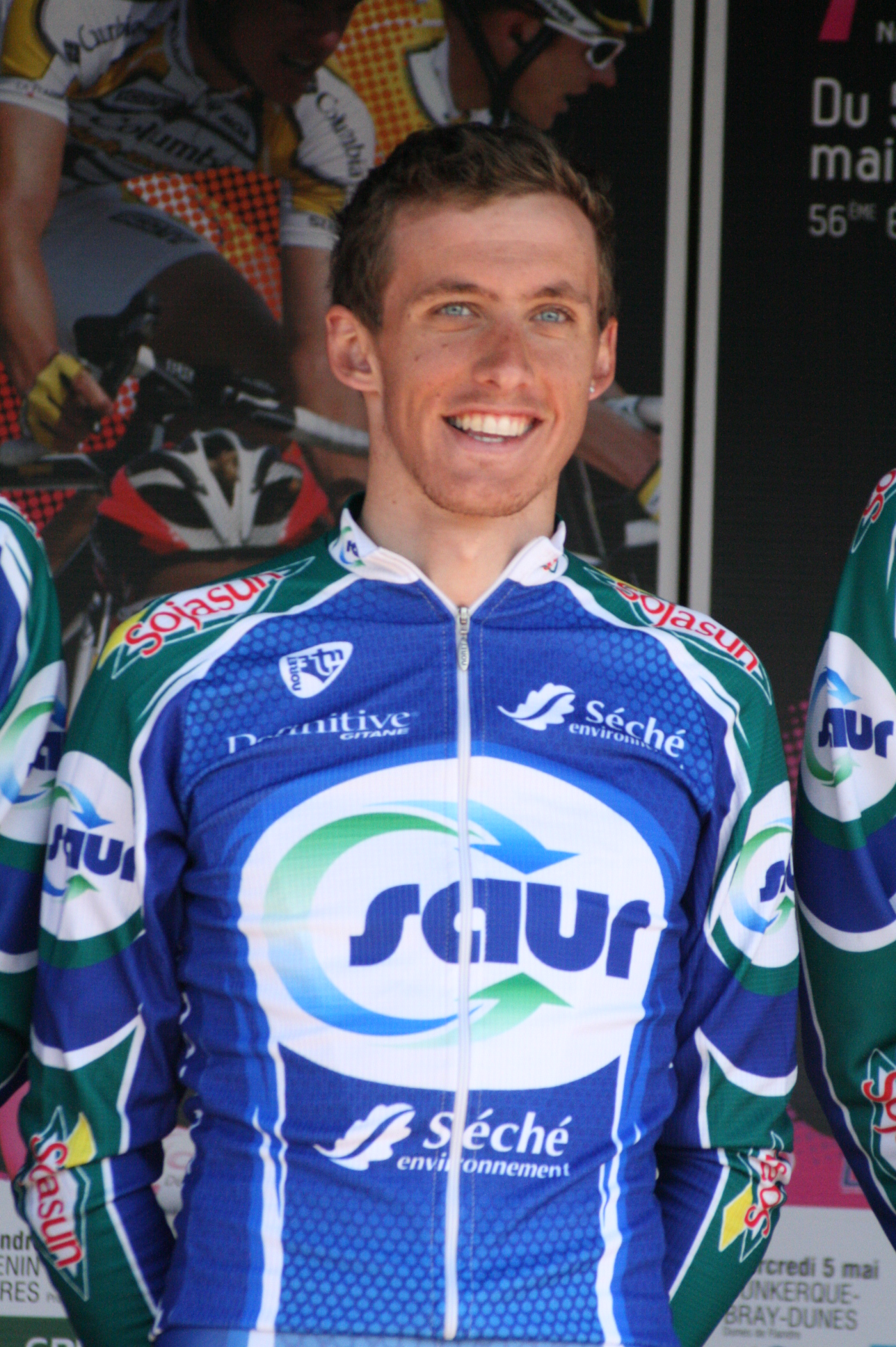
- Coppel at the 2010 Four Days of Dunkirk

Personal information
- Full name: Jérôme Coppel
- Born: 6 August 1986 (age 40) Annemasse, France
- Height: 1.78 m (5 ft 10 in)
- Weight: 64 kg (141 lb; 10.1 st)

Cycling career
- Sport: Cycling
- Current team: Retired
- Discipline: Road
- Role: Rider
- Rider type: All-rounder; Time trialist

Amateur team
- 2006–2007: CR4C Roanne

Professional teams
- 2008–2009: Française des Jeux
- 2010–2012: Saur–Sojasun
- 2013–2014: Cofidis
- 2015–2016: IAM Cycling

Major wins
- One-day races and Classics National Time Trial Championships (2015)
Medal record
Representing France
Men's road bicycle racing
World Championships
Bronze medal – third place	2006 Salzburg	U23 time trial
Bronze medal – third place	2007 Stuttgart	U23 time trial
Bronze medal – third place	2015 Richmond	Time trial

Jérôme Coppel (born 6 August 1986) is a French former road bicycle racer, who rode professionally between 2008 and 2016 for the Française des Jeux, Saur–Sojasun, Cofidis and IAM Cycling teams.

== Career ==
Born in Annemasse, Haute-Savoie, Coppel and compatriot Romain Sicard were the focus of a four-page spread in the sports magazine L'Équipe, with the headline Bientôt un crack français ? ("Soon a French champ?"). His presence helped Saur–Sojasun gain its invitation to the 2011 Tour de France, where he finished 14th in the general classification and third in the young rider classification.

Coppel left Saur–Sojasun at the end of the 2012 season, and joined Cofidis for the 2013 season. In December 2014 he was announced as part of the squad for the IAM Cycling team for 2015.

Coppel retired after the 2016 Tour de l'Ain.

== Major results ==
2004
1st Time trial, National Junior Road Championships
10th Time trial, UCI Junior Road World Championships
2005
2nd Time trial, National Under-23 Road Championships
2006
1st Time trial, National Under-23 Road Championships
1st Stage 3 Tour des Pays de Savoie
2nd Time trial, UEC European Under-23 Road Championships
3rd Time trial, UCI Under-23 Road World Championships
4th Overall Tour de Berlin
2007
National Under-23 Road Championships

1st Time trial
1st Road race

1st Overall Circuit des Ardennes

1st Young rider classification

3rd Time trial, UCI Under-23 Road World Championships
3rd Overall Grand Prix Guillaume Tell
5th Time trial, UEC European Under-23 Road Championships
5th Time trial, National Road Championships
7th Overall Thüringen Rundfahrt der U23
2008
4th Overall Tour de l'Avenir
6th Overall Tour de l'Ain
8th Tour du Finistère
2009
1st Route Adélie
4th Overall La Tropicale Amissa Bongo
5th Time trial, National Road Championships
6th Overall Critérium International
2010
1st Overall Tour du Gévaudan Languedoc-Roussillon

1st Stage 2

1st Overall Rhône-Alpes Isère Tour

1st Stage 1

1st Tour du Doubs
3rd Gran Premio de Llodio
4th Vuelta a La Rioja
5th Overall Critérium du Dauphiné
6th Overall Tour de l'Ain
6th Tour du Finistère
7th Giro dell'Emilia
9th Overall Paris–Nice
9th Les Boucles du Sud-Ardèche
10th Gran Premio Bruno Beghelli
2011
1st Overall Vuelta a Murcia

1st Stage 3 (ITT)

1st Young rider classification Critérium du Dauphiné
4th Overall Vuelta a Andalucía
5th Overall Vuelta a Castilla y León
5th Overall Étoile de Bessèges
9th Overall Tour du Poitou-Charentes
2012
1st Overall Étoile de Bessèges

1st Stage 5b (ITT)

1st Tour du Doubs
2nd Overall Bayern–Rundfahrt
3rd Overall Vuelta a Andalucía
5th Overall Tour de l'Ain
9th Overall Tour of Britain
2013
4th Time trial, National Road Championships
2014
2nd Overall Étoile de Bessèges
5th Time trial, National Road Championships
6th Overall Tour of Austria
Combativity award Stage 20 Vuelta a España
2015
1st Time trial, National Road Championships
3rd Time trial, UCI Road World Championships
2016
1st Overall Étoile de Bessèges

1st Stage 5 (ITT)

2nd Overall Circuit de la Sarthe
4th Time trial, National Road Championships
8th Classic Sud-Ardèche

=== Grand Tour general classification results timeline ===
Grand Tour	2009	2010	2011	2012	2013	2014	2015	2016
Giro d'Italia	Did not contest during career							
Tour de France	DNF	—	14	21	63	—	DNF	75
Vuelta a España	—	—	—	—	40	31	DNF	—

Legend
—	Did not compete
DNF	Did not finish
