= Michael Rogers (cyclist) =

Australian cyclist (born 1979)

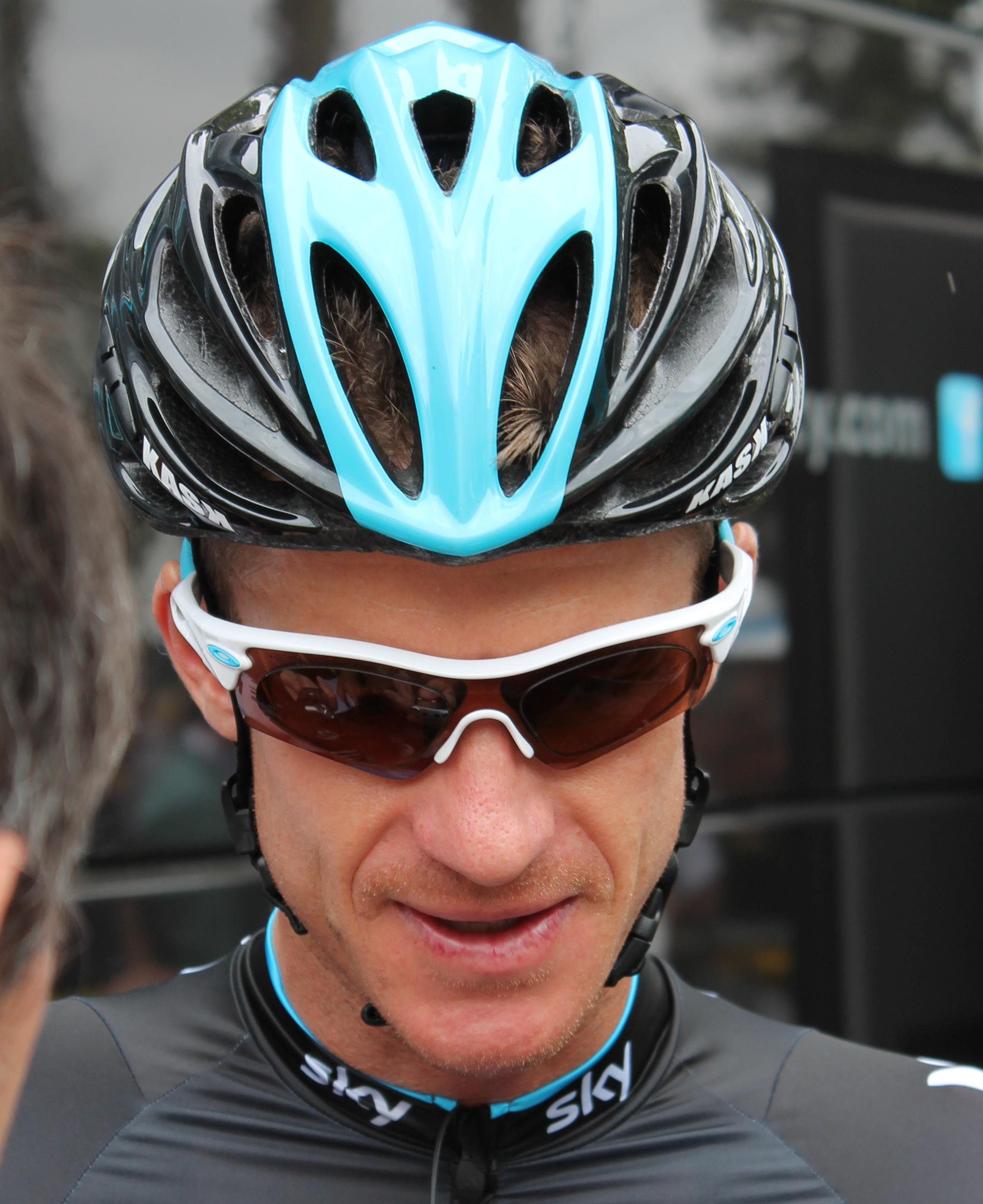
- Rogers at the 2012 Tour de France.

Personal information
- Full name: Michael Rogers
- Nicknames: Dodger, Mick
- Born: 20 December 1979 (age 46) Barham, New South Wales, Australia
- Height: 1.85 m (6 ft 1 in)
- Weight: 74 kg (163 lb; 11.7 st)

Cycling career
- Sport: Cycling
- Current team: Retired
- Discipline: Road
- Role: Rider
- Rider type: All-rounder

Amateur team
- 2000: Mapei–Quick-Step (stagiaire)

Professional teams
- 2001–2002: Mapei–Quick-Step
- 2003–2005: Quick-Step–Davitamon
- 2006–2010: T-Mobile Team
- 2011–2012: Team Sky
- 2013–2016: Saxo–Tinkoff

Major wins
- Grand Tours Tour de France 1 individual stage (2014) Giro d'Italia 2 individual stages (2014) 1 TTT stage (2009) Stage races Tour Down Under (2002) Tour of Belgium (2003) Deutschland Tour (2003) Tour of California (2010) Bayern Rundfahrt (2012) One-day races and Classics World Time Trial Championships (2003, 2004, 2005) National Time Trial Championships (2009)
Medal record
Representing Australia
Men's track cycling
Olympic Games
Bronze medal – third place	2004 Athens	Road time trial
Commonwealth Games
Gold medal – first place	1998 Kuala Lumpur	Team pursuit
Gold medal – first place	1998 Kuala Lumpur	Scratch race
Men's road bicycle racing
World Championships
Gold medal – first place	2003 Hamilton	Time trial
Gold medal – first place	2004 Verona	Time trial
Gold medal – first place	2005 Madrid	Time trial
Silver medal – second place	1997 San Sebastián	Junior time trial
Silver medal – second place	1999 Verona	Under-23 time trial
Bronze medal – third place	2000 Plouay	Under-23 time trial
Commonwealth Games
Silver medal – second place	2002 Manchester	Individual time trial

Michael Rogers (born 20 December 1979) is an Australian retired professional road bicycle racer who competed professionally between 1999 and 2016, for the Mapei–Quick-Step, Quick-Step–Innergetic, Team HTC–Columbia, Team Sky and Tinkoff teams. He is a three-time World Time Trial Champion, winning consecutively in 2003 (after David Millar was stripped for doping), 2004 and 2005, and won Grand Tour stages at the Tour de France and the Giro d'Italia.

In April 2016, Rogers announced via Twitter, that he was being forced to retire from professional cycling due to a congenital heart defect condition which had been worsening.

== Career ==
=== Early career ===
Rogers was part of the Australian Institute of Sport, which led him to move to Europe at age 16 as an amateur. He started as a track racer under coach Charlie Walsh.

At the 2002 Tour Down Under, Rogers' team-prepared bicycle was damaged in a collision with a motorcycle, forcing him to come to a halt by the roadside. The collision was not captured by television cameras. There were no team cars nearby and Rogers appeared visibly frustrated with the turn of events. Fortunately, spectator Adam Pyke, an amateur cyclist, offered his own Colnago bicycle as a replacement and Rogers was able to continue, needing only a minor saddle height adjustment en route from a mechanic alongside in a car. He went on to finish second on the stage, took the race lead, and ultimately went on to win the race overall. The entire episode, including swapping bicycles, was captured by the television cameras while Rogers, Pyke and the borrowed bicycle were reunited at the end of the stage by the Australian broadcaster Seven in a televised interview.

Rogers won the world time-trial championship in 2003, 2004 and 2005. He came second in 2003, but became champion after the winner, David Millar, was disqualified for doping. Rogers received his rainbow jersey and gold medal on the day of the 2004 championship, thereby receiving two gold medals on the same day.

In the 2003 Tour de France, Rogers helped Richard Virenque win his sixth mountains classification. He was the last rider left to help in Virenque's day-long escape and stage win.

Rogers finished fourth in the road time trial at the 2004 Olympics in Athens. In May 2011 US cyclist Tyler Hamilton returned his gold medal for this event after admitting to doping during his cycling career, and in August 2012 the International Olympic Committee formally stripped Hamilton of his victory, resulting in Rogers being awarded the bronze medal. In September 2015, he received the Olympic medal in a ceremony at the IOC headquarters in Lausanne, Switzerland.

=== T Mobile (2006–2010) ===
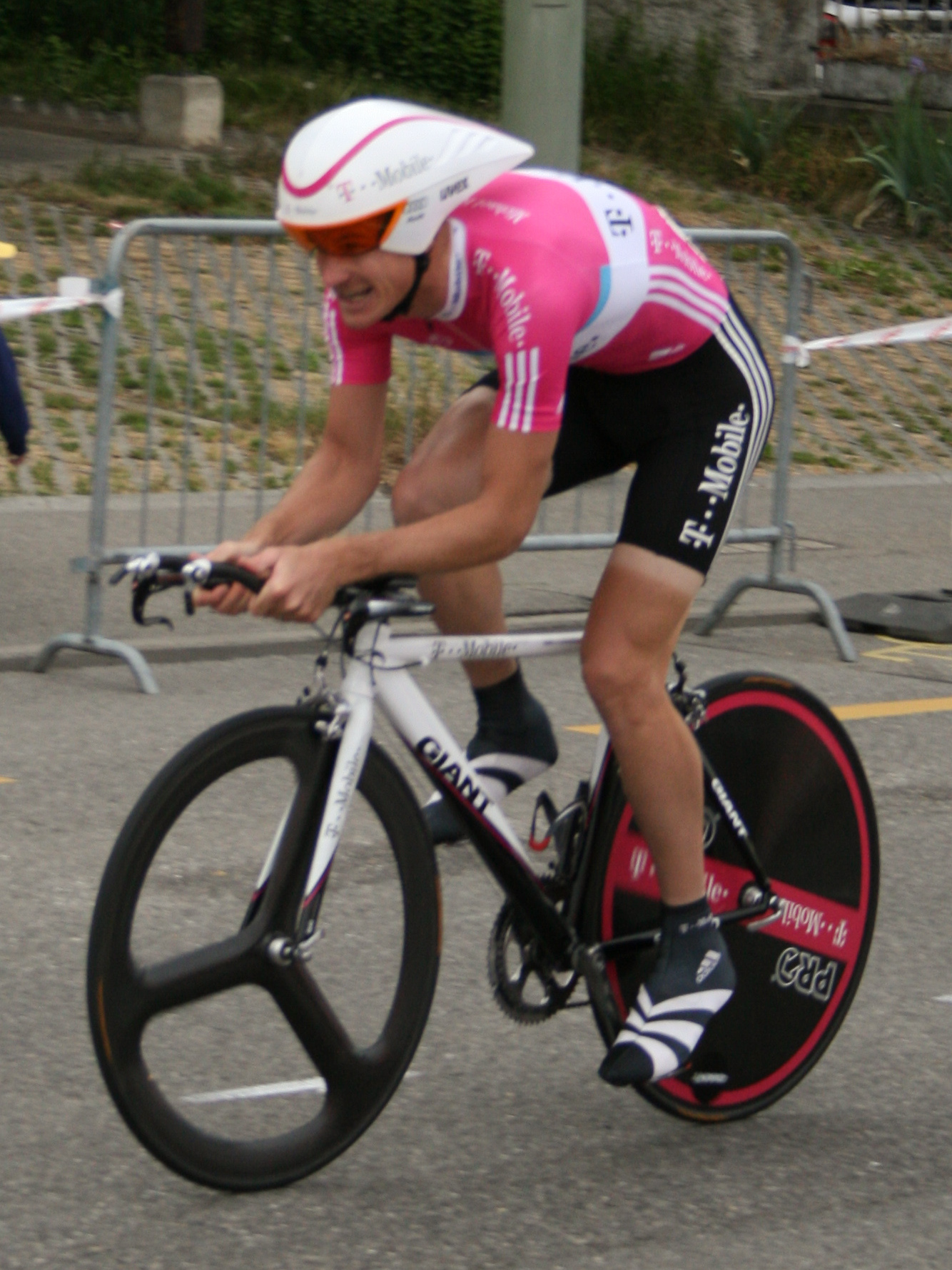
Rogers at the 2007 Tour de Romandie

Rogers joined T-Mobile Team for the 2006 season, and finished 9th overall in the Tour de France. In an interview during the 2006 season, Rogers disclosed that he had received training advice by Italian doctor Michele Ferrari for several months during 2006.

On 15 July 2007, Rogers withdrew on the 8th stage of the 2007 Tour de France after breaking a collarbone in a crash descending the Cormet de Roselend. He continued until the doctor arrived from attending fellow Australian Stuart O'Grady, who ended up stretchered to hospital. It was after this that Rogers contracted infectious mononucleosis (glandular fever), which caused a dip in his racing form for some time. By late 2009 he had returned to form and began to have significant racing success, with Team Columbia–High Road, the successor to T-Mobile.

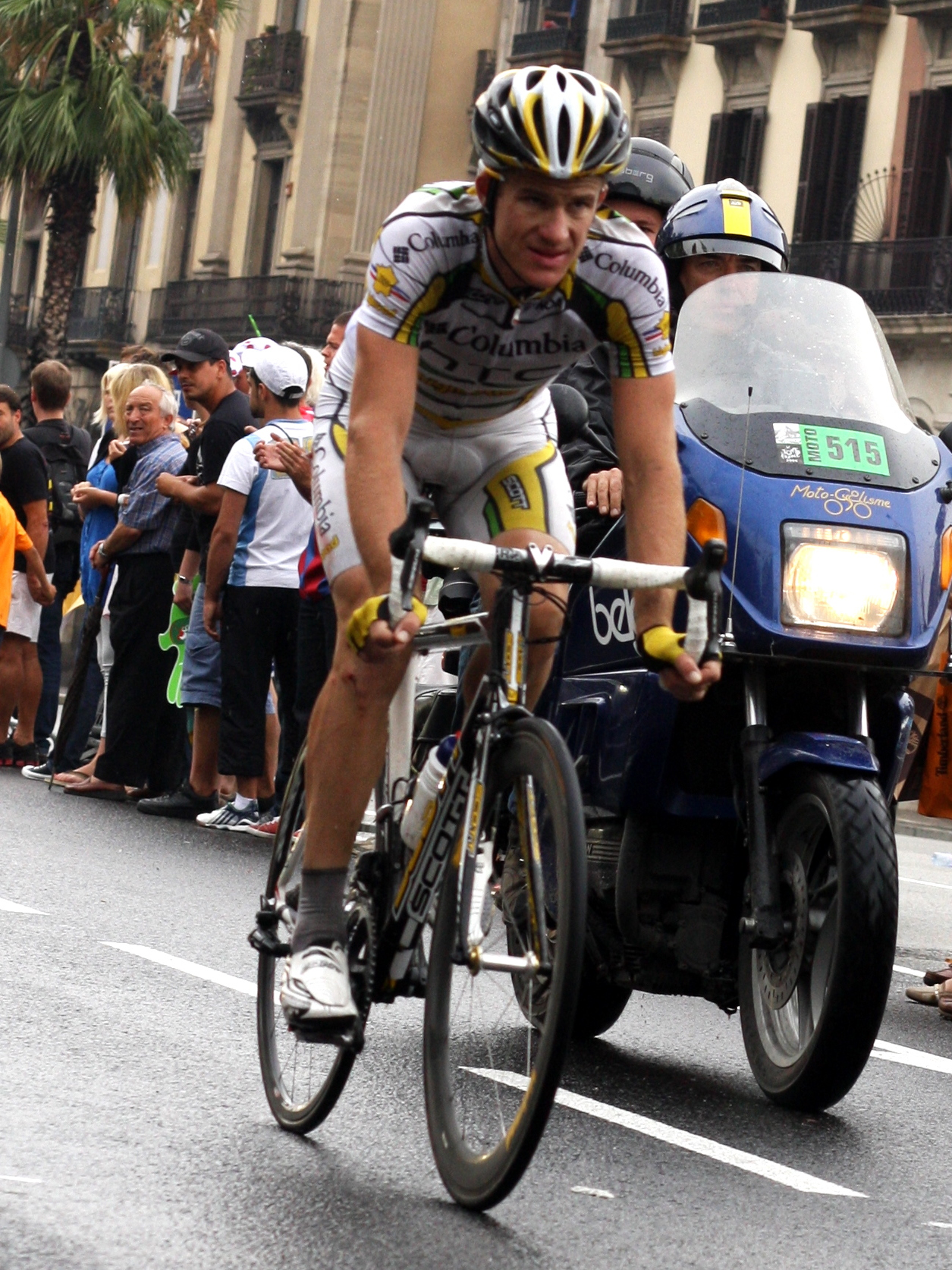
Rogers at the 2009 Tour de France

In 2010, as leader of his team, he won the Vuelta a Andalucía, and then the Tour of California (the first non-American to do so). After a disappointing Tour de France (37th overall), Rogers announced he would concentrate in future on shorter races (e.g. one week in length) as he was no longer suited to the longer tours.

=== Team Sky (2011–2012) ===
In October 2010 it was announced that he would leave Team HTC–Columbia and join British based Team Sky for the 2011 racing season. However he suffered a relapse of his mononucleosis early in the season and was unable to defend his 2010 Tour of California title. Rogers returned to fitness towards the end of the season.

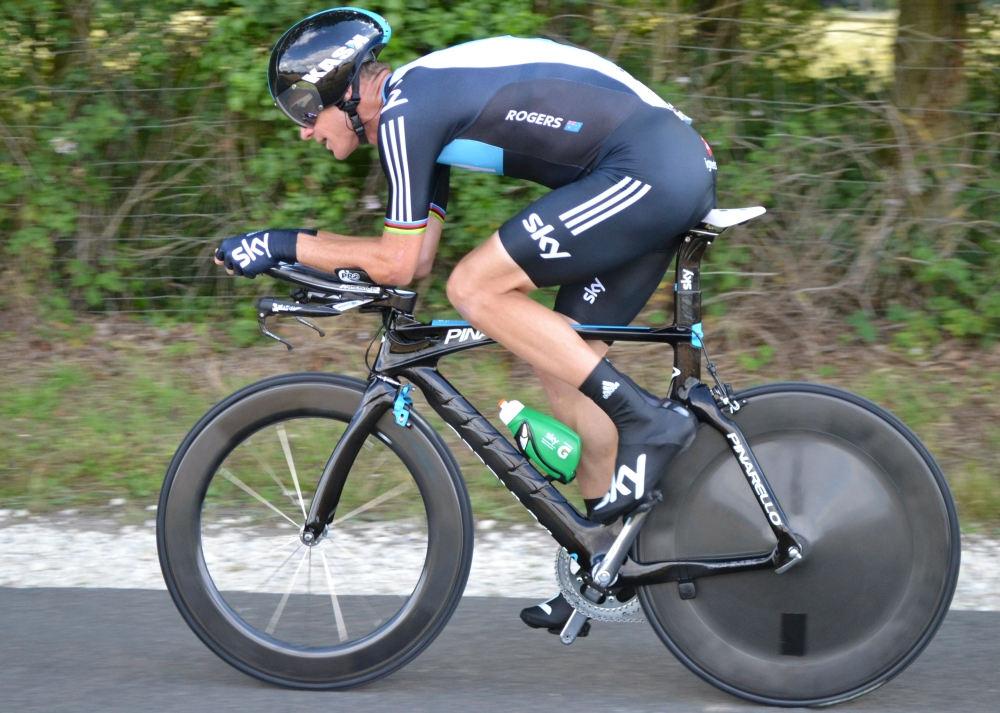
Rogers at the 2012 Tour de France

Rogers began the 2012 season with third place in the Australian National Time Trial Championships, and led Team Sky at the Tour Down Under, where he finished 4th in the general classification. In March, Rogers finished third at the Critérium International; he placed second to BMC Racing Team's Cadel Evans in the individual time trial around Porto-Vecchio, and finished eighth on the final stage, the summit finish of the Col de L'Ospedale. After finishing fifth in April's Tour de Romandie, Rogers won May's Bayern Rundfahrt stage race in Germany, winning Stage 2 and the time trial Stage 4 in the process, his first victories whilst riding for Team Sky. Rogers then rode the Critérium du Dauphiné, helping leader Bradley Wiggins win the race, whilst finishing second overall himself after a strong ride in the time trial. Rogers was selected in the Team Sky squad for the Tour de France, as one of Wiggins' key domestiques. He suffered a crash towards the end of Stage 1, but was able to make it back to the peloton. Rogers played a key team role in the rest of the race, setting the tempo on mountains and notably bringing back a long range attack by Cadel Evans on Stage 11, as Sky ultimately achieved a 1–2 finish in the GC with Wiggins and Chris Froome.

=== Team Saxo–Tinkoff (2013–2016) ===
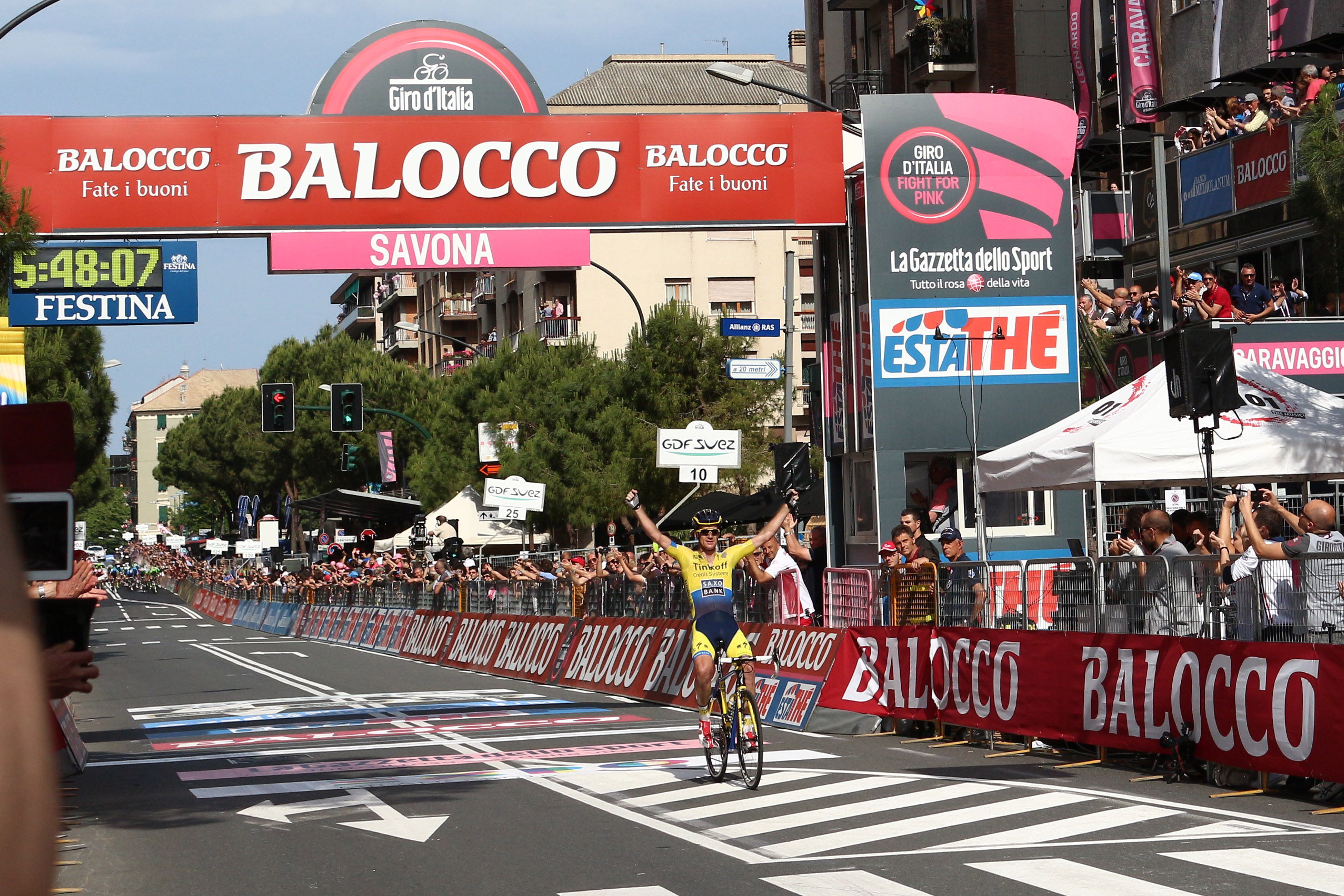
Rogers celebrating victory on stage 11 of Giro d'Italia 2014

Rogers left Sky to join Saxo–Tinkoff in 2012 following a new Sky policy requiring all riders to sign to confirm they have no history of doping although he denied leaving for that reason.

In May, Rogers was the runner-up to Tejay van Garderen in the Tour of California. In July Rogers rode the Tour de France in support of Alberto Contador and finished in 16th place. In October he won the Japan Cup one-day race. In December it was announced that he had tested positive for clenbuterol at the latter race, and was suspended from cycling pending further investigation. On 23 April 2014 the Union Cycliste Internationale (UCI) announced he would be cleared of any wrongdoing, no further action would be taken and that Rogers would be free to race again. The UCI accepted that there was a significant probability that the clenbuterol came from contaminated meat consumed while Rogers was competing in China, where the drug is often consumed by animals in slaughterhouses to exhibit better performance in farm sporting events.

He returned to racing just in time to ride the 2014 Giro d'Italia. Throughout much of the race, he rode in support of Rafał Majka. He won his first Grand Tour individual stage on the eleventh stage and also won the penultimate stage summit finish at the Monte Zoncolan. On 22 July 2014, Rogers won his first Tour de France stage, winning stage 16 of the race. The longest stage of the race, a 237.5-kilometre (147.6-mile) route from Carcassonne to Bagnères-de-Luchon, Rogers attacked Cyril Gautier at the bottom of the descent of the Port de Balès with 5 kilometres (3.1 miles) remaining to win in solo fashion.

=== Post-cycling career ===
After his active cycling career Rogers had been working as NTT Pro Cycling's technical partner manager, and, prior to that, he had been the founder and CEO of virtual-world training platform VirtuGO, which closed down in November 2019. Since November 2020 Rogers is employed by the UCI as its "innovation manager".

== Major results ==
=== Road ===
1996
1st Time trial, National Junior Championships
1997
2nd Time trial, UCI World Junior Championships
1999
2nd Time trial, UCI World Under-23 Championships
2000
1st Stage 2 Tour Down Under
3rd Time trial, UCI World Under-23 Championships
2001
2nd Grand Prix Eddy Merckx (with Fabian Cancellara)
2nd Duo Normand (with Fabian Cancellara)
4th Overall Redlands Bicycle Classic
4th Joseph Vögeli Memorial
6th Chrono des Herbiers
8th Firenze–Pistoia
9th Overall Circuit Franco-Belge
10th Circuito de Getxo
2002
1st Overall Tour Down Under

1st Stage 2

1st Overall Tour de Beauce
2nd Time trial, Commonwealth Games
2nd Time trial, National Championships
3rd Overall International Tour of Rhodes
5th Sparkassen Giro Bochum
5th Chrono des Herbiers
6th Poreč Trophy
8th Time trial, UCI World Championships
9th Grand Prix des Nations
2003
1st Time trial, UCI World Championships
1st Overall Deutschland Tour

1st Stage 6 (ITT)

1st Overall Route du Sud

1st Stage 3 (ITT)

1st Overall Tour of Belgium
2nd Time trial, National Championships
2nd Grand Prix Eddy Merckx (with László Bodrogi)
4th Overall Circuit de la Sarthe

1st Young rider classification

5th Overall Tour de Picardie
6th Grand Prix des Nations
9th LuK Challenge Chrono (with László Bodrogi)
2004
1st Time trial, UCI World Championships
2nd Firenze–Pistoia
3rd Time trial, Olympic Games
4th Grand Prix des Nations
6th Overall Tour de Luxembourg
7th Chrono des Herbiers
8th Overall Paris–Nice

1st Young rider classification

9th LuK Challenge Chrono (with Patrik Sinkewitz)
2005
1st Time trial, UCI World Championships
2nd Overall Tour de Suisse
2nd Chrono des Herbiers
3rd Gran Premio di Chiasso
4th Overall Volta a Catalunya
7th Overall Tour of Britain
8th Overall Tour of the Basque Country
8th Tour du Haut Var
8th LuK Challenge Chrono (with Patrik Sinkewitz)
9th Overall Settimana Internazionale di Coppi e Bartali
2006
2nd Overall Regio-Tour

1st Stage 3

4th LuK Challenge Chrono (with Serhiy Honchar)
5th Overall Tour of Britain
8th Time trial, UCI World Championships
8th Overall Circuit de la Sarthe
9th Overall Tour de France
2007
2nd Overall Volta a Catalunya
4th Overall Settimana Internazionale di Coppi e Bartali
4th Overall Regio-Tour
7th Overall Tour of California
2008
2nd Overall Tour of Missouri
2nd Overall Sachsen Tour
3rd Overall Eneco Tour
Olympic Games

5th Road race
8th Time trial

2009
National Championships

1st Time trial
2nd Road race

3rd Overall Tour of California
6th Overall Tour Down Under
6th Overall Giro d'Italia

1st Stage 1 (TTT)

8th Overall Tour of the Basque Country
2010
1st Overall Tour of California
1st Overall Vuelta a Andalucía
2nd Overall Critérium International
3rd Overall Tour de Romandie
3rd Montepaschi Strade Bianche
5th Time trial, UCI World Championships
6th Overall Tirreno–Adriatico
2012
1st Overall Bayern Rundfahrt

1st Stages 2 & 4 (ITT)

2nd Overall Critérium du Dauphiné
3rd Time trial, National Championships
3rd Overall Critérium International
4th Overall Tour Down Under
5th Overall Tour de Romandie
6th Time trial, Olympic Games
9th Overall Danmark Rundt
2013
~~1st Japan Cup~~
2nd Overall Tour of California
6th Overall Critérium du Dauphiné
2014
Giro d'Italia

1st Stages 11 & 20

1st Stage 16 Tour de France
3rd Overall Route du Sud
2015
7th Overall Eneco Tour

==== General classification results timeline ====
Grand Tour general classification results
Grand Tour	2003	2004	2005	2006	2007	2008	2009	2010	2011	2012	2013	2014	2015
Giro d'Italia	—	—	—	DNF	—	—	6	—	—	—	—	18	33
Tour de France	42	22	41	9	DNF	—	101	36	—	23	16	26	36
/ Vuelta a España	Did not contest during his career												
Major stage race general classification results
Race	2003	2004	2005	2006	2007	2008	2009	2010	2011	2012	2013	2014	2015
Paris–Nice	—	8	DNF	—	—	—	—	—	12	—	—	—	—
/ Tirreno–Adriatico	71	—	—	—	—	—	—	6	—	—	DNF	—	—
Volta a Catalunya	—	—	4	—	2	90	—	—	—	—	—	—	DNF
Tour of the Basque Country	—	80	8	—	DNF	—	8	73	111	21	DNF	—	—
Tour de Romandie	—	—	—	—	DNF	—	—	3	—	5	—	—	—
Critérium du Dauphiné	—	41	—	—	—	11	—	—	—	2	6	—	—
Tour de Suisse	—	—	2	64	DNF	—	—	DNF	—	—	—	—	—

Legend
—	Did not compete
DNF	Did not finish

=== Track ===
1997
UCI World Junior Championships

1st Team pursuit
1st Points race

1998
1st Scratch, Commonwealth Games
1st Individual pursuit, National Championships

Sporting positions
Preceded by Santiago Botero	World Time Trial Champion; 2003–2005	Succeeded by Fabian Cancellara
