= Michal Hrazdíra =

Czech cyclist

Personal information
- Born: 6 November 1977 (age 48) Brno, Czechoslovakia
- Height: 1.79 m (5 ft 10 in)
- Weight: 72 kg (159 lb)

Sport
- Sport: Cycling
- Club: Dukla Brno

Michal Hrazdíra (born 6 November 1977) is a retired Czech cyclist. He competed at the 2004 Summer Olympics in the individual time trial and in the road race and finished in 14th place in the former event.

His father Miloš (1945–1990) and elder brother Milan (born 1973) were also competitive cyclists.
