= Jeroen =

- Pronunciation: Dutch: [jəˈrun]
- Gender: Masculine
- Language: Dutch

Origin
- Language: Dutch

Other names
- Derived: Hieronymus

Jeroen (Dutch pronunciation: [jəˈrun]) is a Dutch male given name originating from the Greek Hieronymus, and is equivalent to the English name Jerome. In the Netherlands, there are around 52,000 people who are named Jeroen, while in Belgium there are around 11,000 people of that name.

== People named Jeroen ==
People with the given name Jeroen include:

- Jeroen Huijsen (born 1975), Dutch Engineer
- Jeroen Appeltans (born 1990), Dutch footballer
- Jeroen C. J. M. van den Bergh, Dutch economist
- Jeroen Bijl (born 1966), Dutch volleyball player
- Jeroen Bleekemolen (born 1981), Dutch racing driver
- Jeroen Blijlevens (born 1971), Dutch cyclist
- Jeroen Boere (1967–2007), Dutch footballer
- Jeroen van der Boom (born 1972), Dutch singer
- Jeroen Brand (born 1982), Dutch cricketer
- Jeroen van den Brink (born 1968), Dutch physicist
- Jeroen Brouwers (1940–2022), Dutch writer
- Jeroen van Damme (born 1972), Dutch runner
- Jeroen Delmee (born 1973), Dutch field hockey player
- Jeroen Devroe (born 1969), Belgian dressage rider
- Jeroen Dewulf (born 1972), Belgian cultural scientist
- Jeroen D'hoedt (born 1990), Belgian runner
- Jeroen van Dijk (born 1971), Dutch badminton player
- Jeroen Dijsselbloem (born 1966), Dutch politician
- Jeroen van Dillewijn, Dutch curler
- Jeroen Drost (born 1987), Dutch footballer
- Jeroen Dubbeldam (born 1973), Dutch equestrian
- Jeroen Duyster (born 1966), Dutch rower
- Jeroen Eisinga (born 1966), Dutch video artist
- Jeroen Elshoff (born 1977), Dutch sports journalist
- Jeroen Fischer (born 1966), Belgian sprinter and long jumper
- Jeroen Gies (born 1995), German-Dutch footballer
- Jeroen Groenendijk (1949–2023), Dutch philosopher
- Jeroen Henneman (born 1942), Dutch sculptor
- Jeroen Hertzberger (born 1986), Dutch field hockey player
- Jeroen Heubach (born 1974), Dutch footballer
- Jeroen Hoencamp (born 1966), Dutch businessman
- Jeroen Houwen (born 1996), Dutch footballer
- Jeroen van den Hoven (born 1957), Dutch philosopher
- Jeroen Jongeleen (born 1967), Dutch visual artist
- Jeroen Kampschreur (born 1999), Dutch para-skier
- Jeroen Kerstens, know by the stage name The Him, Dutch DJ and music producer
- Jeroen Ketting (born 1980), Dutch footballer
- Jeroen Kijk in de Vegte (born 1974), Dutch radio/TV presenter
- Jeroen van Koningsbrugge (born 1973), Dutch comedian and actor
- Jeroen Krabbé (born 1944), Dutch actor
- Jeroen Kramer (born 1967), Dutch photographer
- Jeroen Krupa (born 2003), German footballer
- Jeroen Lambers (born 1980), Dutch footballer
- Jeroen de Lange (born 1968), Dutch politician
- Jeroen van der Lely (born 1996), Dutch footballer
- Jeroen Lenaers (born 1984), Dutch politician
- Jeroen van der List (born 1989), Dutch basketball player
- Jeroen Lumu (born 1995), Dutch footballer
- Jeroen Masson (born 1981), Belgian tennis player
- Jeroen Meijers (born 1993), Dutch cyclist
- Jeroen Mettes (1978–2006), Dutch poet
- Jeroen Mooren (born 1985), Dutch judoka
- Jeroen Oerlemans (1970–2016), Dutch photographer and journalist
- Jeroen Olyslaegers (1967), Belgian writer
- Jeroen Paul Thesseling (born 1971), Dutch bass player
- Jeroen Pauw (born 1960), Dutch TV presenter
- Jeroen Phaff (born 1965), Dutch musical singer
- Jeroen Piket (born 1969), Dutch chess grandmaster
- Jeroen Rauwerdink (born 1985), Dutch volleyball player
- Jeroen Recourt (born 1970), Dutch politician
- Jeroen Rijsdijk (born 1977), Dutch footballer and coach
- Jeroen Simaeys (born 1985), Belgian footballer
- Jeroen Slaghekke (born 1992), Dutch racing driver
- Jeroen Sluijter (born 1975) Dutch baseball player
- Jeroen Smits (born 1972), Dutch cricketer
- Jeroen Soete (born 1983), Belgian politician
- Jeroen Spaans (born 1973), Dutch rower
- Jeroen Speak (born 1969), New Zealand-British composer
- Jeroen Spitzenberger (born 1976), Dutch actor
- Jeroen Stekelenburg (born 1974), Dutch sport commentator
- Jeroen Straathof (born 1972), Dutch cyclist and speed skater
- Jeroen Tas (born 1959), Dutch entrepreneur
- Jeroen Tel (born 1972), Dutch composer
- Jeroen Tesselaar (born 1989), Dutch footballer
- Jeroen Paul Thesseling (born 1971), Dutch bassist and composer
- Jeroen Trommel (born 1980), Dutch volleyball player
- Jeroen Van den Bogaert (born 1979), Belgian skier
- Jeroen Van Den Broeck (1989–2017), Belgian footballer
- Jeroen Vangeneugden (born 2001), Belgian solver expert
- Jeroen Van Herzeele (born 1965), Belgian jazz saxophonist
- Jeroen Vanthournout (born 1989), Belgian footballer
- Jeroen van Veen (pianist) (born 1969), Dutch pianist and composer
- Jeroen van der Veer (born 1947), Dutch businessman
- Jeroen Veldmate (born 1988), Dutch footballer
- Jeroen Verhoeven (born 1980), Dutch footballer
- Jeroen Verkennis (born 1998), Dutch footballer
- Jeroen Vervoort (born 1956), Dutch rower
- Jeroen de Vries (born 1971), Dutch speed skater
- Jeroen Weimar (born 1968/1969), Dutch-British-Australian public servant
- Jeroen van de Weijer (born 1965), Dutch linguist
- Jeroen van Wetten (born 1980), Dutch footballer
- Jeroen Wiedenhof (born 1959), Dutch linguist
- Jeroen van Wijngaarden (born 1978), Dutch politician
- Jeroen Willems (1962–2012), Dutch actor
- Jeroen Zoet (born 1991), Dutch footballer
- Jeroen Zweerts (born 1945), Dutch hockey player
