= Jerónimo =

Jerónimo (European Portuguese and Spanish) or Jerônimo (Brazilian Portuguese) may refer to:

- Jerónimo (name), a given or surname, Jerome in English
  - Jeronimo (singer) (born 1990), Dutch pop singer and actor
  - Jerônimo, a Brazilian indigenous politician
- A variant spelling of Geronimo, Apache leader
- Jeronimo (band), German band of the 1970s
- Jeronimo: The Untold Tale of Koreans in Cuba, a documentary film about Jeronimo Lim Kim
- Jeronimo, a fictional town in Paul Theroux's 1981 novel The Mosquito Coast and the 1986 feature film it inspired.
- A character in The Baroque Cycle by Neal Stephenson

== See also ==
- San Jerónimo (disambiguation)
- Jerome (disambiguation)
- Saint Jerome (disambiguation)
- Geronimo (disambiguation)
- San Geronimo (disambiguation)
- Geronimus (disambiguation)
- Hieronymus (disambiguation)
