= Girolamo =

Girolamo may refer to:

- Girolamo (given name)
- Girolamo (surname)

== See also ==
- San Girolamo (disambiguation)
