= Geronimo (name) =

Geronimo or Gerónimo is a masculine given name, the Italian and Spanish form of Jerome. Jerónimo is an alternative Spanish spelling of Gerónimo. It is also a surname.

People with the name include:

== Given name ==
- Geronimo (1829–1909), Chiricahua Apache leader who fought the United States
- Gerônimo (footballer) (born 1989), Brazilian footballer
- Geronimo (martyr) (1534–1569), Arab Christian martyr
- Gerónimo de Aguilar (1489–1531), Franciscan friar involved in the Spanish conquest of the Aztec Empire
- Geronimo Albertini, Catholic prelate and Bishop of Avellino e Frigento (1545–1548)
- Geronimo Allison (born 1994), American football player
- Gerónimo Barbadillo (born 1954), Peruvian retired footballer
- Gerónimo Beato (born 1995), Uruguayan footballer
- Gerónimo Berroa (born 1965), retired Major League Baseball player
- Geronimo de Bobadilla (1630–1709), Spanish painter
- Gerónimo Bortagaray (born 2000), Uruguayan footballer
- Gerónimo Boscana, (1776–1831) Spanish Franciscan missionary
- Geronimo Bruni (before 1660–after 1670), Italian painter
- Gerónimo Cafferata Marazzi (1929–1986), Peruvian Navy officer and government minister
- Gerónimo Castillón y Salas (1756–1835), Spanish bishop and last Grand Inquisitor of Spain
- Geronimo Cristobal (born 1986), Filipino writer
- Geronimo Cruz (1937–2022), Filipino basketball player
- Gerónimo del Campo (1902–1967), Spanish footballer
- Gerónimo de la Concepción (1642–1698), Spanish Carmelite and writer
- Geronimo B. de los Reyes Jr. (1936–2020), Filipino entrepreneur, philanthropist, and art collector
- Gerónimo Delgadillo (1900–1960), Mexican fencer
- Geronimo Dyogi (1949–2016), Filipino judoka
- Gerónimo Antonio de Ezquerra (c. 1660–1733), Spanish painter
- Geronimo Gerardi (1595–1648), Flemish artist
- Gerónimo Gil (born 1975), retired Major League Baseball player
- Gerónimo Giménez (1854–1923), Spanish conductor and composer
- Geronimo Goeloe (born 1981), Aruban sprinter
- Gerónimo de Mendieta (1525–1604), Spanish Franciscan missionary and historian
- Geronimo Mercuriali (1530–1606), Italian philologist and physician
- Geronimo Meynier (born 1941), Italian retired film actor
- Gerónimo Ovelar (born 1951), Paraguayan footballer of the 1970s and '80s
- Gerónimo Peña (born 1967), retired Major League Baseball player
- Geronimo Peñalosa (born 1972), Filipino boxer
- Gerónimo Poblete (born 1993), Argentine footballer
- Geronimo Pratt (1947–2011), high-ranking member of the Black Panther Party
- Gerónimo Prisciantelli (born 1999), Argentine rugby union player
- Gerónimo Ramírez, mid-17th century Spanish painter
- Gerónimo Rivera (born 2003), Argentine footballer
- Gerónimo Rulli (born 1992), Argentine footballer
- Gerónimo Saccardi (1949–2002), Argentine footballer and manager
- Geronimo Saccheri (1667–1733), Italian mathematician
- Gerónimo Salguero (1774—1847), Argentine statesman and lawyer
- Gerónimo Vargas Aignasse (born 1970), Argentine politician
- Geronimo Villanueva (born 1978), Argentine-American planetary astronomer
- Geronimo Ybarra, 19th-century American politician

== Surname ==
- César Gerónimo (born 1948), Dominican Major League Baseball player
- Clint Geronimo, Filipino politician
- Licerio Gerónimo (1855–1924), Filipino general
- Sarah Geronimo (born 1988), Filipina actress
- Vladimir Gerónimo (born 1978), Angolan basketball player

== See also ==
- Geronimus (disambiguation), a list of people with the surname
- Hieronymus (disambiguation), a related Latin given name
- Jerome (disambiguation)
