= Hieronymus =

Origin
- Origin: Greek
- Meaning: Sacred name

Other names
- Related names: Geronimo, Girolamo, Jerónimo

Hieronymus, in English pronounced /haɪˈrɒnɪməs/ or /həˈrɒnɪməs/, is the Latin form of the Ancient Greek name Ἱερώνυμος (Hierṓnymos), meaning 'with a sacred name'. It corresponds to the English given name Jerome.

== Variants ==
- Albanian: Jeronimi
- Arabic: جيروم (Jerome)
- Armenian: Հիերոնիմոս (Hieronimos)
- Basque: Jeronimo
- Belarusian: Еранім (Yeranim)
- Bulgarian: Йероним (Yeronim)
- Catalan: Jeroni
- Written Chinese: 希罗尼穆斯
  - Chinese Pinyin: xī luó ní mù sī
- Croatian: Jeronim
- Czech: Jeroným, Jeronýmus (archaic)
- Danish: Hieronymus
- Dutch: Hiëronymus, Jeroen
- English: Jerome, Hieronymus, Geromy, Rhonemus, Geronimo
- Esperanto: Hieronimo
- Estonian: Hieronymus
- Finnish: Hieronymus
- Flemish: Jerom
- French: Jérôme, Gérôme
- Galician Xerome
- German: Hieronymus
- Ancient Greek: Ἱερώνυμος (Hierṓnymos)
- Modern Greek: Ιερώνυμος (Ierónymos)
- Hebrew: הירונימוס (Hieronymus)
- Hungarian: Jeromos
- Indonesian: Hieronimus
- Interlingua: Jeronimo
- Italian: Girolamo, Gerolamo, Geronimo, Geromino
- Japanese: ヒエロニムス (Hieronimusu)
- Korean: 히에로니무스 (Hieronimuseu), 제롬 (Jerom)
- Latin: Hieronymus
- Lithuanian: Jeronimas
- Malayalam: ജെറോം
- Norwegian: Hieronymus
- Polish: Hieronim
- Portuguese: Jerónimo, Brazilian Jerônimo, or Jeronymo as an Azorian family name
- Romanian: Ieronim
- Russian: Иероним (Iyeronim)
- Sardinian: Ziròminu
- Dutch Low Saxon: Hiëronymus
- Serbian: Јероним (Jeronim)
- Slovak: Hieronym
- Spanish: Jerónimo
- Swahili: Jeromu
- Swedish: Hieronymus
- Tagalog: Jeronimo, Geronimo
- Thai: เจอโรม (Čhoerom), เยโรม (Yoerom; a historical distorted interpretation of the name)
- Ukrainian: Єронім (Yeronim), Єроним (Yeronym), Ієронім (Iyeronim)
- Vietnamese: Giêrônimô

== People with the name ==
=== As a given name ===
- Eusebius Sophronius Hieronymus, better known as Saint Jerome (c. 347 – 420)
- Hiëronymus Emiliani, better known as St. Jerome Emiliani (1486–1537)
- Hieronymus of Cardia, Greek general and historian
- Hieronymus of Rhodes, Greek peripatetic philosopher of the 3rd century BC
- Hieronymus of Syracuse, Greek tyrant
- Archbishop Ieronymos II of Athens
- Hieronymus, son of Charles Martel
- Hieronymus (bishop of Wrocław), early medieval Bishop of Wrocław, Poland from 1046 to 1062
- Hieronymus Bock, German botanist
- Hieronymus Bosch, Dutch artist
- Hieronymus Cardanus, also known as Girolamo Cardano or Jérôme Cardan, polymath, astrologer, gambler
- Hieronymus Cock, Flemish painter and etcher
- Hieronymus Fabricius, Italian anatomist
- Hieronymus Graf von Colloredo, Austrian Prince-Archbishop of Salzburg, Count of the Holy Roman Empire
- Hieronymus Lotter (1497–1580), merchant, construction manager and several times mayor of Leipzig, Germany
- Hieronymus Karl Friedrich von Münchhausen, famous recounter of tall tales, fictionalized as Baron Munchausen (1720–1797)
- Hieronymus Praetorius, German Composer
- Hieronymus Theodor Richter, German chemist
- Marcus Hieronymus Vida, 16th-century Italian poet and bishop
- Hieronymus Vietor (c. 1480–1546/47), printer in Vienna and Kraków
- Hieronymus Wierix, Flemish engraver
- Hieronymus Wolf, German historian
- Hieronymus Georg Zeuthen, Danish mathematician
- Hieronymus, pen name of Athalia Schwartz (1821-1871), Danish writer

=== As a surname ===
- Georg Hans Emmo Wolfgang Hieronymus, German botanist
- Otto Hieronimus, German engineer
- Holger Hieronymus, German former football player

=== Fictional characters ===
- Detective Hieronymus "Harry" Bosch, a fictional character
- Charlie Hieronymus Pace, a character from the television series Lost
- Hieronymus Frosch, a character (frog and inventor) created by Andreas H. Schmachtl

== See also ==
- Hieronymus machine, a pseudoscientific device
- Geronimus (disambiguation)
- Geronimo (disambiguation)
- Jerónimo (disambiguation)
- Jerome (disambiguation)
- Saint Jerome (disambiguation)
- San Geronimo (disambiguation)
- San Jerónimo (disambiguation)
- Hieronymi, a surname
