= J. Geronimus =

J. Geronimus may refer to:

- Yakov Lazarevich Geronimus (1898-1984), a Russian mathematician known for contributions to theoretical mechanics and the study of orthogonal polynomials
- Yuri Veniaminovich Geronimus, a Russian mathematician, who worked on the book Gradshteyn and Ryzhik in the 1960s and early 1970s

== See also ==
- Geronimus (disambiguation)
