= Jerome (disambiguation) =

Jerome (c.347–420) was a priest, confessor, theologian and historian from Dalmatia.

Jerome may also refer to:

== People ==
=== Given name ===
- Jerome (given name), a masculine name of Greek origin, with a list of people so named
- Saint Jerome (disambiguation), several saints and other topics named for them
- Jerome of Moravia, a 13th century Scottish friar and music theorist
- Jerome of Sandy Cove, an unidentified man discovered on the beach of Sandy Cove, Nova Scotia, on September 8, 1863

=== Surname ===
- Cameron Jerome (born 1986), English footballer
- Chauncey Jerome (1793–1868), American clockmaker and politician
- David Jerome (1829–1896), governor of Michigan
- Diane Jerome (born 1941), American sprint canoeist
- Harry Jerome (1940–1982), Canadian track and field runner
- James Jerome (1933–2005), Canadian judge and politician
- Jennie Jerome, Lady Randolph Churchill (1854–1921), mother of UK Prime Minister Winston Churchill
- Jerome K. Jerome (1859–1927), British author
- Jerry Jerome (boxer) (1874–1943), Australian boxer
- Jerry Jerome (saxophonist) (1912–2001), American musician
- Leonard Jerome (1817–1891), American financier
- Randolph Jerome (born 1978), Guyanese soccer player
- Stephanie Jerome, American politician
- Ty Jerome (born 1997), American basketball player
- William Jerome (1865–1932), American songwriter
- William Travers Jerome (1859–1934), New York lawyer

== Places ==
=== United States ===
- Jerome, Arizona
  - Jerome Historic District, a historic copper mining district
  - Jerome Grand Hotel, a historic hotel
  - Jerome State Historic Park
- Jerome, Arkansas, a town in Drew County
  - The Jerome War Relocation Center, a Japanese American internment camp
- Jerome, Florida, an unincorporated community in Collier County
- Jerome County, Idaho
  - Jerome, Idaho, a city in Jerome County
- Jerome, Illinois, a village in Sangamon County
- Jerome, Indiana, an unincorporated community in Howard County
- Jerome, Iowa, an unincorporated community in Appanoose County
- Jerome, Michigan, an unincorporated community in Hillsdale County
- Jerome Township, Michigan, a civil township in Midland County
- Jerome, Missouri, an unincorporated community in Phelps County
- Jerome Township, Union County, Ohio
  - Jerome, Ohio, an unincorporated community in Union County
- Jerome, Pennsylvania, a census-designated place in Somerset County
- Jerome, West Virginia, an uninhabited community in Morgan County
- Jerome Avenue, a thoroughfare in the Bronx, New York
- Jerome Street Bridge in McKeesport, Pennsylvania

=== Canada ===
- Lac-Jérôme, Quebec, an unorganized territory in the Côte-Nord region

== Arts ==
- Jerome (Family Guy), a character in the animated comedy series
- "Jerome", a song by Lykke Li from Wounded Rhymes, 2011
- "Jerome", a song by Zella Day from Kicker, 2015
- "Jerome", a song by Atmosphere from Mi Vida Local, 2018
- "Jerome", a song by Lizzo from Cuz I Love You, 2019

== Other uses ==
- 1414 Jérôme, a main belt asteroid
- Dublin Jerome High School, a public high school in Dublin, Ohio, USA
- Jerome Biblical Commentary, a 1968 two-volume book of Biblical scholarship and commentary
- Jerome High School (Jerome, Idaho), an American public secondary school
- Jerome Park Racetrack, a thoroughbred horse racing facility in New York
- Jerome Park Reservoir, part of the metropolitan New York City water supply system
- Pseudo-Jerome, the name given to several authors misidentified as, or claiming to be, Saint Jerome

== See also ==
- Jean Jérôme (disambiguation)
- Jérôme Bonaparte (disambiguation)
- Gerome (disambiguation)
- Geronimus (disambiguation)
- Geronimo (disambiguation)
- Girolamo (disambiguation)
- Hieronymus (disambiguation)
- Jeremy (disambiguation)
- Jeroen (disambiguation)
- Jerónimo (disambiguation)
- Jerry (given name)
