= Geronimus =

Geronimus may refer to:

- Arline Geronimus, American public health researcher
- Yakov Lazarevich Geronimus (1898–1984), a Russian mathematician known for contributions to theoretical mechanics and the study of orthogonal polynomials
- Yuri Veniaminovich Geronimus (Юрий Венеаминович Геронимус) (1923–2013), a Russian mathematician, who worked on the book Gradshteyn and Ryzhik in the 1960s and early 1970s

== See also ==
- Geronimo (disambiguation)
- Hieronymus (disambiguation)
- Jerome (disambiguation)
- Jerónimo (disambiguation)
- Saint Jerome (disambiguation)
- San Geronimo (disambiguation)
- San Jerónimo (disambiguation)
