= Ben Parkinson =

Ben Parkinson may refer to:

- Ben Parkinson (British soldier) (born 1984), English paratrooper, veterans' campaigner and author
- Ben Parkinson (footballer) (born 2005), English footballer
