= Jarome =

Jarome is a given name. Notable people with the name include:

- Jarome Iginla (born 1977), Canadian ice hockey winger
- Jarome Luai (born 1997), Samoan international rugby league footballer

== See also ==
- Jahrome, given name
- Jerome (disambiguation)
