= Gerolamo =

Gerolamo is a given name. Notable people with the name include:

- Gerolamo Cardano (1501–1576), Italian Renaissance mathematician, physician, astrologer and gambler
- Gerolamo Emiliani (1486–1537), Italian humanitarian, founder of the Somaschi Fathers, and saint
- Gerolamo Giovenone (1486–1555), Italian painter of the early Renaissance period mainly in Milan
- Gerolamo Marquese d' Andrea (1812–1868), Italian Cardinal
- Gerolamo Olgiati (1453–1477), government official in Milan and assassin of Galeazzo Maria Sforza, the Duke of Milan
- Gerolamo Quaglia (born 1902), Italian wrestler and Olympic medalist in Greco-Roman wrestling
- Gerolamo Sersale (1584–1654), Italian Jesuit astronomer and selenographer
- Gerolamo Theodoli (1677–1766), Italian nobleman and architect, best known for designing the Teatro Argentina in Rome

== See also ==
- Girolamo (given name)
