= Monastery of St. Jerome =

Monastery of St. Jerome may refer to:

in Portugal

- Monastery of St Jerome, Lisbon

in Spain

- Monastery of Saint Jerome (Granada)

== See also ==
- St. Jerome Church (disambiguation)
