= Jahrome =

Jahrome is a given name. Notable people with the name include:

- Jahrome Brown (born 1996), New Zealand rugby union player
- Jahrome Hughes (born 1994), New Zealand rugby league footballer

== See also ==
- Jarome, given name
- Jerome (disambiguation)
