= Jeroným =

Jeroným is a Czech masculine given name. It was derived from the Greek name Hieronymus, meaning '[man with a] sacred name'. It corresponds to the English given name Jerome. Notable people with the name include:

- Jerome of Prague (Czech: Jeroným Pražský; 1379–1416), Czech scholastic philosopher and theologian
- Rafael Kubelík, full name Rafael Jeroným Kubelík (1914–1996), Czech conductor and composer
- Jaroslav Jeroným Neduha (1945–2024), Czech singer-songwriter
- Jeroným Tejc (born 1977); Czech politician and lawyer
