= Jerónimo (name) =

Jeronimo or Jerónimo is the Portuguese and Spanish form of "Jerome".

Those bearing it as a surname include:

- Tonicha Jeronimo (born 1977), a British actress
- Vlademir Jeronimo Barreto (born 1979), Brazilian footballer
- Claudemir Jerônimo Barreto (born 1981), Brazilian-born German footballer a.k.a. Cacau

Those bearing it as a given name include:

- Jerônimo de Albuquerque (1510–1584), nobleman, military leader, and colonial administrator in the Portuguese colony of Pernambuco, Brazil.
- Jerónimo de Alderete (1518–1556), Spanish conquistador
- Jerónimo Amione (born 1990), Mexican footballer
- Jerónimo de Azevedo (1560–1625), Portuguese fidalgo
- Jerónimo Barrales (born 1987), Argentinian footballer
- Jerónimo Fernandes de Cabrera Bobadilla y Mendoza, Viceroy of Perú
- Agustín Jerónimo de Iturbide y Huarte (1807–1866), son of the first Mexican Emperor Agustín I of Mexico
- Jeronimo Gomez (born 1976), American musician
- Jerónimo Lobo (1595–1678), Portuguese Jesuit missionary
- Jerónimo Saavedra (1936–2023), Spanish politician
- Jerónimo de Sousa (born 1944), Portuguese politician
- Jerônimo de Sousa Monteiro (1870–1933), Brazilian politician
- Jerónimo Morales Neumann (born 1986), Argentinian footballer
- Jerónimo Treviño (1835–1914), Mexican governor and general
- Jerónimo Zurita y Castro (1512–1580), Spanish historian

Those bearing it as an artistic name include:

- Jerónimo (Alberto Pedro Gonzales), Argentina

== See also ==
- Geronimo (disambiguation)
- Hieronymus (disambiguation)
- Saint Jerome (disambiguation)
- San Geronimo (disambiguation)
- San Jerónimo (disambiguation)
