= Elshoff =

Elshoff is a Dutch surname. Notable people with the surname include:

- Jeroen Elshoff (born 1977), Dutch football commentator
- Matthew Elshoff (born 1955), auxiliary bishop for the Archdiocese of Los Angeles
