= Gerome (given name) =

Gerome is an American masculine given name. The spelling Gérôme is also occasionally found for Jérôme in France, both as a surname and first name.

- Gerome Kamrowski (1914–2004), American artist
- Gerome Ragni (1935–1991), American actor, singer and songwriter
- Gerome Sapp (born 1981), former American football safety
- Gerome Warburton (born 1995), Welsh boxer
- Jean Leon Gerome Ferris (1863–1930), American painter

== See also ==
- Gerome (disambiguation)
