= Saint Jerome (disambiguation) =

Saint Jerome is a Christian church father, best known for translating the Bible into Latin.

Saint Jerome may also refer to:

== People ==
- Jerome of Pavia (fl. 778 – c. 787), Bishop of Pavia
- Jerome Emiliani (1486–1537), Italian humanitarian and founder of the Somaschi Fathers
- Jerome Hermosilla, one of the Vietnamese Martyrs

== Places ==
- Saint-Jérôme, Quebec, a suburb of Montreal, Canada
  - Saint-Jérôme (electoral district)
  - Roman Catholic Diocese of Saint-Jérôme
  - Saint-Jérôme line, a commuter railway line
    - Saint-Jérôme (AMT), a bus and train station
- Boyeux-Saint-Jérôme, a commune in the Ain department, France

=== Education ===
- Saint Jerome High School, a former school in Holyoke, Massachusetts, the United States
- St. Jerome's University, a university in Waterloo, Ontario, Canada

== Arts ==
- Saint Jerome (El Greco), a painting of 1609 by El Greco
- Saint Jerome (Guercino), a painting of c. 1640–1650 by Guercino
- Saint Jerome (Ribera) a painting of 1651 by Jusepe de Ribera
- Saint Jerome (Stom), a painting of c. 1635 by Matthias Stom
- Saint Jerome (Master Theodoric), a painting of c. 1370 by Master Theodoric
- Saint Jerome (Tura), a painting of c. 1470 by Cosmè Tura
- "Saint Jerome", a song by Jason Schwartzman on the 2009 album Davy

== See also ==
- St. Jerome Church (disambiguation)
- San Geronimo (disambiguation)
- San Girolamo (disambiguation)
- San Jerónimo (disambiguation)
