= Gerome (disambiguation) =

Gerome may refer to:

- Gerome (given name), an American masculine given name
- Auguste Gérôme (1857–1919), French World War I general
- Jean-Léon Gérôme (1824–1904) French painter and sculptor
- Raymond Gérôme (1920–2002), Belgian-born, French stage and screen actor
- Gerome, a character in the 1999 video game Dragon Valor
- Gerome, a character in the 2023 video game Pizza Tower

== See also ==
- Jerome (disambiguation)
- Munster cheese, or Munster-géromé, a French cheese
