= Jens van Son =

Dutch footballer (born 1987)

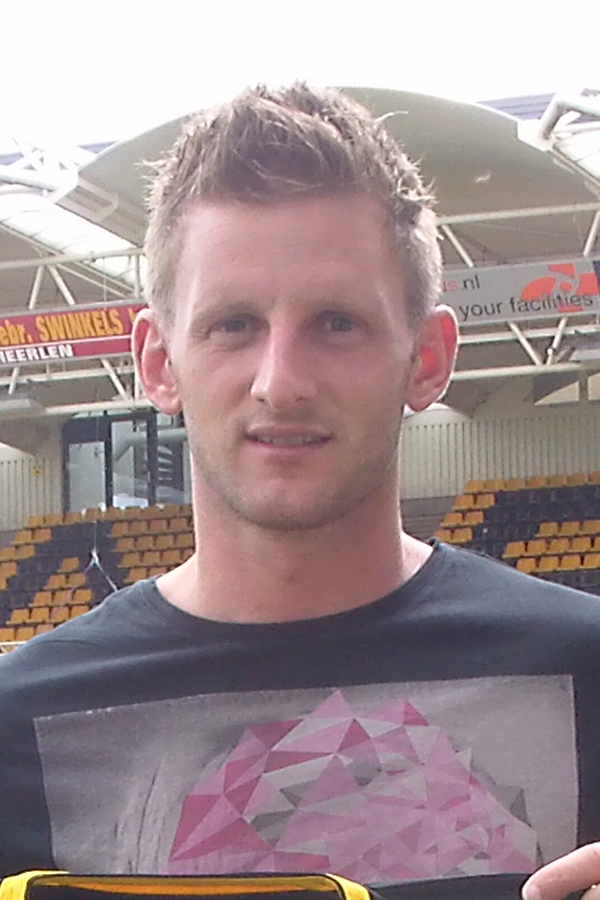
- van Son in 2015

Personal information
- Date of birth: 19 August 1987 (age 39)
- Place of birth: Valkenswaard, Netherlands
- Height: 1.79 m (5 ft 10 in)
- Position: Midfielder

Youth career
- De Valk
- VV BES

Senior career*
Years	Team	Apps	(Gls)
2006–2012	Eindhoven	114	(6)
2012–2013	Sparta	20	(0)
2013–2015	Eindhoven	69	(14)
2015–2017	Roda JC	11	(0)
2016	→ Fortuna Sittard (loan)	13	(2)
2017–2020	Den Bosch	61	(1)
2020–2022	Eindhoven	61	(1)
- * Club domestic league appearances and goals

Jens van Son (born 19 August 1987) is a Dutch former professional footballer who played as a midfielder. He formerly played for FC Eindhoven, FC Den Bosch, Sparta Rotterdam, Roda JC Kerkrade and Fortuna Sittard.
