= Jerome (given name) =

- Gender: male

Origin
- Origin: Greek
- Meaning: "sacred name"

Other names
- Related names: Geronimo, Girolamo, Hieronymus, Jerónimo

Jerome is a masculine name of Greek origin, derived from the Greek given name Ἱερώνυμος, Hierōnymos, "sacred name"; from ἱερός, hierós, "sacred", and ὄνυμα, ónyma, an alternative form of ὄνομα, ónoma, "name".

It is the name of a prominent Christian saint, Saint Jerome, the translator of the Vulgate.

Jerome ranked among the top 200 names given to boys born in the United States between 1903 and 1985. Since then its use has declined and the name was ranked 616th as the name given to American boys born in 2008.

== Variants ==
- Italian: Gerolamo, Geronimo, Girolamo
- English: Gerome, Jerome
- Sicilian: Girolamo
- Greek: Ιερώνυμος (Ieronymos)
- Latin and German: Hieronymus
- Western Frisian: Hiëronymus
- Galician and Spanish: Xerónimo
- Albanian: Jeronim
- Czech: Jeroným
- Croatian: Jerolim, Jeronim, Jerko (abbreviated), Ljerka (feminine)
- Hungarian: Jeromos
- Slovak: Hieronym, Hieroným
- Slovene: Hieronim
- Indonesian: Hieronimus
- Irish: Iaróm
- Welsh: Sierôm
- Medieval Latin: Ieronimus
- Lithuanian: Jeronimas
- Latvian: Hieronīms
- Dutch: Jeroen
- French: Jérôme
- Maltese: Ġlormu
- Esperanto: Hieronimo
- Spanish: Jerónimo, Gerónimo
- Portuguese: Jerônimo
- Catalan: Jeroni, Jerònim
- Chinese (Traditional): 耶柔米 (Yéróumǐ), 傑羅姆 (Jiéluómǔ), 希羅尼穆斯 (Xīluónímùsī)
- Galician: Xerome, Xeromo
- Polish: Hieronim

== List of people with this given name ==
- Jerome, 4th Count de Salis-Soglio (1771–1836), Anglo-Grison noble and Irish landowner
- Jerome Amos Jr. (born 1954), American politician
- Jérôme Anthony (born 1968), French television presenter
- Jerome Baker (disambiguation), multiple people
- Jerome Gautier Balthazar, Sri Lankan Burgher army brigadier
- Jerome Barkum (born 1950), American football player
- Jerome Bettis (born 1972), American football player
- Jerome Bixby (1923–1998), American writer
- Jérôme Boateng (born 1988), German football player
- Jérôme Bonaparte (1784–1860), King of Westphalia, brother of Napoleon Bonaparte
- Jerome "Jerry" Brudos (1939–2006), American serial killer, rapist, and necrophile
- Jerome Bruner (1915–2016), American psychologist
- Jerome Bwanausi (born 1959), Tanzanian politician
- Jerome Couplin (born 1991), American football player
- Jerome Cowan (1897–1972), American actor
- Jérôme d'Ambrosio (born 1985), Belgian racing driver
- Jerome Dyson (born 1987), American basketball player
- Jerome Evans (disambiguation), several people
- Jérôme Fenoglio (born 1966), French journalist
- Jerome Ford (born 1999), American football player
- Jerome Foster II (born 2002), African-American environmental activist, voting rights advocate, and virtual reality developer
- Jerome Flynn (born 1963), British actor
- Jerome Fontamillas (born 1967), American musician
- Jerome Frank (1889–1957), American judge and legal philosopher
- Jerome Frank (psychiatrist) (1909–2005), American psychiatrist
- Jerome "Jerry" Garcia (1942–1995), American musician
- Jérôme Dodo Gaye (born 1939), Ivorian sprint canoer
- Jerome Isaac Friedman (born 1930), American physicist, 1990 Nobel Physics laureate
- Jerome "Curly" Howard (1903–1952), American comedian
- Jerome K. Jerome (1859–1927), British author
- Jerome Kagan (1929–2021), American psychologist
- Jerome Kapp (born 1999), American football player
- Jerome Karle (1918–2013), American chemist
- Jerome Kern (1885–1945), American composer
- Jerome Kohl (1946–2020), American musicologist
- Jerome "Jerry" Kuehl (1931–2018), American historian and TV producer
- Jérôme Legavre (born 1972), French politician
- Jerome H. Lemelson (1923–1997), American inventor
- Jerome Meyinsse (born 1988), American basketball player in the Israeli Basketball Premier League
- Jérôme Moïso (born 1978), French basketball player
- Jerome "Jerry" Orbach (1935–2004), American actor
- Jerome Arthur Pechillo (1919–1991), American missionary and Catholic bishop
- Jérôme Peignot (1926–2025), French novelist, poet, pamphleteer, and expert in typography
- Jerome Peterson (disambiguation)
- Jerome Ponce (born 1995), Filipino actor and model
- Jerome Powell (born 1953), chair of the Federal Reserve
- Jérôme Pradon, French actor and singer
- Jerome Prince (legal scholar), American attorney, academic administrator, and legal scholar
- Jerome Prince (politician), mayor of Gary, Indiana
- Jerome "Pooh" Richardson (born 1966), American basketball player
- Jerome Robbins (1918–1998), American director
- Jerome B. Robertson (1815–1890), American doctor, politician and Confederate general
- Jérôme Rothen (born 1978), French footballer
- Jerome T. Youngman (born 1951), American musician
- Jerome Salinger (1919–2010), American author
- Jerome Seinfeld (born 1954), American comedian
- Jerome Silberman (Gene Wilder), American actor, comedian, writer and filmmaker
- Jerome B. Simandle (1949–2019), American federal judge
- Jerome Starkey (born 1981), English journalist, broadcaster and author
- Jerome Tuccille, American libertarian writer and activist
- Jérôme Valcke (born 1960), French football administrator
- Jerome Vered (born 1958), American television contestant
- Jerome Wiesner (1915–1994), American science advisor and educator
- Jerome J. Workman Jr. (born 1952), American biological chemist
- Jerome of Périgord (died 1120), French monk and bishop in Spain
- Jerome Polin (born 1998), Indonesian internet celebrity and entrepreneur
- Jerome of Prague (1379–1416), Czech church reformer and follower of Jan Hus
- Jerome of Sandy Cove (c.1835–1912), unidentifiable amputee discovered in Nova Scotia in 1863
