= Jerome Starkey =

English journalist, broadcaster and author (born 1981)

Jerome Starkey (born 1981, London) is an English journalist, broadcaster and author best known for covering wars and the environment. He is the defence editor at The Sun newspaper and presents their weekly Frontline show on YouTube.

He was banned from Russia in 2022 and put on a Russian wanted list in 2025 for covering the war in Ukraine. He had previously challenged US forces over civilian casualties in Afghanistan and he was deported from Kenya in 2017 after covering corruption and extra-judicial killings.

He regularly appears on TV and radio and helped wounded paratrooper Ben Parkinson write his acclaimed autobiography.

== Early life ==
Starkey grew up in London and won an academic scholarship to attend Stowe School in Buckinghamshire.

== Education ==
He studied English literature at Newcastle University.

== Career ==
He joined The Sun newspaper in 2003 as a graduate trainee. He moved to The Times in 2010 before returning to The Sun in 2020.

=== Afghanistan ===
In 2006 he moved to Kabul, Afghanistan, to write propaganda for NATO's International Security Assistance Force (Isaf). He served with the Combined Joint Psy-Ops Taskforce (CJPOTF) which produced a fortnightly newspaper called Sada-e Azadi, or Voice of Freedom in Dari. He resigned after six months, complaining that the newspaper was "terrible". Later he wrote in The Times how Sada-e Azadi was sold by the kilogram as scrap before it could reach readers.

Starkey returned to Kabul as a freelance journalist. From 2008 until 2010 he worked for a range of broadcasters and newspapers including Sky News, France 24, The Scotsman and The Independent. At The Independent he led a successful campaign to free a student journalist Sayed Pervez Kambaksh, who had been sentenced to death for blasphemy.

Starkey claimed that he was black-listed by the military in Afghanistan as a result of his work on civilian casualties.

In 2010 his investigation into a Night Raid on Narang, in Kunar Province, eastern Afghanistan, led NATO's International Security Assistance Force to admit it had killed eight schoolboys by mistake.

The previous year he linked the newly formed Marine Special Operations Command (MARSOC) to three of the worst civilian casualty incidents in Afghanistan's recent history including the Granai Airstrike in Bala Balouk, the Azizabad Airstrike in Herat province and the Shinwar Massacre in Nangahar province.

In 2010, together with his colleagues Shoib Najafizada and Jeremy Kelly, Starkey exposed a cover-up by US Special Forces after an operation known as the Raid on Khataba which inspired the Oscar-nominated documentary Dirty Wars.

During the raid, on 12 February 2010, unidentified special forces soldiers killed five innocent people including two pregnant women, a teenage girl engaged to be married and two brothers who worked for the local government in Paktia province in eastern Afghanistan. All of the victims were from the same family. Initially the soldiers said the women were victims of a triple honour killing. They said they discovered the women's bodies "tied up, gagged and killed" and that the dead men were insurgents.

When Starkey challenged Nato's account they accused him of lying. However, four weeks later William H. McRaven, the commander of America's Joint Special Operations Command (JSOC), admitted his soldiers were responsible. McRaven travelled to the family's compound, outside Gardez and offered to sacrifice a sheep outside their door in a ritual act of Nanawatai, to seek their forgiveness.

In 2010, Jerome was nearly killed during an embed with British troops in Helmand Province when an Improvised explosive device (IED) exploded fewer than 10 metres in front of him. The explosion, inside a designated safe area which had recently been cleared by the Royal Engineers, killed Corporal David Barnsdale and injured two others. The British Army tried to censor his account on the grounds that it was too graphic. Senior officers, who were not at the scene, claimed the bomb was not inside the safe area.

=== Kenya ===
In 2012 The Times posted Starkey to Nairobi, Kenya and appointed him Africa Correspondent.

He was deported from Nairobi in 2017 as a result of his work. The government of Uhuru Kenyatta gave no official explanation.

==== Fall of Kabul ====
He returned to Kabul in 2021 as the Taliban seized control of Kabul.

=== Ukraine ===
Starkey has covered the war in Ukraine since the full scale invasion in Feb 2022.

In August 2022 Russia's Foreign Ministry banned him from entering Russia, along with 38 others including Labour leader Keir Starmer and former Prime Minister David Cameron who they accused of spreading Russophobia.

In August 2024 Starkey reported from occupied Russian Kursk which Ukrainian forces had captured in a surprise attack.

A court in Kursk accused Starkey of entering Russia illegally and put him on an international wanted list. Starkey quipped it was "nice to feel wanted" and has continued to report from across Ukraine.

== Awards ==
Starkey won the Frontline Club award for excellence in 2010 and the Kurt Schork memorial prize in 2011. He was named Multimedia Journalist of the year by London Press Club in 2022 and Reporter of the Year at the 2023 Press Awards.
