= Jeronimas =

Jeronimas is a male Lithuanian given name, derived from Hieronymus. Notable people with the name include:

- Jeronimas Kačinskas (1907–2005), Lithuanian-born American composer
- Jeronimas Milius (born 1984), Lithuanian singer and Eurovision Song Contest 2008 participant
- Jeronimas Plečkaitis (1887–1963), Lithuanian teacher and politician
- Jeronimas Uborevičius (also known as Ieronim Uborevich; 1896–1937), Lithuanian-Soviet military commander
