= Hieronymi =

Hieronymi is a surname. Notable people with this surname include:

- Károly Hieronymi (1836–1911), Hungarian engineer and politician
- Pamela Hieronymi, American philosopher and moral psychologist
- Ruth Hieronymi (1947–2025), German politician

== See also ==
- Hieronyma, a genus in the plant family Phyllanthaceae
- Hieronymites, a Catholic cloistered religious order
- Hieronymus, a name of Ancient Greek origin
