= Hieronim =

Hieronim is the Polish form of Hieronymus and may refer to:

- Hieronim Barczak (born 1953), Polish footballer
- Hieronim Chodkiewicz (1500–1561), Vilnius ciwun in 1542
- Hieronim Czarnowski (1834–1902), Polish chess master and activist
- Hieronim Dekutowski (1918–1949), a Polish boyscout and soldier, who fought in Polish September Campaign
- Hieronim Augustyn Lubomirski (1647–1706), Polish noble (szlachcic), magnate, politician and military commander
- Hieronim Morsztyn (1581–1623), Polish poet
- Hieronim Radziejowski (1612–1667), Polish szlachcic
- Hieronim Florian Radziwiłł (1715–1760), Polish-Lithuanian szlachcic
- Hieronim Wincenty Radziwiłł (1759–1786), Polish-Lithuanian nobleman
- Hieronim Jarosz Sieniawski (1516–1579), Polish noble
- Hieronim Wietor (c. 1480–1546/47), printer in Vienna and Kraków
- Hieronim Wołłowicz (died 1625), Lithuanian vice-chancellor and Lithuanian grand treasurer
