= San Jerónimo District =

San Jerónimo District may refer to:

- Peru:
  - San Jerónimo District, Andahuaylas, in Andahuaylas province, Apurímac region
  - San Jerónimo District, Cusco, in Cusco province, Cusco region
  - San Jerónimo District, Luya, in Luya province, Amazonas region
- Costa Rica:
  - San Jerónimo District, Esparza, in Esparza (canton), Puntarenas province
  - San Jerónimo District, Moravia, in Moravia (canton), San José province
  - San Jerónimo District, Naranjo, in Naranjo (canton), Alajuela province

== See also ==
- San Jerónimo (disambiguation)
