= Valkenswaard =

- Municipality
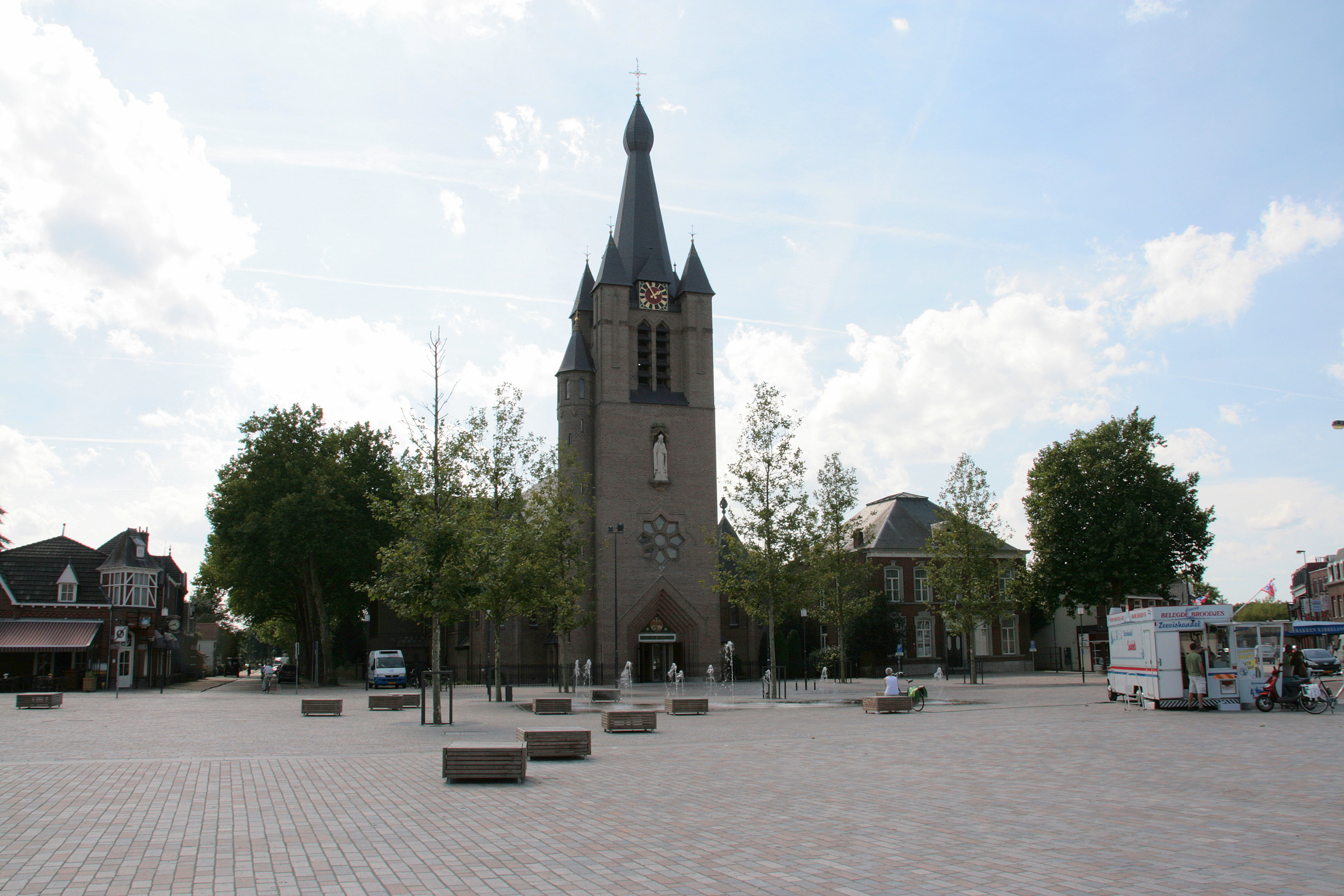
- Church in Valkenswaard

- Flag Coat of arms

- Location in North Brabant
- Coordinates: 51°21′N 5°28′E
- Country: Netherlands
- Province: North Brabant

Government
  - Body: Municipal council
  - Mayor: Corine van Overdijk (VVD)

Area
  - Total: 56.50 km^{2} (21.81 sq mi)
  - Land: 54.92 km^{2} (21.20 sq mi)
  - Water: 1.58 km^{2} (0.61 sq mi)
- Elevation: 25 m (82 ft)

Population (January 2021)
  - Total: 31,221
  - Density: 568/km^{2} (1,470/sq mi)
- Demonym: Valkenswaarder / Valkenswaardenaar
- Time zone: UTC+1 (CET)
  - Summer (DST): UTC+2 (CEST)
- Postcode: 5550–5556
- Area code: 040
- Website: www.valkenswaard.nl

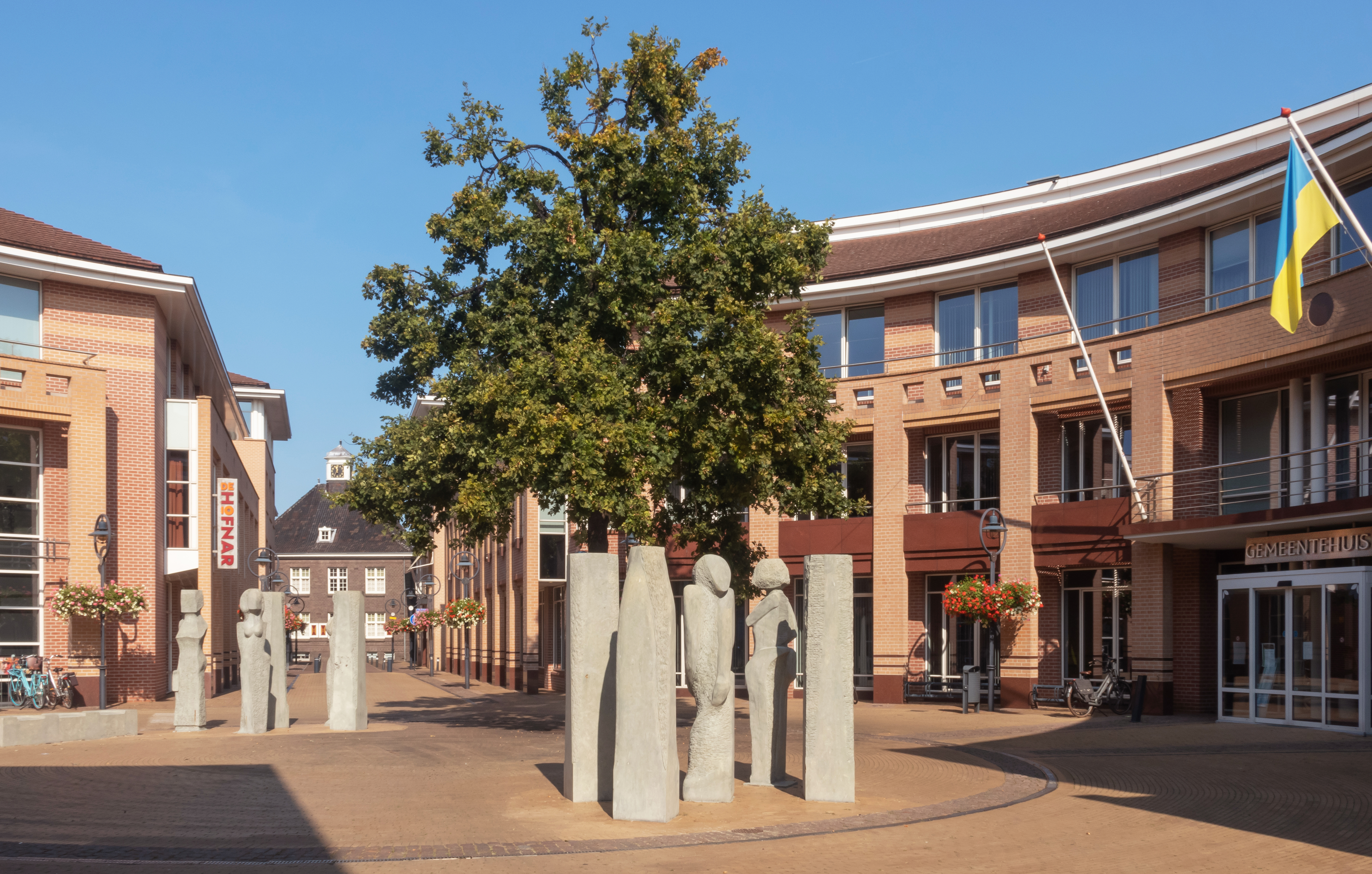
Temporar sculptures in front of the townhall

Valkenswaard (Dutch pronunciation: [ˌvɑlkə(n)sˈʋaːrt]) is a municipality and a town in the southern Netherlands, in the Metropoolregio Eindhoven of the province of North Brabant. The municipality had a population of 31,221 in 2021, with an area of 56.50 km^{2} (21.81 sq mi) of which 1.58 km^{2} (0.61 sq mi) is water.

The name Valkenswaard stems from its history of falconers, who caught wild falcons there; valk is Dutch for "falcon". It lay on a route where falcons migrated south each year. In the 17th, 18th, and 19th centuries, Valkenswaardian falconers were active at many European courts, in which falconing was a beloved pastime. Valkenswaard's falcon-catching area has now been built over and falcons are no longer caught there.

In the 19th and 20th century, a number of large cigar factories were founded in Valkenswaard, the two most renowned of which being Willem II and Hofnar.

A Second World War cemetery containing 220 British soldiers was created near Valkenswaard in October 1944. It is now maintained by the Commonwealth War Graves Commission.

The spoken language is Kempenlands (an East Brabantian dialect, which is very similar to colloquial Dutch).

The Eurocircuit Valkenswaard is a motorsport racetrack that has hosted the European Rallycross Championship and the FIM Motocross World Championship.

== Economy ==
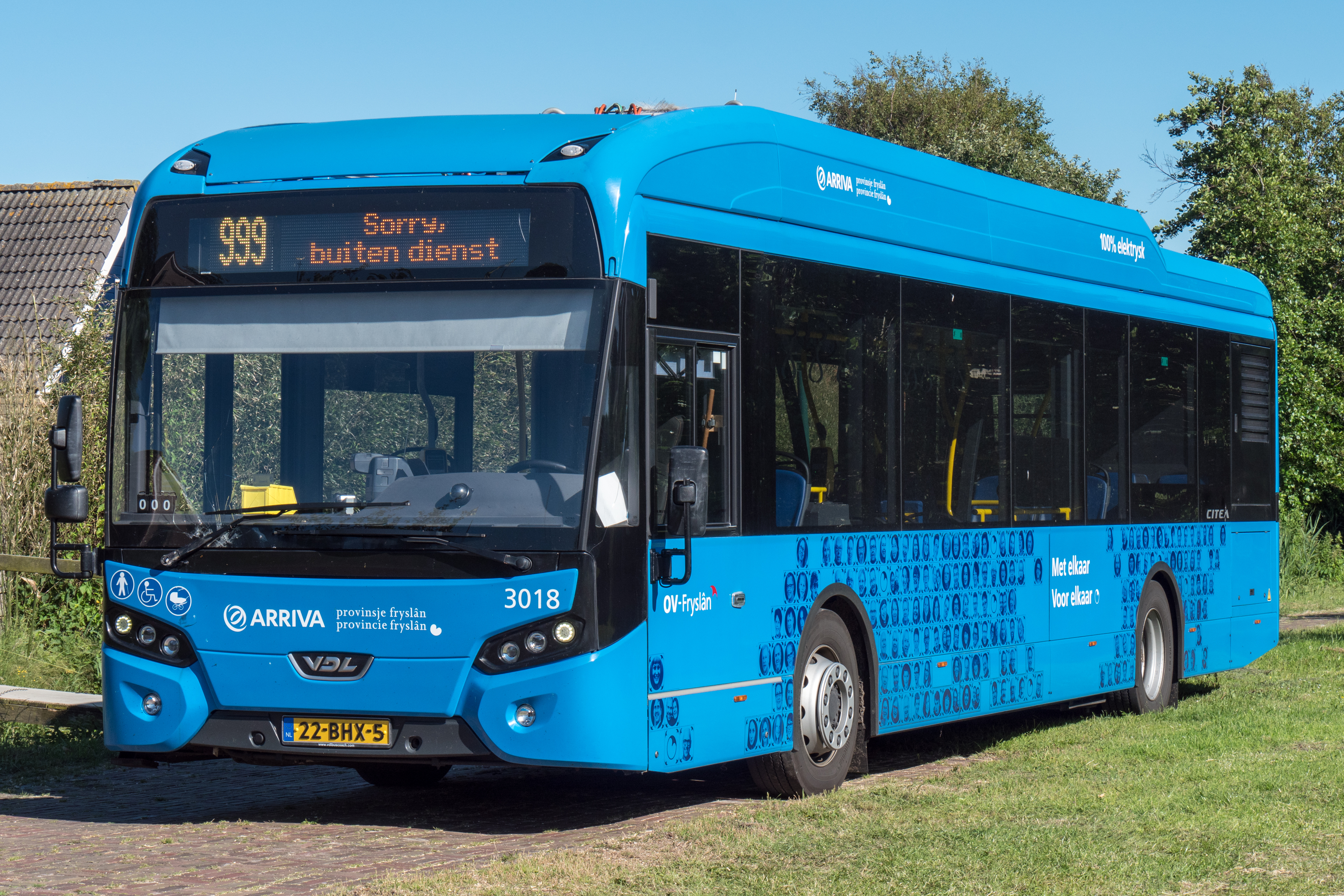
VDL Citea SLF-120 Electric in Nes (Ameland)

Companies, that are headquartered in Valkenswaard include Brabantia, a residential use product manufacturer, and VDL Bus & Coach, a vehicle manufacturer specializing in constructing buses.

== Population centres ==
- Borkel en Schaft
- Dommelen
- Valkenswaard

=== Topography ===
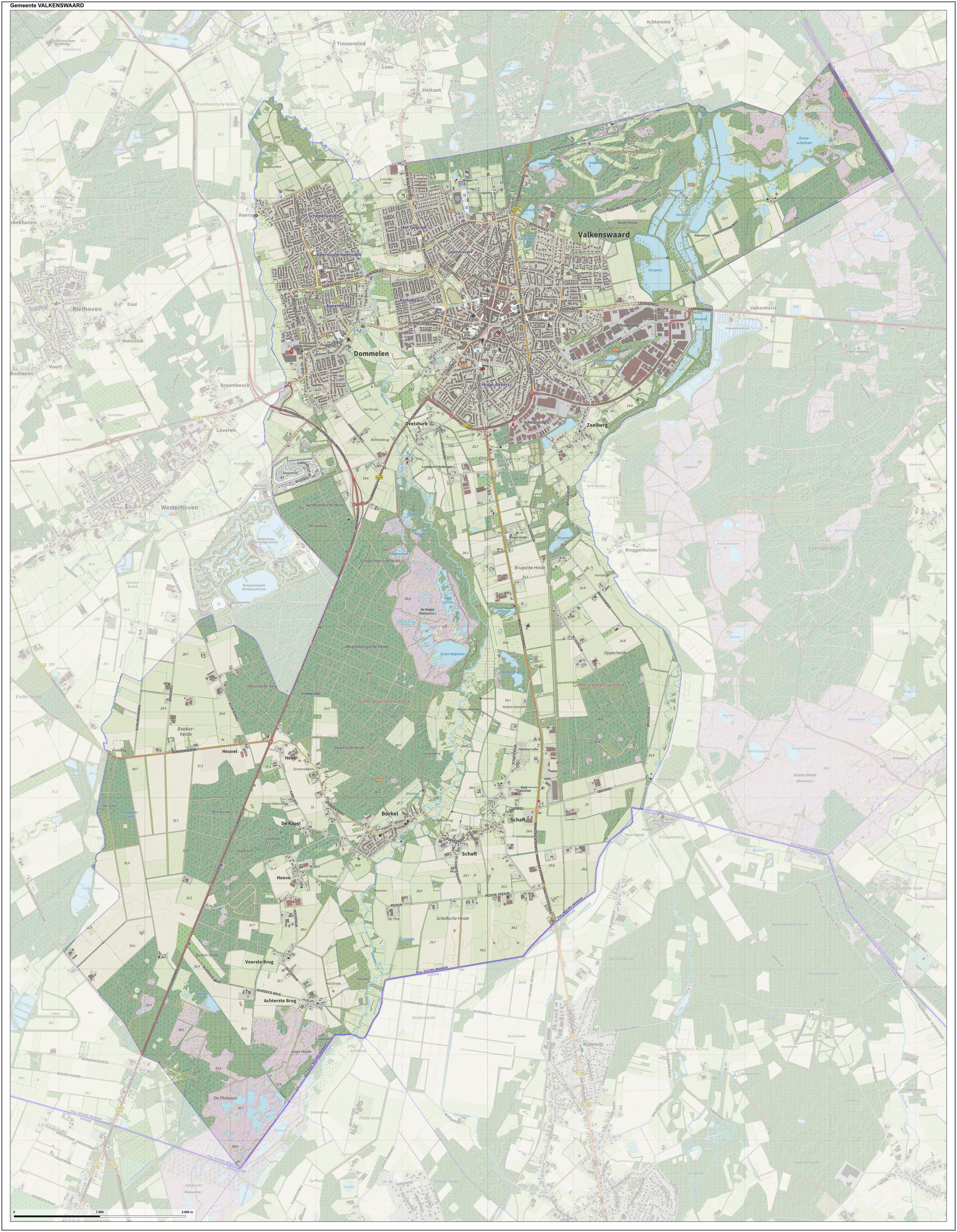
Map of the municipality of Valkenswaard, June 2015

== Partner municipalities ==
- Salvaterra de Magos, Portugal
- Tienen, Flanders, Belgium

== Notable people born in Valkenswaard ==
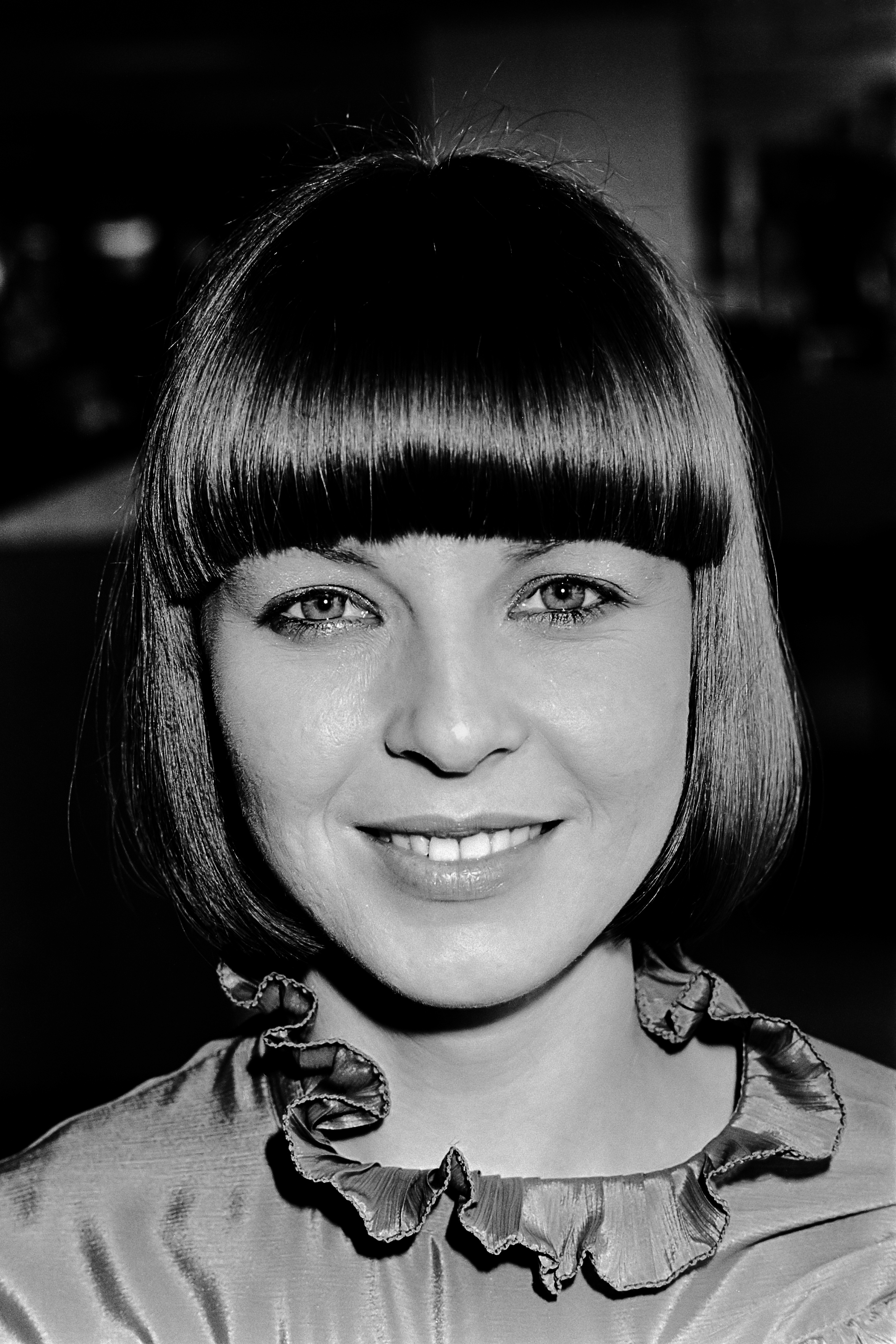
Linda Williams, 1981

- Henk van den Breemen (1941–2024) a Dutch military officer
- Pieter van Geel (born 1951) a retired Dutch politician
- Linda Williams (born 1955) a Dutch singer, participated in the 1981 Eurovision Song Contest
- Ine Gevers (born 1960) a Dutch curator of contemporary art, writer and activist
- Jeroen Mettes (1978–2006) a Dutch poet, essayist and blogger
- Dominique van Hulst (born 1981), singer, known by her stage name Do

=== Sport ===
- Jan Tops (born 1961) an equestrian, gold medallist at the 1992 Summer Olympics
- Jens van Son (born 1987) a Dutch professional footballer with over 250 club caps
- Lidewij Welten (born 1990) a Dutch field hockey player
- Daniëlle van de Donk (born 1991) a Dutch professional footballer

== Gallery ==
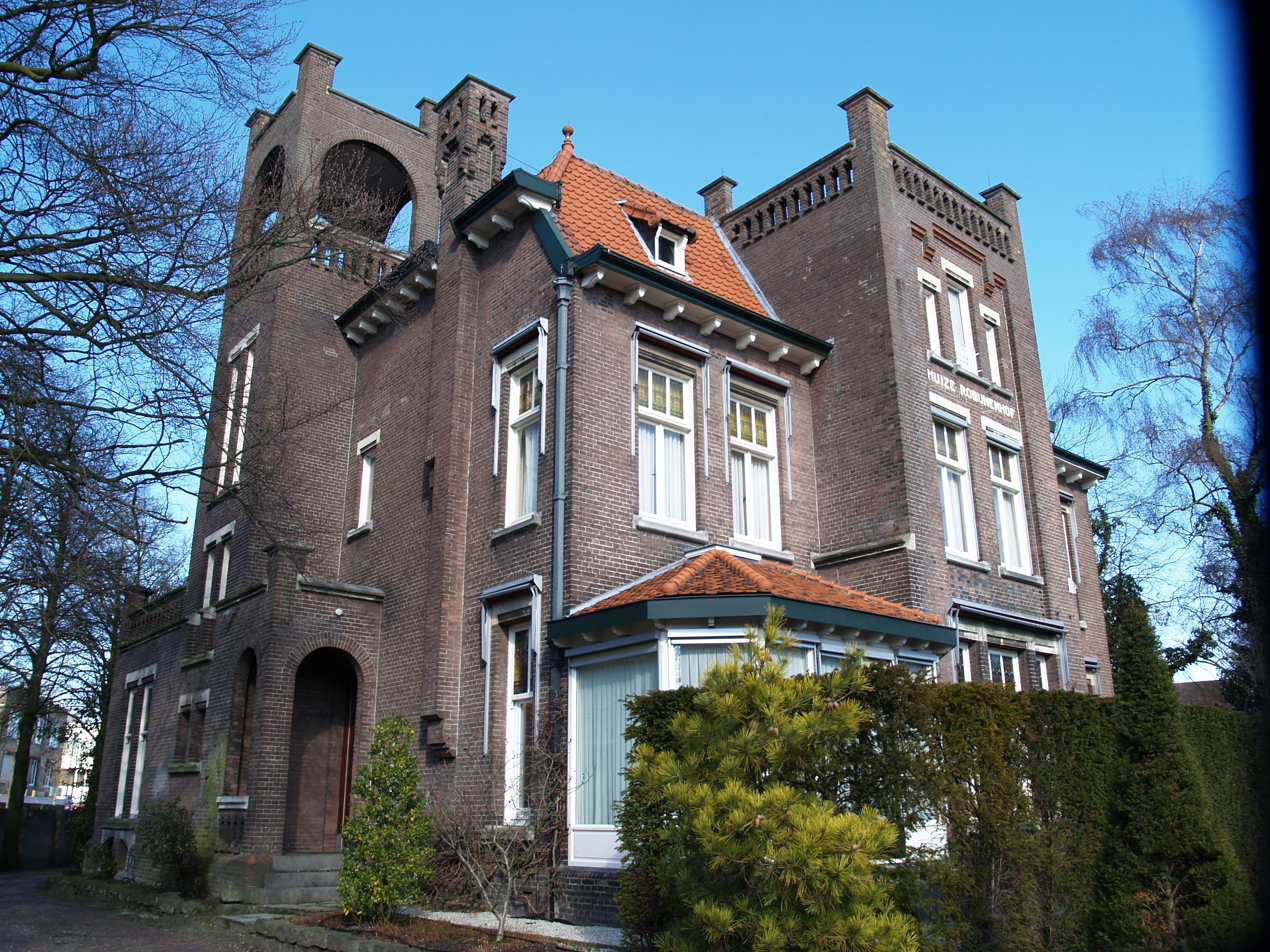
Notary office, Valkenswaard

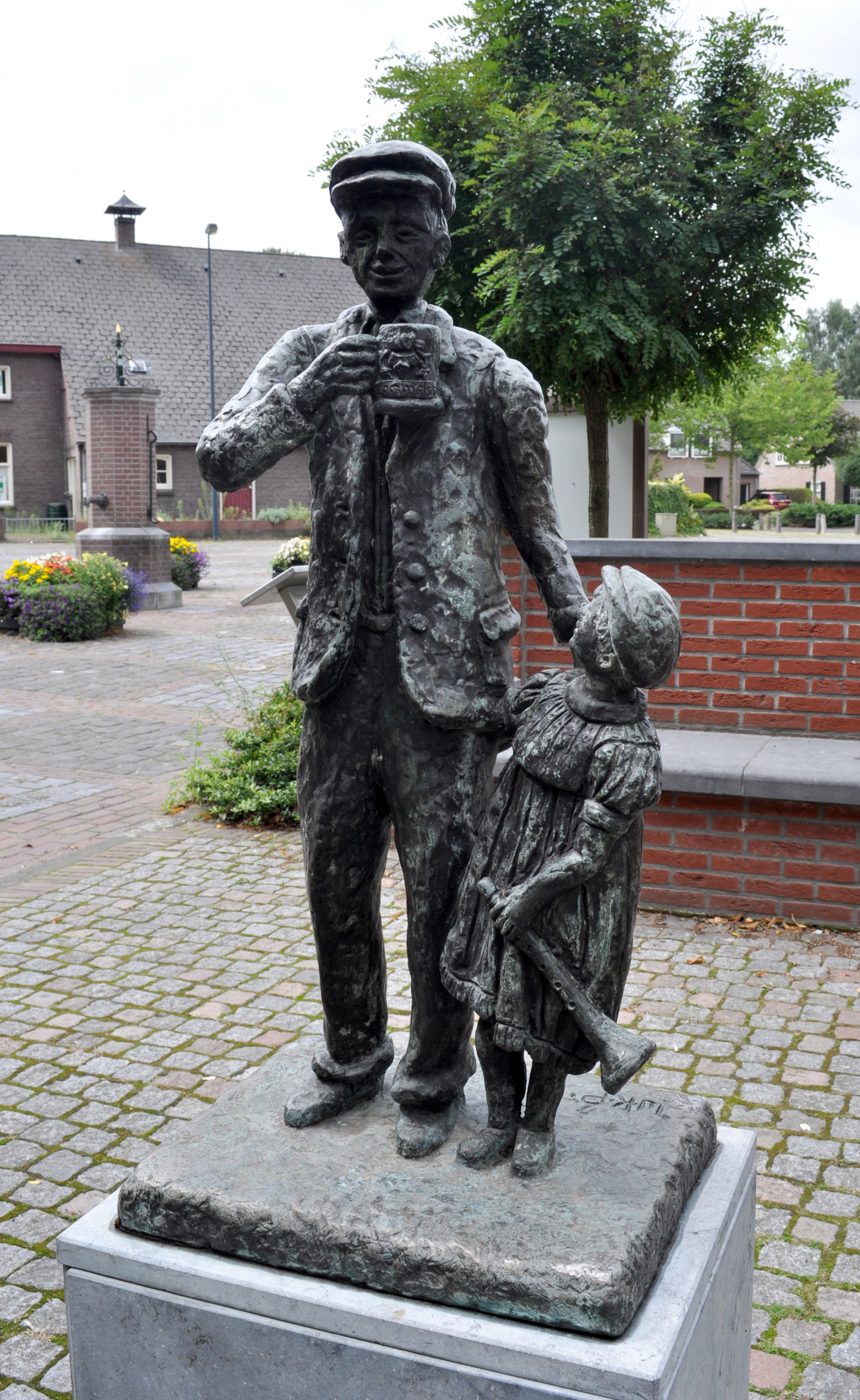
Pintenwipper statue, Martinusplein Dommelen

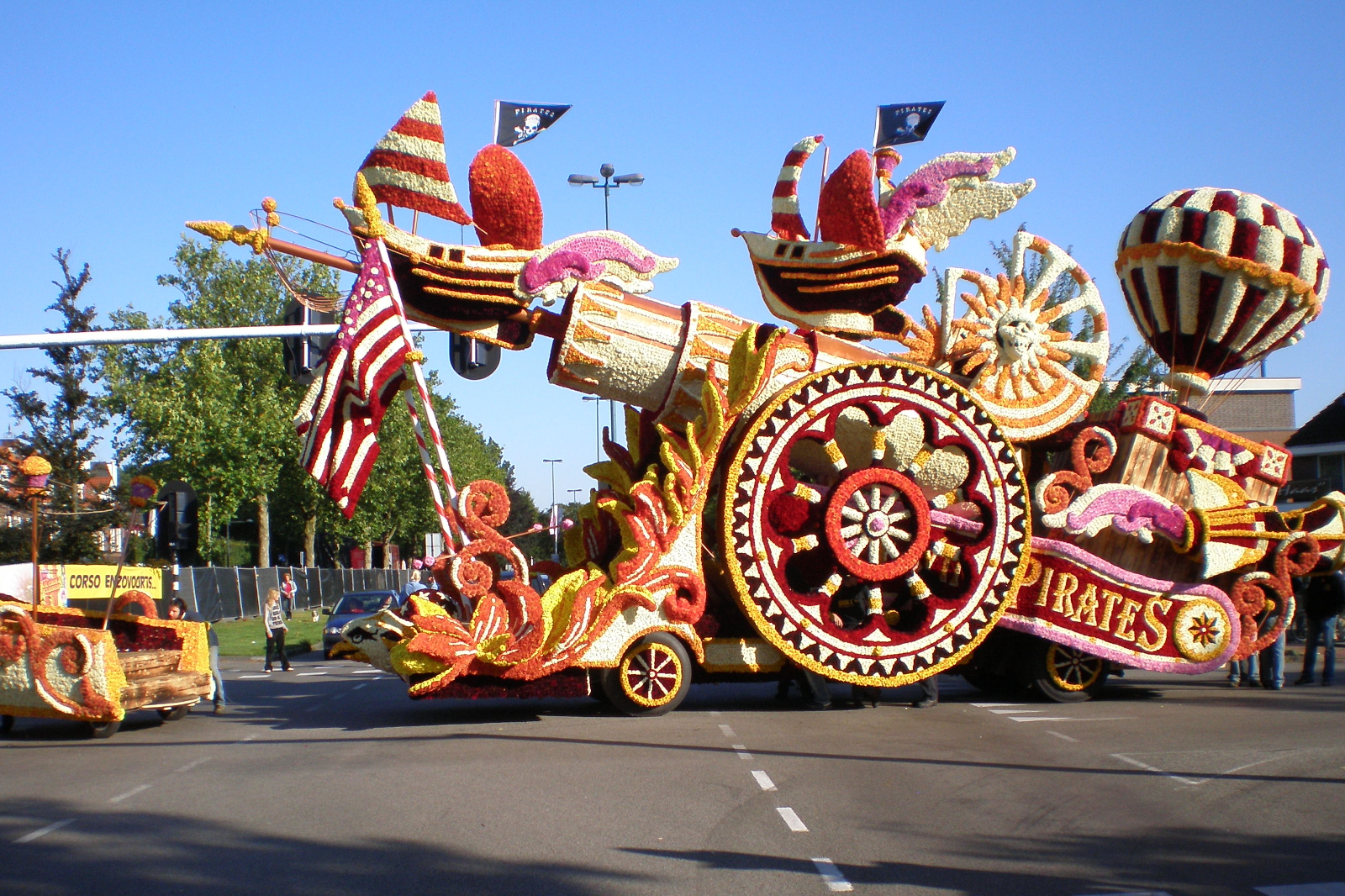
Winnaar 2008 - Buurtschap Hazestraat - Flying pirates on music

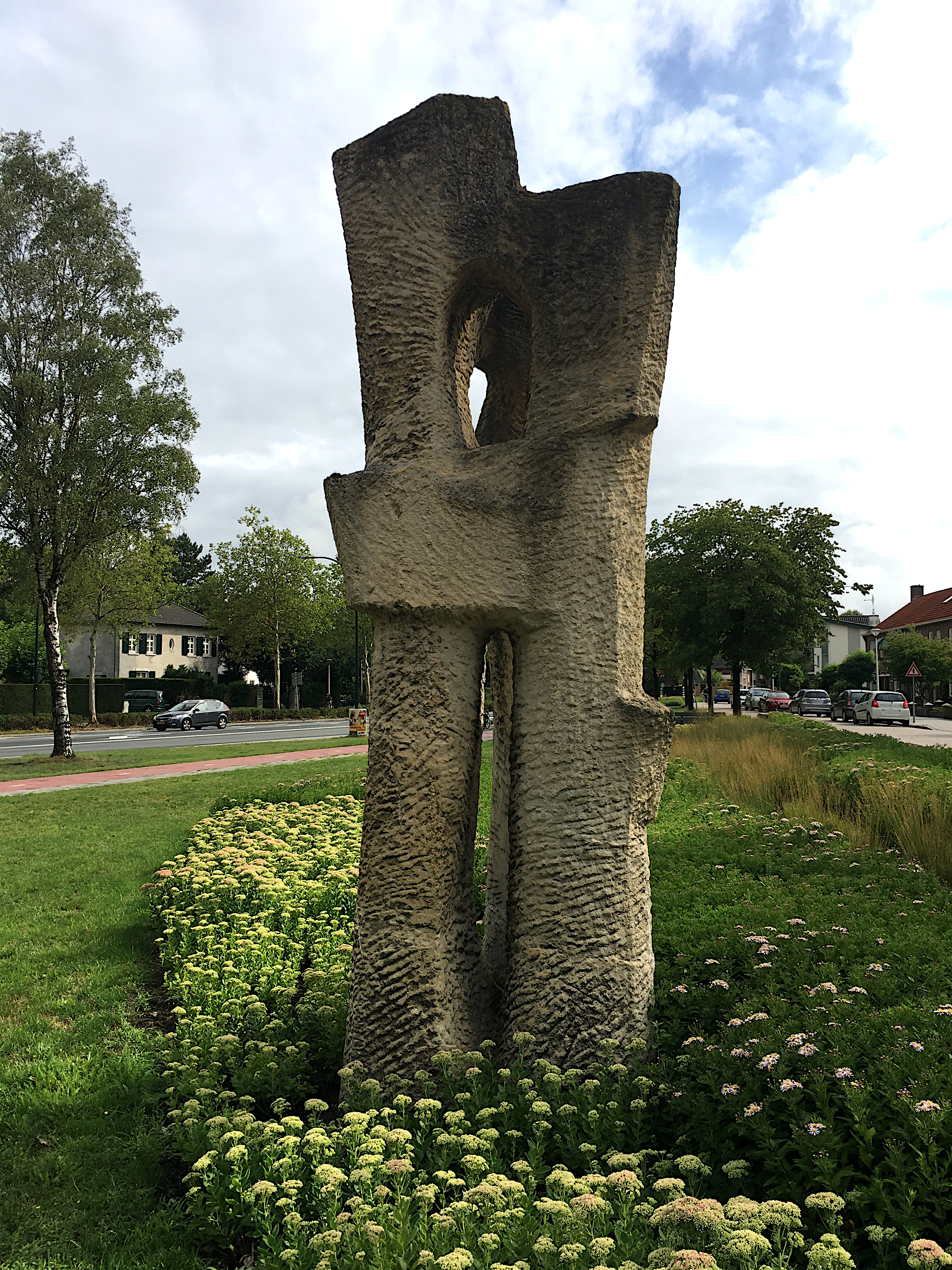
Column of Unity by Erich Reischke, Valkenswaard
