= Borkel en Schaft =

- Flag Coat of arms
- Interactive map of Borkel en Schaft
- Coordinates: 51°17′51″N 5°26′30″E
- Country: Netherlands
- Province: North Brabant
- Municipality: Valkenswaard

Population (2007)
  - Total: 575 (Borkel); 166 (Schaft)

Borkel en Schaft is a former municipality in the Netherlands, consisting of the villages of Borkel and Schaft. It was a separate municipality until 1934. The area is now part of the municipality of Valkenswaard. The spoken language is Kempenlands (an East Brabantian dialect, which is very similar to colloquial Dutch).
