= Geronimus polynomials =

Families of orthogonal polynomials studied by Yakov Lazarevich Geronimus

In mathematics, Geronimus polynomials may refer to one of the several different families of orthogonal polynomials studied by Yakov Lazarevich Geronimus.

== Bibliography ==
- Geronimus, J. (1930), "On a Set of Polynomials", Annals of Mathematics, Second Series, 31 (4): 681–686, doi:10.2307/1968164, ISSN 0003-486X, JSTOR 1968164
- Lebedev, V. I. (2000), "On the solution of inverse problems and trigonometric forms for the Geronimus polynomials. Application to the theory of iterative methods", Russian Journal of Numerical Analysis and Mathematical Modelling, 15 (1): 73–93, doi:10.1515/rnam.2000.15.1.73, ISSN 0927-6467, MR 1748149
- Peherstorfer, Franz (1992), "On the asymptotic behaviour of functions of the second kind and Stieltjes polynomials and on the Gauss-Kronrod quadrature formulas", Journal of Approximation Theory, 70 (2): 156–190, doi:10.1016/0021-9045(92)90083-Z, ISSN 0021-9045, MR 1172017
