= Jeroen Mettes =

Dutch poet, essayist and blogger (1978–2006)

Jeroen Mettes (24 March 1978 – 21 September 2006) was a Dutch poet, essayist and blogger.

== Life ==
Jeroen Mettes was born in Eindhoven and grew up in Valkenswaard. He studied philosophy in Utrecht, and literary studies at Leiden University, where he worked on his thesis on poetic rhythm until his death in 2006 in The Hague.

In 1999, he began writing the long prose-poem he called N30. This was the code-name of the 1999 Seattle protests organised during the WTO negotiations. The protesters were demanding a global recognition of fair trade, trade unions and environmental legislation. Seven years later, in 2006, Mettes had written a poem, 60,000 words long.

In 2005, Jeroen Mettes started the blog Poëzienotities (Poetry Notes). An important part of that blog was Poet Alphabet, in which Mettes discussed—in alphabetical order—the poetry he found in Verwjis Bookstore, in his hometown of The Hague. He started with the A (Anne van Amstel), and would end with the G (Goudeseune). As a poet, Jeroen Mettes debuted in the journal Parmentier. In his early twenties, he had already contributed prose to, among other magazines, Zoetermeer and Passionate. In 2006, Mettes joined the editorial staff of the magazine yang, while continuing to write for Parmentier.

On 21 September 2006, he published an empty post on his blog. That same day, he chose to end his life. He left behind his poems, essays and his blog.

== Work ==
In 2011, Jeroen Mettes’ Nagelaten werk (Posthumous Works), consisting of two parts, was published by Wereldbibliotheek. His poetry was collected in the volume N30 +. This volume is mostly filled with the long prose poem N30, which consists of 32 chapters. A selection of blog entries and the surviving essays were bundled under the title Resistance Policy. The Flemish poet and literary scholar Geert Buelens wrote the afterword. The two parts of Nagelaten werk were compiled by Piet Joosten, Frans-Willem Korsten and Daniel Rovers.

== Critical reception ==
Mettes was initially known for his blog, and is since gaining recognition for his work through the publication of N30. Mettes received critical recognition for his work from Samuel Vriezen, Eva Cox, J. H. De Roder, and later Jos Joosten, Geert Buelens and Marc Kregting. Excerpts from N30 were translated into English by Vincent W. J. van Gerven Oie, and published in Continent in 2012.

Mettes was posthumously nominated for the C. Buddingh prize for N30

== See also ==
- Language poets
- Bruce Andrews
- Experimental literature
