= Jeroen Stekelenburg =

Dutch sports journalist

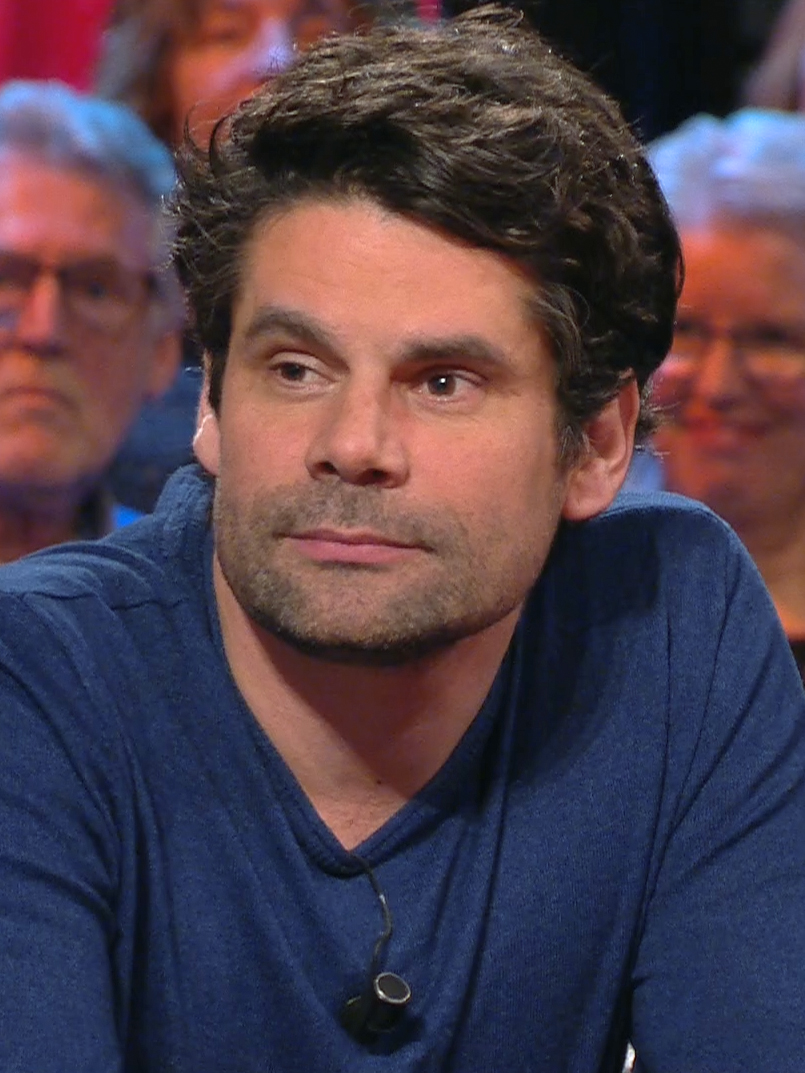
Jeroen Stekelenburg (2018)

Jeroen Stekelenburg (born May 26, 1974) is a Dutch sport commentator. He has worked as a reporter for the NOS program Studio Sport. since 2004

== Early life ==
Jeroen Stekelenburg was born on May 26, 1974, in Vinkeveen. He studied communication science at the University of Amsterdam.

== Family ==
His father Jan Stekelenburg was editor of Studio Sport and his older brother Maarten Stekelenburg is a soccer coach.
