= Jérôme Bonaparte (disambiguation) =

Jerome Bonaparte may refer to:

- Jérôme Bonaparte (1784–1860), King Jerome I of Westphalia, Prince of Montfort, Marshall of France, President of the French Senate
  - Jérôme Napoléon Bonaparte (1805–1870), son of above, American farmer
    - Jerome Napoleon Bonaparte II (1830–1893), American soldier, son of above
    - Jerome Napoleon Charles Bonaparte (1878–1945), son of above
  - Jérôme Napoléon Charles Bonaparte (1814–1847), Prince of Montfort
    - Prince Jérôme Napoléon (1822–1891), son of above
