= Girolamo (given name) =

Girolamo is an Italian variant of the given name Hieronymus. Its English equivalent is Jerome.

It may refer to:

- Girolamo Cardano (1501–1576), Italian Renaissance mathematician, physician, astrologer and gambler
- Girolamo Cassar (c. 1520–after 1592), Maltese architect and military engineer
- Girolamo da Cremona (fl. 1451–1483), Italian Renaissance painter
- Girolamo della Volpaia (c. 1530–1614), Italian clock maker
- Girolamo Fracastoro (1478–1553), Italian physician, scholar, poet and atomist
- Girolamo Frescobaldi (1583–1643), Italian musician
- Girolamo Li Causi (1896–1977), Italian Communist politician
- Girolamo Luxardo (1821–), Italian liqueur factory
- Girolamo Maiorica (c. 1591–1656), Italian Jesuit missionary to Vietnam
- Girolamo Masci (1227–1292), Pope Nicholas IV (1288–1292)
- Girolamo Palermo (1938–2014), American mobster
- Girolamo Porro (c. 1520–after 1604), Italian engraver
- Girolamo Riario (1443–1488), Lord of Imola and Forlì
- Girolamo Romani (1485–1566), Italian High Renaissance painter
- Girolamo Savonarola (1452–1498), Italian Dominican priest and leader of Florence
- Girolamo Tiraboschi (1731–1794), Italian literary critic
- Girolamo da Treviso (1508–1544), Italian Renaissance painter
- Girolamo Zanchi (1516–1590), Italian Protestant Reformation clergyman and educator
- Girolamo Zenti (1609–1666), Italian harpsichord maker

== See also ==
- Girolamo (surname)
