= Jeroen Van Den Broeck =

Belgian footballer

Personal information
- Date of birth: 16 February 1989
- Place of birth: Belgium
- Date of death: 23 November 2017 (aged 28)
- Positions: Defender; midfielder

Senior career*
Years	Team	Apps	(Gls)
20xx–2006	A.S. Verbroedering Geel	0	(0)
2006–2008	Rangers F.C.	0	(0)
2008–2010	AGOVV Apeldoorn	4	(0)
2010–2011	KFC De Kempen Tielen-Lichtaart		
2011–2012	Hoogstraten VV	1	(0)
2012–20xx	KFC Sint-Lenaarts		
20xx-2016	Houtvenne		
2016–2017	SC City Pirates Antwerpen		
2017	OG Vorselaar		
- * Club domestic league appearances and goals

Jeroen Van Den Broeck (16 February 1989 – 23 November 2017) was a Belgian footballer who last played for OG Vorselaar in his home country.

== Career ==
Van den Broeck started his senior career with A.S. Verbroedering Geel. In 2008, he signed for AGOVV Apeldoorn in the Dutch Eerste Divisie, where he made five appearances and scored zero goals.
