= Jeroen Kramer =

Dutch photographer

Jeroen Robert Kramer
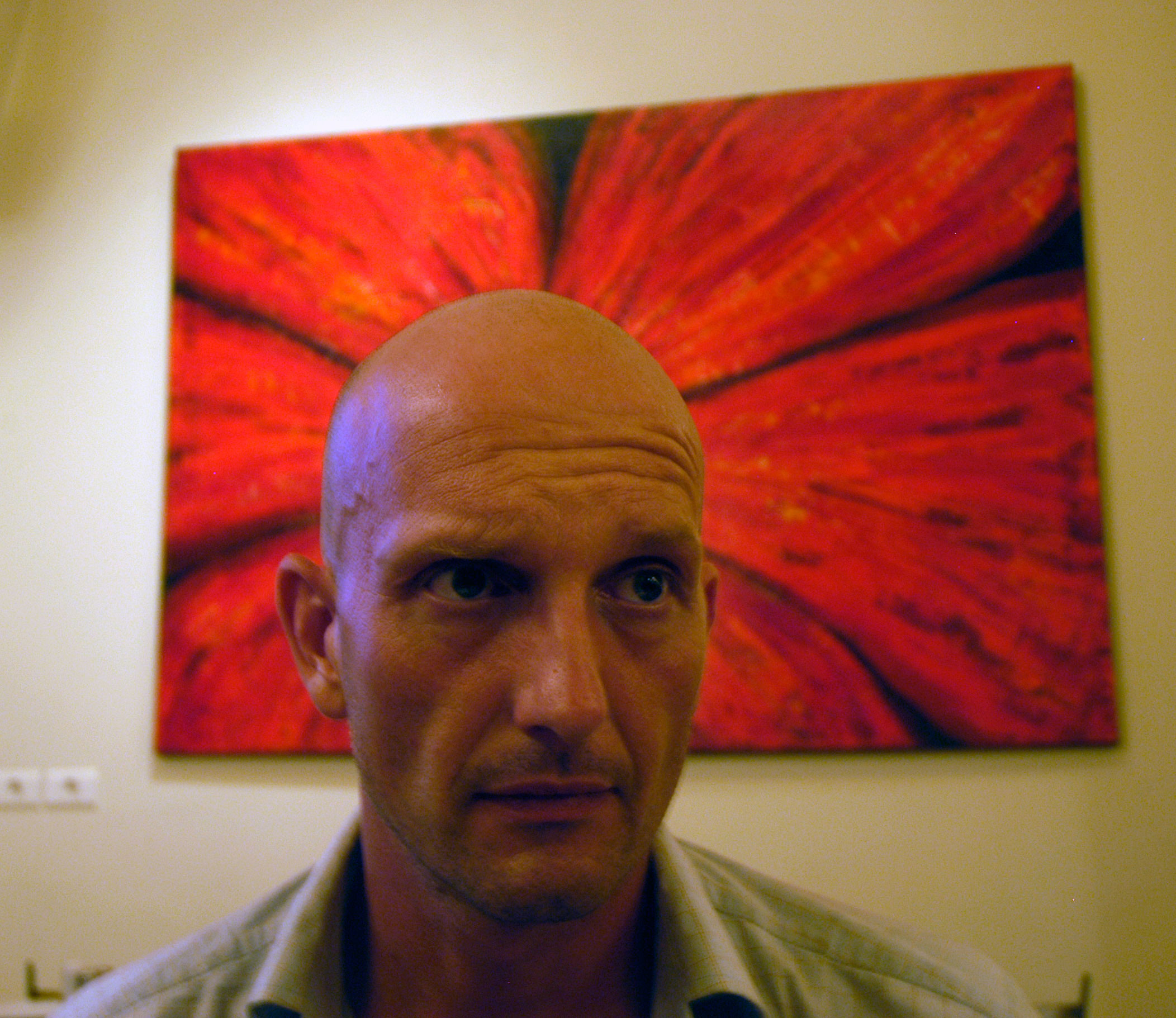
- Born: April 26, 1967 (age 58); Amsterdam
- Occupations: Contemporary artist, photographer
- Years active: 1990 present
- Awards: Dutch Doc 2010

Jeroen Robert Kramer (born 1967 in Amsterdam) is a Dutch contemporary photographer. He started his career as a freelance photographer for the Dutch quality daily De Volkskrant which sent him to Iraq to cover the invasion in 2003. Since then he has worked extensively in the Middle east. He is most famous for his work for magazines and newspapers such as The New York Times, Vanity Fair and Der Spiegel that has taken him to many conflict zones in the past decade, including Afghanistan, Kenya, Lebanon, Iraq, the Philippines and Pakistan.

In 2008 Kramer decided he no longer wanted to work as a documentary photographer. This led to the publication of his book Room 103 in which he mixes ordinary life in the Middle east with images of violence. In his opinion his earlier work focused too much on violence and thereby created a distorted view of the world. With Room 103, he gives an intimate view of life in the Middle east. The book was awarded the top Dutch documentary award, The Dutch Doc award and the New York Photo festival book award.

== Selected bibliography ==
- Une Femme ISBN 978-94-90503-05-5
- Beyrouth objets trouvés ISBN 978-90-76703-49-7
- Dutch Heights 2010 ISBN 978-94-90529-03-1
- Room 103 ISBN 978-90-76703-42-8
- La vita nuda ISBN 978-88-370-6463-1
- Act of faith ISBN 978-90-76703-32-9
- Nazar ISBN 978-1-931788-85-4

== Awards ==
- 2011 Dutch art council grant.
- 2010 New York Photo Festival book award.
- 2010 Dutch doc award.
- 2007 Zilveren Camera
- 2005 Zilveren Camera.
- 2004 Fuji award.

== Selected exhibitions ==
- 2016 Museum for Photography Amsterdam
- 2012 Museum of contemporary art Rome
- 2012 Breda photo festival
- 2011 Q contemporary art gallery (Lebanon)
- 2011 New York Photo Festival (United States)
- 2010 Umam Documentation & Research (Lebanon)
- 2009 Noorderlicht (The Netherlands)
- 2008 Triennale di Milano (Italy)
- 2007 Act of Faith ( The Netherlands)
- 2005 Fotofest Houston Texas (United States)
- 2004 Nazar Noorderlicht (The Netherlands)
