= Girolamo (surname) =

Girolamo is a surname of Italian origin that may refer to:

- Claudia di Girolamo (1956–), Chilean actress
- Diego De Girolamo (1995–), English footballer
- Elena Di Girolamo, Argentine politician
- Emilia di Girolamo, British writer
- Heidi Girolamo (1983–), Australian politician
- Leopoldo Di Girolamo (1951–), Italian politician
- Mariana di Girolamo (1990–), Chilean actress
- Nunzia De Girolamo (1975–), Italian politician
- Orlando DiGirolamo (1924–1998), American jazz musician
- Paolo Di Girolamo (1994–), Italian lightweight rower
- Rémi Di Girolamo (1982–), French rower

== See also ==
- Girolamo (given name)
