= Jean Jérôme (disambiguation) =

Jean Jérôme (1906–1990) was a Polish Jew-French communist activist and Resistance member.

Jean Jérôme or Jean-Jérôme may also refer to:

- Jean-Jérôme Adam (1904–1981), French Roman Catholic archbishop
- Jean Jérôme Hamer (1916–1996), Belgian Cardinal
- Jean-René Jérôme (1942–1991), Haitian painter
- Jean-Robens Jerome (born 1983), Haitian footballer

== See also ==
- Jean-Léon Gérôme (1824–1904), French painter and sculptor
