= Jerome Evans =

Jerome Evans may refer to:

- Jerome Evans (American football) (died 1995), American football coach
- Jerome Evans (singer) (1938–2003), American singer
- Silkski (Jerome Albert Evans Jr.), American producer and rap artist
