= St. Jerome Church =

St. Jerome Church may refer to:

- Franciscan Church, Vienna or Church of St. Jerome, Vienna, Austria
- Saint Jerome of the Croats in Rome, Italy
- Monastery of Saint Jerome (Granada), a church and monastery in Granada, Spain
- Saint Jerome Parish Church in Morong, province of Rizal, Philippines
- St Jerome's Church, Llangwm, Monmouthshire, Wales, UK
- St. Jerome Church (Norwalk, Connecticut), US
- St. Jerome Croatian Catholic Church in the Bridgeport community area of Chicago, Illinois, US
- St. Jerome's Church (Bronx, New York), US
- St. Jerome Church (Mapusa), Goa, India
- St. Jerome Church (Kashimira), Mira Road, India.
- Saint-Jérôme Church (Toulouse), a church in Toulouse, France

== See also ==
- Saint Jerome (disambiguation)
- Fancy Farm, Kentucky, a community that grew around St. Jerome Church, built in 1836
