= Saint Jerome (Master Theodoric) =

Painting by Master Theodoric

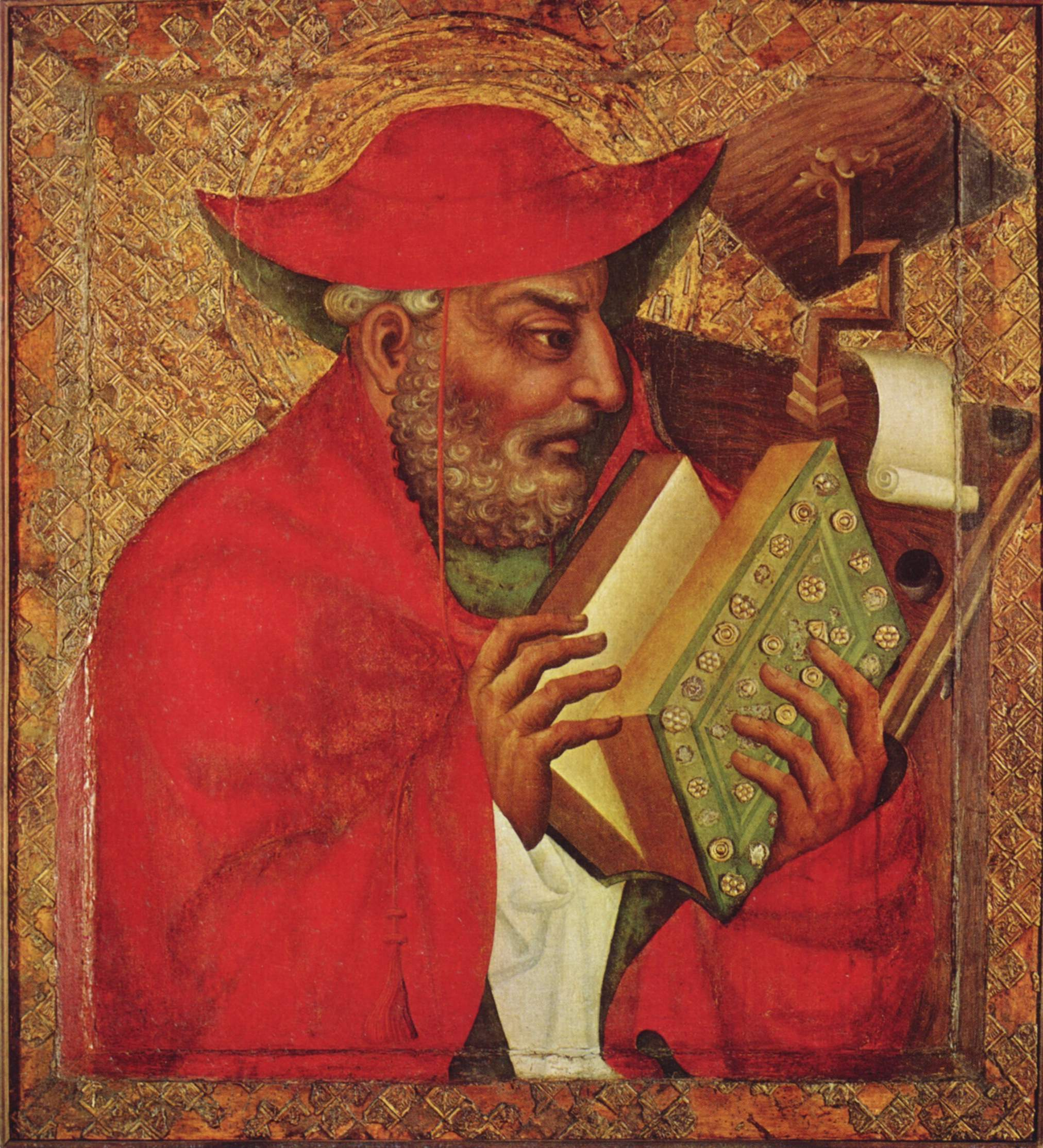
- Saint Jerome (Master Theodoric)
- Artist: Master Theodoric
- Year: 1360 - 1365
- Medium: oil tempera on beech board
- Dimensions: 114,5 cm × 103,7 cm (451 in × 408 in)
- Location: National Gallery, Prague

Saint Jerome is one of the finest paintings by Master Theodoric in the Chapel of the Holy Cross at Karlštejn. He has an honourable place in the hierarchy of the Holy Fathers and his portrait is placed in the south window niche of the chapel together with St. Augustine, St. Ambrose and St. Gregory. It is one of the oldest and most frequently reproduced depictions of St. Jerome. The painting is exhibited in the collection of medieval art of the National Gallery in Prague.

== Description and classification ==
The original frame is decorated with embossed decoration. The preparatory black brushwork of the drapery is detailed and models numerous folds. In the area of the face, the drawing has been changed - compared to the original version with a three-quarter profile, the composition has been changed to a full profile, which the executed painting follows exactly. The profile of St. Jerome corresponds to one of the basic facial types used by the Master of the Luxembourg Family Tree and his workshop (Henry VII, Holy Roman Emperor). Theodoric had previously used a similar type in the mural Adoration of the Three Kings on the vault of the window niche in the Chapel of the Holy Cross.

Remains of the golden halo and the relief decoration of the background of the painting survive. The squares of pastiglia alternate between the motif of an eagle and a lion in leap. The still life with the reader's and scribe's desk is missing from the preparatory drawing and was probably added by one of the painters working in Theodoric's workshop.

Jerome is depicted as a cardinal, but this ecclesiastical rank did not exist at the time he lived (347-420). The cardinal's hat and cloak symbolize his position as personal secretary to Pope Damasus I.

== Historical context ==
Jerome came from Stridon (present-day Bosnia) and was therefore considered a Slavic saint. Charles IV, who claimed his Bohemian origins and descent from the Přemyslid dynasty, decided to revive the Slavic liturgy and the Cyril and Methodius tradition and to create a centre of Slavic ecclesiastical scholarship from where the faith in the Slavic language would be spread among the Bohemians and other Slavs. As early as 1347, he founded the Emmaus Monastery, dedicated to St. Jerome and the Virgin Mary, and invited Benedictine monks from the area of present-day Croatia, the so-called Glagolitic monks, to "celebrate services in the Slavic language in honour of St. Jerome, the translator of the Holy Scriptures from Hebrew into Latin and Slavonic."

Saint Jerome is best known as the author of the translation of the Bible from Hebrew into common Latin (Vulgate). He studied classical antique literature and languages in Rome, was baptized there, and went to the Roman Christian catacombs to repent and remember human mortality. He spent part of his life as an ascetic in the desert, and during an illness there he had a vision, after which he gave himself entirely to the study of the Bible. Pope Damasus I charged him with the task of revising the biblical texts. Thanks to St. Jerome, the Roman Synod of 382 adopted the document "Decretum Gelasianum", which established the biblical canon. Jerome was also the author of 135 short biographies of Church scholars, De Viris Illustribus.

He is usually depicted with a bible and skull as a memento mori, as a scholar writing at his desk, with a lion whom he had thorn pulled out of his paw in the desert, as a hermit and penitent before a revealed crucifix, and as a cardinal. He is the patron saint of translators, librarians and encyclopedists.

=== St. Jerome in art ===
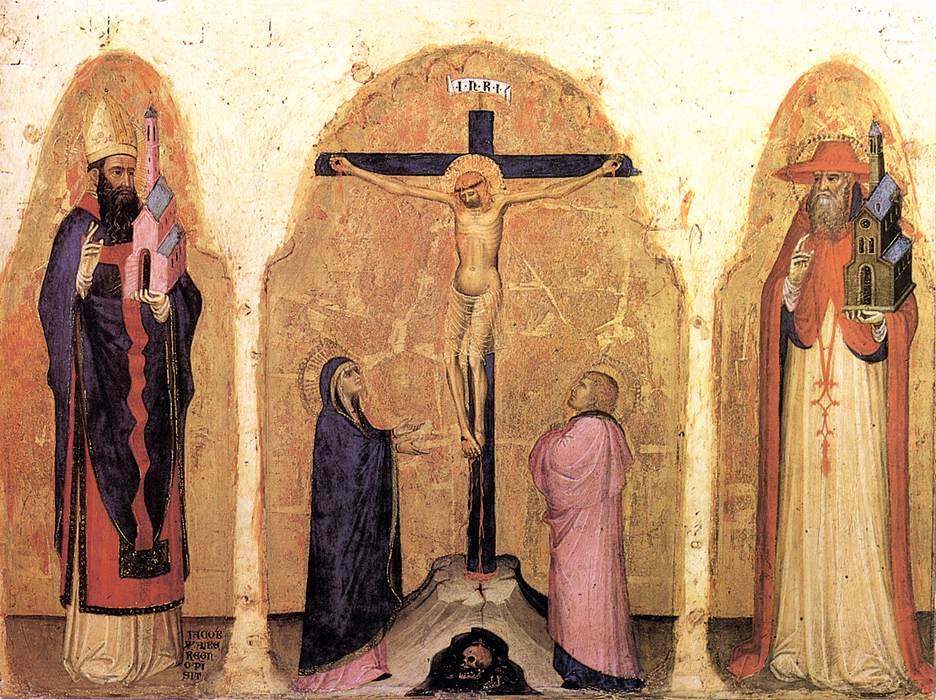
Jacobello Alberegno, Crucifixion with St. Gregory and St. Jerome (1375-97)

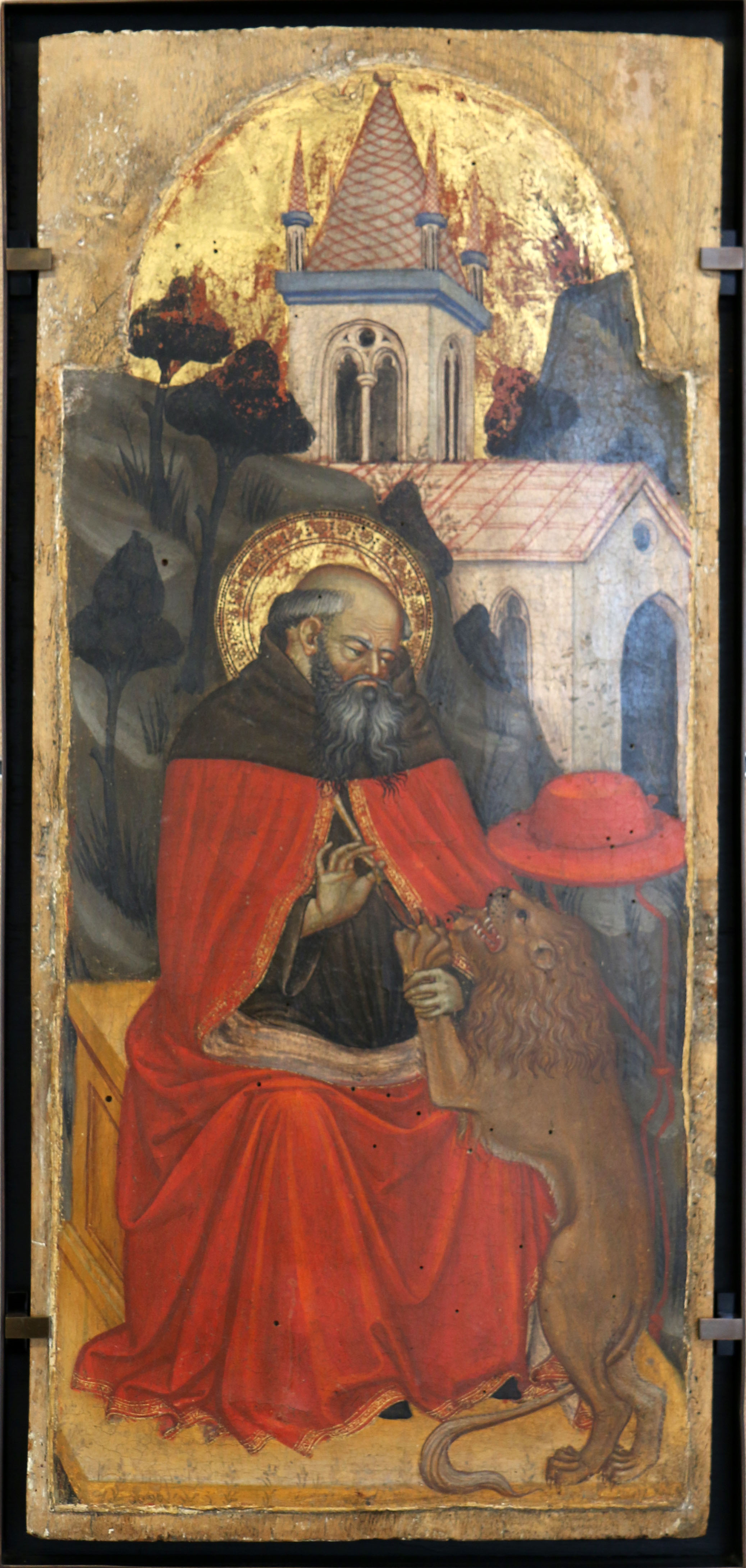
Ottaviano Nelli-Saint Jérôme et le lion (1415)

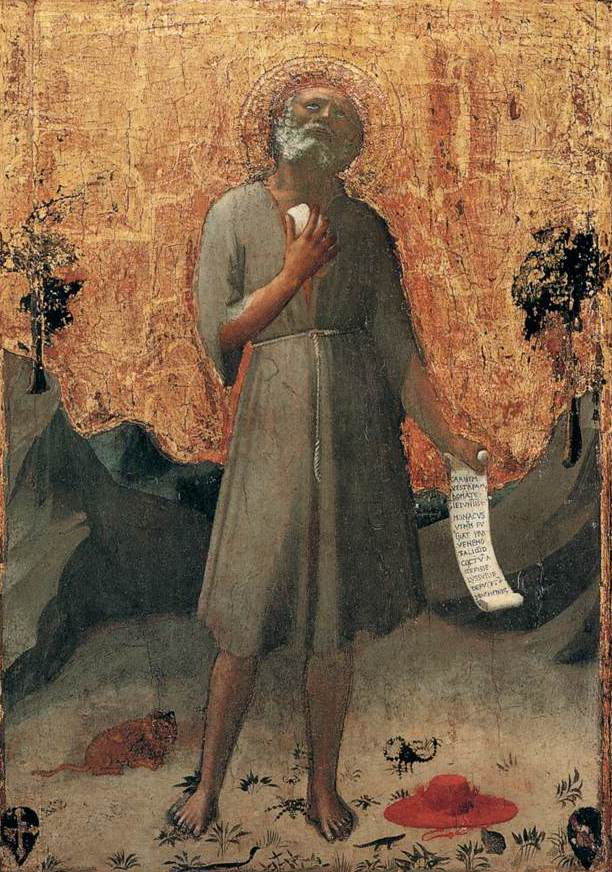
Fra Angelico, Penitent St Jerome (1424)

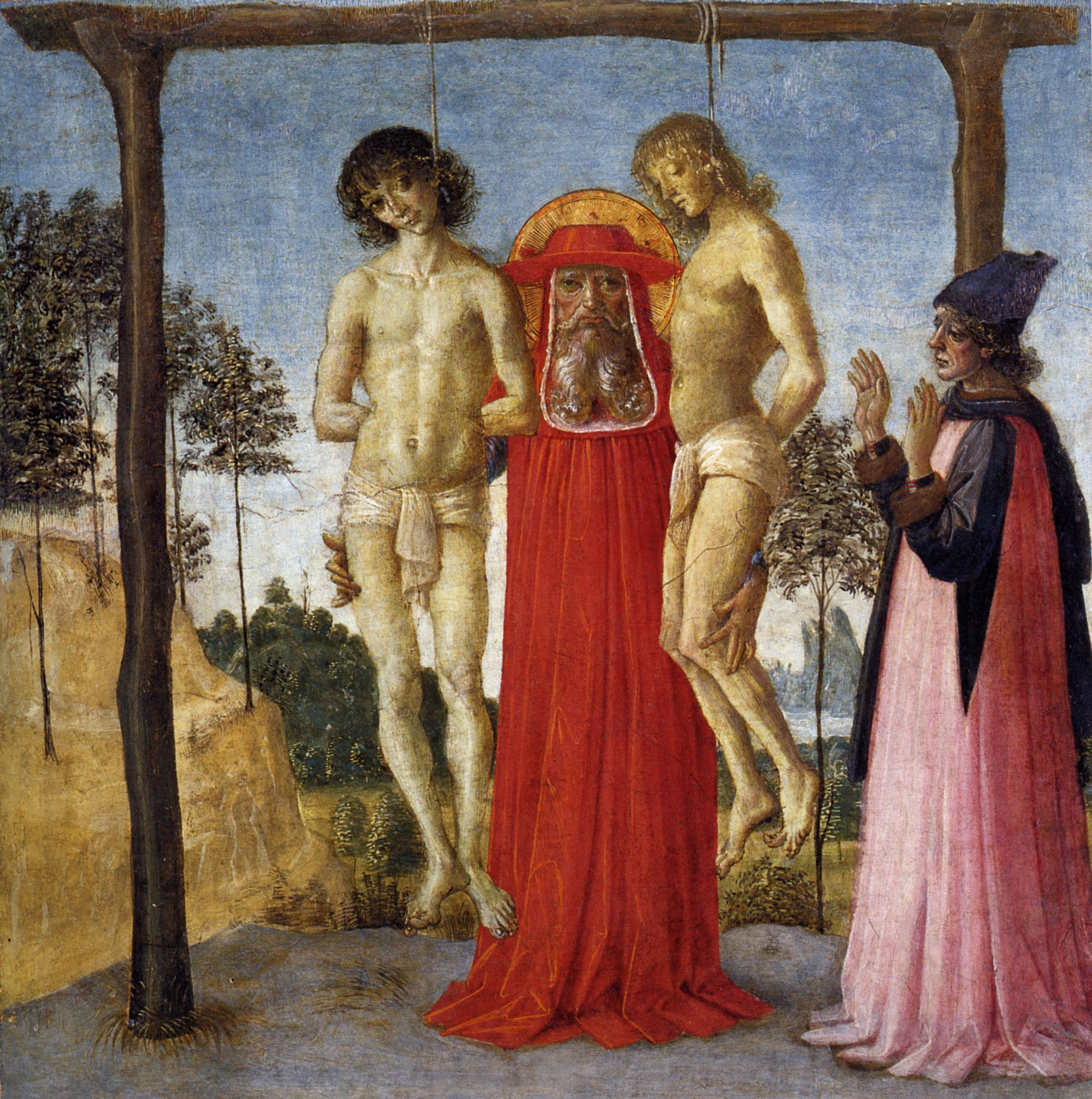
Pietro Perugino, San Girolamo che assiste due giovani impicatti ingiustamente (1470)

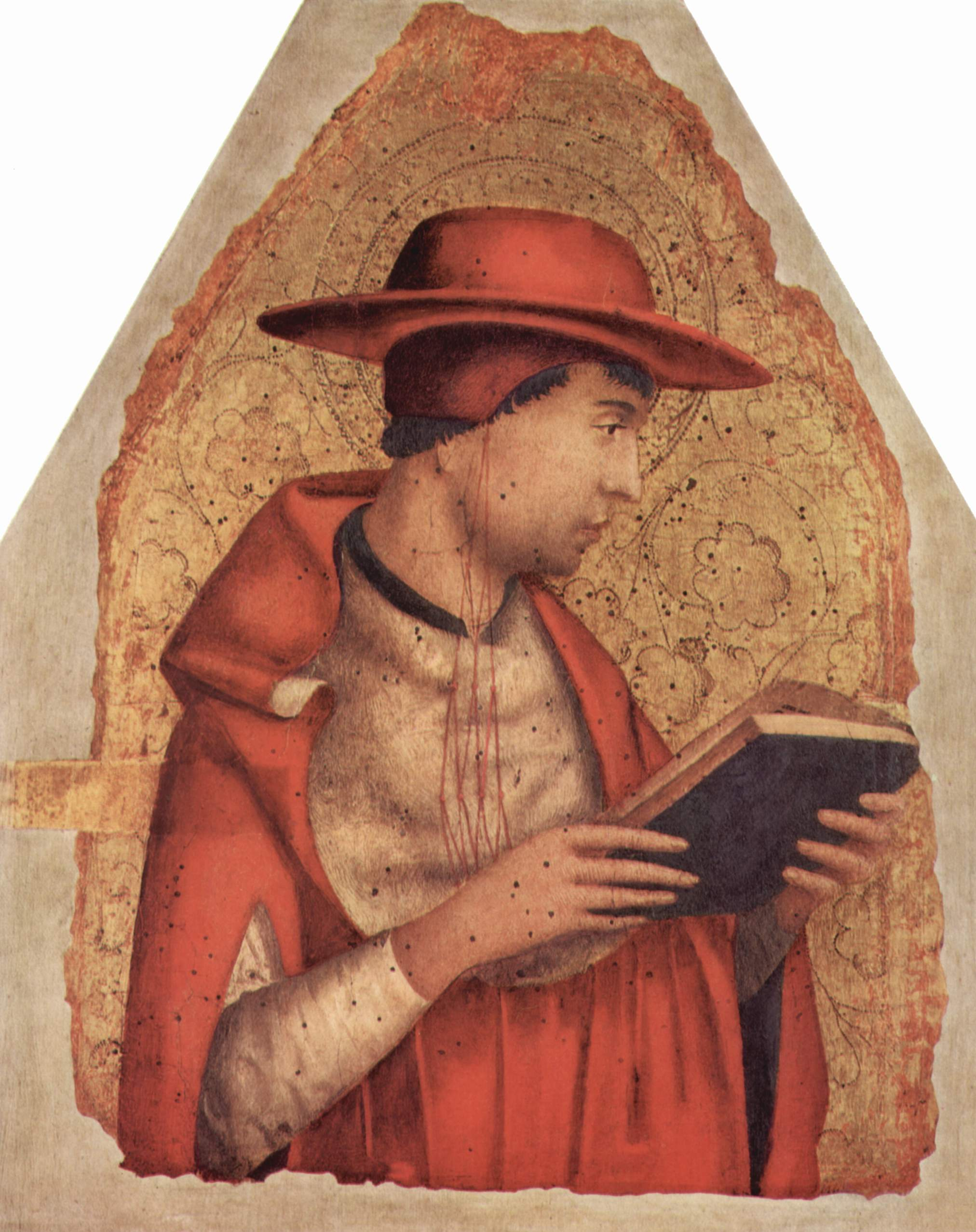
Antonello da Messina, Saint Jerome wearing a galero (1472)

== Sources ==
- Kateřina Kubínová, The Emmaus Cycle, Artefactum Prague 2012, ISBN 978-80-86890-36-4
- Jiří Fajt (ed.), Magister Theodoricus, court painter to Emperor Charles IV, National Gallery in Prague 1997, p. 532, ISBN 80-7035-142-X
- Ian Hazlett (ed.), Early Christianity: the origins and development of the church to 600. Centre for the Study of Democracy and Culture Brno 2009, ISBN 978-807325-159-8
- Antonín Friedl, Mikuláš Wurmser, Master of Royal Portraits at Karlštejn, SNKLHU Prague 1956
