= Jeroen Phaff =

Dutch musical theatre actor

Jeroen Phaff, b. 1965 in Wormerveer (the Netherlands), is a Dutch musical artist.

Musicals:

- L'Histoire du Soldat: playing Ramus and Igor Stravinsky
- de Nachtegaal: playing Theo Loevendie
- The Phantom of the Opera: playing Raoul
- Evita: playing Juan Perón
- Les Misérables: playing Bishop Lesgles and ansamble
- Dance of the Vampires: playing count Krolock in Vienna
- Elisabeth: playing Emperor Franz Josef
- De Griezelbus: playing Lucifer
- Aida: playing Zoser
- The Flying Dutchman: playing Willem van der Decken
- The Lion King: playing Scar and Pumba
- Jesus Christ Superstar: playing Pontius Pilate
- The Wiz: playing the lion
- Chess: playing Anatoly Sergievsky
- Tarzan: Korchak

In 2002 Jeroen won the John Kraaijkamp musical award for best male part. He came third in the 1995 Dutch talent show A Star Is Born.
