= Girolamo della Volpaia =

Italian inventor

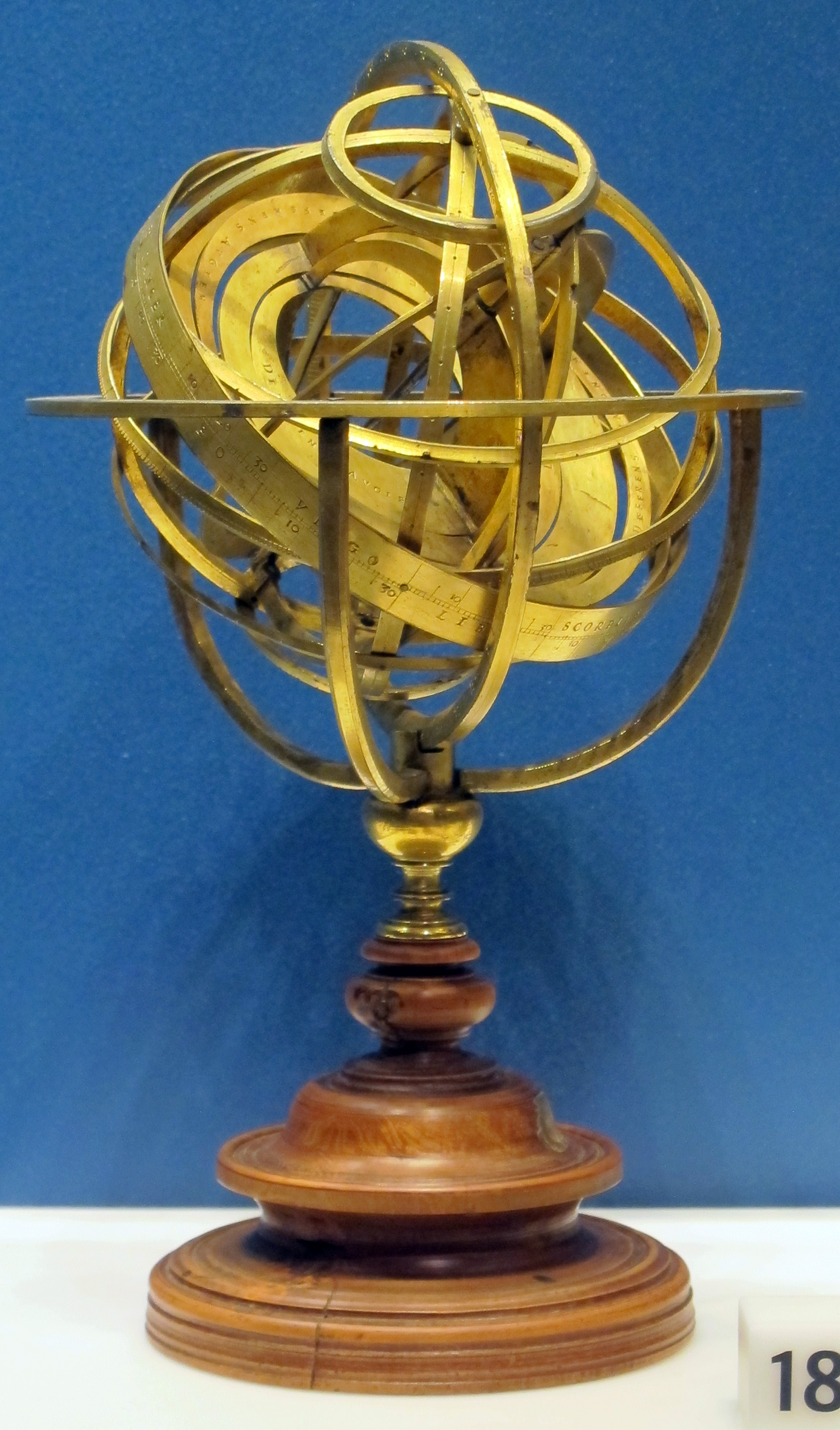
Armillary sphere, 1557

Girolamo della Volpaia (ca. 1530 – 1614) was an Italian maker of clocks and scientific instruments from Volpaia.

Girolamo continued the business of his father Camillo della Volpaia (1484-1560) and his uncles Benvenuto della Volpaia (1486-1532) and Eufrosino della Volpaia (late 15th century - 16th century), who were an important family of engineers and clockmakers in Tuscany. In 1554, he made an armillary sphere, now preserved in the Science Museum in London. In 1560, he succeeded his father as superintendent of the large clock in the Palazzo Vecchio. He also asked to be assigned the maintenance of his grandfather Lorenzo's (1446-1512) Orologio dei Pianeti [Planetary Clock], which he restored himself. In 1564, he designed a clock for the Piazza San Marco in Venice. In 1590, he built his last clock, preserved at the Museo Galileo of Florence (inv. 2460).

== See also ==
- Lorenzo della Volpaia (grandfather of Girolamo della Volpaia)
