= Saint Jerome (Tura) =

Painting by Cosmè Tura

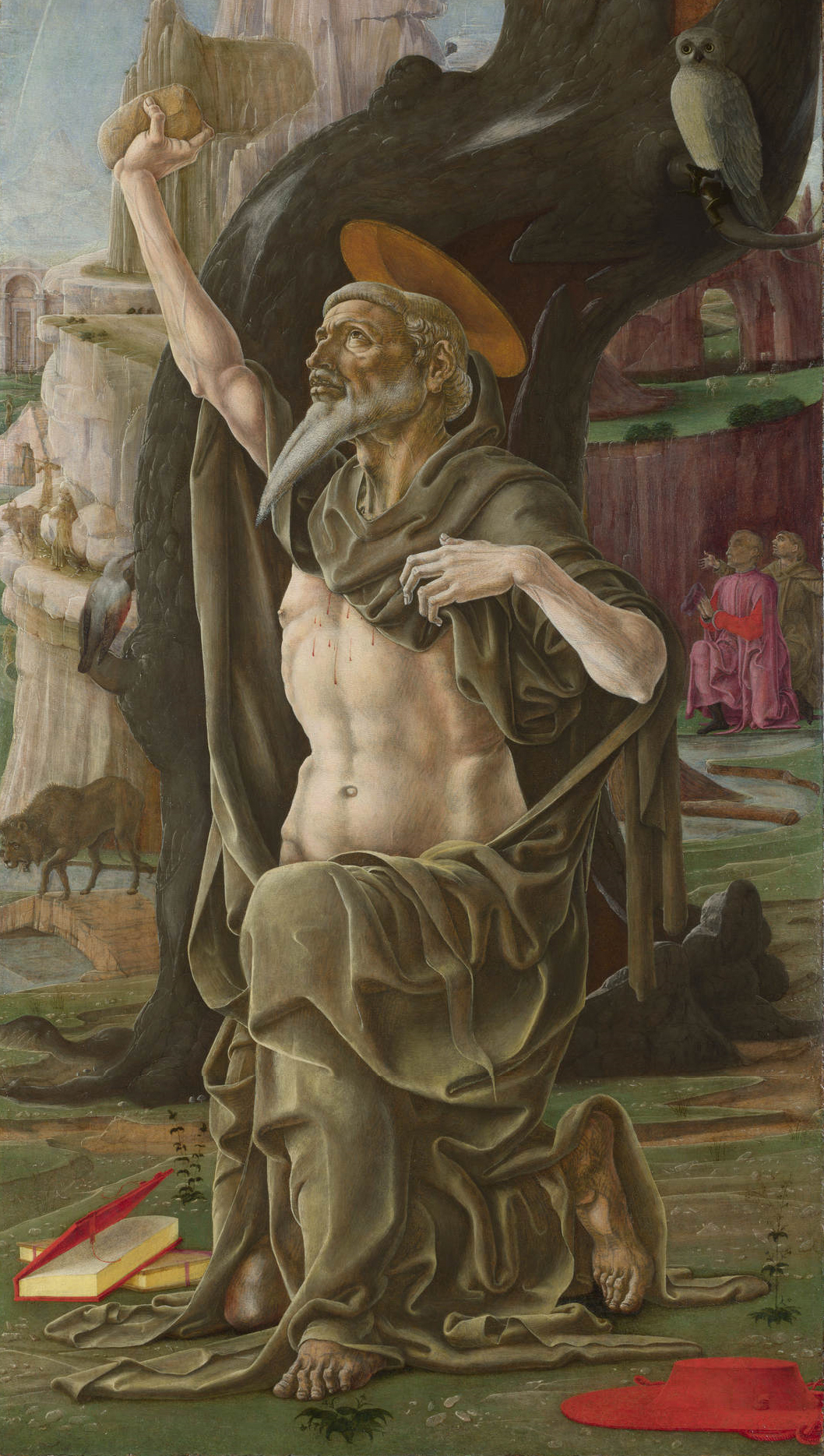
- Artist: Cosmè Tura
- Year: Probably c. 1470
- Medium: Oil and egg on poplar
- Dimensions: 100 cm × 57 cm (39 in × 22 in)
- Location: National Gallery, London

Saint Jerome is a painting in oil and tempera on panel by Cosmè Tura, probably from around 1470, which has been in the National Gallery in London since 1867.

The work is recorded in the Constabili collection and appears in an 1851 inventory of the Barbi Cinti collection in Ferrara, where it is related to a fragment of the Crucified Christ by the same artist which at that time was in the same collection. Now in the Pinacoteca di Brera in Milan, the fragment formed part of the top-left of the Saint Jerome, which was later cut down, and depicted a vision seen by the Franciscan in the right background in which the friar received the stigmata. By 1903 the fragment was owned by the art dealer Giuseppe Guetta, from whom it was acquired by its present owner at the suggestion of Adolfo Venturi.

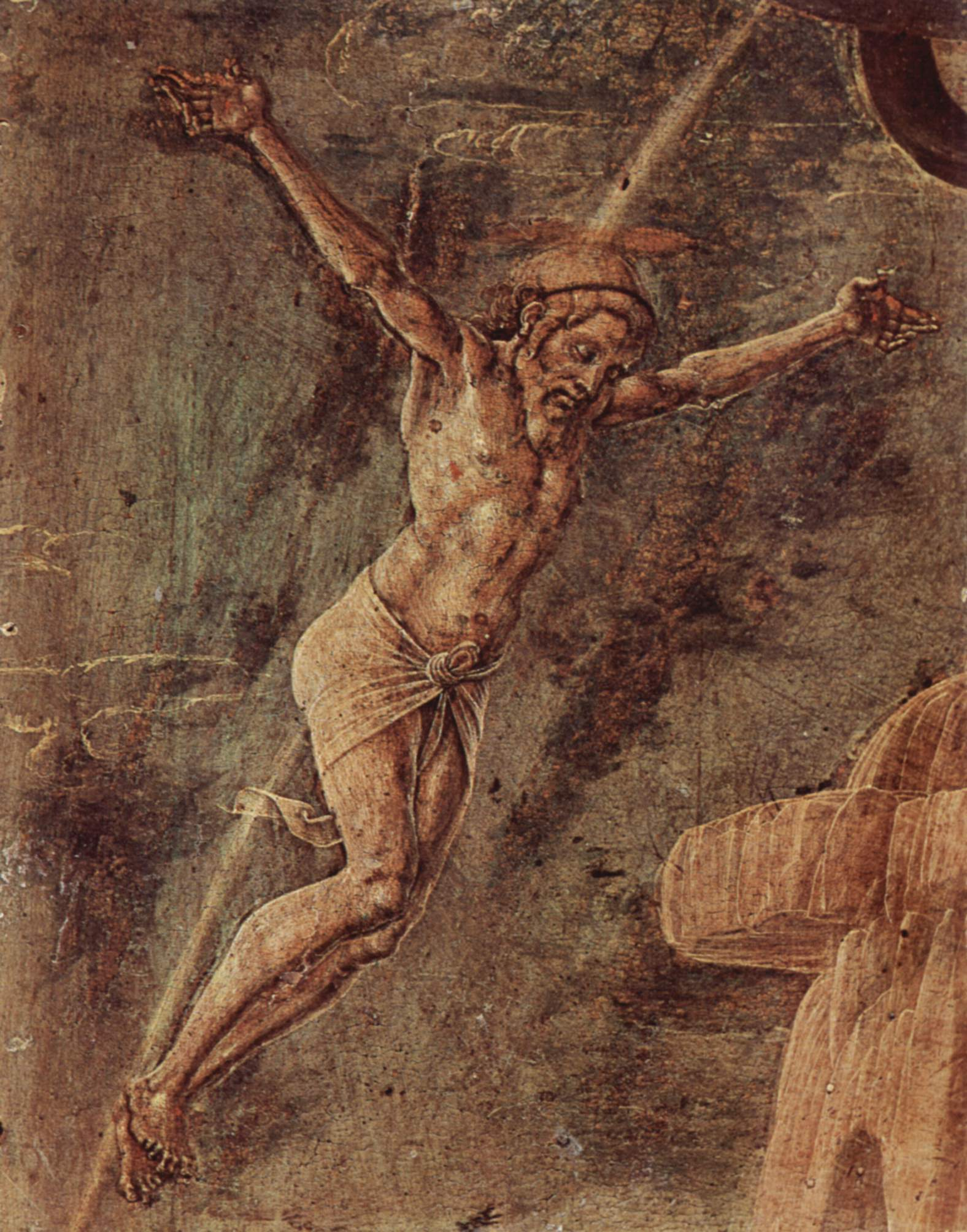
The fragment in Milan
