= Jeronimo (singer) =

Dutch singer and actor (born 1990)

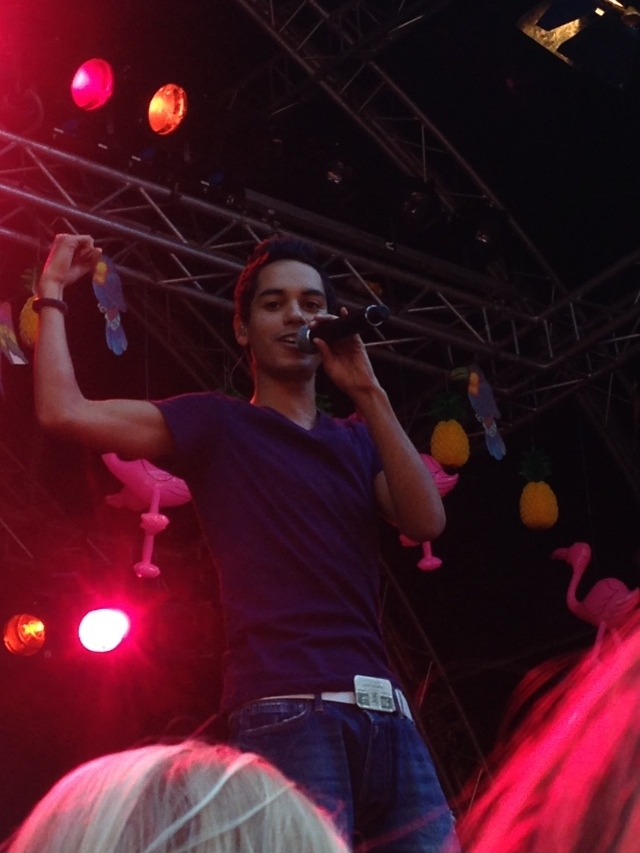
- Jeronimo performing during a concert in January 2014

Background information
- Also known as: Jeronimo; Jeronimo DaSilva
- Born: Jeronimo van Ballegoijen; 6 February 1990 (age 36); São Paulo, Brazil
- Origin: Netherlands
- Genres: Pop
- Occupations: Singer, actor
- Years active: 2007–present
- Website: jeronimomusic.net

Jeronimo van Ballegoijen (born 6 February 1990), better known by his stage names Jeronimo and Jeronimo DaSilva, is a Dutch pop singer and actor. He sings in both English and Dutch. He uses the mononym Jeronimo in his musical releases but continues to use his full name or his other stage name in his acting credits.

== Early life ==
Born in Brazil in a family of nine other siblings with him being the 10th child, Jeronimo was adopted by a Dutch family who brought him to the Netherlands. His new family had three biological children of their own and one adopted daughter from Sri Lanka. At age 10, his new parents divorced and he had to move to Sri Lanka with his mother and sister. On his return to the Netherlands, he enrolled in a high school with a musical program. This landed him an acting and singing role in the 2007 coming-of-age film Timboektoe, where he sings "I Could Have Loved You", produced and recorded by the band members of Relax.

== Career ==
In 2011, "I Am No Superman" featuring rapper Stacey "Stay-C" Seedorf was his chart-topping debut in the Netherlands that reached No. 11 in the Singles Top 100 list. This was followed by the 2012 album One Kiss and the successful title track hit "One Kiss" in addition to a number of charting singles. Later on in 2012, he auditioned for the 2012 Dutch Nationaal Songfestival with his song unfortunately becoming a "sacrifice" in a bid to represent the Netherlands in the 2012 Eurovision Song Contest.

His song "Gi-ga-gantisch" has been used in Efteling's Sprookjesboom de Musical. He also recorded "It's A Fun Thing" for Cartoon Network Asia Pacific, which aimed for the network's Asian market thus embarking on an Asian tour in 2013.

== Discography ==
=== Albums ===
Year	Album	Peak positions
Year	Album	NED
2012	One Kiss	51

=== Singles ===
Year	Single	Peak positions	Album
Year	Single	NED	Album
2011	"I Am No Superman" (feat. Stay-C)	11	
2011	"Somebody Who Loves Me"	35	
2012	"I Want You Baby"	59	
2012	"One Kiss"	14	
2014	"Denk Denk Denk"	59	

== Filmography ==
- 2007: Timboektoe as Brian
- 2012: Mijn vader is een detective: The Battle as Marty
