= Yakov Geronimus =

Russian mathematician

Yakov Lazarevich Geronimus, sometimes spelled J. Geronimus (Russian: Я́ков Лазаре́вич Геро́нимус; February 6, 1898, Rostov – July 17, 1984, Kharkov) was a Russian mathematician known for contributions to theoretical mechanics and the study of orthogonal polynomials. The Geronimus polynomials are named after him.
