= Jeroen Elshoff =

Dutch football commentator and sports columnist

- Born: Jeroen Elshoff; 2 February 1977 (age 49); Alkmaar, the Netherlands
- Occupations: Football commentator, sports columnist
- Years active: 2004 - present

Jeroen Elshoff (born 2 February 1977) is a Dutch football commentator and sports columnist. Elshoff has been active with NOS Studio Sport since August 1, 2008 as a commentator for football matches in the Eredivisie, the top men's football competition in the Netherlands. Elshoff previously worked for Eyeworks Sport where he was often broadcast on Sport1 (previously Canal+). In 2018 Elshoff provided commentary for the World Cup Final on NOS along with Herman Kuiphof, Theo Reitsma and Frank Snoeks.

== Career ==
Elshoff studied journalism at the University of Utrecht and completed internships with RTV Rijnmond, the Leeuwarder Courant, and the Noordhollands Dagblad. After graduating he become a sports reporter with RTV Noord-Holland where he regularly covered the football clubs Ajax en AZ. He made his national debut in 2004 with RTL Nederland on a program covering German and English football presented by Wilfred Genee. Shortly afterwards he began announcing live matches on Canal+.

Elshoff began working for Eyeworks in August 2005. While with Eyeworks he often provided commentary on Sport1 for major football matches including the 2006 World Cup Final and the 2007 UEFA Cup Final between FC Sevilla and RCD Espanyol in Glasgow.

When NOS reacquired the broadcasting rights for the Eredivisie for the 2008-2009 season the company hired Elshoff to provide commentary for Eredivisie and UEFA Champions League matches. Elshoff announced many of the matches in the 2010 World Cup in South Africa on NOS.

Elshoff was one of four announcers chosen to provide commentary for the rounds following the group stage of the UEFA Euro 2012. Elshoff also announced matches for the 2014 World Cup, the UEFA Euro 2016, the 2018 World Cup, and the UEFA Euro 2021. In addition to football Elshoff provided rugby commentary on NOS until 2015.

On October 10, 2014 Elshoff debuted as commentator for the Netherlands national football team on NOS during a UEFA qualification game against Kazakhstan. Elshoff became one of the Studio Sport announcers assigned to regularly cover the national team. In 2015 Elshoff provided commentary for his first finals matchup on NOS, the Champions League Final between FC Barcelona en Juventus. In 2017 Elshoff was the announcer for the UEFA Women's Euro Final, in which the Netherlands national women's team defeated Denmark in front of over 4 million television viewers.

Since 2016 Elshoff has also appeared as Henry Schut's sidekick in the NOS program Eredivisie op Vrijdag. Former professional Dutch football player Daniel de Ridder is also a regular guest on the show.

A fan of American sports, Elshoff writes columns on the NFL and MLB for the website SportAmerika.nl and the eponymous online magazine. He is a fan of the San Francisco Giants. Elshoff has discussed the Super Bowl on nationally-syndicated programs in the Netherlands such as De Wereld Draait Door and RTL Late Night.

== Personal life ==
Elshoff is married and has two children. In July 2021 he tested positive for COVID-19 while covering the 2021 Olympic Games in Japan. Elshoff also became involved in controversy during the 2021 Olympics after he posted a video on Instagram in which he imitated a Japanese baseball announcer. Elshoff later apologized for the incident.
