= Ben Parkinson (British Army soldier) =

Former British paratrooper, MBE (born 1984)

Ben Parkinson MBE
- Born: 31 March 1984 (age 42); Doncaster
- Military career
- Allegiance: United Kingdom
- Branch: Army
- Service years: 2000 to 2019
- Rank: Lance Bombardier
- Unit: 7 Para Royal Horse Artillery
- Conflicts: Iraq War; War in Afghanistan
- Awards: MBE

Ben Parkinson MBE (born 31 March 1984) is a British former paratrooper, veteran's campaigner and author. He is the most severely wounded soldier to survive the War in Afghanistan. Both his legs were amputated, he broke his back and suffered lasting brain damage when the Land Rover he was travelling in struck a landmine in 2006. He defied his doctors' expectations by learning to walk and talk again and regularly raises money for veterans' charities. His case forced the Ministry of Defence to significantly increase compensation payouts to wounded British soldiers.

== Early life ==
Ben Parkinson was born on the 31 March 1984 in Doncaster, South Yorkshire. He has two brothers, including a non-identical twin, Dan. Parkinson left school at 16 without any academic qualifications.

== Military career ==
Parkinson joined the Army at 16 and attended at the Army Foundation College in Harrogate. He joined 7 Para RHA, an airborne artillery regiment, in December 2001 and in 2003 he served with British forces in the US-led invasion of Iraq. He also served on a NATO peacekeeping mission in Kosovo.

On 6 September 2006, he was part of a large armoured convoy in northern Helmand province, near the town of Musa Qala, when the WMIK open-top Land Rover he was travelling in hit a suspected anti-tank mine, left over from the Soviet occupation of Afghanistan.

Parkinson was thrown out of the gun turret and landed around 15 metres from the overturned vehicle. His comrades found him unconscious and struggling to breathe. The patrol's combat medics Corporal Paul Hamnett and Corporal Matthew Oliver saved his life by performing an emergency surgical cricothyroidotomy. The procedure, at the limit of their training, involved slicing into his windpipe with a scalpel and inserting a breathing tube below the obstructions in his throat.

He was flown by RAF Chinook helicopter to the main British base at Camp Bastion where surgeons removed his spleen and amputated both his legs above the knee.

He was evacuated back to the UK and underwent multiple surgeries at Selly Oak Hospital in Birmingham before being transferred to the Royal Hospital for Neuro-disability in London and then to the Defence Medical Rehabilitation Centre at Headley Court.

He left the Army in 2019.

== Recovery ==
Parkinson was told he would never walk or talk as a result of his injuries, but he has repeatedly defied his doctors' expectations.

In June 2012, he successfully carried the Olympic flame through his home town of Doncaster and was cheered on by thousands of wellwishers as he walked on prosthetic legs.

In 2015 he underwent hyperbaric oxygen therapy at a clinic in Scotland to try to repair his brain damage.

== Charity work ==
He is an ambassador for the Curtis Palmer Program Charity, which supports military veterans and serving and retired police officers and staff. He regularly takes part in their fundraising events and sometimes extreme expeditions. He has recently become the first double amputee to cross the Hardangervidda on an expedition with the charity, retracing the route of the "Heroes of Telemark."

He volunteers as a remembrance poppy seller in Doncaster to raise money for the Royal British Legion and also supports Help for Heroes.

== Author ==
In 2021, Parkinson released an autobiography Losing the Battle, Winning the War: How we can all defy the odds we're given. It was described as a "reflection of what heroism really means."

== Awards ==
In 2008 he won The Sun newspaper's Overcoming Adversity award at its inaugural Millies ceremony in London. He was presented the award by former Top Gear presenter Jeremy Clarkson.

In 2013 he was appointed an MBE by Prince Charles in recognition of his charity work.

== Bibliography ==
- Parkinson, Ben (2021). Losing the Battle, Winning the War. London: Hachette. ISBN 978-0-7515-8024-2.
