= San Girolamo =

San Girolamo may refer to:

- San Girolamo, Italian for Saint Jerome
- Marconi-San Girolamo-Fesca, quarter of Bari, region of Apulia, Italy
- San Girolamo, Cremona, a 17th-century, Baroque style, Roman Catholic church in Cremona, region of Lombardy, Italy
- San Girolamo, Reggio Emilia, a Baroque Roman Catholic church in central Reggio Emilia, Italy
- San Girolamo, Cingoli, a Gothic-style, Roman Catholic church of Cingoli, province of Macerata, region of Marche, Italy
- Villa San Girolamo, building complex in Fiesole, Tuscany, Italy
- San Girolamo in Campansi, former convent of Siena, region of Tuscany, Italy
- San Girolamo a Corviale, church in Rome
