= San Jerónimo =

San Jerónimo (the Spanish name of Saint Jerome) may refer to the following:

== Argentina ==
- San Jerónimo del Sauce, Las Colonias Department, Santa Fe
- San Jerónimo Department, Santa Fe
- San Jerónimo Norte, Las Colonias Department, Santa Fe
- San Jerónimo Sud, San Lorenzo Department, Santa Fe

== Colombia ==
- San Jerónimo, Antioquia

== Guatemala ==
- San Jerónimo, Baja Verapaz

== Honduras ==
- San Jerónimo, Comayagua
- San Jerónimo, Copán

== Mexico ==
- San Jerónimo Lídice, a neighborhood of Mexico City
- San Jerónimo, Chihuahua
- San Jerónimo, Guanajuato
- San Jerónimo (Los Barbosa), Jalisco
- San Jerónimo, Zacatecas
- San Jerónimo Coatlán, Oaxaca
- San Jerónimo de Juárez, Guerrero
- San Jerónimo Silacayoapilla, Oaxaca
- San Jerónimo Sosola, Oaxaca
- San Jerónimo Taviche, Oaxaca
- San Jerónimo Tecoatl, Oaxaca
- San Jerónimo Tlacochahuaya, Oaxaca
- San Jerónimo Tecuanipan, Puebla
- San Jerónimo Xayacatlán, Puebla
- San Jerónimo River, a tributary of the Balsas River

== Peru ==
- San Jerónimo District (disambiguation), several districts in Peru

== Spain ==
- San Jeronimo el Real (Royal Church, Madrid)

== See also ==
- San Geronimo (disambiguation)
