= San Geronimo =

San Geronimo or San Gerónimo may refer to:

== Places ==
=== Argentina ===
- San Gerónimo, San Luis, a village in central Argentina

=== Bolivia ===
- San Geronimo River

=== Chile ===
- San Gerónimo Aerodrome, an airport near Algarrobo, Valparaiso

=== Dominican Republic ===
- San Gerónimo (Distrito Nacional), a sector in the city of Santo Domingo

=== United States ===
- San Geronimo Creek, a creek in northern California
- San Geronimo Valley, a valley in northern California
- San Geronimo, California, an unincorporated community north of San Francisco
- Fortín de San Gerónimo, a fort in San Juan, Puerto Rico
- Rancho San Geronimo (Cacho), a Mexican land grant in present-day Marin County, California
- Rancho San Geronimo (Villavicencio), a Mexican land grant in present-day San Luis Obispo County, California

== People ==
- Geronimo (martyr), an Arab Catholic saint

== See also ==
- San Jerónimo (disambiguation)
