= 2002 Vuelta a Murcia =

Race details
- Dates: 6–10 March 2002
- Stages: 5
- Distance: 703.8 km (437.3 mi)
- Winning time: 16h 49' 36"

Results
	Winner	Víctor Hugo Peña (COL)
	Second	Jan Hruška (CZE)
	Third	Oscar Camenzind (SUI)

The 2002 Vuelta a Murcia was the 18th professional edition of the Vuelta a Murcia cycle race and was held on 6 March to 10 March 2002. The race started and finished in Murcia. The race was won by Víctor Hugo Peña.

== General classification ==
Final general classification

Rank	Rider	Time
1	Víctor Hugo Peña (COL)	16h 49' 36"
2	Jan Hruška (CZE)	+ 5"
3	Oscar Camenzind (SUI)	+ 10"
4	Grischa Niermann (GER)	+ 11"
5	Levi Leipheimer (USA)	+ 14"
6	Javier Pascual Llorente (ESP)	+ 16"
7	Danilo Di Luca (ITA)	+ 17"
8	Claus Michael Møller (DEN)	+ 18"
9	Gabriele Missaglia (ITA)	+ 25"
10	Ángel Edo (ESP)	+ 26"
