= 2007 Vuelta a Castilla y León =

Race details
- Dates: 26 March–30 March 2007
- Stages: 5
- Distance: 631 km (392.1 mi)
- Winning time: 15h 04' 15"

Results
	Winner	Alberto Contador (ESP)
	Second	Koldo Gil (ESP)
	Third	Juan José Cobo (ESP)

The 2007 Vuelta a Castilla y León was the 22nd edition of the Vuelta a Castilla y León cycle race and was held on 26 March to 30 March 2007. The race started in Zamora and finished in Soria. The race was won by Alberto Contador.

== Teams ==
Sixteen teams of up to eight riders started the race:

- Discovery Channel
- Team CSC
- Rabobank
- Liquigas
- Agritubel
- Caisse d'Epargne
- Euskaltel–Euskadi
- Saunier Duval–Prodir
- Relax–GAM
- Grupo Nicolás Mateos
- Viña Magna–Cropu
- Orbea–Oreka SDA
- Andalucía–Cajasur
- Benfica
- Karpin–Galicia
- Fuerteventura–Canarias

== General classification ==
Final general classification

Rank	Rider	Time
1	Alberto Contador (ESP)	15h 04' 15"
2	Koldo Gil (ESP)	+ 36"
3	Juan José Cobo (ESP)	+ 46"
4	Igor Antón (ESP)	+ 48"
5	Óscar Sevilla (ESP)	+ 55"
6	David López (ESP)	+ 58"
7	Jan Hruška (CZE)	+ 1' 05"
8	Julián Sánchez (ESP)	+ 1' 06"
9	Manuel Beltrán (ESP)	+ 1' 13"
10	Francisco Ventoso (ESP)	+ 1' 18"
