= Jan Hruška =

Czech cyclist (born 1975)

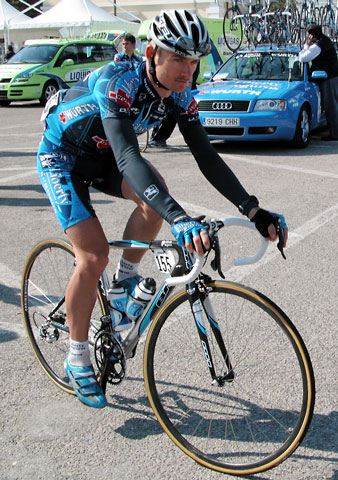

Personal information
- Full name: Jan Hruška
- Born: 4 February 1975 (age 51) Uničov, Czechoslovakia

Cycling career
- Sport: Cycling
- Current team: Retired
- Role: Rider

Professional teams
- 1996: Husqvarna – Z.V.V.Z.
- 1997: ZVVZ – Giant – AIS
- 1998–1999: ZVVZ–DLD
- 2000: Vitalicio Seguros
- 2001–2005: ONCE–Eroski
- 2006: 3 Molinos Resort
- 2007: Relax–GAM

Major wins
- Grand Tours Giro d'Italia 2 individual stages (2000) Vuelta a España 1 TTT stage (2003)

Jan Hruška (born 4 February 1975) is a former professional road bicycle racer from the Czech Republic, who turned professional in 1996.

== Doping ==
Hruška entered the 2000 Summer Olympics, but was removed after testing for a doping product.

== Major results ==
1996
10th Overall Peace Race
1997
10th Overall Hofbräu Cup
1998
3rd Time trial, National Road Championships
6th Overall Herald Sun Tour
1999
1st Time trial, National Road Championships
2nd Overall Vuelta a Rioja
2nd Overall Tour de Beauce
3rd Overall Herald Sun Tour

1st Stage 5

4th Overall Peace Race
2000
Giro d'Italia

1st Prologue & Stage 20 (ITT)
Held after Prologue

2nd Overall Tirreno–Adriatico
2002
1st Stage 5 Volta ao Algarve
2nd Overall Vuelta a Murcia
3rd Circuito de Getxo
8th Overall Tirreno–Adriatico
9th Overall Circuit Cycliste de la Sarthe
2003
1st Stage 3 (ITT) Vuelta a Rioja
Vuelta a España

1st Stage 1 (TTT)
Held after Stage 1

1st Stage 1 (TTT) Volta a Catalunya
2nd Overall Vuelta a Murcia
2004
3rd Overall Deutschland Tour
6th Overall Vuelta a Aragón
9th Overall Vuelta a Castilla y León
2005
7th Overall Tour de Pologne
2006
1st Overall Clásica Internacional de Alcobendas

1st Points classification
1st Stage 3 (ITT)

4th Overall Vuelta a Murcia
5th Overall Volta ao Distrito de Santarém
2007
7th Overall Vuelta a Castilla y León
9th Overall Volta ao Alentejo
2008
2nd Time trial, National Road Championships

== See also ==
- List of doping cases in cycling
- List of sportspeople sanctioned for doping offences
