= Carlos Castaño =

Carlos Castaño may refer to:

- Carlos Castaño Gil (1965–2004), founder of the Peasant Self-Defense Forces of Córdoba and Urabá (ACCU), an extreme right paramilitary organization in Colombia
- Carlos Castaño Panadero (born 1979), Spanish Olympic cyclist
- Carlos Castaño (karate), Dominican Republic karateka
