= 2000 Vuelta a Murcia =

Race details
- Dates: 1–5 March 2000
- Stages: 5
- Distance: 711.1 km (441.9 mi)
- Winning time: 18h 09' 31"

Results
	Winner	David Cañada (ESP)
	Second	Javier Pascual Llorente (ESP)
	Third	José Alberto Martínez (ESP)

The 2000 Vuelta a Murcia was the 16th professional edition of the Vuelta a Murcia cycle race and was held on 1 March 2000. The race started and finished in Murcia. The race was won by David Cañada.

== General classification ==
Final general classification

Rank	Rider	Time
1	David Cañada (ESP)	18h 09' 31"
2	Javier Pascual Llorente (ESP)	+ 48"
3	José Alberto Martínez (ESP)	+ 1' 09"
4	Alberto Elli (ITA)	+ 1' 27"
5	Raivis Belohvoščiks (LAT)	+ 4' 03"
6	Francisco Cabello (ESP)	+ 4' 08"
7	Marcelino Garcia (ESP)	+ 4' 10"
8	Miguel Ángel Peña (ESP)	+ 4' 19"
9	Andrei Zintchenko (RUS)	+ 4' 26"
10	Dave Bruylandts (BEL)	+ 4' 32"
