= 2003 Vuelta a Murcia =

Race details
- Dates: 5–9 March 2003
- Stages: 5
- Distance: 656.4 km (407.9 mi)
- Winning time: 15h 58' 18"

Results
	Winner	Javier Pascual Llorente (ESP)
	Second	Jan Hruška (CZE)
	Third	Haimar Zubeldia (ESP)

The 2003 Vuelta a Murcia was the 19th professional edition of the Vuelta a Murcia cycle race and was held on 5 March to 9 March 2003. The race started and finished in Murcia. The race was won by Javier Pascual Llorente.

== General classification ==
Final general classification

Rank	Rider	Time
1	Javier Pascual Llorente (ESP)	15h 58' 18"
2	Jan Hruška (CZE)	+ 17"
3	Haimar Zubeldia (ESP)	+ 23"
4	Iván Gutiérrez (ESP)	+ 40"
5	Juan Carlos Domínguez (ESP)	+ 47"
6	Víctor Hugo Peña (COL)	+ 49"
7	Beat Zberg (SUI)	+ 1' 00"
8	Cadel Evans (AUS)	+ 1' 00"
9	José Luis Martínez (ESP)	+ 1' 08"
10	Addy Engels (NED)	+ 1' 22"
