= Vuelta a Murcia =

Spanish multi-day road cycling race

Race details
- Date: Mid-February
- Region: Region of Murcia, Spain
- English name: Tour of Murcia
- Local name: Vuelta Ciclistica a la Region di Murcia
- Discipline: Road race
- Competition: UCI Europe Tour
- Type: Stage race (until 2012, 2019–2020); One-day race (2013–2018, 2021–24)
- Web site: www.vueltamurcia.es

History
- First edition: 1981
- Editions: 45 (as of 2026)
- First winner: Pedro Delgado (ESP)
- Most wins: Alejandro Valverde (ESP) (5 wins)
- Most recent: Fabio Christen (SUI)

The Vuelta Ciclista a Murcia (English: Tour of Murcia) is a road bicycle race held in and around Murcia, Spain. The first four editions were reserved to amateurs. Originally the race was held in early March and consisted of five stages. However, due to Spain's financial turmoil, the race was scaled back to three stages in 2011 and two stages in 2012. From 2013 to 2018 the Vuelta a Murcia was organised as a single-day race and shifted to mid-February on the international calendar. In 2019 the race was expanded to two stages. It is part of the UCI Europe Tour as a 2.1 event. However, due to the postponement of the 2021 edition to May, the race was reverted to its one-day nature, with the expectation that the race will continue as a two-day event in future editions.

== Controversies ==
All Italian teams were banned from taking part in the 2010 edition of the race by race organizers. This decision was made due to the banning of Spanish cyclist Alejandro Valverde by the Italian Olympic Committee due to his links with the Operación Puerto blood doping ring.

In 2011 Alberto Contador won both the overall and points classification after winning Stage 2 and the Stage 3 individual time trial. However, in February 2012 he was suspended and all his results after July 2010 were voided, awarding Jérôme Coppel of Saur Sojasun the overall victory.

== Past winners – men's race ==
Year	Country	Rider	Team
1981	Spain	Pedro Delgado	
1982	Spain	Salvador Sanchis	
1983	Spain	Francisco Javier Cedena	
1984	Spain	Ricardo Martinez	
1985	Spain	José Recio	Kelme
1986	Spain	Miguel Induráin	Reynolds
1987	Spain	Pello Ruiz Cabestany	Caja Rural–Seat
1988	Spain	Carlos Hernández	Teka
1989	Spain	Marino Alonso	Teka
1990	Netherlands	Tom Cordes	Buckler–Colnago–Decca
1991	Spain	José Luis Villanueva	ONCE
1992	Colombia	Álvaro Mejía	Postobón
1993	Spain	Carlos Galarreta	Deportpublic
1994	Spain	Melcior Mauri	Banesto
1995	Italy	Adriano Baffi	Mapei–GB
1996	Spain	Melcior Mauri	ONCE
1997	Spain	Juan Carlos Domínguez	Kelme–Costa Blanca
1998	Italy	Alberto Elli	Casino–Ag2r
1999	Italy	Marco Pantani	Mercatone Uno–Bianchi
2000	Spain	David Cañada	ONCE–Deutsche Bank
2001	Spain	Aitor González	Kelme–Costa Blanca
2002	Colombia	Víctor Hugo Peña	U.S. Postal Service
2003	Spain	Javier Pascual Llorente	Kelme–Costa Blanca
2004	Spain	Alejandro Valverde	Comunidad Valenciana-Kelme
2005	Spain	Koldo Gil	Liberty Seguros–Würth
2006	Spain	José Iván Gutiérrez	Caisse d'Epargne–Illes Balears
2007	Spain	Alejandro Valverde	Caisse d'Epargne
2008	Spain	Alejandro Valverde	Caisse d'Epargne
2009	Russia	Denis Menchov	Rabobank
2010	Czech Republic	František Raboň	Team HTC–Columbia
2011	France	Jérôme Coppel	Saur–Sojasun
2012	Colombia	Nairo Quintana	Movistar Team
2013	Spain	Daniel Navarro	Cofidis
2014	Spain	Alejandro Valverde	Movistar Team
2015	Estonia	Rein Taaramäe	Astana
2016	Belgium	Philippe Gilbert	BMC Racing Team
2017	Spain	Alejandro Valverde	Movistar Team
2018	Spain	Luis León Sánchez	Astana
2019	Spain	Luis León Sánchez	Astana
2020	Belgium	Xandro Meurisse	Circus–Wanty Gobert
2021	Spain	Antonio Jesús Soto	Euskaltel–Euskadi
2022	Italy	Alessandro Covi	UAE Team Emirates
2023	Great Britain	Ben Turner	INEOS Grenadiers
2024	Australia	Ben O'Connor	Decathlon–AG2R La Mondiale
2025	Switzerland	Fabio Christen	Q36.5 Pro Cycling Team
2026		Not awarded	

== Past winners – women's race ==
Year	Country	Rider	Team
2018	Spain	Gloria Rodriguez	Movistar Team
