= 2001 Vuelta a Murcia =

Race details
- Dates: 7–11 March 2001
- Stages: 5
- Distance: 640.1 km (397.7 mi)
- Winning time: 15h 52' 40"

Results
	Winner	Aitor González (ESP)
	Second	Javier Pascual Llorente (ESP)
	Third	Mikel Zarrabeitia (ESP)

The 2001 Vuelta a Murcia was the 17th professional edition of the Vuelta a Murcia cycle race and was held on 7 March to 11 March 2001. The race started and finished in Murcia. The race was won by Aitor González.

== General classification ==
Final general classification

Rank	Rider	Time
1	Aitor González (ESP)	15h 52' 40"
2	Javier Pascual Llorente (ESP)	+ 25"
3	Mikel Zarrabeitia (ESP)	+ 36"
4	Gabriele Colombo (ITA)	+ 41"
5	Francisco Cabello (ESP)	+ 46"
6	Óscar Laguna (ESP)	+ 58"
7	Juan Carlos Domínguez (ESP)	+ 1' 01"
8	Alexandr Shefer (KAZ)	+ 1' 30"
9	Paolo Lanfranchi (ITA)	+ 1' 49"
10	José Luis Rubiera (ESP)	+ 1' 52"
