= Koldo Gil =

Spanish cyclist

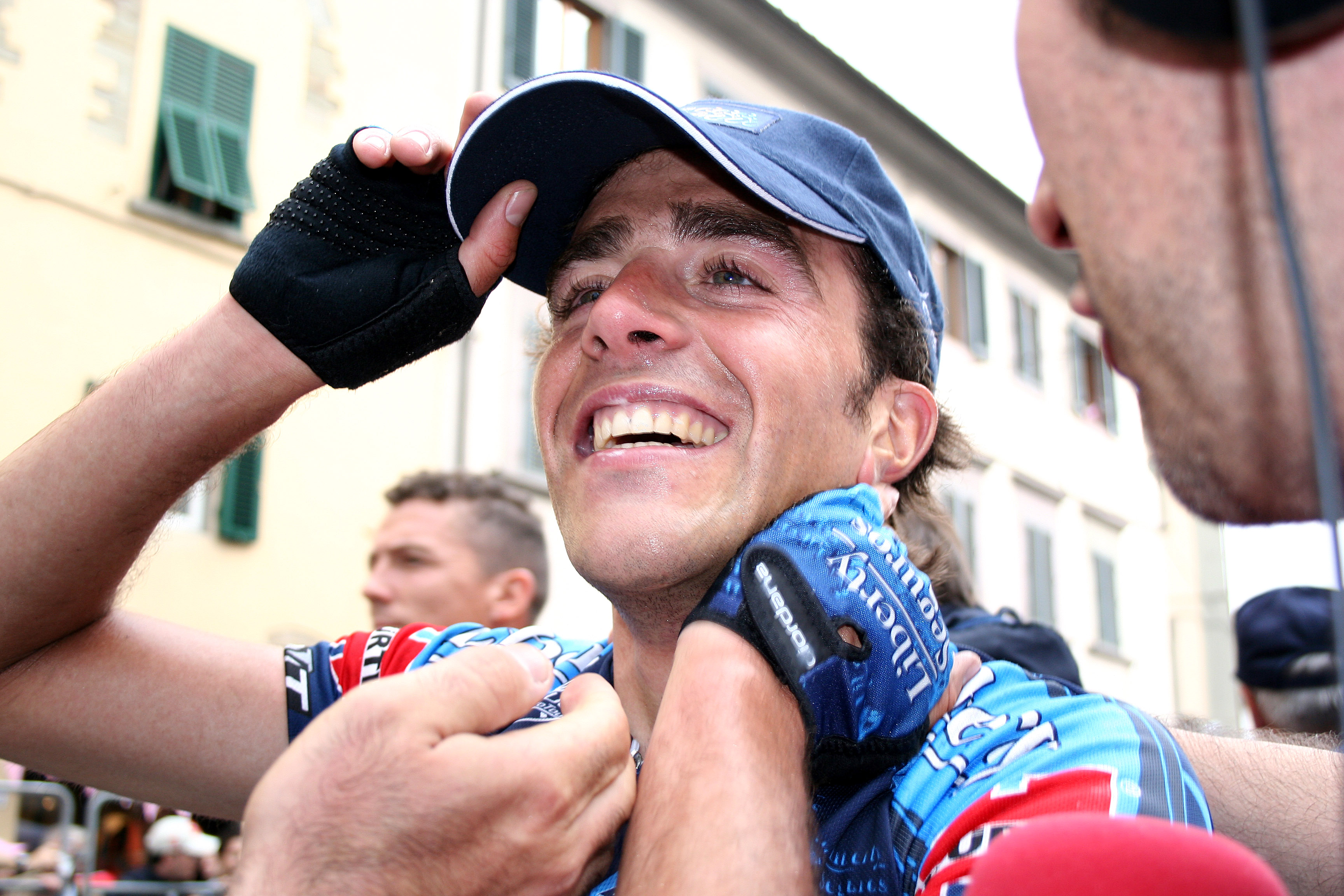

Personal information
- Full name: Koldo Gil Pérez
- Born: 16 January 1978 (age 48) Burlada, Spain
- Height: 1.73 m (5 ft 8 in)
- Weight: 60 kg (132 lb)

Cycling career
- Sport: Cycling
- Current team: Retired
- Discipline: Road
- Role: Rider

Amateur teams
- 1998–1999: Banesto Amateur
- 2000: Vitoria–Banesto
- 2000: Banesto (stagiaire)

Professional teams
- 2001–2002: iBanesto.com
- 2003–2005: ONCE–Eroski
- 2006–2007: Saunier Duval–Prodir
- 2008: Liberty Seguros

Major wins
- Grand Tours Giro d'Italia 1 individual stage (2005)

Koldo Gil Pérez (born 16 January 1978 in Burlata, Navarra) is a former Spanish professional road racing cyclist who last rode for the UCI Continental team Liberty Seguros Continental. His career highlights include winning a stage of the Giro d'Italia and leading the overall classification at the Tour de Suisse.

At the 2006 Tour de Suisse, Gil took stage 6 and held the leader's yellow jersey until the final stage when he was overtaken by 2004 winner Jan Ullrich in the final stage's individual time trial. He finished a disappointing second.

After Gil was unable to find a team for the 2009 season, he announced his retirement.

== Major achievements ==
2000
1st Stage 4 Vuelta a Navarra
2002
8th Overall Route du Sud
9th Overall Vuelta a La Rioja

1st Stage 3

9th Clásica a los Puertos de Guadarrama
2003
3rd Overall Volta a Catalunya

1st Stage 1 (TTT)

2004
1st Overall Vuelta a Castilla y León
4th Overall Euskal Bizikleta
4th Overall Vuelta a Aragón
5th Trofeo Manacor
6th Overall Setmana Catalana de Ciclisme
8th Overall Vuelta a la Comunidad Valenciana
8th Klasika Primavera
9th Overall Tour of the Basque Country
2005
1st Overall Vuelta a Murcia

1st Mountains classification

1st Stage 7 Giro d'Italia
5th Overall Setmana Catalana de Ciclisme
6th Overall Tour de Suisse
2006
1st Overall Euskal Bizikleta

1st Stages 1 & 4b

2nd Overall Tour de Suisse

1st Stage 6

3rd GP Llodio
8th La Flèche Wallonne
2007
1st Overall Vuelta Asturias
1st Subida al Naranco
2nd Overall Vuelta a Castilla y León
4th Overall Vuelta a Murcia
10th Overall Tour of the Basque Country
2008
2nd Subida al Naranco
4th Overall Vuelta a Asturias
5th Overall Volta a Portugal
5th Overall GP Internacional Paredes Rota dos Móveis
10th Overall Troféu Joaquim Agostinho

1st Stage 3

10th GP Llodio

=== Grand Tour general classification results timeline ===
Grand Tour	2004	2005
Giro d'Italia	—	DNF
Tour de France	—	—
Vuelta a España	61	—

Legend
—	Did not compete
DNF	Did not finish
