= 2006 Tour de Suisse =

2006 UCI ProTour, race 15 of 27
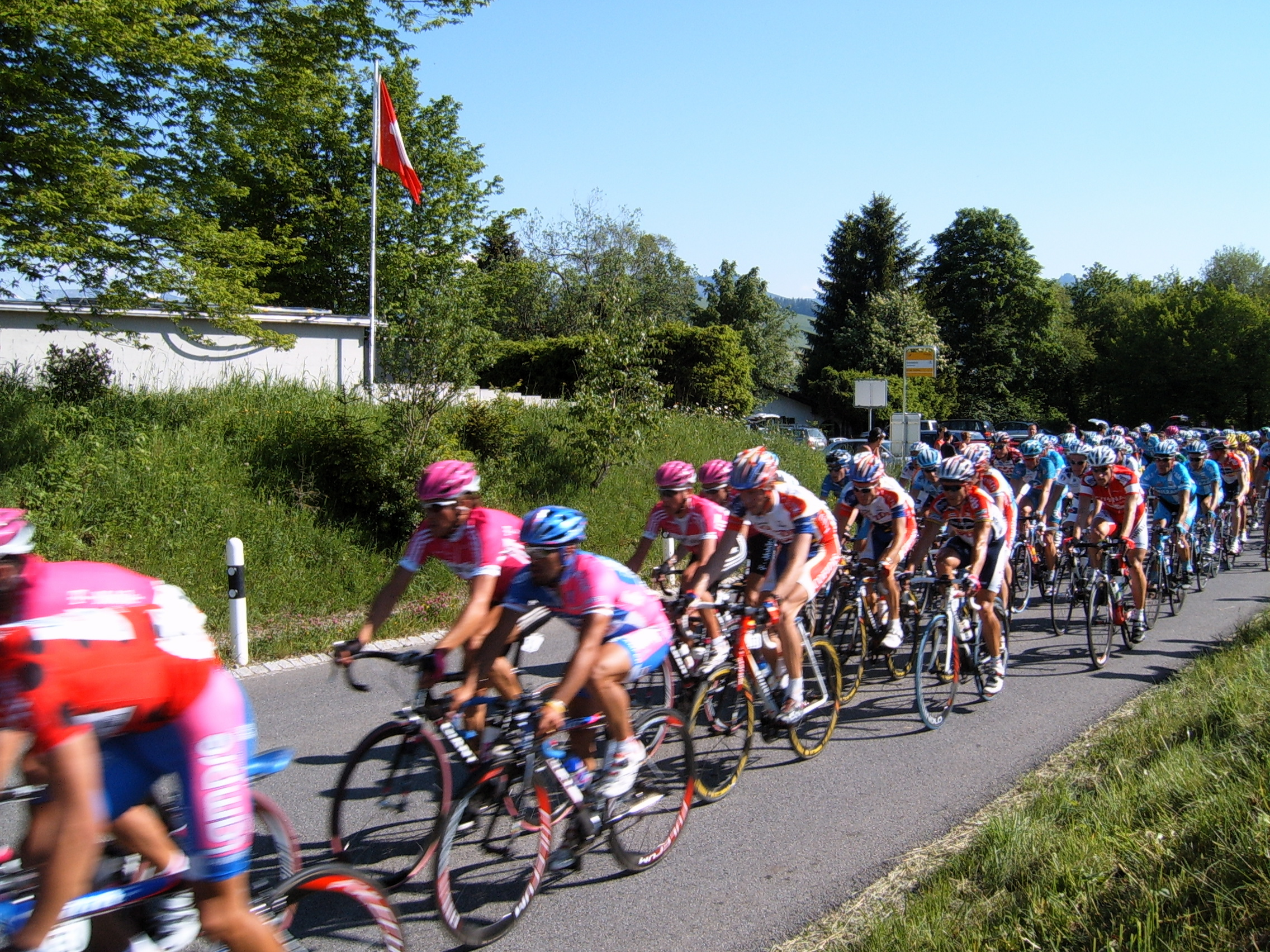
- Tour de Suisse 2006, stage 2

Race details
- Dates: 10—18 June 2006
- Stages: 9
- Distance: 1,468 km (912 mi)
- Winning time: 38h 21' 36"

Results
Jersey awarded to the overall winner	Winner	Jan Ullrich (GER)	(T-Mobile Team)
	Second	Koldo Gil Perez (ESP)	(Saunier Duval–Prodir)
	Third	Jörg Jaksche (GER)	(Astana–Würth)
Jersey awarded to the points classification winner	Points	Daniele Bennati (ITA)	(Lampre–Fondital)
Jersey awarded to the mountains classification winner	Mountains	Michael Albasini (SUI)	(Liquigas)
Jersey awarded to the sprints classification winner	Sprints	Michael Albasini (SUI)	(Liquigas)
	Team	Astana–Würth	

The 2006 Tour de Suisse was the 70th edition of the Tour de Suisse road cycling stage race, which took place from 10 to 18 June 2006. The race consisted of nine stages, covering a total of 1,468 km (912 mi), starting in Baden and finishing in Bern.

2004 champion Jan Ullrich (T-Mobile Team) overcame a 50-second deficit on the final stage to win the overall title and the yellow jersey, in what became the last race of his career. Koldo Gil and Jörg Jaksche finished second and third, respectively, to complete the podium. In February 2012 Ulrich was found guilty of a doping offence by the Court of Arbitration for Sport. In consequence all his results gained since May 2005 were removed from his Palmares, including this one. The official website of the race however still states Ullrich as the winner of 2006.

Daniele Bennati (Lampre–Fondital) won the points classification as the most consistent finisher. Astana-Würth Cycling Team captured the team classification while Michael Albasini (Liquigas) captured the King of the Mountains and the intermediate sprints jerseys.

== Teams ==
Twenty-one teams of eight riders started the race:

- Euskaltel–Euskadi
- Team CSC
- Phonak
- T-Mobile Team
- Caisse d'Epargne–Illes Balears
- Lampre–Fondital
- Rabobank
- Würth
- Discovery Channel
- Davitamon–Lotto
- Quick-Step–Innergetic
- Gerolsteiner
- Saunier Duval–Prodir
- Cofidis
- Team Milram
- Crédit Agricole
- Liquigas
- Française des Jeux
- Bouygues Télécom
- AG2R Prévoyance
- Team LPR

== Route ==
Stage characteristics and winners
Stage	Date	Course	Distance	Type	Winner
1	10 June	Baden to Baden	154 km (95.7 mi)	Flat stage	Tom Boonen (BEL)
2	11 June	Bremgarten to Einsiedeln	155.6 km (96.7 mi)	Flat stage	Daniele Contrini (ITA)
3	12 June	Einsiedeln to Arlesheim	160 km (99.4 mi)	Hilly stage	Nick Nuyens (BEL)
4	13 June	Niederbipp to La Chaux-de-Fonds	161.3 km (100.2 mi)	Hilly stage	Ángel Vicioso (ESP)
5	14 June	La Chaux-de-Fonds to Leukerbad	229.5 km (142.6 mi)	Medium mountain stage	Steve Morabito (SUI)
6	15 June	Fiesch to La Punt	212.2 km (131.9 mi)	Mountain stage	Koldo Gil (ESP)
7	16 June	St. Moritz to Ascona	233.7 km (145.2 mi)	Mountain stage	Óscar Freire (ESP)
8	17 June	Ambrì to Ambrì	166.3 km (103.3 mi)	Mountain stage	Alberto Contador (ESP)
9	18 June	Kerzers to Bern	30.7 km (19.1 mi)	Individual time trial	~~Jan Ullrich (GER)~~

== Stages ==
=== Stage 1 ===
10 June – Baden to Baden, 154 km (96 mi)

Stage 1 result

Rank	Rider	Team	Time
1	Tom Boonen (BEL)	Quick-Step–Innergetic	3h 51' 14"
2	Daniele Bennati (ITA)	Lampre–Fondital	s.t.
3	Óscar Freire (ESP)	Rabobank	s.t.

General Classification after Stage 1

Rank	Rider	Team	Time
1	Tom Boonen (BEL)	Quick-Step–Innergetic	3h 51' 04"
2	Daniele Bennati (ITA)	Lampre–Fondital	+ 4"
3	Michael Albasini (SUI)	Liquigas	+ 5"

=== Stage 2 ===
11 June – Bremgarten to Einsiedeln, 165 km (103 mi)

Stage 2 result

Rank	Rider	Team	Time
1	Daniele Contrini (ITA)	Team LPR	3h 57' 08"
2	Daniele Bennati (ITA)	Lampre–Fondital	+ 5' 02"
3	Erik Zabel (GER)	Team Milram	+ 5' 02"

General Classification after Stage 2

Rank	Rider	Team	Time
1	Daniele Bennati (ITA)	Lampre–Fondital	7h 53' 12"
2	Tom Boonen (BEL)	Quick-Step–Innergetic	+ 8"
3	Michael Albasini (SUI)	Liquigas	+ 11"

=== Stage 3 ===
12 June – Einsiedeln to Arlesheim, 160 km (99 mi)

Stage 3 result

Rank	Rider	Team	Time
1	Nick Nuyens (BEL)	Quick-Step–Innergetic	4h 36' 52"
2	Linus Gerdemann (GER)	T-Mobile Team	s.t.
3	Jörg Jaksche (GER)	Astana–Würth	s.t.

General Classification after Stage 3

Rank	Rider	Team	Time
1	Nick Nuyens (BEL)	Quick-Step–Innergetic	12h 30' 09"
2	Linus Gerdemann (GER)	T-Mobile Team	+ 5"
3	Daniele Bennati (ITA)	Lampre–Fondital	+ 6"

=== Stage 4 ===
13 June – Niederbipp to La Chaux-de-Fonds, 151 km (94 mi)

Stage 4 result

Rank	Rider	Team	Time
1	Ángel Vicioso Arcos (ESP)	Astana–Würth	3h 45' 09"
2	David Herrero Llorente (ESP)	Euskaltel–Euskadi	s.t.
3	Daniele Bennati (ITA)	Lampre–Fondital	+ 1"

General Classification after Stage 4

Rank	Rider	Team	Time
1	Nick Nuyens (BEL)	Quick-Step–Innergetic	16h 15' 19"
2	Daniele Bennati (ITA)	Quick-Step–Innergetic	+ 2"
3	Linus Gerdemann (GER)	T-Mobile Team	+ 2"

=== Stage 5 ===
14 June – La Chaux-de-Fonds to Leukerbad, 210 km (130 mi)

Stage 5 result

Rank	Rider	Team	Time
1	Steve Morabito (SUI)	Phonak	5h 37' 47"
2	Jurgen Van Goolen (BEL)	Discovery Channel	+ 14"
3	Ángel Vicioso Arcos (ESP)	Astana–Würth	+ 16"

General Classification after Stage 5

Rank	Rider	Team	Time
1	Ángel Vicioso Arcos (ESP)	Astana–Würth	21h 53' 31"
2	Jörg Jaksche (GER)	Astana–Würth	+ 2"
3	Linus Gerdemann (GER)	T-Mobile Team	+ 3"

=== Stage 6 ===
15 June – Fiesch to La Punt, 210 km (130 mi)

Stage 6 result

Rank	Rider	Team	Time
1	Koldo Gil Perez (ESP)	Saunier Duval–Prodir	5h 49' 52"
2	Jörg Jaksche (GER)	Astana–Würth	+ 36"
3	~~Jan Ullrich (GER)~~	T-Mobile Team	+ 40"

General Classification after Stage 6

Rank	Rider	Team	Time
1	Koldo Gil Perez (ESP)	Saunier Duval–Prodir	27h 43' 21"
2	Jörg Jaksche (GER)	Astana–Würth	+ 34"
3	Jan Ullrich (GER)	T-Mobile Team	+ 54"

=== Stage 7 ===
16 June – St. Moritz to Ascona, 233 km (145 mi)

Stage 7 result

Rank	Rider	Team	Time
1	Óscar Freire (ESP)	Rabobank	5h 38' 49"
2	Daniele Bennati (ITA)	Lampre–Fondital	+ 3"
3	Erik Zabel (GER)	Team Milram	+ 3"

General Classification after Stage 7

Rank	Rider	Team	Time
1	Koldo Gil Perez (ESP)	Saunier Duval–Prodir	33h 22' 21"
2	Jörg Jaksche (GER)	Astana–Würth	+ 30"
3	Jan Ullrich (GER)	T-Mobile Team	+ 50"

=== Stage 8 ===
17 June – Ambrì to Ambri, 155 km (96 mi)

Stage 8 result

Rank	Rider	Team	Time
1	Alberto Contador (ESP)	Astana–Würth	4h 19' 03"
2	David Herrero Llorente (ESP)	Euskaltel–Euskadi	+ 34"
3	Cadel Evans (AUS)	Davitamon–Lotto	+ 34"

General Classification after Stage 8

Rank	Rider	Team	Time
1	Koldo Gil Perez (ESP)	Saunier Duval–Prodir	37h 42' 01"
2	Jörg Jaksche (GER)	Astana–Würth	+ 30"
3	~~Jan Ullrich (GER)~~	T-Mobile Team	+ 50"

=== Stage 9 ===
18 June – Kerzers to Bern, 30 km (19 mi)

Stage 9 result

Rank	Rider	Team	Time
1	~~Jan Ullrich (GER)~~	T-Mobile Team	38' 45"
2	Cadel Evans (AUS)	Davitamon–Lotto	+ 23"
3	Ángel Vicioso (ESP)	Astana–Würth	+ 31"

General Classification after Stage 9

Rank	Rider	Team	Time
1	Jan Ullrich (GER)	T-Mobile Team	38h 21' 36"
2	Koldo Gil Perez (ESP)	Saunier Duval–Prodir	+ 24"
3	Jörg Jaksche (GER)	Astana–Würth	+ 1' 03"

== Final standings ==
=== General classification ===
	Rider	Team	Time
1	~~Jan Ullrich (GER)~~	T-Mobile Team	38h 21' 36"
2	Koldo Gil Perez (ESP)	Saunier Duval–Prodir	+ 24"
3	Jörg Jaksche (GER)	Astana–Würth	+ 1' 03"
4	Ángel Vicioso (ESP)	Astana–Würth	+ 1' 44"
5	Janez Brajkovič (SLO)	Discovery Channel	+ 2' 33"
6	Fränk Schleck (LUX)	Team CSC	+ 2' 56"
7	Linus Gerdemann (GER)	T-Mobile Team	+ 3' 31"
8	Giampaolo Caruso (ITA)	Astana–Würth	+ 4' 20"
9	Vladimir Karpets (RUS)	Caisse d'Epargne–Illes Balears	+ 4' 27"
10	Cadel Evans (AUS)	Davitamon–Lotto	+ 5' 01"

=== Points classification ===
The Points Classification of the Tour de Suisse is for points awarded for most consistently high finisher of the stages (equivalent to the Tour de France's green jersey). The Sprints Classification is for intermediate sprints.

	Rider	Team	Points
1	Daniele Bennati (ITA)	Lampre–Fondital	71
2	Ángel Vicioso Arcos (ESP)	Astana–Würth	51
3	Koldo Gil Perez (ESP)	Saunier Duval–Prodir	49

=== Mountains classification ===
	Rider	Team	Points
1	Michael Albasini (SUI)	Liquigas	61
2	Sven Montgomery (SUI)	Gerolsteiner	40
3	Francesco Bellotti (ITA)	Crédit Agricole	29

=== Sprint classification ===
The Sprints Classification of the Tour de Suisse is for intermediate sprints. The Points Classification is for points awarded for most consistently high finisher of the stages (equivalent to the Tour de France's green jersey).

	Rider	Team	Points
1	Michael Albasini (SUI)	Liquigas	21
2	Alberto Contador (ESP)	Astana–Würth	12
3	Alexandre Usov (BLR)	AG2R Prévoyance	12

== Jersey progress ==
Classification leadership by stage
Stage	Winner	General classification	Points classification	Mountains classification	Sprint classification	Team classification
1	Tom Boonen	Tom Boonen	Tom Boonen	José Antonio Redondo	Michael Albasini	Caisse d'Epargne–Illes Balears
2	Daniele Contrini	Daniele Bennati	Daniele Bennati	José Antonio Redondo	Daniele Contrini	Team LPR
3	Nick Nuyens	Nick Nuyens	Daniele Bennati	Michael Albasini	Michael Albasini	Team LPR
4	Ángel Vicioso	Nick Nuyens	Daniele Bennati	Michael Albasini	Michael Albasini	Saunier Duval–Prodir
5	Steve Morabito	Ángel Vicioso	Daniele Bennati	Michael Albasini	Michael Albasini	Saunier Duval–Prodir
6	Koldo Gil	Koldo Gil	Daniele Bennati	Michael Albasini	Michael Albasini	Würth
7	Óscar Freire	Koldo Gil	Daniele Bennati	Michael Albasini	Michael Albasini	Würth
8	Alberto Contador	Koldo Gil	Daniele Bennati	Michael Albasini	Michael Albasini	Würth
9	~~Jan Ullrich~~	~~Jan Ullrich~~	Daniele Bennati	Michael Albasini	Michael Albasini	Würth
Final		~~Jan Ullrich~~	Daniele Bennati	Michael Albasini	Michael Albasini	Würth
