= 1998 Vuelta a Murcia =

Race details
- Dates: 4–8 March 1998
- Stages: 5
- Distance: 650.1 km (404.0 mi)
- Winning time: 16h 35' 03"

Results
	Winner	Alberto Elli (ITA)
	Second	Alexander Vinokourov (KAZ)
	Third	Marco Pantani (ITA)

The 1998 Vuelta a Murcia was the 14th edition of the Vuelta a Murcia cycle race and was held on 4 March to 8 March 1998. The race started and finished in Murcia. The race was won by Alberto Elli.

== General classification ==
Final general classification

Rank	Rider	Time
1	Alberto Elli (ITA)	16h 35' 03"
2	Alexander Vinokourov (KAZ)	+ 41"
3	Marco Pantani (ITA)	+ 41"
4	Igor González de Galdeano (ESP)	+ 1' 16"
5	Melcior Mauri (ESP)	+ 1' 25"
6	Carmelo Miranda (ESP)	+ 1' 29"
7	Markus Zberg (SUI)	+ 1' 34"
8	Javier Otxoa (ESP)	+ 1' 49"
9	David García Marquina (ESP)	+ 1' 54"
10	Manuel Beltrán (ESP)	+ 2' 05"
