= David Cañada =

Spanish cyclist

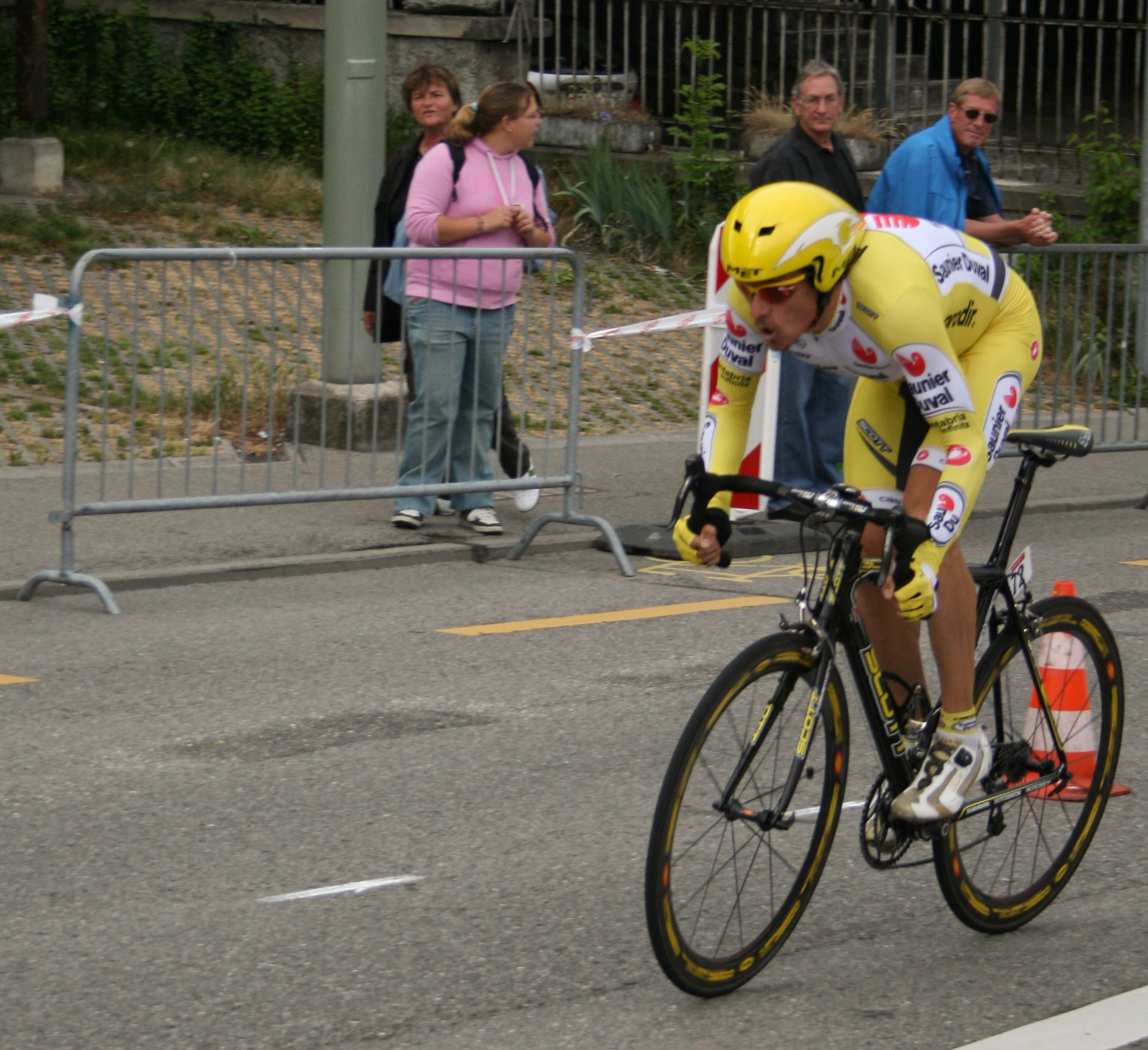
- Cañada racing in the 2007 Tour de Romandie

Personal information
- Full name: David Cañada Gracia
- Born: 11 March 1975 Zaragoza, Spain
- Died: 28 May 2016 (aged 41)
- Height: 1.76 m (5 ft 9 in)
- Weight: 65 kg (143 lb)

Cycling career
- Sport: Cycling
- Current team: Retired
- Discipline: Road
- Role: Rider

Professional teams
- 1996–2000: ONCE
- 2001–2002: Mapei–Quick-Step
- 2003: Quick-Step–Davitamon
- 2004–2009: Saunier Duval–Prodir

Major wins
- Volta a Catalunya (2006); Vuelta a Murcia (2000); Circuit de la Sarthe (2000)

David Cañada Gracia (11 March 1975 – 28 May 2016) was a Spanish professional road racing cyclist. His win at the 2006 Volta a Catalunya is his best career accomplishment. In the 2005 Tour de France, he was in a break-away on stage 2 (the first open road stage); he attacked on the climb near the finish but was overhauled by Bouygues Télécom's Thomas Voeckler. Cañada was unable to compete in the 2009 season, due to treatment for skin cancer which had been detected in 2007, and retired early in the 2010 season, having been unable to find a team. He died unexpectedly at the age of 41 after a fall during a cyclosportive.

== Major results ==
1996
8th Overall GP Tell
1997
2nd Overall Vuelta a los Valles Mineros
3rd Overall Volta ao Alentejo
1998
6th Overall Vuelta a Castilla y León
1999
5th GP Villafranca de Ordizia
2000
1st Overall Vuelta a Murcia

1st Stages 4 & 5 (ITT)

1st Overall Circuit de la Sarthe

1st Stage 4 (ITT)

1st Stage 1 (TTT) Volta a Catalunya
5th Overall Vuelta a La Rioja
6th Clásica de San Sebastián
2002
4th Overall Ronde van Nederland
6th Overall Tour de Langkawi
8th Overall Volta a la Comunitat Valenciana
2003
3rd Overall Tour de Luxembourg
7th Giro di Toscana
8th Overall Tour Down Under
2004
7th Overall Vuelta a Murcia
10th Overall Tour de Suisse
2005
3rd Rund um Köln
7th Overall Vuelta a Andalucía
2006
1st Overall Volta a Catalunya
4th Overall Escalada a Montjuïc
2007
3rd Overall Tour de Georgia
4th Overall Tour of Missouri`
2008
10th Overall Tour of Turkey
