= 1990 Vuelta a Murcia =

Race details
- Dates: 6–11 March 1990
- Stages: 6
- Distance: 848 km (526.9 mi)
- Winning time: 21h 46' 23"

Results
	Winner	Tom Cordes (NED)
	Second	Santos Hernández (ESP)
	Third	Eduardo Chozas (ESP)

The 1990 Vuelta a Murcia was the sixth edition of the Vuelta a Murcia cycle race and was held on 6 March to 11 March 1990. The race started in Águilas and finished in Murcia. The race was won by Tom Cordes.

== General classification ==
Final general classification

Rank	Rider	Time
1	Tom Cordes (NED)	21h 46' 23"
2	Santos Hernández (ESP)	+ 11"
3	Eduardo Chozas (ESP)	+ 11"
4	Peter Winnen (NED)	+ 25"
5	Marco Giovannetti (ITA)	+ 48"
6	Víctor Gonzalo (ESP)	+ 51"
7	David Rayner (GBR)	+ 57"
8	Atle Pedersen (NOR)	+ 1' 25"
9	Luc Suykerbuyk (NED)	+ 1' 25"
10	Eddy Schepers (BEL)	+ 1' 41"
