= Daniele Contrini =

Italian cyclist

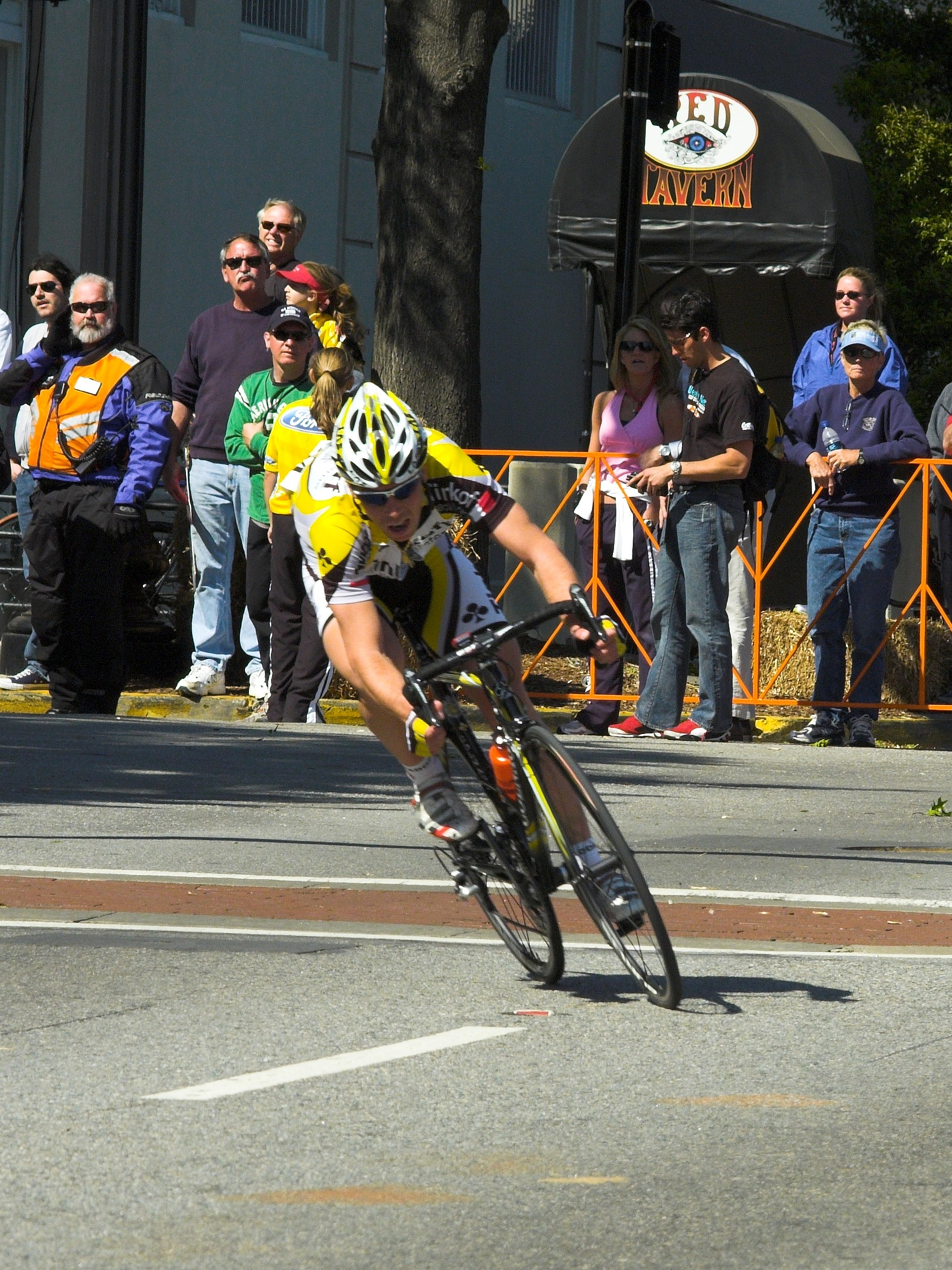

Personal information
- Full name: Daniele Contrini
- Born: August 15, 1974 (age 52) Gardone Val Trompia, Italy

Cycling career
- Sport: Cycling
- Discipline: Road
- Role: Rider

Professional teams
- 1995–1998: Brescialat
- 1999–2001: Liquigas
- 2002–2003: Gerolsteiner
- 2004–2006: LPR
- 2007–2008: Tinkoff Credit Systems

Major wins
- Tour de Suisse, 1 stage (2006)

Daniele Contrini (born 15 August 1974, in Gardone Val Trompia) is an Italian racing cyclist. His major victory was the 2nd stage in the 2006 Tour de Suisse in Einsiedeln.

== Palmares ==
- Tour of Georgia - 1 stage (2007)
- Tour de Suisse - 1 stage (2006)
- Route Adelié (2005)
- Tour de Picardie - 1 stage (2005)
- Sachsen Tour - 1 stage (2003)
- National Time Trial Championship
  - 2nd (2000)
  - 3rd (2001)
- GP KRKA (1998)
- Four Days of Dunkirk
  - 1 stage & 3rd Final (1997)
  - Mountains Classification (2000)
- Olympia's Tour - 1 stage (1997)
- European Road U23 Championship - 2nd (1996)
