= 2006 Volta a Catalunya =

Race details
- Dates: 15–21 May 2006
- Stages: 7
- Distance: 1,020.6 km (634.2 mi)
- Winning time: 25h 06' 26"

Results
	Winner	David Cañada (ESP)	(Saunier Duval–Prodir)
	Second	Santiago Botero (COL)	(Phonak)
	Third	Christophe Moreau (FRA)	(AG2R Prévoyance)

The 2006 Volta a Catalunya was the 86th edition of the Volta a Catalunya cycling race took place from 15 May to 21 May 2006, in Catalonia. The race began in Salou with an individual time trial and ended in Barcelona. The race was won by David Cañada of Spain.

== Teams ==
Twenty-five teams of up to eight riders started the race:

- Discovery Channel
- Phonak
- Caisse d'Epargne–Illes Balears
- Rabobank
- T-Mobile Team
- Team CSC
- AG2R Prévoyance
- Euskaltel–Euskadi
- Davitamon–Lotto
- Saunier Duval–Prodir
- Bouygues Télécom
- Gerolsteiner
- Team Milram
- Liberty Seguros–Würth
- Crédit Agricole
- Cofidis
- Française des Jeux
- Lampre–Fondital
- Liquigas
- Quick-Step–Innergetic
- Comunidad Valenciana
- Relax–GAM
- Kaiku
- Andalucía–Paul Versan
- 3 Molinos Resort

== Route ==
Stage characteristics and winners
Stage	Date	Course	Distance	Type	Winner
1	15 May	Salou to Salou	12.6 km (7.8 mi)	Individual time trial	Fabian Cancellara (SUI)
2	16 May	Cambrils to Cambrils	156.8 km (97.4 mi)		Luis Pérez Rodríguez (ESP)
3	17 May	Salou to Sant Carles de la Ràpita	176.7 km (109.8 mi)		Thor Hushovd (NOR)
4	18 May	Perafort to Arcalis	225 km (139.8 mi)		Carlos Castaño (ESP)
5	19 May	Llívia to Manlleu	161.5 km (100.4 mi)		Adolfo García (ESP)
6	20 May	Manlleu to Lloret de Mar	166.4 km (103.4 mi)		Matej Mugerli (SLO)
7	21 May	Lloret de Mar to Barcelona	121.6 km (75.6 mi)		Daniele Bennati (ITA)

== Stages ==
=== Stage 1 ===
15 May 2006 – Salou, 12.6 km (7.8 mi) (ITT)

The stage was an individual time trial.

Rank	Rider	Team	Time
1	Fabian Cancellara (SUI)	Team CSC	14' 55"
2	Vladimir Karpets (RUS)	Caisse d'Epargne–Illes Balears	+ 3"
3	Janez Brajkovič (SLO)	Discovery Channel	+ 3"

=== Stage 2 ===
16 May 2006 – Cambrils, 146.9 km (91.3 mi)

Rank	Rider	Team	Time
1	Luis Pérez Rodríguez (ESP)	Andalucía–Paul Versan	3h 57' 14"
2	Isaac Gálvez (ESP)	Caisse d'Epargne–Illes Balears	+ 12"
3	Thor Hushovd (NOR)	Crédit Agricole	+ 12"

=== Stage 3 ===
17 May 2006 – Salou to Sant Carles de la Ràpita, 160.6 km (99.8 mi)

Rank	Rider	Team	Time
1	Thor Hushovd (NOR)	Crédit Agricole	4h 16' 14"
2	René Haselbacher (AUT)	Gerolsteiner	s.t.
3	Robert Hunter (RSA)	Phonak	s.t.

=== Stage 4 ===
18 May 2006 – Perafort to Vallnord, 225 km (140 mi)

Rank	Rider	Team	Time
1	Carlos Castaño (ESP)	Kaiku	6h 03' 41"
2	Christophe Moreau (FRA)	AG2R Prévoyance	+ 52"
3	Santiago Botero (COL)	Phonak	+ 1' 53"

=== Stage 5 ===
19 May 2006 – Llívia to Manlleu, 161.5 km (100.4 mi)

Rank	Rider	Team	Time
1	Adolfo García (ESP)	Andalucía–Paul Versan	3h 52' 44"
2	David Arroyo (ESP)	Caisse d'Epargne–Illes Balears	s.t.
3	Eladio Jiménez (ESP)	Comunidad Valenciana	s.t.

=== Stage 6 ===
20 May 2006 – Manlleu to Lloret de Mar, 166.4 km (103.4 mi)

Rank	Rider	Team	Time
1	Matej Mugerli (SLO)	Liquigas	4h 02' 01"
2	Thor Hushovd (NOR)	Crédit Agricole	s.t.
3	Manuel Quinziato (ITA)	Liquigas	s.t.

=== Stage 7 ===
21 May 2006: Lloret de Mar to Barcelona, 121.6 km (75.6 mi)

Rank	Rider	Team	Time
1	Daniele Bennati (ITA)	Lampre–Fondital	2h 36' 37"
2	Aaron Kemps (AUS)	Liberty Seguros–Würth	s.t.
3	Erik Zabel (GER)	Team Milram	s.t.

== Classification tables ==
=== General classification ===
Rank	Rider	Team	Time
1	David Cañada (ESP)	Saunier Duval–Prodir	25h 06' 26"
2	Santiago Botero (COL)	Phonak	+ 2"
3	Christophe Moreau (FRA)	AG2R Prévoyance	+ 8"
4	Ryder Hesjedal (CAN)	Phonak	+ 35"
5	Janez Brajkovič (SLO)	Discovery Channel	+ 48"
6	Linus Gerdemann (GER)	T-Mobile Team	+ 57"
7	Francisco Mancebo (ESP)	AG2R Prévoyance	+ 1' 11"
8	Vladimir Karpets (RUS)	Caisse d'Epargne–Illes Balears	+ 1' 24"
9	Denis Menchov (RUS)	Rabobank	+ 1' 27"
10	David Arroyo (ESP)	Caisse d'Epargne–Illes Balears	+ 1' 35"

=== Mountains classification ===
Rank	Rider	Team	Points
1	Christophe Moreau (FRA)	AG2R Prévoyance	84
2	José Alberto Benítez (ESP)	Saunier Duval–Prodir	46
3	Francisco José Lara (ESP)	Andalucía–Paul Versan	31

=== Points classification ===
Rank	Rider	Team	Points
1	Thor Hushovd (NOR)	Crédit Agricole	69
2	Daniele Bennati (ITA)	Lampre–Fondital	49
3	Aaron Kemps (AUS)	Liberty Seguros–Würth	41

=== Best team ===
Rank	Team	Country	Time
1	Phonak	Switzerland	75h 22' 34"
2	Caisse d'Epargne–Illes Balears	Spain	+ 21"
3	AG2R Prévoyance	France	+ 1' 12"
