= 2004 Tour de Suisse =

Race details
- Dates: 12–20 June 2004
- Stages: 9
- Distance: 1,401 km (870.5 mi)
- Winning time: 34h 19' 25"

Results
	Winner	Jan Ullrich (GER)	(T-Mobile Team)
	Second	Fabian Jeker (SUI)	(Saunier Duval–Prodir)
	Third	Dario Cioni (ITA)	(Fassa Bortolo)

The 2004 Tour de Suisse was the 68th edition of the Tour de Suisse cycle race and was held from 12 June to 20 June 2004. The race started in Sursee and finished in Lugano. The race was won by Jan Ullrich of the T-Mobile team.

== Teams ==
Eighteen teams of eight riders started the race:

- T-Mobile Team
- Alessio–Bianchi
- Crédit Agricole
- Chocolade Jacques–Wincor Nixdorf
- Team CSC
- De Nardi–Piemme Telekom
- Fassa Bortolo
- Gerolsteiner
- Lampre
- Lotto–Domo
- Milaneza–Maia
- Mr. Bookmaker–Palmans–Collstrop
- Phonak
- Quick-Step–Davitamon
- Rabobank
- Saeco
- Saunier Duval–Prodir
- Vini Caldirola–Nobili Rubinetterie

== Route ==
Stage characteristics and winners
Stage	Date	Course	Distance	Type	Winner
1	12 June	Sursee to Beromünster	176 km (109.4 mi)	Flat stage	Jan Ullrich (GER)
2	13 June	Dürrenroth to Rheinfelden	169.9 km (105.6 mi)	Flat stage	Robbie McEwen (AUS)
3	14 June	Rheinfelden to Juraparc-Vallorbe	185 km (115.0 mi)	Medium mountain stage	Robbie Hunter (RSA)
4	15 June	Vallée de Joux to Bätterkinden	211.6 km (131.5 mi)	Hilly stage	Robbie McEwen (AUS)
5	16 June	Bätterkinden to Adelboden	161.7 km (100.5 mi)	Medium mountain stage	Robbie Hunter (RSA)
6	17 June	Frutigen to Linthal	185.4 km (115.2 mi)	Mountain stage	Niki Aebersold (SUI)
7	18 June	Linthal to Malbun	133 km (82.6 mi)	Medium mountain stage	Georg Totschnig (AUT)
8	19 June	Buchs to Bellinzone	191.3 km (118.9 mi)	Mountain stage	Paolo Bettini (ITA)
9	20 June	Lugano to Lugano	25.6 km (15.9 mi)	Individual time trial	Jan Ullrich (GER)

== Stages ==
=== Stage 1 ===
12 June 2004 - Sursee to Beromünster, 176 km (109 mi)

Stage 1 result

Rank	Rider	Team	Time
1	Jan Ullrich (GER)	T-Mobile Team	4h 07' 56"
2	Oscar Camenzind (SUI)	Phonak	s.t.
3	Fabian Jeker (SUI)	Saunier Duval–Prodir	s.t.

=== Stage 2 ===
13 June 2004 - Dürrenroth to Rheinfelden, 169.9 km (105.6 mi)

Stage 2 result

Rank	Rider	Team	Time
1	Robbie McEwen (AUS)	Lotto–Domo	3h 44' 57"
2	Olaf Pollack (GER)	Gerolsteiner	s.t.
3	Robbie Hunter (RSA)	Rabobank	s.t.

=== Stage 3 ===
14 June 2004 - Rheinfelden to Juraparc-Vallorbe, 185 km (115 mi)

Stage 3 result

Rank	Rider	Team	Time
1	Robbie Hunter (RSA)	Rabobank	4h 05' 07"
2	Grégory Rast (SUI)	Phonak	+ 2"
3	Jurgen Van Goolen (BEL)	Quick-Step–Davitamon	+ 19"

=== Stage 4 ===
15 June 2004 - Vallée de Joux to Bätterkinden, 211.6 km (131.5 mi)

Stage 4 result

Rank	Rider	Team	Time
1	Robbie McEwen (AUS)	Lotto–Domo	4h 51' 50"
2	Francesco Chicchi (ITA)	Fassa Bortolo	s.t.
3	Olaf Pollack (GER)	Gerolsteiner	s.t.

=== Stage 5 ===
16 June 2004 - Bätterkinden to Adelboden, 161.7 km (100.5 mi)

Stage 5 result

Rank	Rider	Team	Time
1	Robbie Hunter (RSA)	Rabobank	3h 46' 16"
2	Murilo Fischer (BRA)	De Nardi–Piemme Telekom	+ 35"
3	Michael Blaudzun (DEN)	Team CSC	+ 37"

=== Stage 6 ===
17 June 2004 - Frutigen to Linthal, 185.4 km (115.2 mi)

Stage 6 result

Rank	Rider	Team	Time
1	Niki Aebersold (SUI)	Phonak	5h 04' 07"
2	Thorwald Veneberg (NED)	Rabobank	+ 2' 51"
3	Roger Beuchat (SUI)	Vini Caldirola–Nobili Rubinetterie	+ 3' 00"

=== Stage 7 ===
18 June 2004 - Linthal to Malbun, 133 km (83 mi)

Stage 7 result

Rank	Rider	Team	Time
1	Georg Totschnig (AUT)	Gerolsteiner	3h 22' 45"
2	Fabian Jeker (SUI)	Saunier Duval–Prodir	+ 7"
3	Fränk Schleck (LUX)	Team CSC	+ 14"

=== Stage 8 ===
19 June 2004 - Buchs to Bellinzone, 191.3 km (118.9 mi)

Stage 8 result

Rank	Rider	Team	Time
1	Paolo Bettini (ITA)	Quick-Step–Davitamon	4h 30' 25"
2	Patrick Calcagni (SUI)	Vini Caldirola–Nobili Rubinetterie	+ 1' 04"
3	Kim Kirchen (LUX)	Fassa Bortolo	+ 1' 53"

=== Stage 9 ===
20 June 2004 - Lugano to Lugano, 25.6 km (15.9 mi) (ITT)

Stage 9 result

Rank	Rider	Team	Time
1	Jan Ullrich (GER)	T-Mobile Team	31' 36"
2	László Bodrogi (HUN)	Quick-Step–Davitamon	+ 8"
3	Fabian Cancellara (SUI)	Fassa Bortolo	+ 10"

== General classification ==
Final general classification

Rank	Rider	Team	Time
1	Jan Ullrich (GER)	T-Mobile Team	34h 19' 25"
2	Fabian Jeker (SUI)	Saunier Duval–Prodir	+ 1"
3	Dario Cioni (ITA)	Fassa Bortolo	+ 1' 20"
4	Georg Totschnig (AUT)	Gerolsteiner	+ 1' 26"
5	Evgeni Petrov (RUS)	Saeco	+ 2' 14"
6	Txema del Olmo (ESP)	Milaneza-Maia	+ 2' 17"
7	Patrik Sinkewitz (GER)	Quick-Step–Davitamon	+ 3' 18"
8	Giuseppe Guerini (ITA)	T-Mobile Team	+ 3' 20"
9	Oscar Camenzind (SUI)	Phonak	+ 4' 38"
10	David Cañada (ESP)	Saunier Duval–Prodir	+ 4' 46"
