= 2005 Vuelta a Murcia =

Race details
- Dates: 2–6 March 2005
- Stages: 5
- Distance: 642.7 km (399.4 mi)
- Winning time: 15h 53' 08"

Results
	Winner	Koldo Gil (ESP)
	Second	Antonio Colom (ESP)
	Third	Damiano Cunego (ITA)

The 2005 Vuelta a Murcia was the 21st professional edition of the Vuelta a Murcia cycle race and was held on 2 March to 6 March 2005. The race started and finished in Murcia. The race was won by Koldo Gil.

== General classification ==
Final general classification

Rank	Rider	Time
1	Koldo Gil (ESP)	15h 53' 08"
2	Antonio Colom (ESP)	+ 30"
3	Damiano Cunego (ITA)	+ 59"
4	Pedro Arreitunandia (ESP)	+ 1' 09"
5	Ezequiel Mosquera (ESP)	+ 1' 35"
6	Levi Leipheimer (USA)	+ 1' 47"
7	José Luis Martínez (ESP)	+ 1' 54"
8	Danilo Hondo (GER)	+ 2' 11"
9	Pieter Weening (NED)	+ 2' 16"
10	Rory Sutherland (AUS)	+ 2' 27"
