= 2005 Tour de Suisse =

Race details
- Dates: 11—19 June 2005
- Stages: 9
- Distance: 1,354.6 km (841.7 mi)
- Winning time: 33h 08' 51"

Results
Jersey awarded to the overall winner	Winner	Aitor González (ESP)	(Euskaltel–Euskadi)
	Second	Michael Rogers (AUS)	(Quick-Step–Innergetic)
	Third	Jan Ullrich (GER)	(T-Mobile Team)
Jersey awarded to the points classification winner	Points	Bradley McGee (AUS)	(Française des Jeux)
Jersey awarded to the mountains classification winner	Mountains	Roberto Laiseka (ESP)	(Euskaltel–Euskadi)
Jersey awarded to the sprints classification winner	Sprints	Michael Albasini (SUI)	(Liquigas–Bianchi)
	Team	Gerolsteiner	

The 2005 Tour de Suisse was the 69th edition of the Tour de Suisse road cycling stage race and was held from 11 June to 19 June 2005. The race started in Schaffhausen and finished in Ulrichen. Australian Michael Rogers was not able to defend his lead on the last day against Aitor González's attack.

== Teams ==
Twenty teams of eight riders started the race:

- T-Mobile Team
- Davitamon–Lotto
- Rabobank
- Phonak
- Team CSC
- Fassa Bortolo
- Saunier Duval–Prodir
- Liberty Seguros–Würth
- Crédit Agricole
- Liquigas–Bianchi
- Cofidis
- Discovery Channel
- Quick-Step–Innergetic
- Gerolsteiner
- Lampre–Caffita
- Bouygues Télécom
- Française des Jeux
- Illes Balears–Caisse d'Epargne
- Domina Vacanze
- Euskaltel–Euskadi

== Route ==
Stage characteristics and winners
Stage	Date	Course	Distance	Type	Winner
1	11 June	Schaffhausen to Weinfelden	170 km (105.6 mi)	Flat stage	Bernhard Eisel (AUT)
2	12 June	Weinfelden to Weinfelden	36 km (22.4 mi)	Individual time trial	~~Jan Ullrich (GER)~~
3	13 June	Abtwil/Säntiskpark to St Anton am Arlberg (Austria)	154 km (95.7 mi)	Medium mountain stage	Bradley McGee (AUS)
4	14 June	Vaduz (Liechtenstein) to Bad Zurzach	205 km (127.4 mi)	Hilly stage	Robbie McEwen (AUS)
5	15 June	Bad Zurzach to Altdorf	176 km (109.4 mi)	Hilly stage	Michael Albasini (SUI)
6	16 June	Bürglen to Arosa	156 km (97 mi)	Mountain stage	Chris Horner (USA)
7	17 June	Einsiedeln to Lenk	193 km (119.9 mi)	Hilly stage	Linus Gerdemann (GER)
8	18 June	Lenk to Verbier	165 km (102.5 mi)	Medium mountain stage	Pablo Lastras (ESP)
9	19 June	Ulrichen	100 km (62.1 mi)	Mountain stage	Aitor González (ESP)

== Stages ==
=== Stage 1 ===
11 June 2005 - Schaffhausen to Weinfelden, 170 km (110 mi)

Stage 1 result and general classification after Stage 1

Rank	Rider	Team	Time
1	Bernhard Eisel (AUT)	Française des Jeux	4h 00' 07"
2	Tom Boonen (BEL)	Quick-Step–Innergetic	s.t.
3	Peter Wrolich (AUT)	Gerolsteiner	s.t.

=== Stage 2 ===
12 June 2005 - Weinfelden, 36 km (22 mi) (ITT)

Stage 2 result

Rank	Rider	Team	Time
1	Jan Ullrich (GER)	T-Mobile Team	44' 06"
2	Bradley McGee (AUS)	Française des Jeux	+ 15"
3	Michael Rogers (AUS)	Quick-Step–Innergetic	+ 18"

General classification after Stage 2

Rank	Rider	Team	Time
1	Jan Ullrich (GER)	T-Mobile Team	4h 44' 19"
2	Bradley McGee (AUS)	Française des Jeux	+ 12"
3	Michael Rogers (AUS)	Quick-Step–Innergetic	+ 18"

=== Stage 3 ===
13 June 2005 - Abtwil/Säntiskpark to St Anton am Arlberg, 154 km (96 mi)

Stage 3 result

Rank	Rider	Team	Time
1	Bradley McGee (AUS)	Française des Jeux	3h 46' 51"
2	Mirko Celestino (ITA)	Domina Vacanze	s.t.
3	Patrik Sinkewitz (GER)	Quick-Step–Innergetic	s.t.

General classification after Stage 3

Rank	Rider	Team	Time
1	Jan Ullrich (GER)	T-Mobile Team	8h 31' 10"
2	Bradley McGee (AUS)	Française des Jeux	+ 2"
3	Michael Rogers (AUS)	Quick-Step–Innergetic	+ 18"

=== Stage 4 ===
14 June 2005 - Vaduz to Bad Zurzach, 208 km (129 mi)

Stage 4 result

Rank	Rider	Team	Time
1	Robbie McEwen (AUS)	Davitamon–Lotto	4h 42' 40"
2	Daniele Colli (ITA)	Liquigas–Bianchi	s.t.
3	Aurélien Clerc (SUI)	Phonak	s.t.

General classification after Stage 4

Rank	Rider	Team	Time
1	Jan Ullrich (GER)	T-Mobile Team	12h 13' 50"
2	Bradley McGee (AUS)	Française des Jeux	+ 2"
3	Michael Rogers (AUS)	Quick-Step–Innergetic	+ 18"

=== Stage 5 ===
15 June 2005 - Bad Zurzach to Altdorf, 173 km (107 mi)

Stage 5 result

Rank	Rider	Team	Time
1	Michael Albasini (SUI)	Liquigas–Bianchi	3h 48' 01"
2	Grégory Rast (SUI)	Phonak	s.t.
3	René Haselbacher (AUT)	Gerolsteiner	s.t.

General classification after Stage 5

Rank	Rider	Team	Time
1	Jan Ullrich (GER)	T-Mobile Team	17h 02' 33"
2	Bradley McGee (AUS)	Française des Jeux	+ 2"
3	Michael Rogers (AUS)	Quick-Step–Innergetic	+ 18"

=== Stage 6 ===
16 June 2005 - Bürglen to Arosa, 158 km (98 mi)

Stage 6 result

Rank	Rider	Team	Time
1	Chris Horner (USA)	Saunier Duval–Prodir	4h 24' 43"
2	Vincenzo Nibali (ITA)	Fassa Bortolo	+ 1' 12"
3	Michael Rogers (AUS)	Quick-Step–Innergetic	+ 1' 14"

General classification after Stage 6

Rank	Rider	Team	Time
1	Michael Rogers (AUS)	Quick-Step–Innergetic	21h 28' 40"
2	Jan Ullrich (GER)	T-Mobile Team	+ 20"
3	Bradley McGee (AUS)	Française des Jeux	+ 22"

=== Stage 7 ===
17 June 2005 - Einsiedeln to Lenk, 193 km (120 mi)

Stage 7 result

Rank	Rider	Team	Time
1	Linus Gerdemann (GER)	Team CSC	4h 25' 00"
2	Lorenzo Bernucci (ITA)	Fassa Bortolo	+ 4"
3	David Etxebarria (ESP)	Liberty Seguros–Würth	+ 14"

General classification after Stage 7

Rank	Rider	Team	Time
1	Michael Rogers (AUS)	Quick-Step–Innergetic	25h 54' 03"
2	Jan Ullrich (GER)	T-Mobile Team	+ 20"
3	Bradley McGee (AUS)	Française des Jeux	+ 22"

=== Stage 8 ===
18 June 2005 - Lenk to Verbier, 165 km (103 mi)

Stage 8 result

Rank	Rider	Team	Time
1	Pablo Lastras (ESP)	Illes Balears–Caisse d'Epargne	4h 09' 09"
2	Carlos Barredo (ESP)	Liberty Seguros–Würth	+ 16"
3	Fabian Wegmann (GER)	Gerolsteiner	+ 16"

General classification after Stage 8

Rank	Rider	Team	Time
1	Michael Rogers (AUS)	Quick-Step–Innergetic	30h 04' 33"
2	Jan Ullrich (GER)	T-Mobile Team	+ 20"
3	Bradley McGee (AUS)	Française des Jeux	+ 22"

=== Stage 9 ===
19 June 2005 - Ulrichen, 100 km (62 mi)

Stage 9 result

Rank	Rider	Team	Time
1	Aitor González (ESP)	Euskaltel–Euskadi	3h 03' 52"
2	Fränk Schleck (LUX)	Team CSC	+ 46"
3	Daniel Atienza (ESP)	Cofidis	+ 58"

General classification after Stage 9

Rank	Rider	Team	Time
1	Aitor González (ESP)	Euskaltel–Euskadi	33h 08' 51"
2	Michael Rogers (AUS)	Quick-Step–Innergetic	+ 22"
3	Jan Ullrich (GER)	T-Mobile Team	+ 1' 36"

== Final standings ==
General classification

Rank	Rider	Team	Time
1	Aitor González (ESP)	Euskaltel–Euskadi	33h 08' 51"
2	Michael Rogers (AUS)	Quick-Step–Innergetic	+ 22"
3	Jan Ullrich (GER)	T-Mobile Team	+ 1' 36"
4	Fränk Schleck (LUX)	Team CSC	+ 1' 41"
5	Chris Horner (USA)	Saunier Duval–Prodir	+ 2' 02"
6	Koldo Gil (ESP)	Liberty Seguros–Würth	+ 2' 49"
7	Beat Zberg (SUI)	Gerolsteiner	+ 3' 47"
8	Bradley McGee (AUS)	Française des Jeux	+ 4' 13"
9	Tadej Valjavec (SLO)	Phonak	+ 4' 28"
10	Leonardo Piepoli (ITA)	Saunier Duval–Prodir	+ 6' 01"

Points classification

Rank	Rider	Team	Points
1	Bradley McGee (AUS)	Française des Jeux	42
2	René Haselbacher (AUT)	Gerolsteiner	39
3	Aurélien Clerc (SUI)	Phonak	35

Mountains classification

Rank	Rider	Team	Points
1	Roberto Laiseka (ESP)	Euskaltel–Euskadi	58
2	Chris Horner (USA)	Saunier Duval–Prodir	27
3	Koldo Gil (ESP)	Liberty Seguros–Würth	27

Sprint classification

Rank	Rider	Team	Points
1	Michael Albasini (SUI)	Liquigas–Bianchi	28
2	Grégory Rast (SUI)	Phonak	11
3	Koldo Gil (ESP)	Liberty Seguros–Würth	9

Team classification

Rank	Team	Time
1	Gerolsteiner	99h 44' 56"
2	Phonak	+ 2' 33"
3	Saunier Duval–Prodir	+ 3' 40"
