= 2006 Vuelta a Murcia =

Race details
- Dates: 1–5 March 2006
- Stages: 5
- Distance: 641.2 km (398.4 mi)
- Winning time: 15h 33' 02"

Results
	Winner	Santos González (ESP)
	Second	Iván Gutiérrez (ESP)
	Third	David Bernabeu (ESP)

The 2006 Vuelta a Murcia was the 22nd edition of the Vuelta a Murcia cycle race and was held on 1 March to 5 March 2006. The race started and finished in Murcia. The race was won by Santos González.

== General classification ==
Final general classification

Rank	Rider	Time
1	Santos González (ESP)	15h 33' 02"
2	Iván Gutiérrez (ESP)	+ 3"
3	David Bernabeu (ESP)	+ 27"
4	Jan Hruška (CZE)	+ 32"
5	Carlos García Quesada (ESP)	+ 39"
6	Ángel Vicioso (ESP)	+ 41"
7	Alejandro Valverde (ESP)	+ 1' 09"
8	Damiano Cunego (ITA)	+ 1' 41"
9	Giuliano Figueras (ITA)	+ 1' 53"
10	Emanuele Sella (ITA)	+ 2' 01"
