= Pedro Arreitunandia =

Spanish bicycle racer (1974–2025)

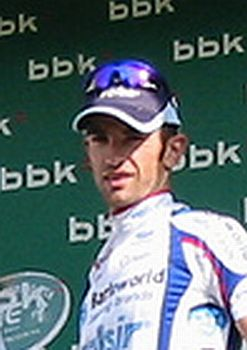
- Arreitunandia in 2005

Personal information
- Full name: Peio Arreitunandia Quintero
- Born: 24 July 1974 Pontevedra, Spain
- Died: 26 August 2025 (aged 51)

Cycling career
- Sport: Cycling
- Discipline: Road
- Role: Rider

Amateur team
- 1998: Olarra–Ercoreca

Professional teams
- 1999–2000: Euskaltel–Euskadi
- 2002–2003: Carvalhelhos–Boavista
- 2004: Cafés Baqué
- 2005–2007: Barloworld

Peio Arreitunandia Quintero (24 July 1974 – 26 August 2025) was a Spanish professional cyclist. He died on 26 August 2025, at the age of 51.

== Major results ==
1997
1st Stage 2 Vuelta a Navarra
1999
6th Overall Tour de l'Avenir
2001
1st Overall Vuelta a Palencia
1st Overall Vuelta a Tenerife
2002
3rd Overall Troféu Joaquim Agostinho
4th Overall Volta a Portugal
7th Clásica a los Puertos
2003
1st Stage 9 Volta a Portugal
3rd Clásica a los Puertos
4th Overall Troféu Joaquim Agostinho
8th GP Villafranca de Ordizia
2004
7th GP Llodio
9th Subida a Urkiola
2005
3rd Overall Setmana Catalana de Ciclisme
3rd Overall Brixia Tour
4th Overall Euskal Bizikleta

1st Stage 3

4th Overall Vuelta a Murcia

1st Stage 4

5th Overall Volta a Portugal
6th Klasika Primavera
9th Gran Premio Miguel Induráin
2006
4th Overall Euskal Bizikleta
6th Overall Clásica Internacional de Alcobendas
2007
2nd Gran Premio di Lugano
3rd Subida al Naranco
8th Coppa Placci
