= Jan Ullrich =

German cyclist (born 1973)

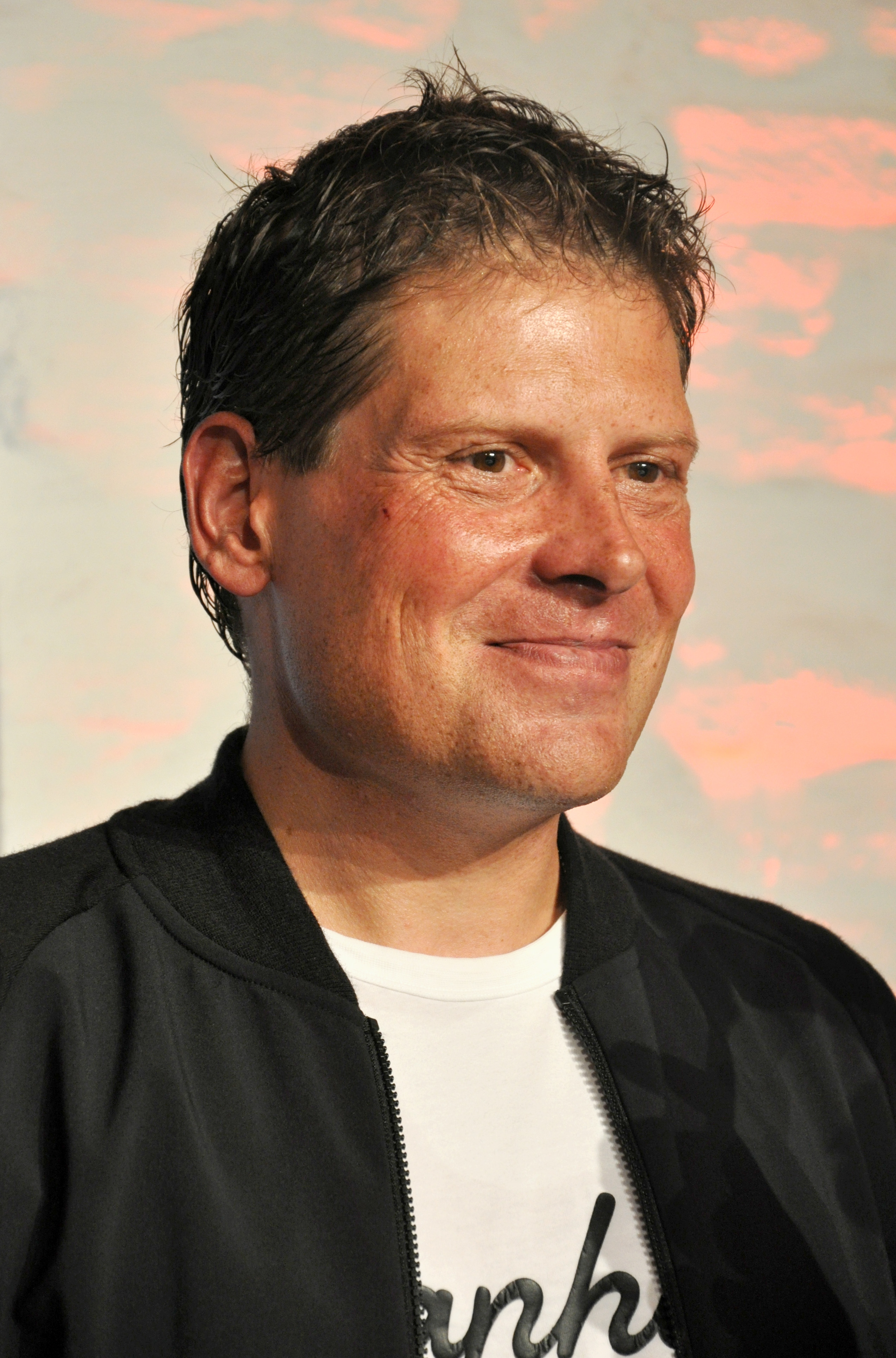
- Ullrich in 2016

Personal information
- Full name: Jan Ullrich
- Nicknames: Der Kaiser (The Emperor); Der Jan; Der Junge (The Young one); The Yoyo
- Born: 2 December 1973 (age 52) Rostock, East Germany
- Height: 1.83 m (6 ft 0 in)
- Weight: 73 kg (161 lb; 11 st 7 lb)

Cycling career
- Sport: Cycling
- Discipline: Road
- Role: Rider
- Rider type: All-rounder

Amateur teams
- 1987: SG Dynamo Rostock
- 1987–1989: SC Dynamo Berlin
- 1991: SC Berlin
- 1992–1994: RG Hamburg

Professional teams
- 1995–2002: Team Telekom
- 2003: Team Coast
- 2004–2006: T-Mobile Team

Major wins
- Grand Tours Tour de France General classification (1997) Young riders classification (1996, 1997, 1998) 7 individual stages (1996, 1997, 1998, 2003) Vuelta a España General classification (1999) 2 individual stages (1999) Stage races Tour de Suisse (2004) One-day races and Classics Olympic Road Race (2000) UCI Road World Championships – Time Trial (1999, 2001) UCI Road World Championships – Men's Amateur road race (1993) National Road Race Championships (1997, 2001) National Time Trial Championships (1995) Other Vélo d'Or (1997)
Medal record
Event	1st	2nd	3rd
Summer Olympics	1	1	0
Road World Championships	3	0	1
Total	4	1	1
Representing Germany
Men's road bicycle racing
Olympic Games
Gold medal – first place	2000 Sydney	Road race
Silver medal – second place	2000 Sydney	Time trial
World Championships
Gold medal – first place	1993 Oslo	Amateur road race
Gold medal – first place	1999 Verona	Time trial
Gold medal – first place	2001 Lisbon	Time trial
Bronze medal – third place	1994 Catania	Time trial

Jan Ullrich (German pronunciation: [jan ˈʊlʁɪç]; born 2 December 1973) is a German former professional road racing cyclist. Ullrich won gold and silver medals in the 2000 Summer Olympics in Sydney. He won the 1999 Vuelta a España and the HEW Cyclassics in front of a home crowd in Hamburg in 1997. He had podium finishes in the hilly classic Clásica de San Sebastián. His victorious ride in the 1997 Tour de France led to a bicycle boom in Germany. He retired in February 2007.

In 2006, Ullrich was barred from the Tour de France amid speculation of having doped. In February 2012, Ullrich was found guilty of a doping offence by the Court of Arbitration for Sport. He was retroactively banned from 22 August 2011, and all results gained since May 2005 were removed from his palmarès. In 2013 he admitted to blood doping, and in 2023 to using performance enhancing substances.

== Biography ==
=== Early life and amateur career ===
At a young age, Ullrich joined SG Dynamo Rostock (de) in his hometown. He won his first bicycle race at the age of nine while riding in sports shoes and on a rented bicycle. He was educated in the sports training system of the German Democratic Republic, attending the KJS sports school in Berlin in 1986. In 1988, he was champion of the German Democratic Republic. The school closed two years after the fall of the Berlin Wall in 1989. He, his trainer Peter Sager, and teammates joined an amateur club in Hamburg until 1994. In 1991, he was 5th in the amateur cyclo-cross world championships.

In 1993, aged 19, Ullrich won the amateur road title at the UCI Road World Championships in Oslo, as Lance Armstrong won the professional championship. The following year, he finished third behind Chris Boardman and Andrea Chiurato in the world time trial championship in Sicily.

=== Early professional career ===
In 1995, Ullrich turned professional for the Telekom team under Walter Godefroot.

Ullrich was inconspicuous in his first 18 months as a professional. In 1995, he became national time trial champion. He also achieved top ten placings on stages of the 1995 Tour de Suisse. At 21, he wanted to start the 1995 Tour de France but Godefroot thought it was too early. Instead, he went to the small German stage race, the Hofbräu Cup, where he ended third. Ullrich started the 1995 Vuelta a España later that year only to abandon on stage 12.

=== 1996 Tour de France ===
Ullrich gave up a place in the 1996 German Olympic team to ride his first Tour. He finished the prologue 33 seconds down. He stayed within the top 20 until the mountains on stage 7 when Miguel Induráin cracked. Ullrich finished 30 seconds back, 22 behind his teammate Bjarne Riis while Indurain finished four minutes down. On the following stage, he finished in the same group as Indurain, 40 seconds behind Riis. On stage 9, Riis rode into the yellow jersey as leader of the general classification while Ullrich finished 44 seconds back and also in 5th place overall, 1-minute 38 seconds from Riis.

Over the final mountains, Ullrich rode into second place behind Riis, but he conceded time on each mountain stage, eventually being nearly four minutes behind Riis. He won the final individual time trial and secured his first Tour stage win. He cut 2 minutes 18 seconds into Riis's lead. This led Indurain to comment that Ullrich would win the Tour someday, adding that it was a remarkable victory considering that Ullrich had been helping Riis. Ullrich dismissed suggestions he would have done better if he had not had to help Riis, saying Riis had inspired the team. Jan finished his first tour in second place at 1-minute 41 seconds from his teammate Bjarne Riis.

=== 1997 Tour de France ===
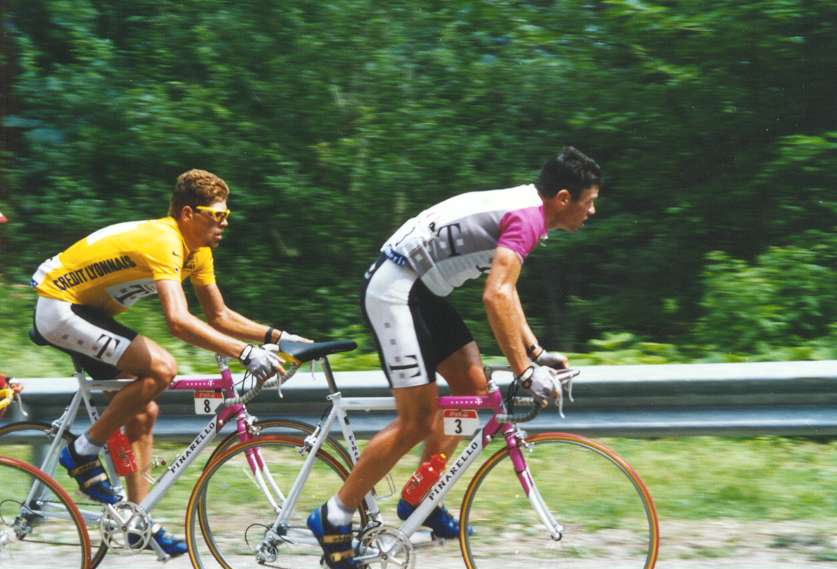
Ullrich with teammate Udo Bölts crossing the Vosges mountains during the 1997 Tour de France

Ullrich had 2 wins before the 1997 Tour: a stage in the Tour de Suisse and the national Road Race championship a week before the tour. He became the favourite in the 1997 Tour de France. He started strongly, finishing second in the prologue behind Chris Boardman. On stage 9, the first mountain stage, which was won by Laurent Brochard, Ullrich worked for Riis. Only on the last ascent, when Richard Virenque attacked, did Ullrich react. Riis struggled to keep up and finished 30 seconds behind Virenque, Marco Pantani and Ullrich. On stage 10 from Luchon to Andorra Arcalis, with Riis again falling back, Ullrich dropped back to the team car to ask permission to attack. He returned to the lead group and pushed up the climb, leaving Pantani and Virenque. He finished a minute ahead, which earned his first yellow jersey as leader of the general classification. L'Équipe, greeted Ullrich with Voilà le Patron ("Here is the boss"). Ullrich won the Stage 12 time trial with three minutes between himself and the second-placed rider, Virenque, who had started three minutes in front of him.

Marco Pantani attacked on the stage to the Alpe d'Huez. Ullrich, who was nine minutes ahead of Pantani overall, limited his losses to 47 seconds. Pantani attacked again on the Morzine stage and won, while Ullrich again limited his losses. In the final time trial, won by Abraham Olano, Ullrich extended his lead over Virenque and the following day became the first German to win the Tour de France. At 23, Ullrich was the fourth youngest winner of the Tour since 1947. Two weeks later, he won the Hews Cycling Classic in Hamburg. A further two weeks later, Ullrich was beaten by Davide Rebellin in a sprint in the GP Suisse. He was chosen "sports person of the year" in Germany in 1997.

=== 1998 Tour de France ===
Ullrich was the defending champion in 1998. He took the lead in the general classification on stage 7, a time trial, over 58 km of undulating roads. However, on stage 15, Marco Pantani blew the Tour apart with a victory which began on the Galibier. Ullrich was without support when Pantani attacked. Pantani topped the Galibier alone. It was misty and the roads were wet. The descent was dangerous and Pantani increased his lead. By the bottom of the final climb, Les Deux Alpes, Pantani had nearly four minutes. Telekom brought Udo Bölts and then Riis to pace Ullrich. Pantani was the race leader as he crossed the line. Ullrich finished almost nine minutes back, dropping to fourth position, six minutes behind Pantani.

Ullrich attacked on stage 16 on the Col de la Madeleine. Only Pantani could match him. Over the top, they started to work together. Ullrich won a photo-finish sprint and moved into third. He won the final stage, a 20 km time trial, and moved into second.

The Tour of 1998 was haunted by doping affairs, giving it the nickname "Tour de Dopage."

In the following year, during the inaugural Deutschland Tour, Ullrich fell after getting entangled with Udo Bölts during stage 3. He had a knee injury and could not ride the 1999 Tour, which ended in the first of seven 'victories' for Lance Armstrong. Ullrich set his targets on the world time trial championship in October by riding the Vuelta.

=== 1999 Vuelta a España ===
On the first mountain stage, Ullrich narrowly won against the defending Vuelta a España champion Abraham Olano of Team ONCE in a group sprint that included Frank Vandenbroucke, Roberto Heras and Davide Rebellin. Olano took the leader's golden jersey with Ullrich second. Olano won the following stage, a time trial, with almost one minute over Ullrich and increased his lead in stage 8. On stage 11, Ullrich gained 30 seconds back on Olano. Ullrich took the lead on stage 12 won by Igor González de Galdeano, Olano faltered due to a broken rib and finished seven minutes behind Ullrich. He later abandoned the race.

Gonzales de Galdeano had moved into second overall and became a threat to Ullrich. On stage 18, Banesto and other Spanish teams tried to crack Ullrich, who struggled on the final climb but recovered to limit his losses to González. In the final time trial, Ullrich won by almost three minutes and built his overall lead to four minutes on González. Ullrich won his second major Tour. Several weeks later, he became world time trial champion over Sweden's Michael Andersson and Briton Chris Boardman.

=== 'Eternal second' behind Armstrong ===
==== 2000–2002 Tours ====
The 2000 Tour de France brought Ullrich, Marco Pantani and Armstrong against each other for the first time. Armstrong proved too strong and won then and again in 2001. Ullrich crashed during a descent in 2001 and Armstrong waited for him to return to his bike. Ullrich cited his failure to defeat Armstrong as why he fell into depression the following year.

Ullrich rode well in the 2000 Summer Olympics in Sydney, Australia. After establishing a three-man break with Telekom teammates Andreas Klöden and Alexander Vinokourov, Ullrich won the gold with Vinokourov second and Klöden rounding out the all-Telekom podium. He won the silver in the time-trial, losing by only seven seconds to Viatcheslav Ekimov but beating Armstrong soundly into third.

In May 2002, Ullrich had his driver's license revoked after a drunk driving incident. After a positive blood sample for amphetamine in June 2002, Ullrich's contract with Team Telekom was ended, and he was banned for six months. He said he had taken ecstasy with amphetamine. He had not been racing since January due to a knee injury, and the German Cycling Federation's disciplinary committee agreed that he was not attempting to use the drug for performance enhancement, so he was given a minimum suspension.

Following a disappointing 2002 season, Ullrich was looking for a new team, with interest coming from CSC–Tiscali, Saeco–Longoni Sport, and Phonak.

==== 2003 Tour and sportsmanship ====
On 13 January 2003, Ullrich, along with his advisor Rudy Pevenage, joined Team Coast on a multi-million Euro deal. Financial problems at the team were known from the beginning of the season. These led to the Coast team folding in May 2003. Ullrich moved on to the newly founded Team Bianchi, set up from the remainders of Coast by Jacques Hanegraaf, a former cyclist at Team Telekom.

The 2003 Tour de France was the first in many years that Ullrich had not been considered a favourite. In the first week, Ullrich became sick and almost retired. He lost a minute and a half on Armstrong in the Alps. Ullrich fought back in the time trial. Armstrong had trouble with the heat and lost one and a half minutes to Ullrich. Ullrich was within a minute of Armstrong in the classification. The next day, he closed the gap by another 19 seconds in the first mountain stage. Two days later, Ullrich rode away from Armstrong on the Tourmalet, but Armstrong caught up. Halfway into the next climb, Luz Ardiden, Armstrong's handlebars got caught in a spectator's yellow musette waving in the air, and he fell. Ullrich waited for Armstrong to recover, returning the courteous display by Armstrong 2 years previously. Armstrong then caught the group and attacked shortly afterwards.

Ullrich lost 40 seconds in the final kilometres, but the final time trial would be decisive. In it, Ullrich crashed and saw a stage and Tour victory disappear. He finished second, by 71 seconds.

For waiting on Armstrong after his fall during the stage to Luz Ardiden, the German Olympic Association (Deutsche Olympische Gesellschaft) gave Ullrich their fair-play medal. Commenting on Ullrich's wait for Armstrong to recover, Dan Boyle, of the Institute for International Sport said "It was an act that will live with him forever, cynics will say he lost money, but it was a highly commendable thing that he did."

==== 2004 and 2005 Tour ====
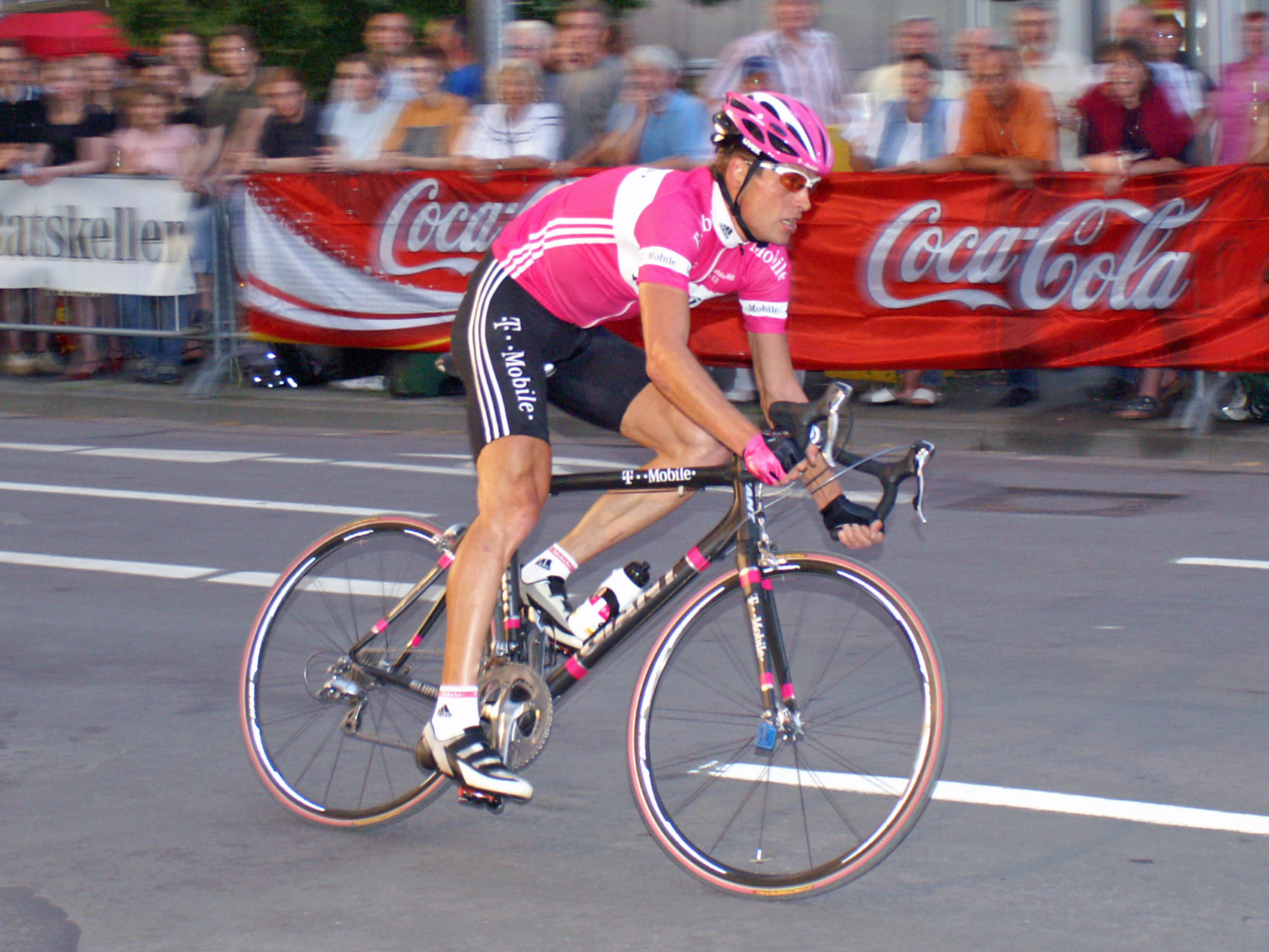
Ullrich in Hanover, 2005

For 2004, Ullrich returned to Team Telekom, now named T-Mobile. He won the Tour de Suisse, beating Swiss Fabian Jeker by one second overall. In the Tour de France, he finished fourth, 8:50 behind Armstrong, his first finish lower than second. Klöden finished second and Ivan Basso third.

For 2005, Ullrich again captained T-Mobile. He maintained a low profile for the early season, surfacing in the 2005 Tour de Suisse, which he finished third behind Aitor González and Michael Rogers.

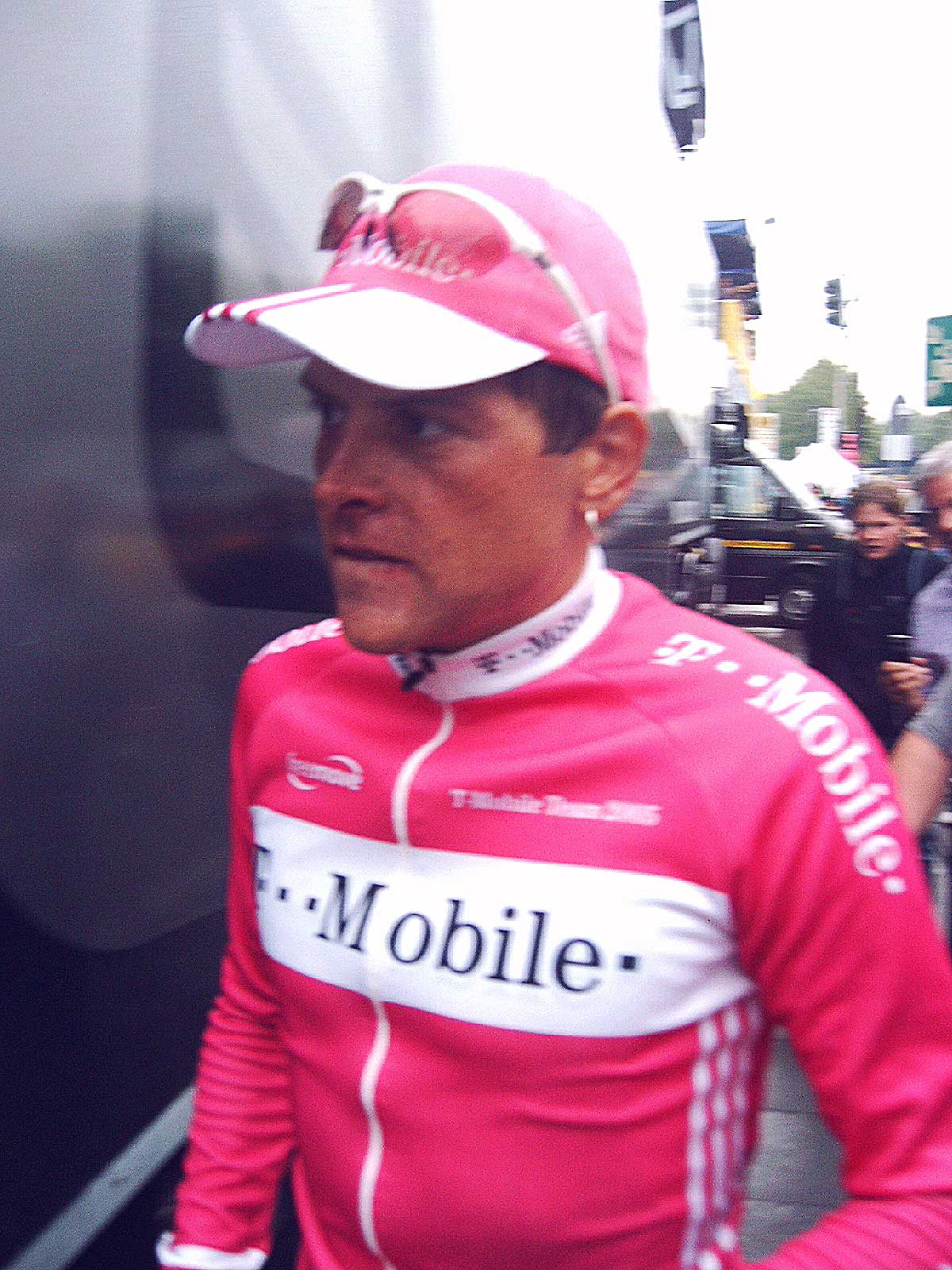
Ullrich in 2005

The day before the 2005 Tour de France, Ullrich was training when his team car stopped unexpectedly. Ullrich hit the back window, ending up in the back seat of the car. Less than 24 hours later, Ullrich was passed by Armstrong in the time trial. Ullrich fell again in the mountains, bruising his ribs. He could not keep up with Armstrong or Ivan Basso. Ullrich began focusing on finishing ahead of Michael Rasmussen for a podium position. He rode a good second time trial, beating all but Armstrong. Rasmussen had several crashes and bike changes, which gave Ullrich a podium place in the Tour.

=== Post-Armstrong ===
Armstrong retired after the Tour in 2005. Ullrich decided to ride one or two more years. Early reports said Ullrich was in better shape than in previous years and could be ready for his second victory in the Tour. Ullrich finished 115th in the Tour de Romandie on 30 April. However, he injured his knee in the off-season, which could have limited his performance in the 2006 Tour, had he participated (see below).

In May, riding the Giro d'Italia to prepare for the Tour, Ullrich targeted the stage 11 50 km time trial, and won by 28 seconds over Ivan Basso, who beat Marco Pinotti by another 33 seconds. Only five riders finished within two minutes of Ullrich.

Ullrich dropped out of the Giro during stage 19, with back pain. Rudy Pevenage said the problem was not bad but that Ullrich wanted to avoid Tour de France problems.

Ullrich won the Tour de Suisse for a second time, winning the final time trial and jumping from third to first.

=== Doping ===
During the 2006 Giro d'Italia, Ullrich was mentioned in a doping scandal, Operación Puerto. Ullrich denied the rumours. However, on 30 June 2006, one day before the Tour de France, he was suspended from participating. Ivan Basso and other riders were also excluded. On 20 July 2006, Ullrich was fired from T-Mobile. General manager Olaf Ludwig announced the news during the 18th stage of the Tour between Morzine and Macon. Ullrich said his dismissal was 'unacceptable.'

I am very disappointed that this decision was not communicated to me personally but that it was faxed to my lawyers. I find it shameful that after so many years of a good and fruitful working relationship and after all that I have done for the team, I am merely sent a fax.

On 3 August 2006, doping expert Werner Franke claimed Ullrich purchased, in a single year, about €35,000 worth of doping products; his claim was based on documents uncovered in the Operación Puerto doping case. A German court imposed a gag order on Franke after it found there was not enough evidence to link Ullrich to doping. On 14 September 2006, officials raided Ullrich's house and collected DNA material while Ullrich was honeymooning with his new wife Sara. On 4 April 2007, Ullrich's DNA sample had "without a doubt" matched nine bags of blood taken from Eufemiano Fuentes' office.

On 18 October 2006, Ullrich laid off his personal physiotherapist, Birgit Krohme. Speculation rose that this was a sign that Ullrich had given up hope of returning to racing. Ullrich denied these rumours. One day later, Ullrich cancelled his licence with the Swiss Cycling Federation, and was looking for a different federation for a licence in 2007. Ullrich claimed that the Swiss Cycling Federation had to stop their doping investigation, but the Swiss federation continued the investigation. On 25 October 2006, a document from the Spanish court on Ullrich's website stated that no charges would be filed.

On Monday, 26 February 2007, Ullrich retired. At the press conference in Hamburg, he said, "Today, I'm ending my career as a professional cyclist. I never once cheated as a cyclist." He said he would be an advisor to Team Volksbank.

The IOC has investigated whether Ullrich should be stripped of his gold medal won at the 2000 Olympic Games, which was possible because there was an eight-year deadline for investigations, and the investigation started after seven years. It was decided that there was no solid evidence against Ullrich, and that Ullrich could keep his medal.

In 2008, the German investigation was closed after a settlement, which, by German law, means Ullrich was found not guilty. The Swiss investigation was still ongoing at that time, but they closed the case in February 2010, because Ullrich was no longer member of the Swiss Cycling Federation, and so they had no jurisdiction after he retired. The UCI appealed that decision at the Court of Arbitration for Sport (CAS).

In 2010, with the doping allegations still ongoing, Ullrich was diagnosed with burnout and avoided public appearances for a few months. When Lance Armstrong announced his comeback as a professional cyclist, Ullrich made clear that he was not going to do the same.

In February 2012, Ullrich was found guilty of a doping offence by the CAS. He was retroactively banned from 22 August 2011, and all results gained since May 2005 were removed from his Palmares. Ullrich published a statement on his website that said he would not appeal the decision. He admitted that he had had contact with Fuentes, which he considered a mistake that he now regrets.

In June 2013, Ullrich went on record stating that he'd "always said that Lance wouldn't get out of it. He made too many enemies." Later that month, he admitted that he doped with the help of Spanish doctor Eufemiano Fuentes. His name was on the list of doping tests published by the French Senate on 24 July 2013 that were collected during the 1998 Tour de France and found positive for EPO when retested in 2004.

In 2023, Ullrich admitted to using performance-enhancing substances throughout his career, starting from when he turned professional in 1995 with the Telekom team.

=== Refusal to return Olympic medals ===
At the 2000 Sydney Olympics Ullrich finished 1st in the men's road race and 2nd in the men's time trial race. Unlike Armstrong, who had been stripped of his medal and had returned it, he said that he refused to return his medals if he was stripped of his finishes. In an interview with Sky Sports, he said: "Almost everyone at the time was taking performance-enhancing substances. I didn't take anything that was not taken by the others. It would only have been cheating for me if I had gotten an advantage, which was not the case. I just wanted to ensure I had an equal opportunity." To date, Ullrich has not been stripped of his finishes.

== Ullrich bicycles ==
In May 2006 Ullrich launched Jan Ullrich Collection bicycles, which he helped to develop.

The bicycles are built in a partnership with German builders Ghost Bikes.

== Personal life ==
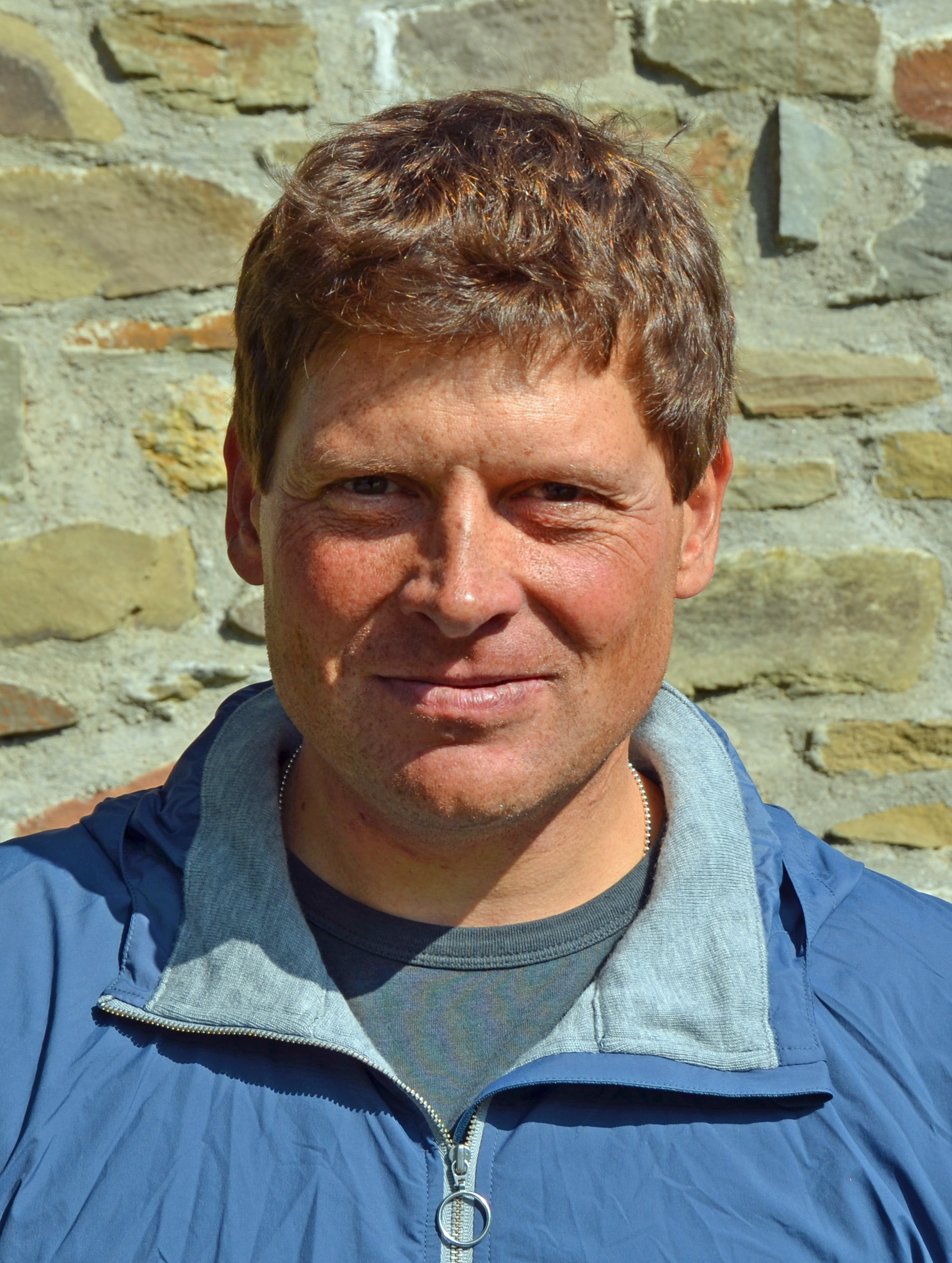
Ullrich in 2014

Ullrich lived in Merdingen, Germany, from 1994 to 2002 with his partner, Gaby Weiss, with whom he had a daughter. They moved to Scherzingen, municipality of Münsterlingen, Switzerland, in 2002. Since separating in 2005, allegedly because Weiss's reluctance to be in the media spotlight conflicted with Ullrich's celebrity life, Ullrich has continued to live in Scherzingen. Weiss returned with Sarah to Merdingen. In September 2006, Ullrich married Sara Steinhauser, the sister of his former teammate and training partner, Tobias Steinhauser. They had three children.

In 2017, Ullrich was convicted of drunk driving in Switzerland after a 2014 car crash in which two people were injured. He received a suspended sentence of four years plus a fine of €10,000. Personal issues with alcohol and drugs led to his separation from his wife, Sara, at the end of 2017.

In August 2018, Ullrich faced charges in Spain after he broke into the Mallorca home of his neighbour, the German actor and filmmaker Til Schweiger, and threatened him. An alleged attack on an escort in a Frankfurt hotel led to his admission to a psychiatric hospital. On 28 August 2019, a German court ordered him to pay a fine of €7,200.

Ullrich featured on a podcast with Lance Armstrong covering the 2021 UCI Road World Championships, in which Ullrich said that he was fully recovered from his personal difficulties but that he had almost suffered the same fate as Marco Pantani, who died following acute cocaine poisoning in 2004. Ullrich told Armstrong: "Three years ago I had big problems and then you came to see me. I was so glad you came and yes, I was just like Marco Pantani . . . nearly dead."

In 2018 Ullrich revealed that he has been diagnosed with ADHD.

== Major results ==
1993
1st Road race, UCI Amateur Road World Championships
1994
2nd Time trial, National Road Championships
3rd Time trial, UCI Road World Championships
1995
1st Time trial, National Road Championships
2nd Overall Tour du Limousin
3rd Overall Hofbräu Cup
1996
1st Overall Regio-Tour

1st Stage 3a (ITT)

2nd Road race, National Road Championships
2nd Overall Tour de France

1st Young rider classification
1st Stage 20 (ITT)

3rd Telekom Grand Prix (with Bjarne Riis)
4th Grand Prix Eddy Merckx
6th Classic Haribo
10th Tour du Haut Var
1997
1st Road race, National Road Championships
1st Overall Tour de France

1st Young rider classification
1st Stages 10 & 12 (ITT)

1st HEW Cyclassics
1st Luk-Cup Bühl
2nd Züri-Metzgete
3rd Overall Tour de Suisse

1st Stage 3

3rd Overall Ronde van Nederland
5th Klasika Primavera
7th Classique des Alpes
9th Overall Vuelta a Aragón
9th Rund um den Henninger Turm
10th Tour de Berne
1998
1st Rund um Berlin
1st Rund um die Nürnberger Altstadt
1st Sparkassen Giro Bochum
2nd Road race, National Road Championships
2nd Overall Tour de France

1st Young rider classification
1st Stages 7 (ITT), 16 & 20 (ITT)

3rd Overall Vuelta a Castilla y León
4th Overall Route du Sud
5th Overall Ronde van Nederland
9th HEW Cyclassics
10th Overall Tour de Suisse
1999
UCI Road World Championships

1st Time trial
8th Road race

1st Overall Vuelta a España

1st Stages 5 & 20 (ITT)

3rd Milano–Torino
7th Overall Ronde van Nederland
2000
Olympic Games

1st Road race
2nd Time trial

1st Coppa Ugo Agostoni
2nd Overall Tour de France
2nd Züri-Metzgete
2nd Luk-Cup Bühl
4th Road race, National Road Championships
4th Tre Valli Varesine
5th Overall Tour de Suisse

1st Stage 1 (TTT)

5th EnBW Grand Prix (with Andreas Klöden)
2001
1st Time trial, UCI Road World Championships
1st Road race, National Road Championships
1st Giro dell'Emilia
1st Stage 3 Giro della Provincia di Lucca
1st Stage 1 Hessen-Rundfahrt
2nd Overall Tour de France
2nd Züri-Metzgete
2nd Coppa Ugo Agostoni
4th Luk-Cup Bühl
5th EnBW Grand Prix (with Andreas Klöden)
8th Grand Prix Eddy Merckx
2003
1st Rund um Köln
2nd Overall Tour de France

1st Stage 12 (ITT)

2nd Züri-Metzgete
3rd HEW Cyclassics
5th Sparkassen Giro Bochum
5th Overall Deutschland Tour
6th GP du canton d'Argovie
7th Overall Tour de Suisse
2004
1st Overall Tour de Suisse

1st Points classification
1st Stages 1 & 9 (ITT)

1st Coppa Sabatini
3rd Giro del Lazio
4th Overall Tour de France
5th Giro dell'Emilia
5th Rund um die Hainleite
6th Time trial, Olympic Games
7th Overall Deutschland Tour
2005
10th Overall Circuit de la Sarthe

Voided results from May 2005 onward

~~2nd Overall Deutschland Tour~~

~~1st Stage 8 (ITT)~~

~~3rd Overall Tour de Suisse~~

~~1st Stage 2 (ITT)~~

~~3rd Overall Tour de France~~
~~10th GP Ouest–France~~
2006
~~1st Overall Tour de Suisse~~

~~1st Stage 9 (ITT)~~

~~1st Stage 11 (ITT) Giro d'Italia~~

=== Grand Tour general classification results timeline ===
Grand Tour	1995	1996	1997	1998	1999	2000	2001	2002	2003	2004	2005	2006
Giro d'Italia	—	—	—	—	—	—	52	—	—	—	—	DNF
Tour de France	—	2	1	2	—	2*	2*	—	2*	4*	~~3~~	—
Vuelta a España	DNF	—	—	—	1	DNF	—	—	—	—	—	—

Legend
—	Did not compete
DNF	Did not finish
~~No.~~	Voided result

== See also ==
- List of doping cases in cycling
- List of sportspeople sanctioned for doping offences

== Bibliography ==
- Burkert, Andreas (2003). Jan Ullrich: Wieder im Rennen (in German). Munich: Wilhelm Goldmann Verlag. ISBN 3-442-15295-X.
- Friebe, Daniel (2022). Jan Ullrich: The Best There Never Was. London: Macmillan. ISBN 978-1-5098-0157-2.
- Moll, Sebastian (2022). Ulle - Jan Ullrich: Geschichte eines tragischen Heldens (in German). Bielefeld: Delius Klasing. ISBN 978-3-667-12502-6.

Awards and achievements
Preceded by Frank Busemann	German Sportsman of the Year; 1997	Succeeded by Georg Hackl
Preceded by Sven Hannawald	German Sportsman of the Year; 2003	Succeeded by Michael Schumacher
