= Víctor Hugo Peña =

Colombian cyclist

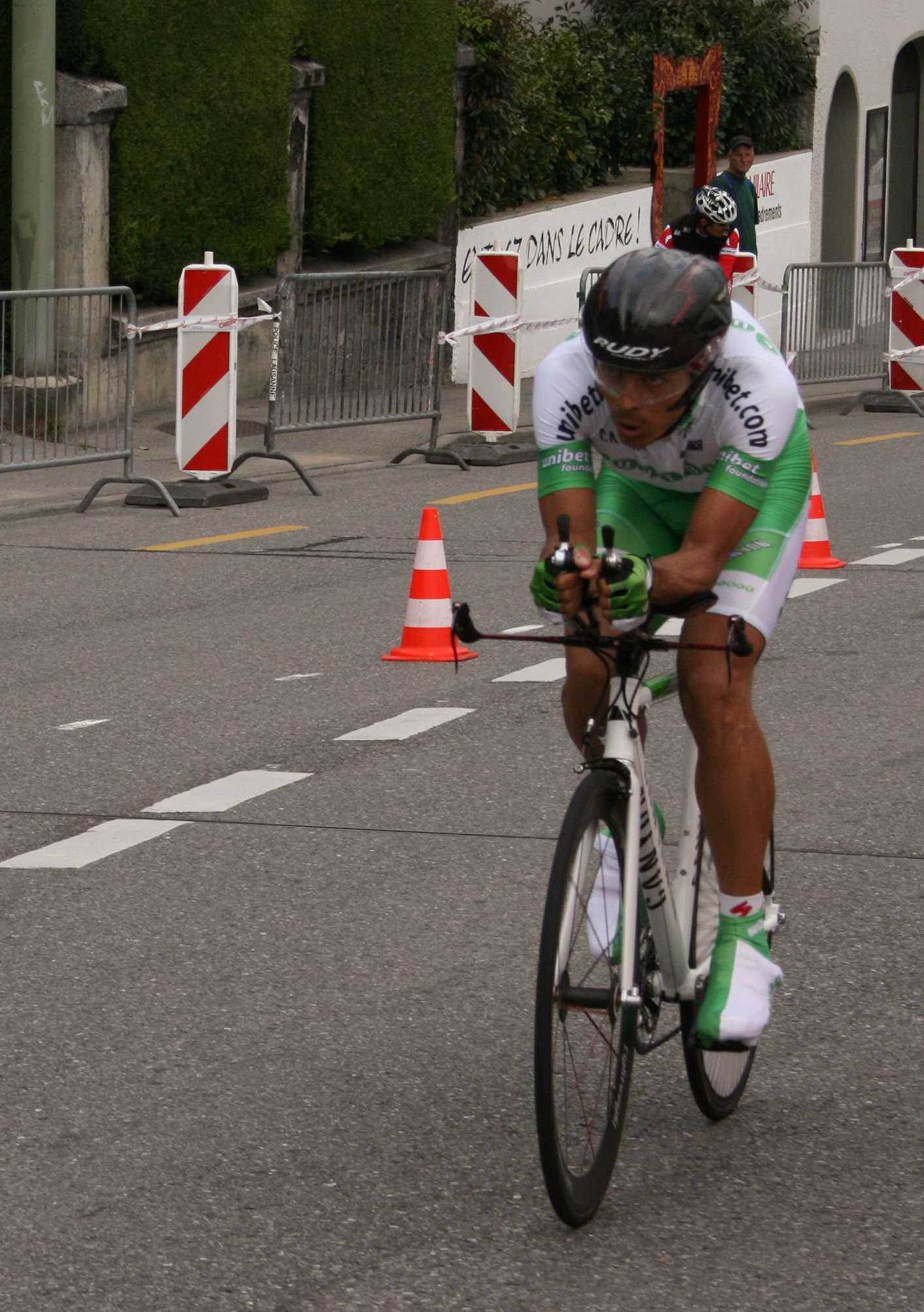

Personal information
- Full name: Víctor Hugo Peña Grisales
- Nickname: El Tiburon (the shark)
- Born: 10 July 1974 (age 52) Bogotá, Colombia
- Height: 1.78 m (5 ft 10 in)
- Weight: 65 kg (143 lb)

Cycling career
- Sport: Cycling
- Current team: Retired
- Discipline: Road
- Role: Rider
- Rider type: Time trialist, stage races

Amateur team
- 2013–2015: Supergiros–Blanco del Valle–Redetrans

Professional teams
- 1997–1998: Flavia Telecom
- 1999–2000: Vitalicio Seguros
- 2001–2004: U.S. Postal Service
- 2005–2006: Phonak
- 2007: Unibet.com
- 2008–2009: Rock Racing
- 2010–2011: Café de Colombia–Colombia es Pasión
- 2012: Colombia–Coldeportes

Major wins
- Grand Tours Tour de France 1 TTT stage (2003) Giro d'Italia 1 individual stage (2000) Vuelta a España 1 TTT stage (2004) One-day races and Classics Pan American Time Trial Championships (2000) National Time Trial Championships (1997)

Víctor Hugo Peña Grisales (born 10 July 1974 in Bogotá) is a Colombian former professional road racing cyclist. He last rode for the Colombia professional cycling team. In 2003, Peña became the first Colombian to wear the yellow jersey at the Tour de France. He held the yellow jersey for three days following the 4th, 5th and 6th stages of that year's tour.

Peña's 2003 Tour de France, where he served as a domestique for Lance Armstrong, is described in detail in Matt Rendell's book A Significant Other. The book also describes the rider's amateur and early professional career.

He is named after both his father Hugo and the author Victor Hugo. He earned his nickname "El Tiburon" ("the shark") due to his looks and the other sport he excelled at besides cycling – swimming. Peña finished 7th in the 100 meter freestyle Pan American swimming championships for juniors in 1991.

At the end of the season in 2012, Peña retired. Later, Pena was implicated in the 2012 USADA Reasoned Report into doping on the US Postal team and was concluded to work with Dr. Michele Ferrari and received blood transfusions during his Tour de France participations.

== Major results ==
1996
7th Time trial, UCI Road World Under-23 Championships
1997 (1 pro win)
1st Time trial, National Road Championships
1998
1st Mountains classification, Grand Prix du Midre Libre
1st Mountains classification, Vuelta a Castilla y Leon
8th Overall Vuelta a Colombia

1st Points classification
1st Prologue & Stage 6

10th Overall Volta a Catalunya
2000 (1)
1st Stage 11 (ITT) Giro d'Italia
2001
3rd EnBW Grand Prix
2002 (2)
1st Overall Vuelta a Murcia
3rd Overall Ronde van Nederland

1st Stage 4 (ITT)

2003 (1)
1st Stage 4 (TTT) Tour de France

Held for 3 Days

2nd Overall Volta ao Algarve
6th Overall Vuelta a Murcia

1st Stage 4

7th GP Eddy Merckx
10th Overall Ronde van Nederland
2004
1st Stage 1 (TTT) Vuelta a España
2nd Overall Volta ao Algarve
4th Overall Tour of Belgium
10th Overall Danmark Rundt
2005
10th Time trial, UCI Road World Championships
2006
9th Overall Giro d'Italia
2007
1st Sprints classification, Volta a Catalunya
3rd Duo Normand (with Gustav Larsson)
2008
1st Stage 7 Vuelta a Colombia
2009
1st Stage 12 Vuelta a Colombia
6th GP Llodio
2010
3rd Time trial, National Road Championships
2014
3rd Time trial, National Road Championships
