= Carlos Castaño (cyclist) =

Spanish cyclist (born 1979)

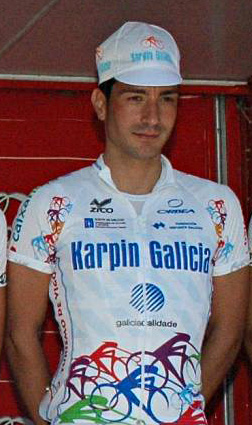
- Carlos Castaño in 2008

Personal information
- Born: 7 May 1979 (age 47) Madrid, Spain
- Height: 1.78 m (5 ft 10 in)
- Weight: 68 kg (150 lb)

Sport
- Sport: Cycling
Medal record
Representing Spain
Olympic Games
Bronze medal – third place	2004 Athens	Team pursuit
World Championships
Bronze medal – third place	2004 Melbourne	Team pursuit

Carlos Castaño Panadero (born 7 May 1979) is a retired Spanish cyclist. He had his best achievements in track cycling, in the 4000 m team pursuit. In this discipline he won a bronze medal at the 2004 Summer Olympics and at the 2004 UCI Track Cycling World Championships. He finished in 12th place in the individual pursuit at the 2004 Olympics.

In road races, he won two stages of Vuelta a Burgos in 2005, finishing third overall. In 2006 he won one stage of Volta a Catalunya.

== Major results ==
1999
10th Time trial, National Under-23 Road Championships
2001
4th Time trial, National Under-23 Road Championships
2002
Vuelta a Navarra

1st Stages 2 & 6

2005
2nd Clásica a los Puertos
3rd Overall Vuelta a Burgos

1st Stages 1 & 3 (ITT)

3rd Overall G.P. Internacional do Oeste RTP
4th Circuito de Getxo
4th Subida a Urkiola
7th GP Villafranca de Ordizia
8th Trofeo Manacor
2006
1st Stage 4 Volta a Catalunya
4th Overall Clásica Internacional de Alcobendas
7th Clásica a los Puertos
2007
3rd Overall Vuelta a la Comunidad de Madrid
4th Clásica a los Puertos
2008
6th Overall Vuelta Chihuahua Internacional
