= Hofbräu-Cup =

Annual professional cycling race in Germany

Hofbrau Cup
Race details
- Date: Secondweek of September (1988-1990); Last week of May (1992-1994); Fourth week of July (1995-2000)
- Region: Stuttgart, Germany
- Discipline: Road
- Competition: UCI Europe Tour
- Type: Stage-race

History
- First edition: 1988
- Editions: 11
- Final edition: 2000
- First winner: Bruno Cenghialta (ITA)
- Final winner: Nicola Loda (ITA)

The Schwabenbräu-Cup (1988–1990), Hofbräu-Cup (1992–1997) or Dekra Open (1999–2000) was a short professional multi-day cycling race held annually in Germany.

== Winners ==
Year	Country	Rider	Team
1988	Italy	Bruno Cenghialta	Ariostea
1989	United States	Andrew Hampsten	7-Eleven
1990	Switzerland	Stephan Joho	Ariostea
1991	No race		
1992	Italy	Alberto Elli	Ariostea
1993	Italy	Davide Rebellin	MG Bianchi
1994	Germany	Rolf Aldag	Team Telekom
1995	Italy	Gianni Faresin	Lampre-Panaria
1996	Russia	Dimitri Konyshev	AKI
1997	Italy	Fabio Roscioli	Asics–CGA
1998	No race		
1999	Italy	Dario Frigo	Saeco Macchine per Caffé
2000	Italy	Nicola Loda	Fassa Bortolo

== Stage winners ==
=== 1988 Schwabenbräu-Cup ===
Stage	Date	Route	Length	Winner
1	10 September	Stuttgart - Stuttgart	1.6 km (0.99 mi)	Rolf Gölz (FRG)
2	10 September	Stuttgart - Stuttgart		Rolf Sørensen (DEN)
3	11 September	Stuttgart - Stuttgart	188 km (117 mi)	Andreas Kappes (FRG)

=== 1989 Schwabenbräu-Cup ===
Stage	Date	Route	Length	Winner
Prologue	15 September	Stuttgart - Stuttgart	1.7 km (1.1 mi)	Patrick De Wael (BEL)
1	15 September	Stuttgart - Stuttgart		Darius Kaiser (FRG)
2	16 September	Gerlingen - Stettingen	108 km (67 mi)	Luc Roosen (BEL)
3	17 September	Vaihingen - Vaihingen	200 km (120 mi)	Nico Roose (BEL)

=== 1990 Schwabenbräu-Cup ===
Stage	Date	Route	Length	Winner
P	14 September	Schwäbisch Gmünd - Schwäbisch Gmünd	30 min. + 3 laps	Scott McKinley (USA)
1	14 September	Schwäbisch Gmünd - Schwäbisch Gmünd	24.5 km (15.2 mi)	Team Frank-Toyo
2	15 September	Gerlingen - Waiblingen	143.1 km (88.9 mi)	Fabrizio Bontempi (ITA)
3	16 September	Stuttgart - Vaihingen	212 km (132 mi)	Stephan Joho (SUI)

=== 1992 Hofbräu-Cup ===
Stage	Date	Route	Length	Winner
1	28 May	Schwäbisch Gmünd - Schwäbisch Gmünd	151 km (94 mi)	Eddy Schurer (NED)
2	29 May	Wildbad - Wildbad	125 km (78 mi)	Alberto Elli (ITA)
3a	30 May	Waiblingen - Waiblingen	51.1 km (31.8 mi)	Giuseppe Citterio (ITA)
3b	30 May	Walblingen - Walblingen	14 km (8.7 mi)	Rolf Sørensen (DEN)
4	31 May	Stuttgart - Stuttgart	195 km (121 mi)	Eric De Clercq (BEL)

=== 1993 Hofbräu-Cup ===
Stage	Date	Route	Length	Winner
1	May	Waiblingen - Waiblingen	88 km (55 mi)	Giovanni Lombardi (ITA)
2a	May	Enzklösterle - Enzklösterle	12 km (7.5 mi)	Davide Rebellin (ITA)
2b	May	Enzklösterle - Bad Wildbad	120.2 km (74.7 mi)	John Talen (NED)
3	May	Schwäbisch Gmünd - Schwäbisch Gmünd	151.8 km (94.3 mi)	Olaf Ludwig (GER)
4a	May	Stuttgart - Stuttgart	90.5 km (56.2 mi)	Johan Museeuw (BEL)
4b	May	Stuttgart - Stuttgart	44.1 km (27.4 mi)	Giovanni Lombardi (ITA)

=== 1994 Hofbräu-Cup ===
Stage	Date	Route	Length	Winner
1	25 May	Waiblingen - Waiblingen	66 km (41 mi)	Bruno Boscardin (SUI)
2	26 May	Sindelfingen - Sindelfingen	98 km (61 mi)	Rolf Aldag (GER)
3	27 May	Bad Wildbad - Bad Wildbad	201.6 km (125.3 mi)	Andrea Peron (ITA)
4	28 May	Ludwigsburg - Ludwigsburg	162.1 km (100.7 mi)	Gianvito Martinelli (ITA)
5	29 May	Stuttgart - Stuttgart	110 km (68 mi)	Jeroen Blijlevens (NED)

=== 1995 Hofbräu-Cup ===
Stage	Date	Route	Length	Winner
1	20 July	Sindelfingen - Sindelfingen	100.2 km (62.3 mi)	
2	21 July	Waiblingen - Waiblingen	93.5 km (58.1 mi)	Andreas Kappes (GER)
3	22 July	Ludwigsburg - Ludwigsburg	188 km (117 mi)	Gianni Faresin (ITA)
4	23 July	Esslingen - Esslingen	46.5 km (28.9 mi)	Marco Saligari (ITA)
5	24 July	Esslingen - Stuttgart	88 km (55 mi)	Hendrik Van Dyck (BEL)

=== 1996 Hofbräu-Cup ===
Stage	Date	Route	Length	Winner
1	18 July	Gerlingen - Gerlingen	140 km (87 mi)	Dmitri Konychev (RUS)
2	19 July	Waiblinger Speiche - Waiblinger Speiche	121.6 km (75.6 mi)	Mario Scirea (ITA)
3	20 July	Ludwigsburg - Ludwigsburg	191.4 km (118.9 mi)	Johan Bruyneel (BEL)
4	21 July	Esslingen - Stuttgart	195.3 km (121.4 mi)	Dmitri Konychev

=== 1997 Hofbräu-Cup ===
Stage	Date	Route	Length	Winner
Prologue	23 July	Waiblingen - Waiblingen	78 km (48 mi)	Kurt Van De Wouwer (BEL)
1	24 July	Gärtringen - Gärtringen	166.5 km (103.5 mi)	Juris Silovs (LAT)
2	25 July	Enzklösterle - Bad Wildbach	15.1 km (9.4 mi)	Paolo Bettini (ITA)
3	26 July	Ludwigsburg - Ludwigsburg	192.8 km (119.8 mi)	Kurt Van De Wouwer
4	27 July	Esslingen - Stuttgart	211 km (131 mi)	Paolo Savoldelli (ITA)

=== 1999 Dekra Open ===
Stage	Date	Route	Length	Winner
Prologue	17 July	Stuttgart - Vaihingen	6.5 km (4.0 mi)	Michael Blaudzun (DEN)
1	17 July	Altensteig - Wart	156 km (97 mi)	Dario Frigo (ITA)
2	18 July	Esslingen - Stuttgart	210 km (130 mi)	René Haselbacher (AUT)

=== 2000 Dekra Open ===
Stage	Date	Route	Length	Winner
1	21 July	Metzingen - Metzingen	154 km (96 mi)	Nicola Loda (ITA)
2	22 July	Esslingen - Stuttgart/Schlossplatz	174.8 km (108.6 mi)	Bjorn Leukemans (BEL)
3	23 July	Altensteig - Altensteig	184.1 km (114.4 mi)	Erwin Thijs (BEL)
