= Javier Pascual Llorente =

Spanish cyclist

Personal information
- Born: 30 March 1971 (age 55) Alfaro, La Rioja

Cycling career
- Sport: Cycling
- Current team: Retired
- Discipline: Road
- Role: Rider

Amateur team
- 1992-1994: Banesto (stagiaire)

Professional teams
- 1995-1996: Santa Clara
- 1997-1998: Telecom-Flavia
- 1999-2005: Kelme

Javier Pascual Llorente (born 30 March 1971 in Alfaro, La Rioja) is a former Spanish cyclist.

== Palmarès ==
1998
5th stage Vuelta a Colombia
2000
1st stage Volta a la Comunitat Valenciana
2nd overall Vuelta a Murcia
2001
1st and 5th stages Vuelta a Castilla y León
2nd overall Vuelta a Murcia
10th overall Clásica de San Sebastián
2003
Vuelta a Murcia:

General classification
2nd and 5th stages

Vuelta a Andalucía:

General classification
3rd stage

3rd overall Volta a la Comunitat Valenciana
