= 2000 Tour de France, Stage 12 to Stage 21 =

Stage of cycling race

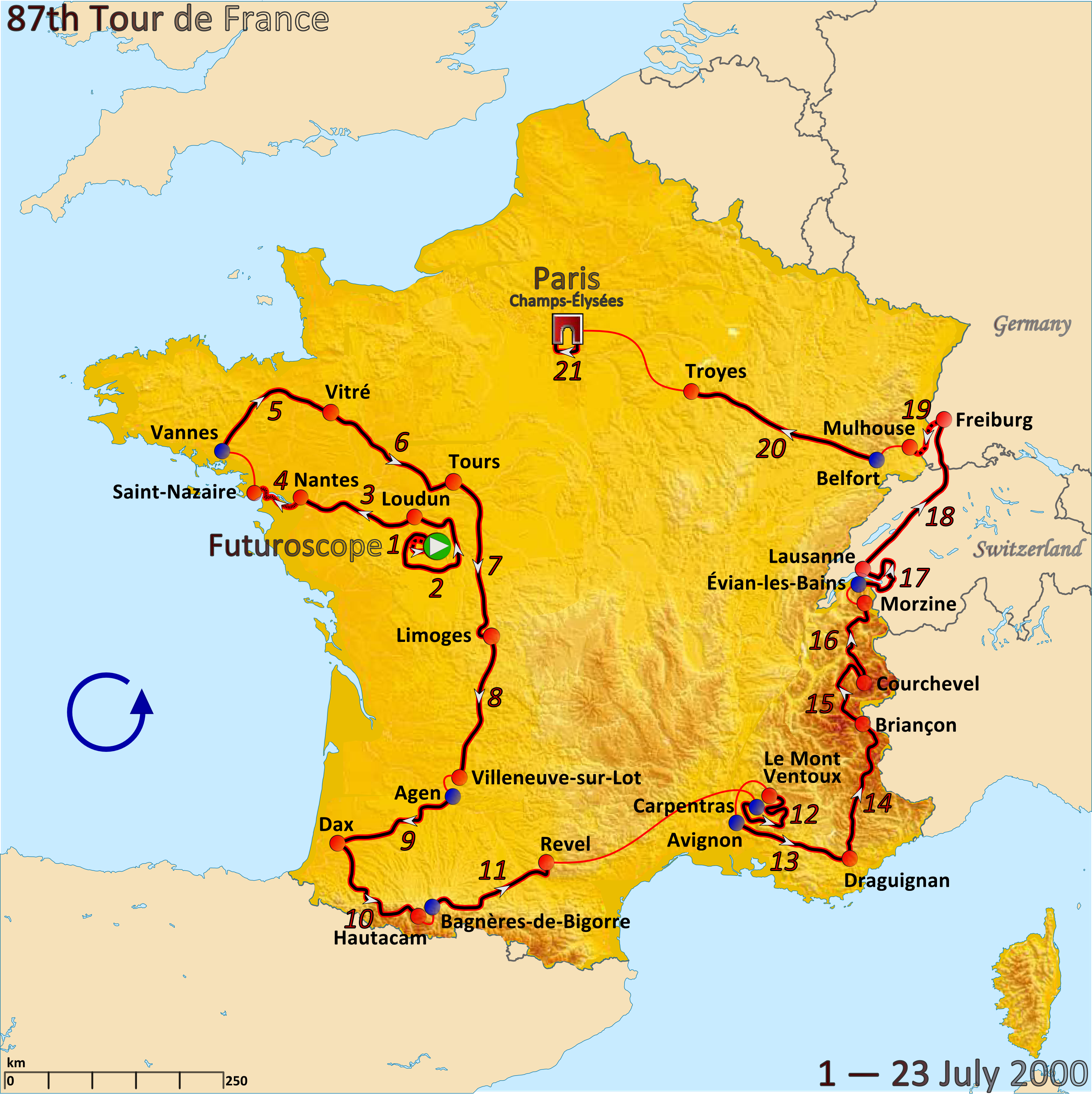
Route of the 2000 Tour de France

The 2000 Tour de France was the 87th edition of Tour de France, one of cycling's Grand Tours. The Tour began in Futuroscope with a prologue individual time trial on 1 July and Stage 12 occurred on 13 July with a mountainous stage from Carpentras. The race finished on the Champs-Élysées in Paris on 23 July.

== Stage 12 ==
13 July 2000 — Carpentras to Mont Ventoux, 149 km (92.6 mi)

Stage 12 result

Rank	Cyclist	Team	Time
1	Marco Pantani (ITA)	Mercatone Uno–Albacom	4:15:11
~~2~~	~~Lance Armstrong (USA)~~	~~U.S. Postal Service~~	~~s.t.~~
3	Joseba Beloki (ESP)	Festina	+ 25"
4	Jan Ullrich (GER)	Team Telekom	+ 29"
5	Santiago Botero (COL)	Kelme–Costa Blanca	+ 48"
6	Roberto Heras (ESP)	Kelme–Costa Blanca	s.t.
7	Richard Virenque (FRA)	Team Polti	+ 1' 17"
8	Francisco Mancebo (ESP)	Banesto	+ 1' 23"
9	Manuel Beltrán (ESP)	Mapei–Quick-Step	+ 1' 29"
10	Christophe Moreau (FRA)	Festina	+ 1' 31"

General classification after stage 12

Rank	Cyclist	Team	Time
~~1~~	~~Lance Armstrong (USA)~~	~~U.S. Postal Service~~	~~48:50:21~~
2	Jan Ullrich (GER)	Team Telekom	+ 4' 55"
3	Joseba Beloki (ESP)	Festina	+ 5' 52"
4	Christophe Moreau (FRA)	Festina	+ 6' 53"
5	Manuel Beltrán (ESP)	Mapei–Quick-Step	+ 7' 25"
6	Richard Virenque (FRA)	Team Polti	+ 8' 28"
7	Roberto Heras (ESP)	Kelme–Costa Blanca	+ 8' 33"
8	Francisco Mancebo (ESP)	Mapei–Quick-Step	+ 9' 42"
9	Javier Otxoa (ESP)	Team Telekom	+ 9' 46"
10	Peter Luttenberger (AUT)	Vitalicio Seguros	+ 10' 01"

== Stage 13 ==
14 July 2000 — Avignon to Draguignan, 185.5 km (115.3 mi)

Stage 13 result

Rank	Cyclist	Team	Time
1	José Vicente García (ESP)	Banesto	4:03:02
2	Nicolas Jalabert (FRA)	ONCE–Deutsche Bank	+ 25"
3	Pascal Hervé (FRA)	Team Polti	+ 27"
4	Guido Trentin (ITA)	Vini Caldirola–Sidermec	+ 57"
5	Stéphane Heulot (FRA)	Française des Jeux	s.t.
6	Robbie McEwen (AUS)	Farm Frites	+ 4' 00"
7	François Simon (FRA)	Bonjour	s.t.
8	Anthony Morin (FRA)	Crédit Agricole	s.t.
9	Christophe Agnolutto (FRA)	AG2R Prévoyance	s.t.
10	Marc Wauters (BEL)	Rabobank	s.t.

General classification after stage 13

Rank	Cyclist	Team	Time
~~1~~	~~Lance Armstrong (USA)~~	~~U.S. Postal Service~~	~~53:03:29~~
2	Jan Ullrich (GER)	Team Telekom	+ 4' 55"
3	Joseba Beloki (ESP)	Festina	+ 5' 52"
4	Marc Wauters (BEL)	Rabobank	+ 6' 03"
5	Christophe Moreau (FRA)	Festina	+ 6' 33"
6	Manuel Beltrán (ESP)	Mapei–Quick-Step	+ 7' 25"
7	Richard Virenque (FRA)	Team Polti	+ 8' 28"
8	Roberto Heras (ESP)	Kelme–Costa Blanca	+ 8' 33"
9	Francisco Mancebo (ESP)	Mapei–Quick-Step	+ 9' 42"
10	Javier Otxoa (ESP)	Team Telekom	+ 9' 46"

== Stage 14 ==
15 July 2000 — Draguignan to Briançon, 249 km (155 mi)

Stage 14 result

Rank	Cyclist	Team	Time
1	Santiago Botero (COL)	Kelme–Costa Blanca	7:56:13
2	Paolo Savoldelli (ITA)	Saeco–Valli & Valli	+ 2' 30"
3	Marco Pantani (ITA)	Mercatone Uno–Albacom	+ 2' 46"
4	Fernando Escartín (ESP)	Kelme–Costa Blanca	+ 2' 49"
5	Richard Virenque (FRA)	Team Polti	s.t.
6	Christophe Moreau (FRA)	Crédit Agricole	s.t.
~~7~~	~~Lance Armstrong (USA)~~	~~U.S. Postal Service~~	~~+ 2' 51"~~
8	Roberto Heras (ESP)	Kelme–Costa Blanca	s.t.
9	Jan Ullrich (GER)	Team Telekom	s.t.
10	Joseba Beloki (ESP)	Festina	s.t.

General classification after stage 14

Rank	Cyclist	Team	Time
~~1~~	~~Lance Armstrong (USA)~~	~~U.S. Postal Service~~	~~61:02:33~~
2	Jan Ullrich (GER)	Team Telekom	+ 4' 55"
3	Joseba Beloki (ESP)	Festina	+ 5' 52"
4	Christophe Moreau (FRA)	Festina	+ 6' 51"
5	Richard Virenque (FRA)	Team Polti	+ 8' 26"
6	Roberto Heras (ESP)	Kelme–Costa Blanca	+ 8' 33"
7	Manuel Beltrán (ESP)	Mapei–Quick-Step	+ 9' 33"
8	Santiago Botero (COL)	Kelme–Costa Blanca	+ 10' 00"
9	Marco Pantani (ITA)	Mercatone Uno–Albacom	+ 10' 13"
10	Francisco Mancebo (ESP)	Banesto	+ 10' 17"

== Stage 15 ==
16 July 2000 — Briançon to Courchevel, 173.5 km (107.8 mi)

Stage 15 result

Rank	Cyclist	Team	Time
1	Marco Pantani (ITA)	Mercatone Uno–Albacom	5:34:46
2	José María Jiménez (ESP)	Banesto	+ 41"
3	Roberto Heras (ESP)	Kelme–Costa Blanca	+ 50"
~~4~~	~~Lance Armstrong (USA)~~	~~U.S. Postal Service~~	~~s.t.~~
5	Daniele Nardello (ITA)	Mapei–Quick-Step	+ 1' 00"
6	Santiago Botero (COL)	Kelme–Costa Blanca	+ 1' 09"
7	Massimiliano Lelli (ITA)	Cofidis	+ 2' 17"
8	Fernando Escartín (ESP)	Kelme–Costa Blanca	+ 2' 21"
9	Christophe Moreau (FRA)	Festina	s.t.
10	Richard Virenque (FRA)	Team Polti	s.t.

General classification after stage 15

Rank	Cyclist	Team	Time
~~1~~	~~Lance Armstrong (USA)~~	~~U.S. Postal Service~~	~~66:38:09~~
2	Jan Ullrich (GER)	Team Telekom	+ 7' 26"
3	Joseba Beloki (ESP)	Festina	+ 7' 28"
4	Christophe Moreau (FRA)	Festina	+ 8' 22"
5	Roberto Heras (ESP)	Kelme–Costa Blanca	+ 8' 25"
6	Marco Pantani (ITA)	Mercatone Uno–Albacom	+ 9' 03"
7	Richard Virenque (FRA)	Team Polti	+ 9' 57"
8	Santiago Botero (COL)	Kelme–Costa Blanca	+ 10' 19"
9	Fernando Escartín (ESP)	Kelme–Costa Blanca	+ 12' 27"
10	Francisco Mancebo (ESP)	Banesto	+ 12' 43"

== Stage 16 ==
18 July 2000 — Courchevel to Morzine, 196 km (122 mi)

Stage 16 result

Rank	Cyclist	Team	Time
1	Richard Virenque (FRA)	Team Polti	5:32:20
2	Jan Ullrich (GER)	Team Telekom	+ 24"
3	Roberto Heras (ESP)	Kelme–Costa Blanca	+ 27"
4	Fernando Escartín (ESP)	Kelme–Costa Blanca	+ 1' 09"
5	Joseba Beloki (ESP)	Festina	+ 1' 11"
6	Pascal Hervé (FRA)	Team Polti	s.t.
7	Guido Trentin (ITA)	Vini Caldirola–Sidermec	+ 2' 01"
~~8~~	~~Lance Armstrong (USA)~~	~~U.S. Postal Service~~	~~s.t.~~
9	Christophe Moreau (FRA)	Festina	s.t.
10	Santiago Botero (COL)	Kelme–Costa Blanca	s.t.

General classification after stage 16

Rank	Cyclist	Team	Time
~~1~~	~~Lance Armstrong (USA)~~	~~U.S. Postal Service~~	~~72:12:30~~
2	Jan Ullrich (GER)	Team Telekom	+ 5' 37"
3	Joseba Beloki (ESP)	Festina	+ 6' 38"
4	Roberto Heras (ESP)	Kelme–Costa Blanca	+ 6' 43"
5	Richard Virenque (FRA)	Team Polti	+ 7' 36"
6	Christophe Moreau (FRA)	Festina	+ 8' 22"
7	Santiago Botero (COL)	Kelme–Costa Blanca	+ 10' 19"
8	Fernando Escartín (ESP)	Kelme–Costa Blanca	+ 11' 35"
9	Francisco Mancebo (ESP)	Banesto	+ 13' 07"
10	Manuel Beltrán (ESP)	Mapei–Quick-Step	+ 13' 08"

== Stage 17 ==
19 July 2000 — Évian-les-Bains to Lausanne, 155 km (96 mi)

Stage 17 result

Rank	Cyclist	Team	Time
1	Erik Dekker (NED)	Rabobank	3:24:53
2	Erik Zabel (GER)	Team Telekom	s.t.
3	Fred Rodriguez (USA)	Mapei–Quick-Step	s.t.
4	François Simon (FRA)	Bonjour	s.t.
5	Robbie McEwen (AUS)	Farm Frites	s.t.
6	Mario Aerts (BEL)	Lotto–Adecco	s.t.
7	Massimiliano Mori (ITA)	Saeco–Valli & Valli	s.t.
8	Romāns Vainšteins (LAT)	Vini Caldirola–Sidermec	s.t.
9	Nico Mattan (BEL)	Cofidis	s.t.
10	Christophe Moreau (FRA)	Festina	s.t.

General classification after stage 17

Rank	Cyclist	Team	Time
~~1~~	~~Lance Armstrong (USA)~~	~~U.S. Postal Service~~	~~75:37:23~~
2	Jan Ullrich (GER)	Team Telekom	+ 5' 37"
3	Joseba Beloki (ESP)	Festina	+ 6' 38"
4	Roberto Heras (ESP)	Kelme–Costa Blanca	+ 6' 43"
5	Richard Virenque (FRA)	Team Polti	+ 7' 36"
6	Christophe Moreau (FRA)	Festina	+ 8' 22"
7	Santiago Botero (COL)	Kelme–Costa Blanca	+ 10' 19"
8	Fernando Escartín (ESP)	Kelme–Costa Blanca	+ 11' 35"
9	Francisco Mancebo (ESP)	Banesto	+ 13' 07"
10	Manuel Beltrán (ESP)	Mapei–Quick-Step	+ 13' 08"

== Stage 18 ==
20 July 2000 — Lausanne to Freiburg (Germany), 246.5 km (153.2 mi)

Stage 18 result

Rank	Cyclist	Team	Time
1	Salvatore Commesso (ITA)	Saeco–Valli & Valli	6:08:15
2	Alexander Vinokourov (KAZ)	Team Telekom	s.t.
3	Jacky Durand (FRA)	Lotto–Adecco	+ 1' 05"
4	Jens Voigt (GER)	Crédit Agricole	+ 1' 16"
5	Jean-Cyril Robin (FRA)	Bonjour	s.t.
6	Nicolaj Bo Larsen (DEN)	Memory Card–Jack & Jones	+ 15' 35"
7	Servais Knaven (NED)	Farm Frites	s.t.
8	Thierry Marichal (BEL)	Lotto–Adecco	s.t.
9	Olivier Perraudeau (FRA)	Bonjour	s.t.
10	Bo Hamburger (DEN)	Memory Card–Jack & Jones	+ 15' 37"

General classification after stage 18

Rank	Cyclist	Team	Time
~~1~~	~~Lance Armstrong (USA)~~	~~U.S. Postal Service~~	~~82:01:18~~
2	Jan Ullrich (GER)	Team Telekom	+ 5' 37"
3	Joseba Beloki (ESP)	Festina	+ 6' 38"
4	Roberto Heras (ESP)	Kelme–Costa Blanca	+ 6' 43"
5	Richard Virenque (FRA)	Team Polti	+ 7' 36"
6	Christophe Moreau (FRA)	Festina	+ 8' 22"
7	Santiago Botero (COL)	Kelme–Costa Blanca	+ 10' 19"
8	Fernando Escartín (ESP)	Kelme–Costa Blanca	+ 11' 35"
9	Francisco Mancebo (ESP)	Banesto	+ 13' 07"
10	Manuel Beltrán (ESP)	Mapei–Quick-Step	+ 13' 08"

== Stage 19 ==
21 July 2000 — Freiburg (Germany) to Mulhouse, 58.5 km (36.4 mi) (individual time trial)

Stage 19 result

Rank	Cyclist	Team	Time
~~1~~	~~Lance Armstrong (USA)~~	~~U.S. Postal Service~~	~~1:05:01~~
2	Jan Ullrich (GER)	Team Telekom	+ 25"
3	Christophe Moreau (FRA)	Festina	+ 2' 12"
4	Tyler Hamilton (USA)	U.S. Postal Service	+ 3' 01"
5	Joseba Beloki (ESP)	Festina	+ 3' 26"
6	Laurent Jalabert (FRA)	ONCE–Deutsche Bank	+ 3' 47"
7	David Millar (GBR)	Cofidis	+ 3' 56"
8	Daniele Nardello (ITA)	Mapei–Quick-Step	+ 3' 57"
9	Santiago Botero (COL)	Kelme–Costa Blanca	+ 3' 59"
10	Guido Trentin (ITA)	Vini Caldirola–Sidermec	+ 4' 16"

General classification after stage 19

Rank	Cyclist	Team	Time
~~1~~	~~Lance Armstrong (USA)~~	~~U.S. Postal Service~~	~~83:06:19~~
2	Jan Ullrich (GER)	Team Telekom	+ 6' 02"
3	Joseba Beloki (ESP)	Festina	+ 10' 04"
4	Christophe Moreau (FRA)	Festina	+ 10' 34"
5	Roberto Heras (ESP)	Kelme–Costa Blanca	+ 11' 50"
6	Richard Virenque (FRA)	Team Polti	+ 13' 26"
7	Santiago Botero (COL)	Kelme–Costa Blanca	+ 14' 18"
8	Fernando Escartín (ESP)	Kelme–Costa Blanca	+ 17' 21"
9	Francisco Mancebo (ESP)	Banesto	+ 18' 09"
10	Daniele Nardello (ITA)	Mapei–Quick-Step	+ 18' 25"

== Stage 20 ==
22 July 2000 — Belfort to Troyes, 254.5 km (158.1 mi)

Stage 20 result

Rank	Cyclist	Team	Time
1	Erik Zabel (GER)	Team Telekom	6:14:13
2	Robbie McEwen (AUS)	Farm Frites	s.t.
3	Jeroen Blijlevens (NED)	Team Polti	s.t.
4	Romāns Vainšteins (LAT)	Vini Caldirola–Sidermec	s.t.
5	Max van Heeswijk (NED)	Mapei–Quick-Step	s.t.
6	Massimiliano Mori (ITA)	Saeco–Valli & Valli	s.t.
7	Arvis Piziks (LAT)	Memory Card–Jack & Jones	s.t.
8	Emmanuel Magnien (FRA)	Française des Jeux	s.t.
9	George Hincapie (USA)	U.S. Postal Service	s.t.
10	Christophe Mengin (FRA)	Française des Jeux	s.t.

General classification after stage 20

Rank	Cyclist	Team	Time
~~1~~	~~Lance Armstrong (USA)~~	~~U.S. Postal Service~~	~~83:06:19~~
2	Jan Ullrich (GER)	Team Telekom	+ 6' 02"
3	Joseba Beloki (ESP)	Festina	+ 10' 04"
4	Christophe Moreau (FRA)	Festina	+ 10' 34"
5	Roberto Heras (ESP)	Kelme–Costa Blanca	+ 11' 50"
6	Richard Virenque (FRA)	Team Polti	+ 13' 26"
7	Santiago Botero (COL)	Kelme–Costa Blanca	+ 14' 18"
8	Fernando Escartín (ESP)	Kelme–Costa Blanca	+ 17' 21"
9	Francisco Mancebo (ESP)	Banesto	+ 18' 09"
10	Daniele Nardello (ITA)	Mapei–Quick-Step	+ 18' 25"

== Stage 21 ==
23 July 2000 — Paris (Eiffel Tower) to Paris (Champs-Élysées), 138 km (86 mi)

Stage 21 result

Rank	Cyclist	Team	Time
1	Stefano Zanini (ITA)	Mapei–Quick-Step	3:12:36
2	Erik Zabel (GER)	Team Telekom	s.t.
3	Romāns Vainšteins (LAT)	Vini Caldirola–Sidermec	s.t.
4	Fred Rodriguez (USA)	Mapei–Quick-Step	s.t.
5	Max van Heeswijk (NED)	Mapei–Quick-Step	s.t.
6	Emmanuel Magnien (FRA)	Française des Jeux	s.t.
7	François Simon (FRA)	Bonjour	s.t.
8	Robbie McEwen (AUS)	Farm Frites	s.t.
9	Salvatore Commesso (ITA)	Saeco–Valli & Valli	s.t.
10	Arvis Piziks (LAT)	Memory Card–Jack & Jones	s.t.

General classification after stage 21

Rank	Cyclist	Team	Time
~~1~~	~~Lance Armstrong (USA)~~	~~U.S. Postal Service~~	~~92:33:08~~
2	Jan Ullrich (GER)	Team Telekom	+ 6' 02"
3	Joseba Beloki (ESP)	Festina	+ 10' 04"
4	Christophe Moreau (FRA)	Festina	+ 10' 34"
5	Roberto Heras (ESP)	Kelme–Costa Blanca	+ 11' 50"
6	Richard Virenque (FRA)	Team Polti	+ 13' 26"
7	Santiago Botero (COL)	Kelme–Costa Blanca	+ 14' 18"
8	Fernando Escartín (ESP)	Kelme–Costa Blanca	+ 17' 21"
9	Francisco Mancebo (ESP)	Banesto	+ 18' 09"
10	Daniele Nardello (ITA)	Mapei–Quick-Step	+ 18' 25"
