= 2000 Tour de France, Stage 1 to Stage 11 =

Cycling race stages

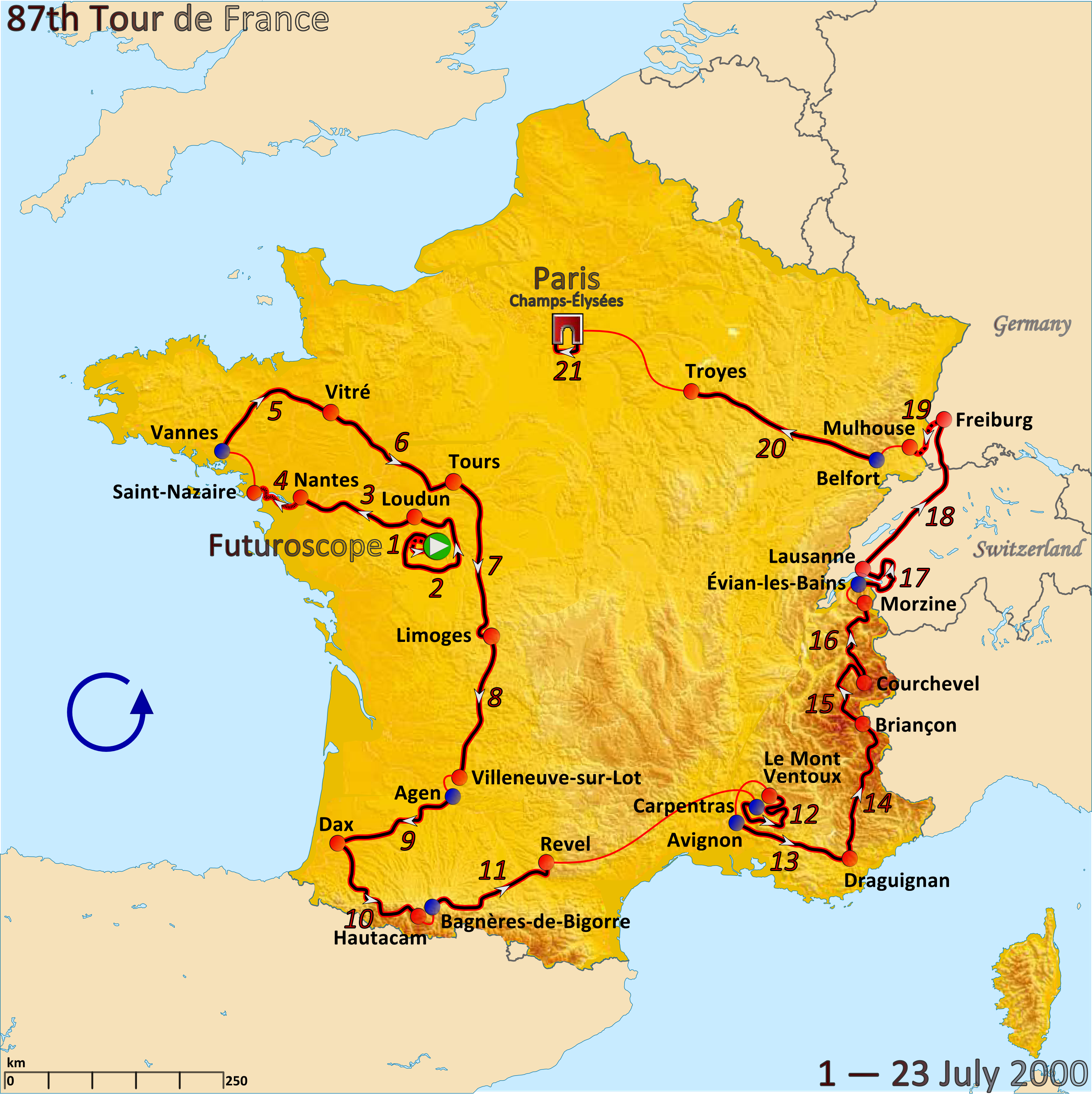
Route of the 2000 Tour de France

The 2000 Tour de France was the 87th edition of Tour de France, one of cycling's Grand Tours. The Tour began in Futuroscope with a prologue individual time trial on 1 July and Stage 11 occurred on 11 July with a hilly stage to Revel. The race finished on the Champs-Élysées in Paris on 23 July.

== Stage 1 ==
1 July 2000 — Futuroscope, 16.5 km (10.3 mi) (individual time trial)

Stage 1 result and general classification after stage 1

Rank	Rider	Team	Time
1	David Millar (GBR)	Cofidis	19' 03"
~~2~~	~~Lance Armstrong (USA)~~	~~U.S. Postal Service~~	~~+ 2"~~
3	Laurent Jalabert (FRA)	ONCE–Deutsche Bank	+ 13"
4	Jan Ullrich (GER)	Team Telekom	+ 14"
5	David Cañada (ESP)	ONCE–Deutsche Bank	+ 16"
6	Alex Zülle (SUI)	Banesto	+ 20"
7	Viatcheslav Ekimov (RUS)	U.S. Postal Service	+ 21"
8	Simone Borgheresi (ITA)	Mercatone Uno–Albacom	+ 27"
9	Tyler Hamilton (USA)	U.S. Postal Service	+ 33"
10	Erik Dekker (NED)	Rabobank	+ 36"

== Stage 2 ==
2 July 2000 — Futuroscope to Loudun, 194 km (120.5 mi)

Stage 2 result

Rank	Rider	Team	Time
1	Tom Steels (BEL)	Mapei–Quick-Step	4h 46' 08"
2	Stuart O'Grady (AUS)	Crédit Agricole	s.t.
3	Erik Zabel (GER)	Team Telekom	s.t.
4	Romāns Vainšteins (LAT)	Vini Caldirola–Sidermec	s.t.
5	Marcel Wüst (GER)	Festina	s.t.
6	Dario Pieri (ITA)	Saeco–Valli & Valli	s.t.
7	Robbie McEwen (AUS)	Farm Frites	s.t.
8	Zoran Klemenčič (SLO)	Vini Caldirola–Sidermec	s.t.
9	François Simon (FRA)	Bonjour	s.t.
10	Jans Koerts (NED)	Farm Frites	s.t.

General classification after stage 2

Rank	Rider	Team	Time
1	David Millar (GBR)	Cofidis	5h 05' 09"
~~2~~	~~Lance Armstrong (USA)~~	~~U.S. Postal Service~~	~~+ 4"~~
3	Laurent Jalabert (FRA)	ONCE–Deutsche Bank	+ 15"
4	Jan Ullrich (GER)	Team Telekom	+ 16"
5	David Cañada (ESP)	ONCE–Deutsche Bank	+ 18"
6	Alex Zülle (SUI)	Banesto	+ 22"
7	Viatcheslav Ekimov (RUS)	U.S. Postal Service	+ 23"
8	Simone Borgheresi (ITA)	Mercatone Uno–Albacom	+ 29"
9	Tyler Hamilton (USA)	U.S. Postal Service	+ 35"
10	Abraham Olano (ESP)	ONCE–Deutsche Bank	+ 41"

== Stage 3 ==
3 July 2000 — Loudun to Nantes, 161.5 km (100.4 mi)

Stage 3 result

Rank	Rider	Team	Time
1	Tom Steels (BEL)	Mapei–Quick-Step	3h 37' 51"
2	Marcel Wüst (GER)	Festina	s.t.
3	Erik Zabel (GER)	Team Telekom	s.t.
4	Jans Koerts (NED)	Farm Frites	s.t.
5	Stuart O'Grady (AUS)	Crédit Agricole	s.t.
6	Damien Nazon (FRA)	Bonjour	s.t.
7	François Simon (FRA)	Bonjour	s.t.
8	Jaan Kirsipuu (EST)	AG2R Prévoyance	s.t.
9	Romāns Vainšteins (LAT)	Vini Caldirola–Sidermec	s.t.
10	Dario Pieri (ITA)	Saeco–Valli & Valli	s.t.

General classification after stage 3

Rank	Rider	Team	Time
1	David Millar (GBR)	Cofidis	8h 43' 09"
~~2~~	~~Lance Armstrong (USA)~~	~~U.S. Postal Service~~	~~+ 4"~~
3	Laurent Jalabert (FRA)	ONCE–Deutsche Bank	+ 6"
4	Jan Ullrich (GER)	Team Telekom	+ 7"
5	David Cañada (ESP)	ONCE–Deutsche Bank	+ 18"
6	Alex Zülle (SUI)	Banesto	+ 22"
7	Viatcheslav Ekimov (RUS)	U.S. Postal Service	+ 23"
8	Simone Borgheresi (ITA)	Mercatone Uno–Albacom	+ 29"
9	Jens Voigt (GER)	Crédit Agricole	+ 30"
10	Tyler Hamilton (USA)	U.S. Postal Service	+ 35"

== Stage 4 ==
4 July 2000 — Nantes to Saint-Nazaire, 70 km (43 mi) (team time trial)

Stage 4 result

Rank	Team	Time
1	ONCE–Deutsche Bank	1h 25' 55"
2	U.S. Postal Service	+ 26"
3	Team Telekom	+ 1' 06"
4	Crédit Agricole	+ 1' 12"
5	Rabobank	+ 1' 52"
6	Festina	+ 1' 56"
7	Cofidis	+ 2' 33"
8	Mapei–Quick-Step	+ 2' 58"
9	Mercatone Uno–Albacom	+ 3' 14"
10	Memory Card–Jack & Jones	+ 3' 49"

General classification after stage 4

Rank	Rider	Team	Time
1	Laurent Jalabert (FRA)	ONCE–Deutsche Bank	10h 09' 10"
2	David Cañada (ESP)	ONCE–Deutsche Bank	+ 12"
~~3~~	~~Lance Armstrong (USA)~~	~~U.S. Postal Service~~	~~+ 24"~~
4	Abraham Olano (ESP)	ONCE–Deutsche Bank	+ 35"
5	Viatcheslav Ekimov (RUS)	U.S. Postal Service	+ 43"
6	Nicolas Jalabert (FRA)	ONCE–Deutsche Bank	+ 49"
7	Iván Gutiérrez (ESP)	ONCE–Deutsche Bank	s.t.
8	Marcos-Antonio Serrano (ESP)	ONCE–Deutsche Bank	+ 52"
9	Miguel Ángel Peña (ESP)	ONCE–Deutsche Bank	+ 54"
10	Tyler Hamilton (USA)	U.S. Postal Service	+ 55"

== Stage 5 ==
5 July 2000 — Vannes to Vitré, 202 km (126 mi)

Stage 5 result

Rank	Rider	Team	Time
1	Marcel Wüst (GER)	Festina	4h 19' 05"
2	Erik Zabel (GER)	Team Telekom	s.t.
3	Stefano Zanini (ITA)	Mapei–Quick-Step	s.t.
4	Tom Steels (BEL)	Mapei–Quick-Step	s.t.
5	Salvatore Commesso (ITA)	Saeco–Valli & Valli	s.t.
6	Robbie McEwen (AUS)	Farm Frites	s.t.
7	Jans Koerts (NED)	Farm Frites	s.t.
8	Stuart O'Grady (AUS)	Crédit Agricole	s.t.
9	Romāns Vainšteins (LAT)	Vini Caldirola–Sidermec	s.t.
10	Emmanuel Magnien (FRA)	Française des Jeux	s.t.

General classification after stage 5

Rank	Rider	Team	Time
1	Laurent Jalabert (FRA)	ONCE–Deutsche Bank	14h 28' 25"
2	David Cañada (ESP)	ONCE–Deutsche Bank	+ 12"
~~3~~	~~Lance Armstrong (USA)~~	~~U.S. Postal Service~~	~~+ 14"~~
4	Abraham Olano (ESP)	ONCE–Deutsche Bank	+ 33"
5	Viatcheslav Ekimov (RUS)	U.S. Postal Service	+ 43"
6	Nicolas Jalabert (FRA)	ONCE–Deutsche Bank	+ 49"
7	Iván Gutiérrez (ESP)	ONCE–Deutsche Bank	s.t.
8	Peter Luttenberger (AUT)	ONCE–Deutsche Bank	+ 51"
9	Marcos-Antonio Serrano (ESP)	ONCE–Deutsche Bank	+ 52"
10	Miguel Ángel Peña (ESP)	ONCE–Deutsche Bank	+ 54"

== Stage 6 ==
6 July 2000 — Vitré to Tours, 198.5 km (123.3 mi)

Stage 6 result

Rank	Rider	Team	Time
1	Léon van Bon (NED)	Rabobank	4h 28' 06"
2	Markus Zberg (SUI)	Rabobank	s.t.
3	Emmanuel Magnien (FRA)	Française des Jeux	s.t.
4	Servais Knaven (NED)	Farm Frites	s.t.
5	Arvis Piziks (LAT)	Memory Card–Jack & Jones	s.t.
6	Alberto Elli (ITA)	Team Telekom	s.t.
7	Fabrice Gougot (FRA)	Crédit Agricole	s.t.
8	Salvatore Commesso (ITA)	Saeco–Valli & Valli	s.t.
9	Jacky Durand (FRA)	Lotto–Adecco	s.t.
10	José Luis Arrieta (ESP)	Banesto	s.t.

General classification after stage 6

Rank	Rider	Team	Time
1	Alberto Elli (ITA)	Team Telekom	18h 58' 40"
2	Fabrice Gougot (FRA)	Crédit Agricole	+ 12"
3	Marc Wauters (BEL)	Rabobank	+ 1' 17"
4	Pascal Chanteur (FRA)	AG2R Prévoyance	+ 2' 56"
5	José Luis Arrieta (ESP)	Banesto	+ 3' 08"
6	Jacky Durand (FRA)	Lotto–Adecco	+ 3' 27"
7	Salvatore Commesso (ITA)	Saeco–Valli & Valli	+ 3' 52"
8	Servais Knaven (NED)	Farm Frites	+ 4' 31"
9	Arvis Piziks (LAT)	Memory Card–Jack & Jones	+ 4' 38"
10	Laurent Jalabert (FRA)	ONCE–Deutsche Bank	+ 5' 40"

== Stage 7 ==
7 July 2000 — Tours to Limoges, 205 km (127 mi)

Stage 7 result

Rank	Rider	Team	Time
1	Christophe Agnolutto (FRA)	AG2R Prévoyance	5h 11' 41"
2	Marcel Wüst (GER)	Festina	+ 1' 11"
3	Erik Zabel (GER)	Team Telekom	s.t.
4	Romāns Vainšteins (LAT)	Vini Caldirola–Sidermec	s.t.
5	Zoran Klemenčič (SLO)	Vini Caldirola–Sidermec	s.t.
6	Paolo Bettini (ITA)	Mapei–Quick-Step	s.t.
7	Jans Koerts (NED)	Farm Frites	s.t.
8	Stefano Zanini (ITA)	Mapei–Quick-Step	s.t.
9	Enrico Cassani (ITA)	Team Polti	s.t.
10	Glenn Magnusson (SWE)	Farm Frites	s.t.

General classification after stage 7

Rank	Rider	Team	Time
1	Alberto Elli (ITA)	Team Telekom	24h 11' 32"
2	Fabrice Gougot (FRA)	Crédit Agricole	+ 12"
3	Marc Wauters (BEL)	Rabobank	+ 1' 17"
4	Pascal Chanteur (FRA)	AG2R Prévoyance	+ 2' 56"
5	José Luis Arrieta (ESP)	Banesto	+ 3' 08"
6	Jacky Durand (FRA)	Lotto–Adecco	+ 3' 21"
7	Salvatore Commesso (ITA)	Saeco–Valli & Valli	+ 3' 52"
8	Servais Knaven (NED)	Farm Frites	+ 4' 31"
9	Arvis Piziks (LAT)	Memory Card–Jack & Jones	+ 4' 38"
10	Laurent Jalabert (FRA)	ONCE–Deutsche Bank	+ 5' 40"

== Stage 8 ==
8 July 2000 — Limoges to Villeneuve-sur-Lot, 203.5 km (126.4 mi)

Stage 8 result

Rank	Rider	Team	Time
1	Erik Dekker (NED)	Rabobank	4h 22' 14"
2	Xavier Jan (FRA)	Française des Jeux	+ 52"
3	José Vicente García (ESP)	Banesto	+ 56"
4	Fred Rodriguez (USA)	Mapei–Quick-Step	+ 58"
5	Dario Pieri (ITA)	Saeco–Valli & Valli	s.t.
6	Bart Voskamp (NED)	Team Polti	s.t.
7	Didier Rous (FRA)	Bonjour	s.t.
8	Mauro Radaelli (ITA)	Vini Caldirola–Sidermec	+ 1' 36"
9	Nicolaj Bo Larsen (DEN)	Memory Card–Jack & Jones	s.t.
10	Michael Sandstød (DEN)	Memory Card–Jack & Jones	+ 1' 43"

General classification after stage 8

Rank	Rider	Team	Time
1	Alberto Elli (ITA)	Team Telekom	28h 39' 28"
2	Fabrice Gougot (FRA)	Crédit Agricole	+ 12"
3	Marc Wauters (BEL)	Rabobank	+ 1' 17"
4	Pascal Chanteur (FRA)	AG2R Prévoyance	+ 2' 56"
5	José Luis Arrieta (ESP)	Banesto	+ 3' 08"
6	Jens Voigt (GER)	Crédit Agricole	+ 3' 17"
7	Jacky Durand (FRA)	Lotto–Adecco	+ 3' 21"
8	Salvatore Commesso (ITA)	Saeco–Valli & Valli	+ 3' 52"
9	Servais Knaven (NED)	Farm Frites	+ 4' 31"
10	Arvis Piziks (LAT)	Memory Card–Jack & Jones	+ 4' 38"

== Stage 9 ==
9 July 2000 — Agen to Dax, 181 km (112 mi)

Stage 9 result

Rank	Rider	Team	Time
1	Paolo Bettini (ITA)	Mapei–Quick-Step	4h 29' 06"
2	Geert Verheyen (BEL)	Lotto–Adecco	s.t.
3	José Ángel Vidal (ESP)	Kelme–Costa Blanca	s.t.
4	Didier Rous (FRA)	Bonjour	s.t.
5	Erik Zabel (GER)	Team Telekom	s.t.
6	Romāns Vainšteins (LAT)	Vini Caldirola–Sidermec	s.t.
7	Enrico Cassani (ITA)	Team Polti	s.t.
8	Arvis Piziks (LAT)	Memory Card–Jack & Jones	s.t.
9	Stefano Zanini (ITA)	Mapei–Quick-Step	s.t.
10	Zoran Klemenčič (SLO)	Vini Caldirola–Sidermec	s.t.

General classification after stage 9

Rank	Rider	Team	Time
1	Alberto Elli (ITA)	Team Telekom	33h 08' 34"
2	Fabrice Gougot (FRA)	Crédit Agricole	+ 12"
3	Marc Wauters (BEL)	Rabobank	+ 1' 15"
4	Pascal Chanteur (FRA)	AG2R Prévoyance	+ 2' 56"
5	José Luis Arrieta (ESP)	Banesto	+ 3' 08"
6	Jacky Durand (FRA)	Lotto–Adecco	+ 3' 17"
7	Jens Voigt (GER)	Crédit Agricole	s.t.
8	Salvatore Commesso (ITA)	Saeco–Valli & Valli	+ 3' 52"
9	Servais Knaven (NED)	Farm Frites	+ 4' 31"
10	Arvis Piziks (LAT)	Memory Card–Jack & Jones	+ 4' 38"

== Stage 10 ==
10 July 2000 — Dax to Hautacam, 205 km (127 mi)

Stage 10 result

Rank	Rider	Team	Time
1	Javier Otxoa (ESP)	Kelme–Costa Blanca	6h 09' 32"
~~2~~	~~Lance Armstrong (USA)~~	~~U.S. Postal Service~~	~~+ 42"~~
3	José María Jiménez (ESP)	Banesto	+ 1' 13"
4	Richard Virenque (FRA)	Team Polti	+ 1' 57"
5	Manuel Beltrán (ESP)	Mapei–Quick-Step	s.t.
6	Fernando Escartín (ESP)	Kelme–Costa Blanca	+ 2' 02"
7	Roberto Heras (ESP)	Kelme–Costa Blanca	s.t.
8	Christophe Moreau (FRA)	Festina	+ 3' 05"
9	Joseba Beloki (ESP)	Festina	+ 3' 35"
10	Alex Zülle (SUI)	Banesto	+ 3' 47"

General classification after stage 10

Rank	Rider	Team	Time
~~1~~	~~Lance Armstrong (USA)~~	~~U.S. Postal Service~~	~~39h 24' 30"~~
2	Jan Ullrich (GER)	Team Telekom	+ 4' 14"
3	Christophe Moreau (FRA)	Festina	+ 5' 10"
4	Marc Wauters (BEL)	Rabobank	+ 5' 18"
5	Peter Luttenberger (AUT)	ONCE–Deutsche Bank	+ 5' 21"
6	Joseba Beloki (ESP)	Festina	+ 5' 23"
7	Manuel Beltrán (ESP)	Mapei–Quick-Step	+ 5' 44"
8	Javier Otxoa (ESP)	Kelme–Costa Blanca	+ 6' 13"
9	José María Jiménez (ESP)	Banesto	+ 6' 21"
10	Ángel Casero (ESP)	Festina	+ 6' 55"

== Stage 11 ==
11 July 2000 — Bagnères-de-Bigorre to Revel, 218.5 km (135.8 mi)

Stage 11 result

Rank	Rider	Team	Time
1	Erik Dekker (NED)	Rabobank	5h 05' 47"
2	Santiago Botero (COL)	Kelme–Costa Blanca	s.t.
3	Rik Verbrugghe (BEL)	Lotto–Adecco	+ 4' 51"
4	David Millar (GBR)	Cofidis	s.t.
5	Francisco Mancebo (ESP)	Banesto	s.t.
6	Alexander Vinokourov (KAZ)	Team Telekom	s.t.
7	David Etxebarria (ESP)	ONCE–Deutsche Bank	s.t.
8	Mario Aerts (BEL)	Lotto–Adecco	s.t.
9	Michele Bartoli (ITA)	Mapei–Quick-Step	s.t.
10	Erik Zabel (GER)	Team Telekom	+ 5' 05"

General classification after stage 11

Rank	Rider	Team	Time
~~1~~	~~Lance Armstrong (USA)~~	~~U.S. Postal Service~~	~~44h 35' 22"~~
2	Jan Ullrich (GER)	Team Telekom	+ 4' 14"
3	Christophe Moreau (FRA)	Festina	+ 5' 10"
4	Marc Wauters (BEL)	Rabobank	+ 5' 18"
5	Peter Luttenberger (AUT)	ONCE–Deutsche Bank	+ 5' 21"
6	Joseba Beloki (ESP)	Festina	+ 5' 23"
7	Manuel Beltrán (ESP)	Mapei–Quick-Step	+ 5' 44"
8	Javier Otxoa (ESP)	Kelme–Costa Blanca	+ 6' 13"
9	José María Jiménez (ESP)	Banesto	+ 6' 21"
10	Ángel Casero (ESP)	Festina	+ 6' 55"
