= Geronimo (disambiguation) =

Geronimo (1829–1909) was a Chiricahua Apache leader.

Geronimo may also refer to:

== Places in the United States ==
- Geronimo, Arizona
- Geronimo, Oklahoma, a town
- Geronimo, Texas, an unincorporated community and census-designated place
- Geronimo Creek, Texas

== People ==
- Geronimo (name), a list of people with the given name or surname
- Saint Francis de Geronimo (1642–1716), Jesuit priest and missionary who was canonized by Gregory XVI in 1839
- Don Geronimo (born 1958), stage name of radio personality Michael Sorce
- Mic Geronimo, stage name of American hip-hop rapper Michael McDermon (born 1973)
- Géronimo, a stage name of French singer-songwriter Éric Greff (born 1975), better known as Helmut Fritz

== Arts and entertainment ==
=== Fictional characters ===
- Geronimo (Kinnikuman), in the Kinnikuman manga series
- Geronimo, the figurehead of the resistance in Colony
- Fatz Geronimo, in The Rock-afire Explosion, an animatronic robot band that played in Showbiz Pizza Place
- Geronimo Stilton, in the children's book series with the same title

=== Films ===
- Geronimo (1939 film), starring Chief Thundercloud
- Geronimo (1962 film), starring Chuck Connors
- Geronimo (1993 film), starring Joseph Runningfox
- Geronimo (2014 film), a French film
- Geronimo: An American Legend, a 1993 film starring Wes Studi, Matt Damon, Robert Duvall, and Gene Hackman

=== Music ===
- "Geronimo" (The Shadows song), a 1963 song by the Shadows
- "Geronimo" (Aura Dione song), a 2011 song by Danish singer-songwriter Aura Dione
- "Geronimo" (Sheppard song), a 2014 song by Australian band Sheppard
- "Geronimo", a 1953 song by Les Elgart And His Orchestra
- "Geronimo", a 1971 reggae single by Bruce Ruffin
- "Geronimo", a 2023 song by Don Toliver from Love Sick
- "Geronimo", a 1956 song by the Four Voices
- "Geronimo", a 1970 song by Symarip as the Pyramids

== Ships ==
- Geronimo (yacht), a French trimaran
- USS Geronimo, two US Navy tugs
- SS Geronimo, a World War II Liberty ship

== Other uses ==
- Geronimo (alpaca), the subject of a failed campaign to prevent his euthanisation
- Geronimo (beaver), beaver used in the 1948 Idaho Department of Fish and Game beaver relocation program
- Geronimo (exclamation), traditionally used by a parachutist upon jumping from an airplane
- Operation Geronimo (disambiguation), several military operations
- Forward Operating Base Geronimo, a US Marine Corps base in Afghanistan
- "Geronimo", the codename for Osama bin Laden during Operation Neptune's Spear
- Apache Geronimo, an open source application server developed by the Apache Software Foundation
- Geronimo FM, a radio station in Indonesia
- Geronimo Motor Company, an American vehicle manufacturer which produced the Geronimo automobile from 1917 to 1920

== See also ==
- San Geronimo (disambiguation)
- San Jerónimo (disambiguation)
- Gironimo!, a book by Tim Moore
