= French Revolutions =

2001 humorous book by Tim Moore

Front cover of the first British edition, with an illustration by Steven Appleby

French Revolutions: Cycling the Tour de France, Tim Moore's third book, is an account of his attempt to ride the route of the 2000 Tour de France shortly before the actual race: as summarized by William Fotheringham, "A cycling novice takes on a bonkers task".

== Ride ==
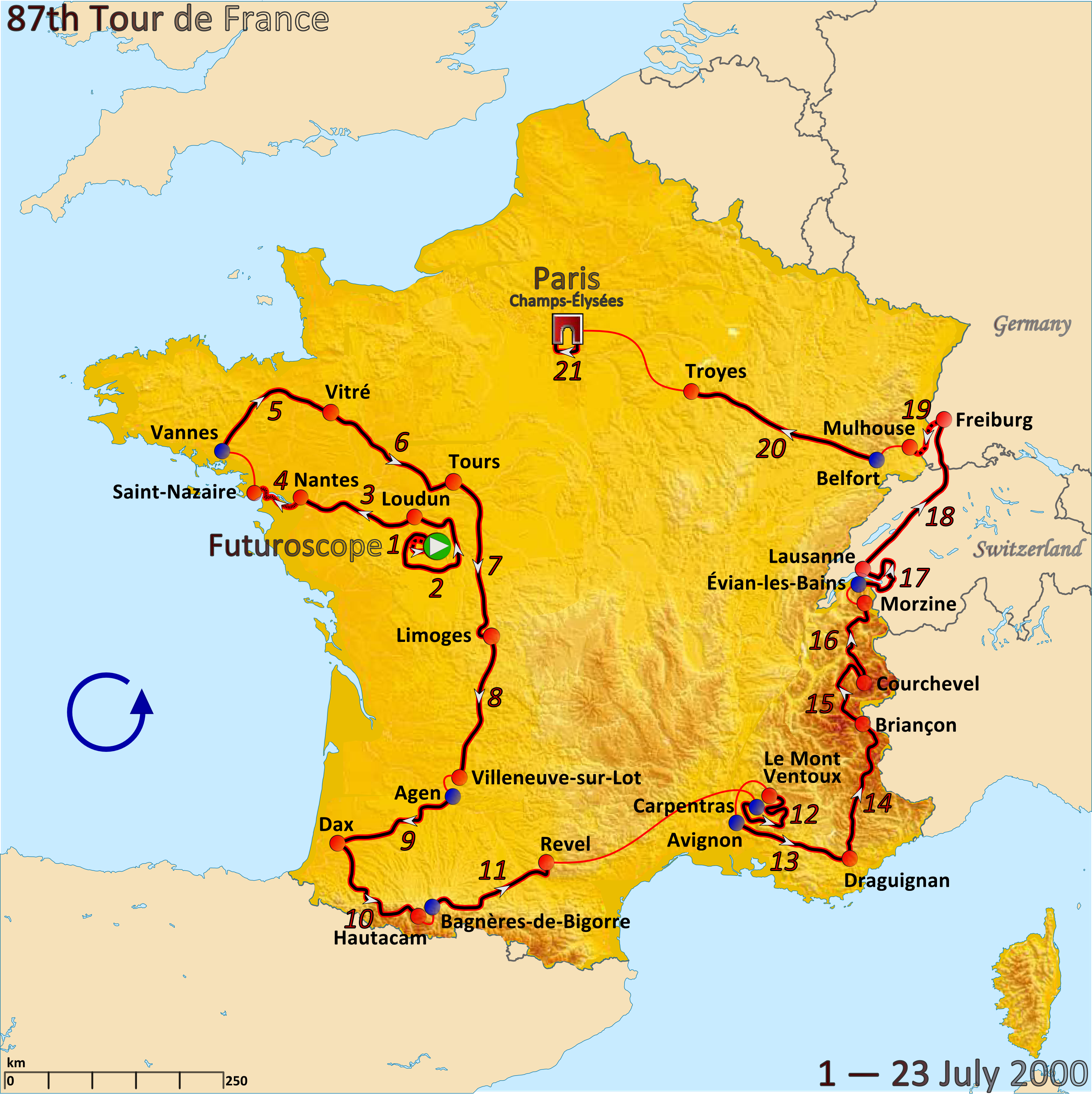
Route of the 2000 Tour de France

Moore did not at first plan to ride the entire route, instead intending to ride only "representative bits". However, realizing that the Tour was a test of endurance, he determined to ride the whole route – even if he took twice the time available to the pros.

The hazards he had to deal with included "bad pizza, brain-frying monotony, roadkill, unnerving encounters with locals and 'bonking'".

The secretiveness of the Tour press office – "without whom none of this would have been difficult" – and the unhelpfulness of local tourist offices made fidelity to the precise route of the Tour difficult. But Moore also knowingly simplified several stretches: his hopes of taking a train from Loudun to Tours and thereby saving 634 km thwarted by the train timetable, he nevertheless avoided an "irritating little loop" by riding directly to Saint-Flovier; he skipped the climb from Lourdes to Hautacam; driving from Carpentras to Sault shortened the approach to Mont Ventoux by 89 km; and he avoided the climb from Brides-les-Bains to Courchevel (though doing two other Alpine climbs that day).

Taken as a whole, however, the ride was a remarkable feat. Moore rode 3,000 km (the route of the Tour turned out to be 3,662 km) and:

Of the seven HC climbs, I'd pushed up half of the first, bunked off the second and been chauffeured along the last stretch of the third in a drugged-up coma. But the remaining four had all been conquered in a fashion that by my standards at least was very possibly heroic.

Moore rode a GT ZR3000: although the previous year's model, it was bought new for the purpose. Moore's subsequent bicycle journeys, recounted in his later books, would be on very different machines.

== Reception ==
According to the review for The New York Times Book Review:

[Moore] plays his foolhardy crusade purely for laughs, tempering the slapstick with bits of cycling lore and reflections on the event's crippling physical demands, the near-biblical tribulations of past champions and the Tour's checkered history of greed, cynicism and cheating.

The reviewer for the The Irish Times wrote that "what emerges with stunning vividness from Moore's pages is the sheer awfulness of much of rural France"; and when contrasted with all the preparations for the Tour by provincial towns and villages along its route, "race day itself seemed wilfully harrowing" as a "grotesque cavalcade of promotional vehicles" precedes the riders, who "hurtle through in seconds.... It's like spending a year getting dressed up for a big date and then being showered with tacky gifts, rudely groped and roughly dumped all in the space of an afternoon."

Reviewing the book for New Statesman, Henry Sheen notes that its author shares with some of the professionals "a weakness for performance-enhancing drugs". A combination of caffeine and ephedrine fails to propel him up Mont Ventoux: close to the point where Tom Simpson (dedicatee of the book (Note: Moore on Simpson: Moore, Tim (11 August 2002). "Cognac, pills and 10 lbs of carrots". The Observer. London – via The Guardian.)) collapsed and died, Moore collapses too. "This is not a cyclist's book, but the suffering is authentic".

For Chris Maume, reviewing the book for The Independent, "Moore appears not to like the French that much – or, indeed, the Italians, Swiss or Germans (Note: The day before Moore climbed to the Col d'Izoard, stage 19 of the Giro d'Italia had done the same. The route was amply littered, by, Moore assumed, Italian fans. Moore's route took him from Évian-les-Bains to Mulhouse (France) via Murten/Morat and Basel (Switzerland) and Freiburg (Germany).) – and most of his exchanges with the locals are fuelled by mutual hostility." But despite the hostility and grumpiness, "there are fine passages of pithy description", and by the end of the book Moore "has discovered his backbone".

After reading the book for the third time, Shriram Krishnamurthi wrote of how his reactions to it had changed over time. At his least attractive, Moore mistreated his host nation and complained tiresomely. "[G]reat literature this certainly isn't", yet it was more palatable on the third reading. "His passion for the Tour comes through despite his bile ... [this is] an account of a person doing what you wished you could, sharing his inner fears while daring you to follow in his trail."

One scholar gives French Revolutions and Moore's Gironimo! as examples of the "literary cycling pilgrimage", a genre that dates back to Elizabeth Robins Pennell and Joseph Pennell's A Canterbury Pilgrimage of 1885, and that, after a decline, "revived during another flourishing of cycle-travel literature in the 1980s and 90s, though often with a broader interpretation of pilgrimage".

Simon O'Hagan put French Revolutions among ten or so "worthwhile cycling books"; Rob Penn put it among the ten best; William Fotheringham selected it as one of five particularly worthwhile books about travel by bicycle. (Note: The others were John Foster Fraser, Round the World on a Wheel (1899); Dervla Murphy, Full Tilt: Ireland to India with a Bicycle (1965); Ian Hibell, Into the Remote Places (1984); and Eric Newby, Round Ireland in Low Gear (1987).)

== Editions ==
French Revolutions: Cycling the Tour de France:

- London: Yellow Jersey, 2001. ISBN 0-224-06095-3
- London: Vintage, 2002. ISBN 0-09-943382-6
- New York: St. Martin's, 2002. ISBN 0-312-29045-4
- New York: St. Martin's Griffin, 2003. ISBN 0312316127
- London: Yellow Jersey, 2014. ISBN 9780224092388

The earlier British editions are illustrated by Steven Appleby.

Translations into German (Alpenpässe & Anchovis: eine exzentrische Tour de France), Dutch (De Tour de France met de Britse slag, or Franse omwentelingen: een ongetrainde Engelsman fietst de Tour de France), and Italian (Adagio su due ruote: un dilettante al Tour de France) have also been published.
