= Ricardo Otxoa =

Spanish cyclist (1974–2001)

- Ricardo Otxoa in 1997

Personal information
- Full name: Ricardo Otxoa Palacios
- Born: 30 August 1974 Barakaldo, Spain
- Died: 15 February 2001 (aged 26) Cártama, Spain

Cycling career
- Sport: Cycling
- Discipline: Road
- Role: Rider

Amateur teams
- 1995: ONCE (stagiaire)
- 1999: Tegui Videoporteros

Professional teams
- 1996–1998: ONCE
- 2000–2001: Kelme–Costa Blanca

Ricardo Otxoa Palacios (30 August 1974 – 15 February 2001) was a Spanish cyclist.

== Career ==
Otxoa turned professional with ONCE after riding with the team as a stagiaire the previous year. He stayed on the team for three years, and rode as an amateur in 1999. In 2000, he returned to the professionals, and joined Kelme–Costa Blanca with his twin brother, Javier.

He rode in the 2000 Giro d'Italia, finishing 42nd overall.

== Death ==
On 15 February 2001, Otxoa and his twin brother Javier were hit by a driver of a car during a training ride near Málaga. Ricardo was killed, while his brother survived, facing severe injuries and a coma.

The Circuito de Getxo has also been held as the Memorial Ricardo Otxoa in memory of Otxoa.

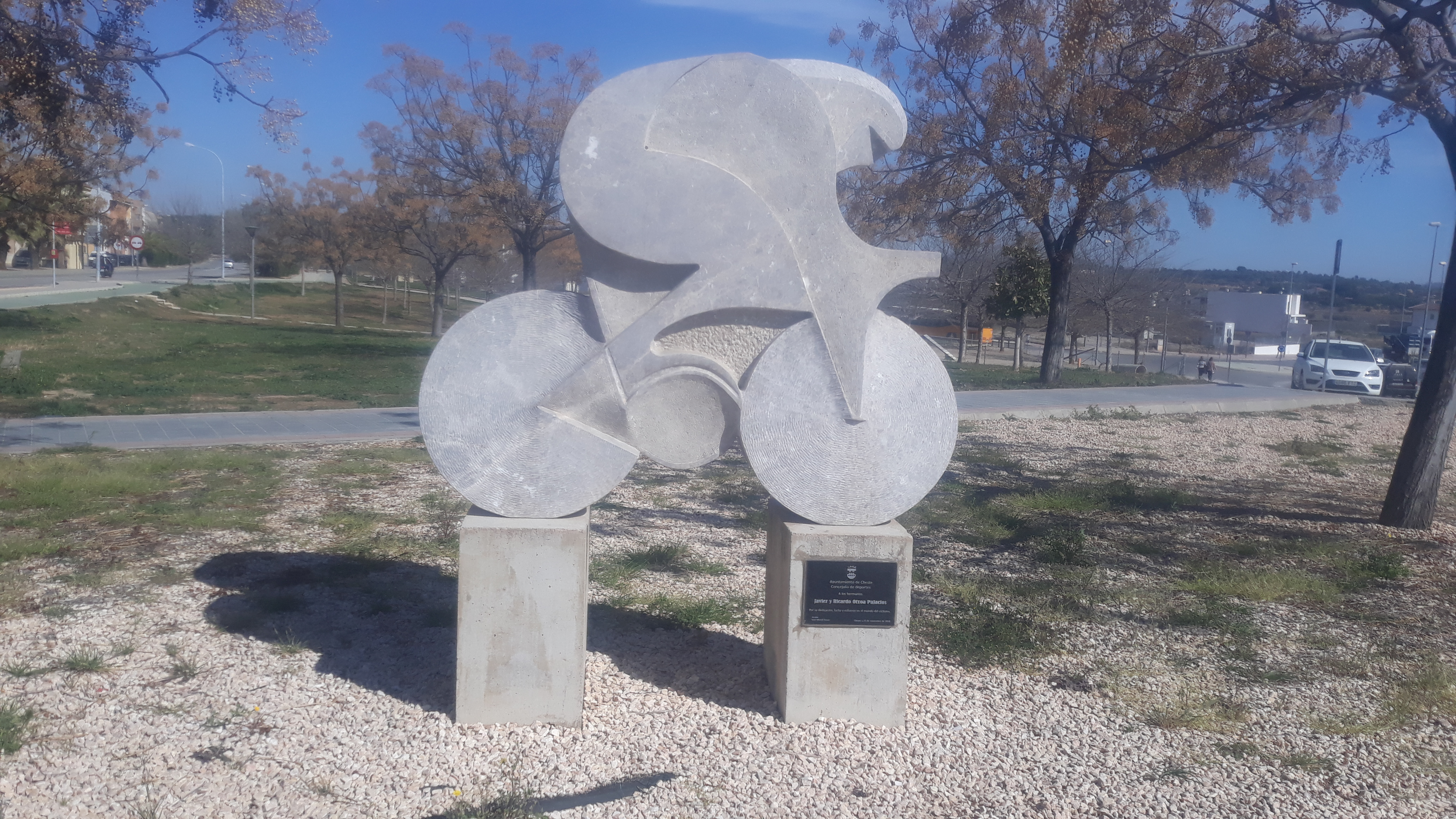
Monument dedicated to Javier and Ricardo Otxoa Palacios in Cheste, Spain

== Major results ==
1999
3rd Overall Volta a Lleida
2000
3rd GP Llodio

== See also ==
- List of racing cyclists and pacemakers with a cycling-related death
