= Operation Geronimo =

Operation Geronimo may refer to:

- Operation Neptune Spear, the May 2011 operation that resulted in the death of Osama bin Laden in Abbottabad, Pakistan
  - Operation Geronimo name controversy, concerning the use of "Geronimo" in the hunt for Osama bin Laden
- Operation Geronimo Strike
  - Operation Geronimo Strike I, the 2007 counterinsurgency operation in Kalsu's Fish Farms, Iraq
  - Operation Geronimo Strike II, the 2007 counterinsurgency operation in Iraq
  - Operation Geronimo Strike III, the 2007 strike against Al-Qaeda in Iraq, northwest of Iskandariyah, Iraq
- Task Force 1 Geronimo, the 2009–2010 operation of 501st Infantry Regiment (United States) in Afghanistan, during Operation Enduring Freedom
- Operation Geronimo (Vietnam War), a 101st Airborne Division search operation
- The military expedition to capture or kill Chief Geronimo, during the Indian Wars, see Geronimo

== See also ==
- Geronimo (disambiguation)
