= Gironimo! =

Humorous cycling book by Tim Moore

Front cover of the first British edition, with an illustration by Steven Appleby

Gironimo! Riding the Very Terrible 1914 Tour of Italy (2014) is Tim Moore's account of his own ride in 2012 along the route taken by the infamously demanding Giro d'Italia of 1914. Moore rode a bicycle of the period, with gearing, braking, lighting and other facilities outdated by a century. Gironimo!, his tenth book, was favourably reviewed.

== Background ==
Moore's book French Revolutions had been a commercial success, so its publisher was keen for him to write something similar – but the difficulty described had to be increased; thus he would relive not just any Giro d'Italia but instead the most notorious, and do so not on a bicycle generally thought suitable for such an journey but instead on a bicycle of the period.

Recounting how he came to buy a pile of old parts claimed by its seller to constitute a century-old bicycle, Moore writes:

The journey that led me to this Breton garage had started sixty mornings earlier, when I opened the inside back page of my paper and read that US federal prosecutors were dropping a two-year investigation into allegations of systematic doping by Lance Armstrong and his former team, US Postal.

Although his own earlier ride (described in French Revolutions) along the route of the 2000 Tour de France had been gruelling, as each "Grand Tour" had been for its participants in decades past, Armstrong had made the task look easy, in part by cheating: "[his] untempered hatred of 'cheats' like [Armstrong] he voices volubly". Moore planned to respond with a real endurance trial: he "[attempted] to stick it to Mr. Armstrong, and to the riders of Mr. Armstrong's drug generation, who had made a mockery of a sport built by unbreakable men". He "felt that the way to rediscover [his] love for cycling was to return to a simpler, nobler, harder age of cycling".

== Ride ==
"Pushing hard into Umbria. Must emphasise that my vast rearward bulge is a rear pocket full of travel essentials rather than weird flesh."

The 1914 Giro d'Italia had only eight stages; but it was brutal: totalling 3,170 km, the average stage was 396 km; and the longest (the third, from Lucca to Rome) was 430 km. (Note: By contrast, the 2014 Giro had 21, the longest of which was 247 km.) This along unmetalled and sometimes muddy roads, with poor lighting, and sabotaging by competitors and their fans. Of the 81 riders who started the race, only eight completed it. "[S]everal [cycle historians] make a reasonable case ... that it was the hardest Grand Tour of all time." (Note: In terms of sheer distance, it was less extreme than the 482 km of a stage in every Tour de France from that of 1919 to that of 1926.)

Moore bought a copy of Paolo Facchinetti's book Giro 1914, il più duro di tutti, (Note: Giro 1914, il più duro di tutti: Quei temerari delle macchine a pedali [Giro 1914, the hardest of all: Those daredevils of pedal machines] (Turin: Bradipolibri, 2009; ISBN 9788896184042).) "a slim account of the event, embellished with some evocative photographs". As it was written in a language Moore had only briefly studied three decades earlier, the book "presented certain difficulties". Based on Facchinetti's meeting in 1972 with Alfonso Calzolari (the winner of the 1914 Giro), then in his eighties, it provides his abridgement of Calzolari's race diary of a route that went from Milan via Turin, Genoa, Florence, Narni, Rome, Potenza, Bari, L'Aquila, Jesi and Verona, and back to Milan. Attempting to use this in order to plot his own route, Moore found that many of the roads the 1914 Giro had taken "had subsequently fallen into deep obscurity"; he freely used alternatives close to them.

La Française Diamant head badge

The pile of old bicycle parts Moore had bought in Brittany included the head badge for a Société la Française "Diamant", but Moore belatedly realized that the frame he had bought was not a Diamant but a "Brillant": an unrelated and pedestrian marque. (Note: For more about the Brillant, see "1903 Machine 'Brillant' No 1 (Dursley-Pedersen 3-Speed Gear)" (Online Bicycle Museum).) Looking for a sportier machine while at the Anjou Vélo Vintage festival (in Saumur), he eventually found a bicycle that "was self-evidently ancient: filthy, liberally pocked with rust and unburdened with brakes ... [but] a racer, and of appropriate vintage": a Hirondelle Nº 7 "Demi-Course".

Advertisement for the Hirondelle Nº 7 "Demi-Course" bicycle, published in 1913 for the mail-order company Manufacture française d'armes et cycles de Saint-Étienne (Loire). As standard, the bicycle has wood rims, no brake, and only a single rear sprocket (and thus only a single gear). Listed as options are a brake for the front tyre, one for the rear rim, and versions with either two or three gears.

Although the bicycles used in the race (like Moore's own Hirondelle) had a choice of only two, similar gears (changed by turning the rear wheel around to use the sprocket on the other side), most of the stages of the race included considerable climbing: as one example, a 40 km climb from Susa (at 500m) to Sestriere (2,035m), which "took its place amongst the most dreadfully protracted ordeals of my life".

For Moore, riding a bicycle with wooden rims and "prosecco stoppers" for brake pads largely alternated between "sloth (riding up hills) and terror (riding down them)".

The quest for authenticity extended to clothing:

Jerseys of this period were long-sleeved, roll-over cowl-necks fashioned from heavy wool, like something you might have worn to catch deep-sea fish in the Whisky Galore! era. What fun that promised to be when I was toiling round Italy in the dog days of late August.

Period attire arrived by post:

In a state of excited dread I tore open a Jiffy bag plastered in transatlantic stamps to reveal the "vintage chemist goggles with leather side shields" I'd bought off a Canadian eBayer. My word, they were mad: John Lennon specs for a steampunk welder. I put them on and felt all kinds of wrong.

There were limits: Moore also packed "[a]n inauthentic micro-fleece top" and Gore-Tex rain jacket – and, clothing aside, a Garmin 800 Edge cycle computer.

Moore's ride, an anticlockwise loop starting and ending at Milan (marked). (Note: A marker indicates a place – usually but not always a city, town or village, but occasionally a pass or hotel – that Moore mentions as being along his route.) Other markers: correspond to the 1st stage of the Giro (Milan to Cuneo); 2nd (Cuneo–Lucca); 3rd (Lucca–Rome); 4th (Rome–Avellino); 5th (Avellino–Bari); 6th (Bari–L'Aquila); 7th (L'Aquila–Lugo); 8th (Lugo–Milan).

In 32 days of riding, Moore's cycle computer calculated totals of 3,336 km distance and 32,328m elevation gain, and an average speed of 17.8 km/h.

== Reception ==
The book was warmly reviewed. Juliet Macur wrote that it was a mixture of "a narrative about one of cycling's toughest races ever ... with an entertaining and jauntily written travelogue"; the review in the Minneapolis Star Tribune called it "a hilarious, harebrained adventure".

Macur observed that "Despite the upsides of his trip, ... the feeling a reader will probably take away from Mr. Moore's Giro is one of pain, and unnecessary pain at that." To this view, Matt McKinney countered:

[T]his is not merely about suffering, but about reclaiming the lost pure heart of road racing, the one before energy gels, titanium and coldly efficient pacing of the modern-day peloton. On a mission that could easily veer into preachiness, Moore is too humorous a narrator to let the story go off track.

The review for the Cape Argus concluded "It's another wonderfully entertaining armchair read from Moore"; that for the Bristol Post, "a wonderfully written, extremely funny book which mixes sporting prowess (or lack of it) and evocative, I-want-to-go-there travelogue".

However, in an otherwise appreciative review for Booklist, Craig Clark noted that "Readers may tire of the repeated references to the state of [the author's] 'intimate parts'". Yet the same magazine placed it among the "top 10 sports books" reviewed in the year ending August 2015.

One scholar gives Gironimo! and Moore's French Revolutions as examples of the "literary cycling pilgrimage", a genre that dates back to Elizabeth Robins Pennell and Joseph Pennell's A Canterbury Pilgrimage of 1885, and that, after a decline, "revived during another flourishing of cycle-travel literature in the 1980s and 90s, though often with a broader interpretation of pilgrimage".

== Aftermath ==
Gironimo! was Book of the Week on BBC Radio 4 in May 2014.

As for having done it on an old bicycle: "By finding some rusty 100-year-old crock and getting it back on the road, I like to think I pretty much single-handedly brought down the Age of Consumerism." After the book was published, Moore would still sometimes ride his Hirondelle.

Asked for his top cycling tip around the time Gironimo! was published, Moore suggested riding in the Netherlands: "Pan-flat and full of cravenly subservient motorists, the Netherlands is no place for the cyclo-tourist who likes to suffer. For the right-minded rest of us, it's a nirvana...."

== Editions ==
Gironimo! Riding the Very Terrible 1914 Tour of Italy:

- London: Yellow Jersey, 2014. ISBN 978-0-224-09207-4
- London: Yellow Jersey, 2015. ISBN 978-0-224-10015-1
- New York: Pegasus, 2015. ISBN 9781605987781
- New York: Pegasus, 2019. ISBN 9781681771281

The title was the publisher's choice: Moore had wanted to title the book The Very Terrible Bicycle Race, or similar.

The British editions have illustrations by Steven Appleby, and photographs. A German translation – Gironimo! Ein Mann, ein Rad und die härteste Italien-Rundfahrt aller Zeiten – has also been published.
