= Olivier Perraudeau =

French cyclist

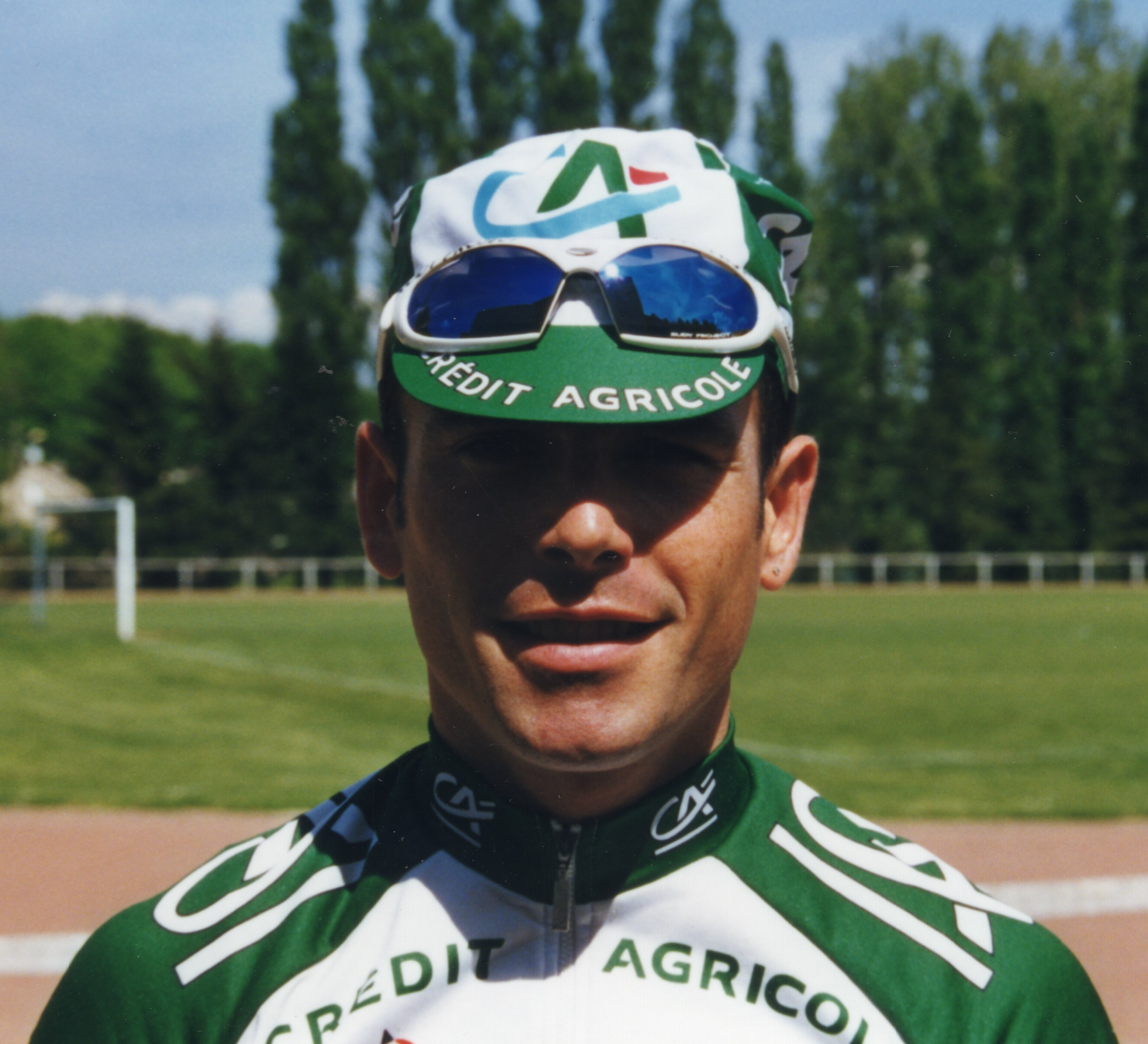
- Perraudeau in 1999

Personal information
- Full name: Olivier Perraudeau
- Born: 9 November 1972 (age 53) Challans, France

Cycling career
- Sport: Cycling
- Role: Rider

Olivier Perraudeau (born 9 November 1972) is a former French racing cyclist. He was active in cycling from 1995-2003. He finished in last place in the 2000 Tour de France.
