= Hautacam =

Ski resort in the French Pyrenees

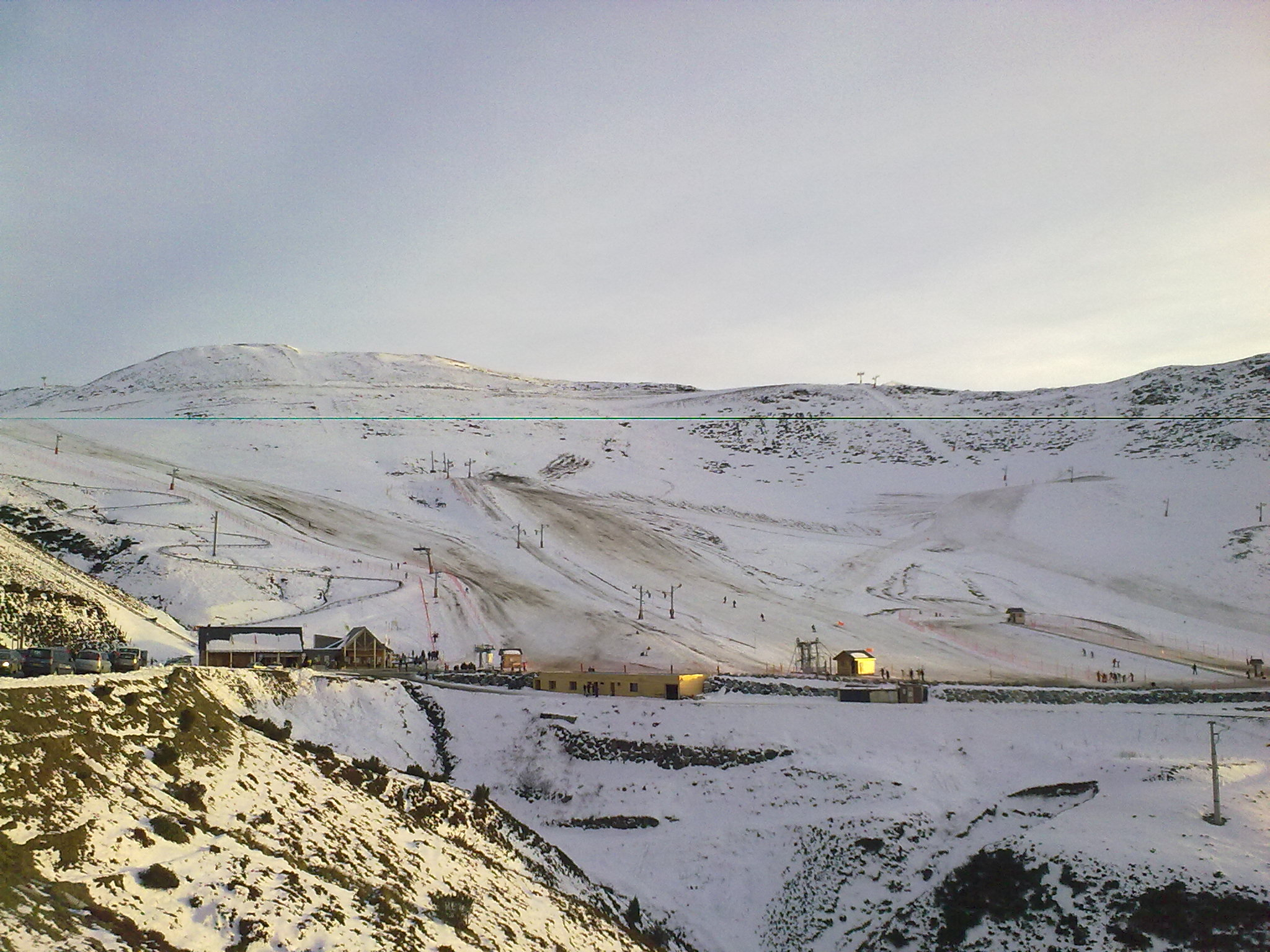
- The station in December 2010

- Location within France Location within Occitanie Location within Pyrenees
- Nearest city: Argelès-Gazost
- Coordinates: 42°58′20″N 0°00′29″W
- Top elevation: 1,800 m (5,900 ft)
- Base elevation: 1,500 m (4,900 ft)
- Website: www.hautacam.com

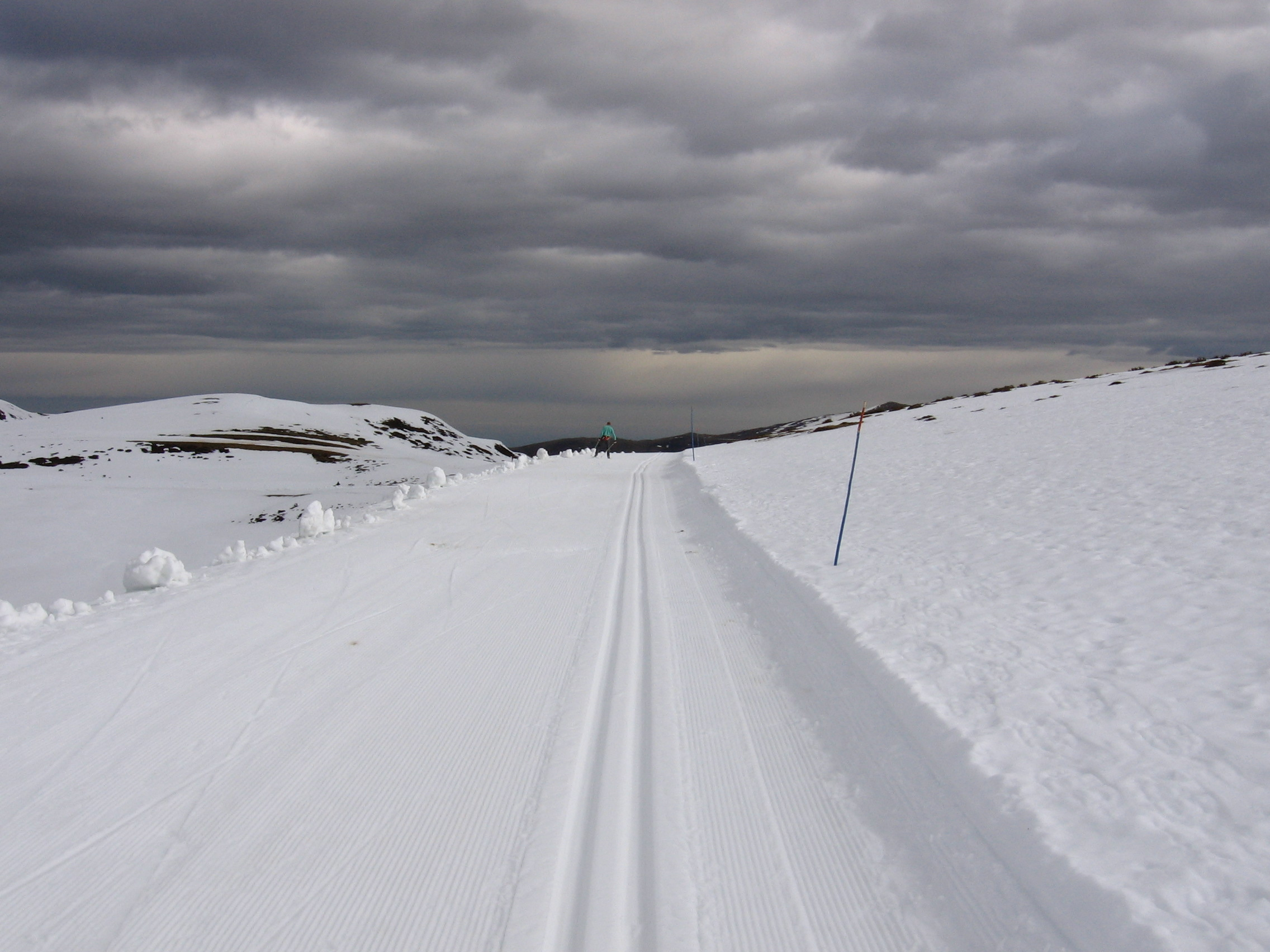
Cross-country skiing trail at Hautacam.

Hautacam is a ski resort in the French Pyrenees. It is situated in the Hautes-Pyrénées department, in the Occitania region. In road bicycle racing, the ascent to Hautacam is known as a difficult climb, which is used occasionally in the Tour de France.

== Cycle racing ==
=== Details of climb ===
Starting from Argelès-Gazost, the climb is 17.3 km (10.7 mi) long. Over this distance, the climb gains 1,170 m (3,840 ft) in altitude to the top of the climb at 1,635 m (5,364 ft), at an average gradient of 6.8%.

The stage finishes of the Tour de France in 2008 and 2014 were at an altitude of 1,520 m (4,990 ft) and in previous races were at 1,560 m (5,120 ft). The climb used by the Tour de France starts at Ayros-Arbouix, from where there is 13.6 km (8.5 mi) to the finish, climbing 1,164 m (3,819 ft), at an average gradient of 7.8%.

=== Tour de France ===
Hautacam first held a Tour de France stage in 1994, won by Luc Leblanc. Since then, it has been used a further five times, including in the final mountain stage of the 2014 race.

During the 1996 Tour de France, the reign of five-time champion Miguel Indurain effectively came to an end when Bjarne Riis launched an attack on Hautacam, claiming the stage victory and putting himself in position to win the Tour, which he eventually did.

It was on the climb to Hautacam that Lance Armstrong set up his victory in the 2000 Tour de France, until being disqualified for doping. In appalling weather, the race arrived at the first mountain stage, with Javier Otxoa the only survivor from an early break. On the final climb, Armstrong went off alone into the wind and rain, leaving his challengers struggling, pushing Jan Ullrich into second place by four minutes. Once Armstrong had taken the Maillot Jaune, he was never seriously challenged until the end of the race.

=== Tour de France stage finishes ===
Year	Stage	Start of stage	Distance (km)	Category of climb	Stage winner	Yellow jersey
2025	12	Auch	181	HC	Tadej Pogačar (SLO)	Tadej Pogačar (SLO)
2022	18	Lourdes	143.5	HC	Jonas Vingegaard (DEN)	Jonas Vingegaard (DEN)
2014	18	Pau	145.5	HC	Vincenzo Nibali (ITA)	Vincenzo Nibali (ITA)
2008	10	Pau	156	HC	Juan José Cobo (ESP)	Cadel Evans (AUS)
2000	10	Dax	205	HC	Javier Otxoa (ESP)	~~Lance Armstrong (USA)~~
1996	16	Agen	199	HC	Bjarne Riis (DEN)	Bjarne Riis (DEN)
1994	11	Cahors	263.5	HC	Luc Leblanc (FRA)	Miguel Indurain (ESP)
