= 2000 Tour de France =

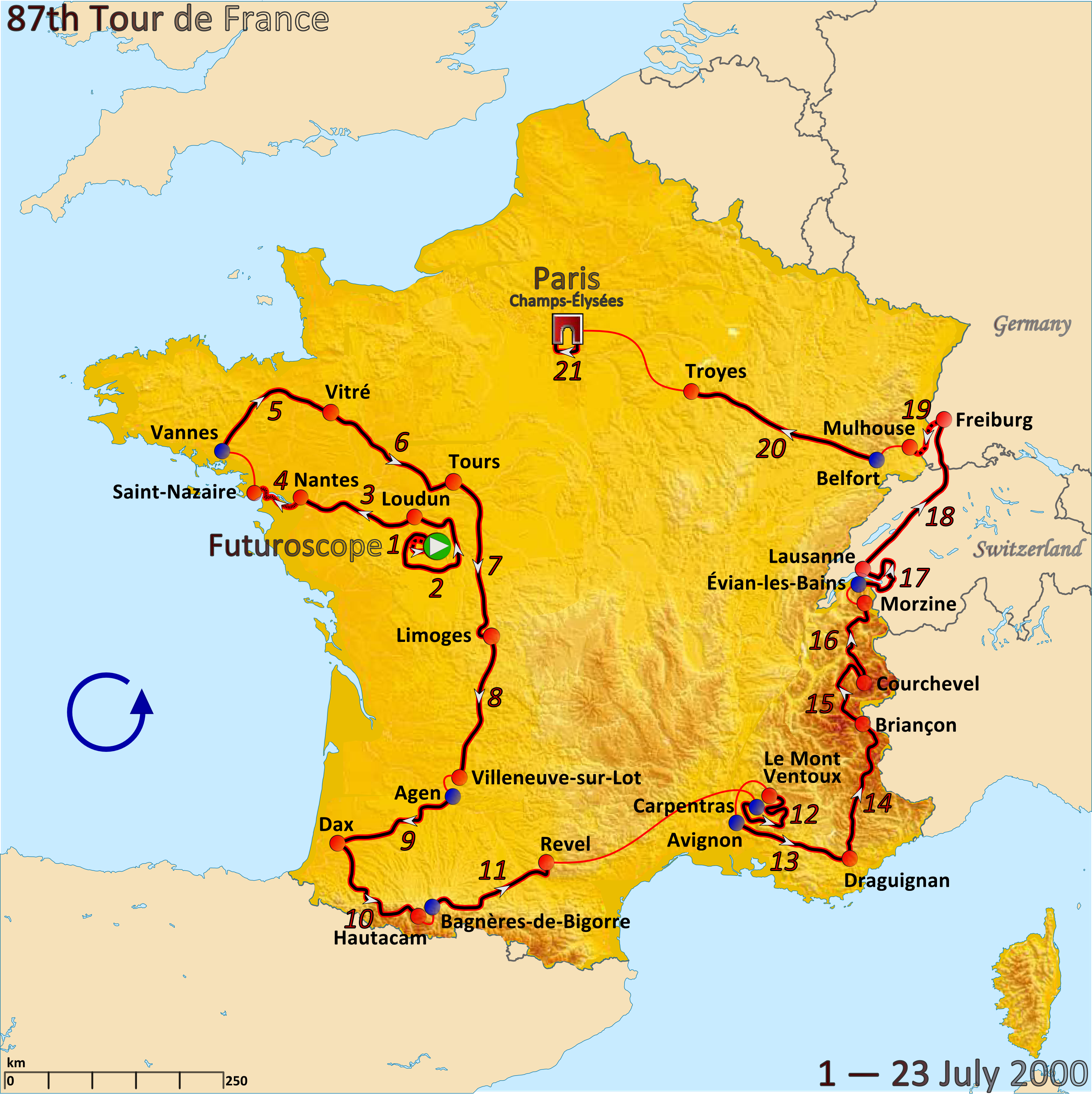
- Route of the 2000 Tour de France

Race details
- Dates: 1–23 July 2000
- Stages: 21
- Distance: 3,662 km (2,275 mi)
- Winning time: 92h 33' 08"

Results
	Winner	~~Lance Armstrong~~ none (Note: On 24 August 2012, the United States Anti-Doping Agency announced that they had disqualified Armstrong from all his results since 1998, including his victory in the 2000 Tour de France. The Union Cycliste Internationale, responsible for the international cycling, confirmed this verdict on 22 October 2012.)	
	Second	Jan Ullrich (GER)	(Team Telekom)
	Third	Joseba Beloki (ESP)	(Festina)
Jersey awarded to the points classification winner	Points	Erik Zabel (GER)	(Team Telekom)
Jersey awarded to the mountains classification winner	Mountains	Santiago Botero (COL)	(Kelme–Costa Blanca)
Jersey awarded to the young rider classification winner	Young rider	Francisco Mancebo (ESP)	(Banesto)
Jersey awarded to the combativity classification winner	Combativity	Erik Dekker (NED)	(Rabobank)
	Team	Kelme–Costa Blanca	

The 2000 Tour de France was a multiple stage bicycle race held from 1 to 23 July, and the 87th edition of the Tour de France. There was no overall winner following a vacating of results by the United States Anti-Doping Agency announcement on 24 August 2012 that they had disqualified Lance Armstrong from all his results since 1 August 1998, including his seven Tour de France wins from 1999 to 2005; the Union Cycliste Internationale confirmed the result.

The Tour started with an individual time trial in Futuroscope (not an official prologue because it was longer than 8 km) and ended, traditionally, in Paris. The distance travelled was 3663 km (counter-clockwise around France). The Tour passed through Switzerland and Germany.

Before the race started, there were several favourites: Armstrong, after his 1999 Tour de France victory; Jan Ullrich, having won the 1997 Tour de France, finishing second in the 1996 and 1998 tours, and not entering the 1999 Tour due to an injury; and 1998 Tour winner Marco Pantani. Richard Virenque finished 8th place in the 1999 Tour despite bad preparation, and for the 2000 edition he was considered an important rider. Fernando Escartín, Bobby Julich, Alexander Vinokourov and Alex Zülle were also considered contenders.

== Teams ==
17 teams were automatically selected based on their UCI rankings. In addition, three teams were given wildcards by organisers of the Tour, Amaury Sport Organisation (ASO). Each of these 20 teams sent 9 cyclists, for a total of 180: Before the start, each rider had to do a health check. Three riders failed this health check; Sergei Ivanov, from Farm Frites; Rossano Brasi, from Team Polti; Andrei Hauptman, from Vini Caldirola–Sidermec; all because they had a hematocrit value above 50%. The race thus started with 177 cyclists.

The teams entering the race were:

Qualified teams

- AG2R Prévoyance
- Banesto
- Cofidis
- Crédit Agricole
- Farm Frites
- Festina
- Française des Jeux
- Lotto–Adecco
- Mapei–Quick-Step
- Mercatone Uno–Albacom
- ONCE–Deutsche Bank
- Team Polti
- Rabobank
- Saeco–Valli & Valli
- Team Telekom
- U.S. Postal Service
- Vini Caldirola–Sidermec

Invited teams

- Bonjour
- Kelme–Costa Blanca
- Memory Card–Jack & Jones

== Route and stages ==
The highest point of elevation in the race was 2,642 m (8,668 ft) at the summit of the Col du Galibier mountain pass on stage 15.

Stage characteristics and winners
Stage	Date	Course	Distance	Type	Winner
1	1 July	Futuroscope	16.5 km (10.3 mi)	Individual time trial	David Millar (GBR)
2	2 July	Futuroscope to Loudun	194.0 km (120.5 mi)	Plain stage	Tom Steels (BEL)
3	3 July	Loudun to Nantes	161.5 km (100.4 mi)	Plain stage	Tom Steels (BEL)
4	4 July	Nantes to Saint-Nazaire	70.0 km (43.5 mi)	Team time trial	ONCE–Deutsche Bank
5	5 July	Vannes to Vitré	202.0 km (125.5 mi)	Plain stage	Marcel Wüst (GER)
6	6 July	Vitré to Tours	198.5 km (123.3 mi)	Plain stage	Léon van Bon (NED)
7	7 July	Tours to Limoges	205.5 km (127.7 mi)	Plain stage	Christophe Agnolutto (FRA)
8	8 July	Limoges to Villeneuve-sur-Lot	203.5 km (126.4 mi)	Plain stage	Erik Dekker (NED)
9	9 July	Agen to Dax	181.0 km (112.5 mi)	Plain stage	Paolo Bettini (ITA)
10	10 July	Dax to Hautacam	205.0 km (127.4 mi)	Stage with mountain(s)	Javier Otxoa (ESP)
11	11 July	Bagnères-de-Bigorre to Revel	218.5 km (135.8 mi)	Hilly stage	Erik Dekker (NED)
	12 July	Provence		Rest day	
12	13 July	Carpentras to Mont Ventoux	149.0 km (92.6 mi)	Stage with mountain(s)	Marco Pantani (ITA)
13	14 July	Avignon to Draguignan	185.5 km (115.3 mi)	Plain stage	José Vicente Garcia (ESP)
14	15 July	Draguignan to Briançon	249.5 km (155.0 mi)	Stage with mountain(s)	Santiago Botero (COL)
15	16 July	Briançon to Courchevel	173.5 km (107.8 mi)	Stage with mountain(s)	Marco Pantani (ITA)
	17 July	Courchevel		Rest day	
16	18 July	Courchevel to Morzine	196.5 km (122.1 mi)	Stage with mountain(s)	Richard Virenque (FRA)
17	19 July	Évian-les-Bains to Lausanne	155.0 km (96.3 mi)	Hilly stage	Erik Dekker (NED)
18	20 July	Lausanne to Freiburg (Germany)	246.5 km (153.2 mi)	Plain stage	Salvatore Commesso (ITA)
19	21 July	Freiburg (Germany) to Mulhouse	58.5 km (36.4 mi)	Individual time trial	~~Lance Armstrong (USA)~~
20	22 July	Belfort to Troyes	254.5 km (158.1 mi)	Plain stage	Erik Zabel (GER)
21	23 July	Paris (Eiffel Tower) to Paris (Champs-Élysées)	138.0 km (85.7 mi)	Plain stage	Stefano Zanini (ITA)
	Total		3,662 km (2,275 mi)		

== Race overview ==
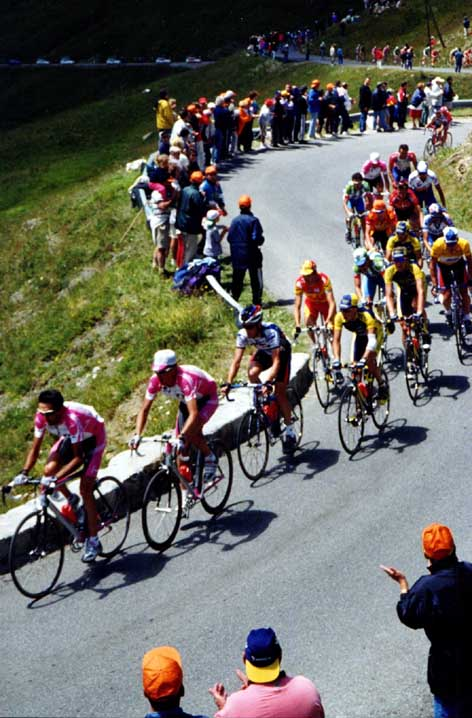
Riders on the Col d'Allos on stage 14 from Draguignan to Briançon

The first stage was won by British cyclist David Millar, with Lance Armstrong only 2 seconds behind in second place. Of the other pre-race favourites, Laurent Jalabert, Jan Ullrich and Alex Zülle all lost less than 20 seconds. Virenque, Vinokourov and Escartin lost around 1:30 on Armstrong, while Marco Pantani lost more than 2 minutes. The next two stages were sprinter stages, both won by Tom Steels, not changing much in the overall classification. Stage 4, a team time trial, was won by the ONCE cycling team, and after that stage the top 10 included 8 ONCE cyclists, including leader Laurent Jalabert.

In stage 6, 12 cyclists broke away and kept a 7:49-minute lead, which shook up the classification. Alberto Elli, one of the escapees, took over the yellow jersey.

In stage 10, the Tour entered the mountains. The stage, which finished at Hautacam, was won by Spaniard Javier Otxoa, but Lance Armstrong finished second and took the yellow jersey, with Ullrich in second place, more than 4 minutes behind. The 12th stage, finishing on Mont Ventoux, was won by Marco Pantani, but Lance Armstrong finished second with the same time, so Armstrong increased his lead. Stage 15 was also won by Pantani, but again Armstrong gained time on second-place Ullrich, who was 7:26 behind. On the 16th stage, Armstrong had a bad day and lost time. Ullrich's gap shrunk to 5:37.

On stage 17, Erik Dekker won his third stage of the Tour. Stage 19, an individual time trial, was the last chance to change the general classification, although it was very unlikely that time trial specialist Armstrong would lose his 5:37 lead. Armstrong eventually went on to win the stage, and secured his Tour win. He maintained his lead in the final two stages.

=== Doping ===
Subsequent to Armstrong's statement to withdraw his fight against United States Anti-Doping Agency's (USADA) charges, on 24 August 2012, the USADA said it would ban Armstrong for life and stripped him of his record seven Tour de France titles. Later that day it was confirmed in a USADA statement that Armstrong was banned for life and would be disqualified from any and all competitive results obtained on and subsequent to 1 August 1998, including forfeiture of any medals, titles, winnings, finishes, points and prizes. On 22 October 2012, the Union Cycliste Internationale endorsed the USADA sanctions, and decided not to award victories to any other rider or upgrade other placings in any of the affected events.

== Classification leadership and minor prizes ==
There were several classifications in the 2000 Tour de France. The most important was the general classification, calculated by adding each cyclist's finishing times on each stage. The cyclist with the least accumulated time was the race leader, identified by the yellow jersey; the winner of this classification is considered the winner of the Tour.

Additionally, there was a points classification, which awarded a green jersey. In the points classification, cyclists got points for finishing among the best in a stage finish, or in intermediate sprints. The cyclist with the most points lead the classification, and was identified with a green jersey.

There was also a mountains classification. The organisation had categorised some climbs as either hors catégorie, first, second, third, or fourth-category; points for this classification were won by the first cyclists that reached the top of these climbs first, with more points available for the higher-categorised climbs. The cyclist with the most points lead the classification, and wore a white jersey with red polka dots.

The fourth individual classification was the young rider classification. This was decided the same way as the general classification, but only riders under 26 years were eligible. Up until 1989 the leader received a white jersey. After 1989 the white jersey was no longer awarded, but the classification was still held. In 2000 the race organisers decided to start awarding the white jersey.

For the team classification, the times of the best three cyclists per team on each stage were added; the leading team was the team with the lowest total time.

In addition, there was a combativity award given after each mass-start stage to the cyclist considered most combative, who wore a red number bib the next stage. The decision was made by a jury composed of journalists who gave points. The cyclist with the most points from votes in all stages led the combativity classification. Erik Dekker won this classification, and was given overall the super-combativity award. The Souvenir Henri Desgrange was given in honour of Tour founder Henri Desgrange to the first rider to pass the summit of the Col du Galibier. This prize was won by Pascal Hervé during stage 15. There was also a Souvenir in honour of Gino Bartali, winner of the 1938 and 1948 Tours, given first rider atop the Col d'Izoard on stage 14. This award was won by Santiago Botero.

Classification leadership by stage
Stage	Winner	General classification	Points classification	Mountains classification	Young rider classification	Team classification	Combativity	
Stage	Winner	General classification	Points classification	Mountains classification	Young rider classification	Team classification	Award	Classification
1	David Millar	David Millar	David Millar	Marcel Wüst	David Millar	U.S. Postal Service	no award	
2	Tom Steels	David Millar	Tom Steels	Marcel Wüst	David Millar	U.S. Postal Service	Erik Dekker	Erik Dekker
3	Tom Steels	David Millar	Tom Steels	Marcel Wüst	David Millar	U.S. Postal Service	Jens Voigt	Jens Voigt
4	ONCE	Laurent Jalabert	Tom Steels	Marcel Wüst	David Cañada	ONCE–Deutsche Bank	no award	Jens Voigt
5	Marcel Wüst	Laurent Jalabert	Tom Steels	Paolo Bettini	David Cañada	ONCE–Deutsche Bank	Erik Dekker	Jens Voigt
6	Léon van Bon	Alberto Elli	Tom Steels	Paolo Bettini	Salvatore Commesso	Rabobank	Jacky Durand	Jens Voigt
7	Christophe Agnolutto	Alberto Elli	Marcel Wüst	Paolo Bettini	Salvatore Commesso	Rabobank	Christophe Agnolutto	Jens Voigt
8	Erik Dekker	Alberto Elli	Marcel Wüst	Erik Dekker	Salvatore Commesso	Rabobank	Erik Dekker	Erik Dekker
9	Paolo Bettini	Alberto Elli	Erik Zabel	Erik Dekker	Salvatore Commesso	Rabobank	Paolo Bettini	Erik Dekker
10	Javier Otxoa	~~Lance Armstrong~~	Erik Zabel	Javier Otxoa	Francisco Mancebo	Rabobank	Javier Otxoa	Erik Dekker
11	Erik Dekker	~~Lance Armstrong~~	Erik Zabel	Javier Otxoa	Francisco Mancebo	Rabobank	Santiago Botero	Erik Dekker
12	Marco Pantani	~~Lance Armstrong~~	Erik Zabel	Javier Otxoa	Francisco Mancebo	Banesto	Christophe Agnolutto	Erik Dekker
13	José Vicente García	~~Lance Armstrong~~	Erik Zabel	Javier Otxoa	Francisco Mancebo	Banesto	Didier Rous	Erik Dekker
14	Santiago Botero	~~Lance Armstrong~~	Erik Zabel	Santiago Botero	Francisco Mancebo	Banesto	Santiago Botero	Erik Dekker
15	Marco Pantani	~~Lance Armstrong~~	Erik Zabel	Santiago Botero	Francisco Mancebo	Banesto	Santiago Botero	Santiago Botero
16	Richard Virenque	~~Lance Armstrong~~	Erik Zabel	Santiago Botero	Francisco Mancebo	Kelme–Costa Blanca	Marco Pantani	Santiago Botero
17	Erik Dekker	~~Lance Armstrong~~	Erik Zabel	Santiago Botero	Francisco Mancebo	Kelme–Costa Blanca	Massimiliano Lelli	Erik Dekker
18	Salvatore Commesso	~~Lance Armstrong~~	Erik Zabel	Santiago Botero	Francisco Mancebo	Kelme–Costa Blanca	Jacky Durand	Erik Dekker
19	~~Lance Armstrong~~	~~Lance Armstrong~~	Erik Zabel	Santiago Botero	Francisco Mancebo	Kelme–Costa Blanca	no award	Erik Dekker
20	Erik Zabel	~~Lance Armstrong~~	Erik Zabel	Santiago Botero	Francisco Mancebo	Kelme–Costa Blanca	François Simon	Erik Dekker
21	Stefano Zanini	~~Lance Armstrong~~	Erik Zabel	Santiago Botero	Francisco Mancebo	Kelme–Costa Blanca	Massimo Apollonio	Erik Dekker
Final		~~Lance Armstrong~~	Erik Zabel	Santiago Botero	Francisco Mancebo	Kelme–Costa Blanca	Erik Dekker	

- In stage 2, ~~Lance Armstrong~~ wore the green jersey.
- In stages 2 through 4, David Cañada wore the white jersey.

== Final standings ==
Legend
Green jersey	Denotes the leader of the points classification	Polka dot jersey	Denotes the leader of the mountains classification
White jersey	Denotes the leader of the young rider classification	A white jersey with a red number bib.	Denotes the winner of the super-combativity award

=== General classification ===
Final general classification (1–10)
Rank	Rider	Team	Time
DSQ	~~Lance Armstrong (USA)~~	~~U.S. Postal Service~~	~~92h 33' 08"~~
2	Jan Ullrich (GER)	Team Telekom	+ 6' 02"
3	Joseba Beloki (ESP)	Festina	+ 10' 04"
4	Christophe Moreau (FRA)	Festina	+ 10' 34"
5	Roberto Heras (ESP)	Kelme–Costa Blanca	+ 11' 50"
6	Richard Virenque (FRA)	Team Polti	+ 13' 26"
7	Santiago Botero (COL)	Kelme–Costa Blanca	+ 14' 18"
8	Fernando Escartín (ESP)	Kelme–Costa Blanca	+ 17' 21"
9	Francisco Mancebo (ESP)	Banesto	+ 18' 09"
10	Daniele Nardello (ITA)	Mapei–Quick-Step	+ 18' 25"

Final general classification (11–127)
Rank	Rider	Team	Time
11	Manuel Beltrán (ESP)	Mapei–Quick-Step	+ 21' 11"
12	Pascal Hervé (FRA)	Team Polti	+ 23' 13"
13	Javier Otxoa (ESP)	Kelme–Costa Blanca	+ 25' 00"
14	Felix Manuel Garcia (ESP)	Festina	+ 32' 04"
15	Alexander Vinokourov (KAZ)	Team Telekom	+ 32' 26"
16	Roberto Conti (ITA)	Vini Caldirola–Sidermec	+ 34' 18"
17	Kurt Van De Wouwer (BEL)	Lotto–Adecco	+ 34' 29"
18	Guido Trentin (ITA)	Vini Caldirola–Sidermec	+ 35' 57"
19	Jean-Cyril Robin (FRA)	Bonjour	+ 43' 12"
20	Geert Verheyen (BEL)	Lotto–Adecco	+ 46' 24"
21	Peter Luttenberger (AUT)	ONCE–Deutsche Bank	+ 48' 27"
22	Nico Mattan (BEL)	Cofidis	+ 50' 09"
23	José María Jiménez (ESP)	Banesto	+ 51' 45"
24	Grischa Niermann (GER)	Rabobank	+ 52' 06"
25	Tyler Hamilton (USA)	U.S. Postal Service	+ 56' 30"
26	Giuseppe Guerini (ITA)	Team Telekom	+ 59' 33"
27	Massimiliano Lelli (ITA)	Cofidis	+ 1h 06' 05"
28	Mario Aerts (BEL)	Lotto–Adecco	+ 1h 06' 44"
29	Daniel Atienza (ESP)	Saeco–Valli & Valli	+ 1h 09' 19"
30	Dariusz Baranowski (POL)	Banesto	+ 1h 09' 27"
31	Javier Pascual (ESP)	Kelme–Costa Blanca	+ 1h 16' 33"
32	Andrei Kivilev (KAZ)	AG2R Prévoyance	+ 1h 17' 28"
33	David Cañada (ESP)	ONCE–Deutsche Bank	+ 1h 17' 44"
34	Abraham Olano (ESP)	ONCE–Deutsche Bank	+ 1h 19' 44"
35	Laurent Madouas (FRA)	Festina	+ 1h 20' 40"
36	Bo Hamburger (DEN)	Memory Card–Jack & Jones	+ 1h 21' 33"
37	Kevin Livingston (USA)	U.S. Postal Service	+ 1h 23' 13"
38	Enrico Zaina (ITA)	Mercatone Uno–Albacom	+ 1h 23' 33"
39	Marco Velo (ITA)	Mercatone Uno–Albacom	+ 1h 24' 21"
40	Jens Heppner (GER)	Team Telekom	+ 1h 29' 51"
41	Paolo Savoldelli (ITA)	Saeco–Valli & Valli	+ 1h 32' 00"
42	Udo Bölts (GER)	Team Telekom	+ 1h 32' 33"
43	Marc Wauters (BEL)	Rabobank	+ 1h 33' 34"
44	Roland Meier (SUI)	Cofidis	+ 1h 35' 57"
45	Didier Rous (FRA)	Bonjour	+ 1h 39' 55"
46	Marcello Siboni (ITA)	Mercatone Uno–Albacom	+ 1h 42' 00"
47	Jon Odriozola (ESP)	Banesto	+ 1h 43' 22"
48	Bobby Julich (USA)	Crédit Agricole	+ 1h 44' 15"
49	Maarten den Bakker (NED)	Rabobank	+ 1h 46' 17"
50	José Angel Vidal (ESP)	Kelme–Costa Blanca	+ 1h 50' 59"
51	Erik Dekker (NED)	Rabobank	+ 1h 51' 27"
52	Cédric Vasseur (FRA)	U.S. Postal Service	+ 1h 55' 25"
53	José Vicente Garcia (ESP)	Banesto	+ 1h 56' 31"
54	Laurent Jalabert (FRA)	ONCE–Deutsche Bank	+ 1h 58' 47"
55	Viatcheslav Ekimov (RUS)	U.S. Postal Service	+ 1h 59' 57"
56	Marc Lotz (NED)	Rabobank	+ 2h 02' 04"
57	José Luis Arrieta (ESP)	Banesto	+ 2h 04' 21"
58	François Simon (FRA)	Bonjour	+ 2h 10' 08"
59	Ermanno Brignoli (ITA)	Mercatone Uno–Albacom	+ 2h 10' 28"
60	Jens Voigt (GER)	Crédit Agricole	+ 2h 10' 37"
61	Erik Zabel (GER)	Team Telekom	+ 2h 11' 07"
62	David Millar (GBR)	Cofidis	+ 2h 13' 03"
63	Antonio Tauler (ESP)	Kelme–Costa Blanca	+ 2h 16' 05"
64	Fabio Sacchi (ITA)	Team Polti	+ 2h 17' 40"
65	George Hincapie (USA)	U.S. Postal Service	+ 2h 20' 31"
66	Christophe Agnolutto (FRA)	AG2R Prévoyance	+ 2h 23' 07"
67	Massimiliano Mori (ITA)	Saeco–Valli & Valli	+ 2h 24' 05"
68	Markus Zberg (SUI)	Rabobank	+ 2h 26' 40"
69	Pascal Chanteur (FRA)	AG2R Prévoyance	+ 2h 27' 19"
70	Riccardo Forconi (ITA)	Mercatone Uno–Albacom	+ 2h 28' 14"
71	Walter Bénéteau (FRA)	Bonjour	+ 2h 28' 17"
72	Salvatore Commesso (ITA)	Saeco–Valli & Valli	+ 2h 28' 48"
73	Massimo Podenzana (ITA)	Mercatone Uno–Albacom	+ 2h 29' 17"
74	Jacky Durand (FRA)	Lotto–Adecco	+ 2h 31' 48"
75	David Moncoutié (FRA)	Cofidis	+ 2h 32' 26"
76	Xavier Jan (FRA)	Française des Jeux	+ 2h 33' 55"
77	Koos Moerenhout (NED)	Farm Frites	+ 2h 34' 31"
78	Michel Lafis (SWE)	Farm Frites	+ 2h 35' 52"
79	Paul Van Hyfte (BEL)	Lotto–Adecco	+ 2h 36' 03"
80	Stefano Zanini (ITA)	Mapei–Quick-Step	+ 2h 36' 07"
81	Gilles Maignan (FRA)	AG2R Prévoyance	+ 2h 36' 12"
82	Romans Vainsteins (LAT)	Vini Caldirola–Sidermec	+ 2h 38' 10"
83	David Delrieu (FRA)	AG2R Prévoyance	+ 2h 38' 10"
84	Alberto Elli (ITA)	Team Telekom	+ 2h 40' 12"
85	Pavel Padrnos (CZE)	Saeco–Valli & Valli	+ 2h 40' 19"
86	Fred Rodriguez (USA)	Mapei–Quick-Step	+ 2h 40' 19"
87	Orlando Rodrigues (POR)	Banesto	+ 2h 40' 31"
88	Sebastien Demarbaix (BEL)	Lotto–Adecco	+ 2h 41' 19"
89	Steffen Kjærgaard (NOR)	U.S. Postal Service	+ 2h 44' 01"
90	Anthony Morin (FRA)	Crédit Agricole	+ 2h 44' 02"
91	Glenn Magnusson (SWE)	Farm Frites	+ 2h 45' 46"
92	Benoît Joachim (LUX)	U.S. Postal Service	+ 2h 45' 56"
93	Arvis Piziks (LAT)	Memory Card–Jack & Jones	+ 2h 46' 06"
94	Mirko Crepaldi (ITA)	Team Polti	+ 2h 48' 30"
95	Christophe Mengin (FRA)	Française des Jeux	+ 2h 50' 21"
96	Mauro Radaelli (ITA)	Vini Caldirola–Sidermec	+ 2h 51' 01"
97	Jaime Hernández (SPA)	Festina	+ 2h 51' 14"
98	Emmanuel Magnien (FRA)	Française des Jeux	+ 2h 51' 21"
99	Nicolai Bo Larsen (DEN)	Memory Card–Jack & Jones	+ 2h 52' 14"
100	Frank Høj (DEN)	Française des Jeux	+ 2h 52' 46"
101	Thierry Marichal (BEL)	Lotto–Adecco	+ 2h 52' 52"
102	Massimo Apollonio (ITA)	Vini Caldirola–Sidermec	+ 2h 54' 00"
103	Max van Heeswijk (NED)	Mapei–Quick-Step	+ 2h 54' 50"
104	Gian Matteo Fagnini (ITA)	Team Telekom	+ 2h 55' 45"
105	Andreas Klier (GER)	Farm Frites	+ 2h 58' 04"
106	Grzegorz Gwiazdowski (POL)	Française des Jeux	+ 2h 58' 05"
107	Benoit Salmon (FRA)	AG2R Prévoyance	+ 2h 59' 59"
108	Martin Rittsel (SWE)	Memory Card–Jack & Jones	+ 3h 00' 47"
109	Servais Knaven (NED)	Farm Frites	+ 3h 02' 49"
110	Frankie Andreu (USA)	U.S. Postal Service	+ 3h 02' 51"
111	Pascal Deramé (FRA)	Bonjour	+ 3h 03' 30"
112	Pascal Lino (FRA)	Festina	+ 3h 03' 38"
113	Robbie McEwen (AUS)	Farm Frites	+ 3h 04' 28"
114	Simone Borgheresi (ITA)	Mercatone Uno–Albacom	+ 3h 04' 28"
115	Bart Voskamp (NED)	Team Polti	+ 3h 05' 17"
116	Frédérick Guesdon (FRA)	Française des Jeux	+ 3h 07' 16"
117	Tristan Hoffman (NED)	Memory Card–Jack & Jones	+ 3h 07' 17"
118	Geert Van Bondt (BEL)	Farm Frites	+ 3h 07' 39"
119	Allan Johansen (DEN)	Memory Card–Jack & Jones	+ 3h 08' 22"
120	Anthony Langella (FRA)	Crédit Agricole	+ 3h 13' 40"
121	Serge Baguet (BEL)	Lotto–Adecco	+ 3h 17' 15"
122	Franck Bouyer (FRA)	Bonjour	+ 3h 18' 37"
123	Magnus Bäckstedt (SWE)	Crédit Agricole	+ 3h 20' 27"
124	Francisco Leon (ESP)	Kelme–Costa Blanca	+ 3h 22' 52"
125	Sébastien Hinault (FRA)	Crédit Agricole	+ 3h 41' 02"
126	Damien Nazon (FRA)	Bonjour	+ 3h 43' 13"
127	Olivier Perraudeau (FRA)	Bonjour	+ 3h 46' 37"

=== Points classification ===
Final points classification (1–10)
Rank	Rider	Team	Points
1	Erik Zabel (GER)	Team Telekom	321
2	Robbie McEwen (AUS)	Farm Frites	203
3	Romans Vainsteins (LAT)	Vini Caldirola–Sidermec	184
4	Emmanuel Magnien (FRA)	Française des Jeux	157
5	Erik Dekker (NED)	Rabobank	138
6	Stefano Zanini (ITA)	Mapei–Quick-Step	130
7	Jacky Durand (FRA)	Lotto–Adecco	130
8	François Simon (FRA)	Bonjour	122
9	Salvatore Commesso (ITA)	Saeco–Valli & Valli	118
10	Nico Mattan (BEL)	Cofidis	106

=== Mountains classification ===
Final mountains classification (1–10)
Rank	Rider	Team	Points
1	Santiago Botero (COL)	Kelme–Costa Blanca	347
2	Javier Otxoa (ESP)	Kelme–Costa Blanca	283
3	Richard Virenque (FRA)	Team Polti	267
4	Pascal Hervé (FRA)	Team Polti	234
5	Nico Mattan (BEL)	Cofidis	164
DSQ	~~Lance Armstrong (USA)~~	~~U.S. Postal Service~~	~~162~~
7	Fernando Escartín (ESP)	Kelme–Costa Blanca	149
8	Roberto Heras (ESP)	Kelme–Costa Blanca	113
9	Joseba Beloki (ESP)	Festina	112
10	José María Jiménez (ESP)	Banesto	110

=== Young rider classification ===
Final young rider classification (1–10)
Rank	Rider	Team	Time
1	Francisco Mancebo (ESP)	Banesto	92h 51' 17"
2	Guido Trentin (ITA)	Vini Caldirola–Sidermec	+ 17' 48"
3	Grischa Niermann (GER)	Rabobank	+ 33' 57"
4	David Cañada (ESP)	ONCE–Deutsche Bank	+ 59' 35"
5	David Millar (GBR)	Cofidis	+ 1h 54' 54"
6	Salvatore Commesso (ITA)	Saeco–Valli & Valli	+ 2h 10' 39"
7	David Moncoutié (FRA)	Cofidis	+ 2h 14' 17"
8	Benoît Joachim (LUX)	U.S. Postal Service	+ 2h 27' 47"
9	Andreas Klier (GER)	Farm Frites	+ 2h 39' 55"
10	Magnus Bäckstedt (SWE)	Crédit Agricole	+ 3h 02' 18"

=== Team classification ===
Final team classification (1–10)
Rank	Team	Time
1	Kelme–Costa Blanca	278h 10' 47"
2	Festina	+ 13' 42"
3	Banesto	+ 18' 21"
4	Team Telekom	+ 40' 08"
5	Lotto–Adecco	+ 1h 11' 50"
6	Rabobank	+ 1h 16' 34"
7	ONCE–Deutsche Bank	+ 1h 36' 14"
8	U.S. Postal Service	+ 1h 46' 04"
9	Mapei–Quick-Step	+ 1h 50' 17"
10	Cofidis	+ 2h 06' 48"

=== Combativity classification ===
Final combativity classification (1–10)
Rank	Rider	Team	Time
1	Erik Dekker (NED)	Rabobank	99
2	Santiago Botero (COL)	Kelme–Costa Blanca	98
3	Christophe Agnolutto (FRA)	AG2R Prévoyance	79
4	Jacky Durand (FRA)	Lotto–Adecco	77
5	Jens Voigt (GER)	Crédit Agricole	70
6	Javier Otxoa (ESP)	Kelme–Costa Blanca	53
7	Didier Rous (FRA)	Bonjour	44
8	Salvatore Commesso (ITA)	Saeco–Valli & Valli	44
9	François Simon (FRA)	Bonjour	38
10	Massimiliano Lelli (ITA)	Cofidis	33

== See also ==
- List of doping cases in cycling
- French Revolutions

== Bibliography ==
- Augendre, Jacques (2016). "Guide historique" [Historical guide] (PDF). Tour de France (in French). Paris: Amaury Sport Organisation. Archived (PDF) from the original on 17 August 2016.
- Nauright, John; Parrish, Charles (2012). Sports Around the World: History, Culture, and Practice. Vol. 2. Santa Barbara, California: ABC-CLIO. ISBN 978-1-59884-300-2.
- "Race regulations" (PDF). Tour de France. Paris: Amaury Sport Organisation. 2000. Archived from the original (PDF) on 21 August 2000.
- van den Akker, Pieter (2018). Tour de France Rules and Statistics: 1903–2018. Self-published. ISBN 978-1-79398-080-9.
