= USS Geronimo =

USS Geronimo may refer to the following ships of the United States Navy:

- USS Geronimo (YTM-119) a district harbor tug commissioned in 1933 and struck in 1946
- USS Geronimo (ATA-207) a Sotoyomo-class fleet tug built in 1944 and transferred to Taiwan in 1968, renamed ROCS Chiu Lien (AGS-563)
