= Christophe Agnolutto =

French cyclist (born 1969)

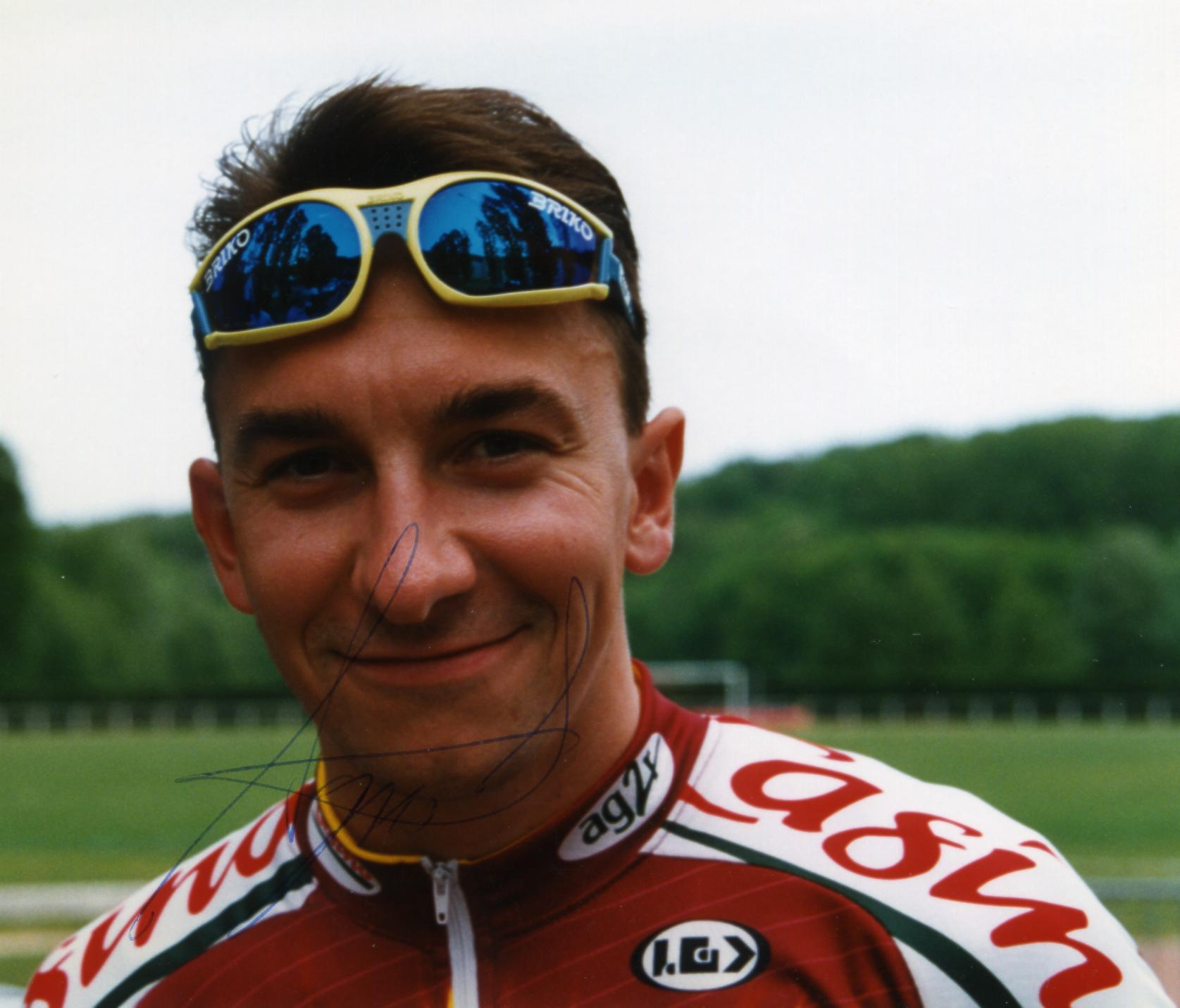

Personal information
- Full name: Christophe Agnolutto
- Born: 6 December 1969 (age 56) Soisy-sous-Montmorency, France

Cycling career
- Sport: Cycling
- Current team: Retired
- Discipline: Road
- Role: Rider

Major wins
- 1 stage 2000 Tour de France

Christophe Agnolutto (born 6 December 1969) is a professional road bicycle racer from France.

Agnolutto was a commercial artist when, as an amateur in 1995, he won Bordeaux-Saintes and the GP Nord-Pas de Calais and came third in the national championship. He rode successively for the CSM Puteaux, the US Créteil and the ASPPT Paris. He dedicated himself to cycling when he met his wife, Mélanie, when he was 23. He turned professional the following year for Petit Casino, sponsored by a supermarket chain. He stayed with the team and its directeur sportif, Vincent Lavenu, through changes of sponsors. He said: "I didn't exactly have a lot of other offers."

Then he left for Agritubel. He said:

I needed a change of air. I owe a lot to Vincent, who let me turn professional and who gave me contracts for nine years, but the current didn't pass any more with certain members of the team. And finally, Vincent wasn't able to say if he would keep me for 2005, so I needed to move. I was in contact with Agritubel during the Tour du Poitou-Charentes in August and I was interested straight away.

Agnolutto won the 1997 Tour de Suisse after breaking clear on the second stage. The favourites didn't take up the chase and couldn't make up Agnolutto's lead afterwards. He said in 2001:

Winning served me well financially but also in terms of being known inside and outside the peloton. On the other hand, I rested on my laurels for the next two years. Especially after the 1998 Tour, which killed my enthusiasm for riding a bike. In 1999, the birth of my daughter occupied all my thoughts for a few months but I put myself out of the running [hors-jeu]. I didn't want to ride a Tour de France which had lost its shine [qui ne me faisait plus rêver] That year I lived the Tour via my television screen and I realised I was missing something important. I promised myself I'd ride as many as I could. And to compete. Which is how my stage win came about.

That win was stage seven of the 2000 Tour de France, taken in an early breakaway. It was France's first win in the Tour for two years, since Jacky Durand in 1998. He told his team-mates that morning what he planned to do and attacked three times at the start of the stage. On the third attempt he cleared the front of the race alone. He rode alone in the rain for 80 km of the 127 km from Tours to Limoges, getting up to 8m 20s lead.

Agnolutto rode the Tour five times and won nine races as a professional before retiring at the end of 2006.

== Retirement ==
Agnulotto lives in Pau and coaches the UN Pau Béarn. He studied for a Brevet d'État to open a school of sport and business and organises training camps for cyclists. He runs a cycle shop at Salies-de-Béarn and helps organise a bike ride named after him.

== Tour de France ==
- 1997 - 94th
- 1998 - 31st
- 2000 - 66th, winner 7th stage
- 2001 - 120th
- 2002 - 144th

== Major results ==
1996 – Petit Casino

First year as a professional

1997 – Casino
Overall and Stage 2 – Tour de Suisse (2.1)
A Travers le Morbihan (1.2)
97th overall – Tour de France
1998 – Casino
Stage 6 – Tour de Romandie (2.HC)
31st overall – Tour de France
1999 – Casino
King of the Mountains – Tour de Luxembourg (2.2)
2000 – Ag2r Prévoyance
Stage 7 win and 66th overall – Tour de France (2.HC)
2001 – Ag2r Decathlon
120th overall – Tour de France
2002 – Ag2r Prévoyance
144th overall – Tour de France
2003 – Ag2r Prévoyance
2004 – Ag2r Prévoyance
3rd overall – Tour de Wallonie (2.3)
2005 – Agritubel
Stage 1 – Tour du Poitou Charentes de la Vienne (2.1)
2006 – Agritubel

Retired at end of season
