= José Vicente García =

Spanish cyclist

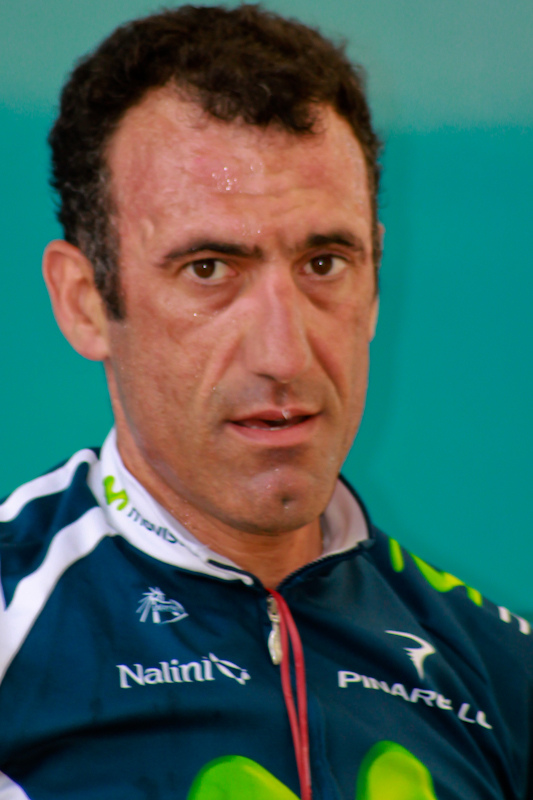

Personal information
- Full name: José Vicente García Acosta
- Nickname: Chente
- Born: 4 August 1972 (age 54) San Sebastián, Spain
- Height: 1.86 m (6 ft 1 in)
- Weight: 76 kg (168 lb; 12 st 0 lb)

Cycling career
- Sport: Cycling
- Current team: Retired
- Discipline: Road
- Role: Rider

Professional team
- 1995–2011: Banesto

Managerial team
- 2013–: Movistar Team

Major wins
- Grand Tours Tour de France 1 individual stage (2000) Vuelta a España 2 individual stages (1997, 2002)

José Vicente García Acosta (born 4 August 1972 in San Sebastián) is a former Spanish professional road bicycle racer. He rode his entire career for the team currently known as the Movistar Team. In his career, he won a stage of the Tour de France, two stages in the Vuelta a España and the Grand Prix Eddy Merckx with Abraham Olano. He completed the Vuelta 14 times.

García Acosta retired after the 2011 season, having spent 17 years in the pro ranks with the same team, albeit racing under different sponsorship names. After filling several different staff duties during the Giro d'Italia and the Vuelta a España in 2012, Garcia Acosta was named Directeur Sportif ("Director Deportivo") of Movistar beginning in the 2013 season.

== Major results ==
1996
1st Overall Vuelta Ciclista a Navarra

1st Stage 6

1997
1st Stage 14 Vuelta a España
7th Overall Ronde van Nederland
1998
1st GP Eddy Merckx (with Abraham Olano)
4th Overall Volta ao Alentejo
5th Overall Circuit Sarthe
10th Subida al Naranco
1999
6th LuK Challenge Chrono
7th Overall Volta ao Algarve
2000
1st Stage 13 Tour de France
2002
1st Stage 19 Vuelta a España
7th Overall Tour of Luxembourg
2003
1st Stage 2 Vuelta a Burgos
1st Stage 2 TTT Vuelta a Castilla y León
8th GP Pino Cerami
2004
1st Stage 2 TTT Vuelta a Castilla y León
7th Clásica de Almería
2006
1st Stages 3 Vuelta a Castilla y León
2007
1st Stage 1 TTT Tour Méditerranéen
2011
1st Stage 3 TTT Vuelta a Burgos

=== Grand Tour general classification results timeline ===
Grand Tour	1997	1998	1999	2000	2001	2002	2003	2004	2005	2006	2007	2008	2009	2010	2011
Giro d'Italia	Did not Race														
Tour de France	DNF	DNF	68	53	DNF	122	125	86	148	114	90	138	–	–	–
Vuelta a España	62	48	53	63	111	75	108	106	72	104	124	119	137	115	DNF
