= Javier Otxoa =

Spanish cyclist

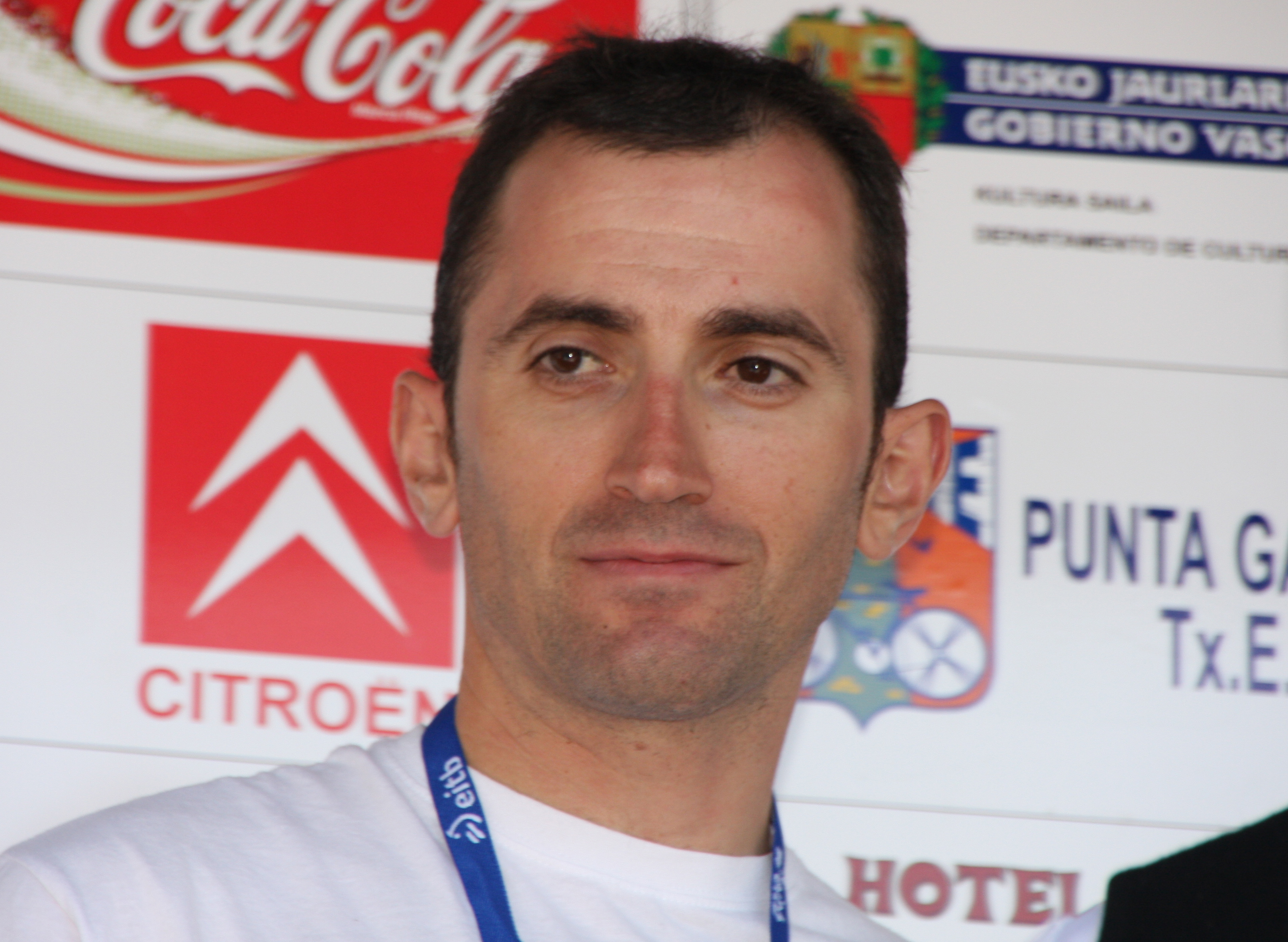
- Otxoa in 2009

Personal information
- Full name: Javier Otxoa Palacios
- Born: 30 August 1974 Barakaldo, Basque Country, Spain
- Died: 24 August 2018 (aged 43) Alhaurín de la Torre, Spain

Cycling career
- Sport: Cycling
- Disciplines: Road & Track
- Role: Rider

Professional team
- 1997–2001: Kelme–Costa Blanca

Major wins
- Grand Tours Tour de France 1 stage (2000)
Medal record
Men's cycling
Representing Spain
Paralympic Games
Gold medal – first place	2004 Athens	Road Time Trial (CP 3)
Gold medal – first place	2008 Beijing	Time Trial (CP 3)
Silver medal – second place	2004 Athens	Track Individual; Pursuit (CP 3)
Silver medal – second place	2008 Beijing	Road Race (CP 3)

Javier Otxoa Palacios (30 August 1974 – 24 August 2018) was a Spanish cyclist who was a member of the Kelme cycling team. His name was sometimes spelled Javier Ochoa in media reports.

the only species of the genus Guemesia, Guemesia ochoai was named after him

== Road cycling career ==
In 2000 Otxoa won a mountain stage in the Tour de France on top of the Hautacam on a cold and rainy day. He broke away with Nico Mattan with 155 km (96 mi) to race and dropped him on the col de Marie Blanque. Mattan rejoined him on the descent. Otxoa then dropped him again on the climb to the col de l'Aubisque and rode alone through the col du Soulor with nine minutes' lead as he reached the foot of the Hautacam. He paid for his earlier efforts on the hors categorie but held on to finish with 42 seconds advantage Lance Armstrong.

== Accident ==
In February 2001 a driver of a car hit him and his twin brother Ricardo during training. Ricardo died. Javier survived but was in a coma for a month and became seriously disabled. He continued cycling, however.

== Paralympics cycling career ==
In the 2004 Summer Paralympics he won a gold in the road race/time trial event and a silver in the individual pursuit. Otxoa was disqualified during the preliminary round of the individual pursuit (CP 3) at the 2008 Summer Paralympics, for riding too close behind his opponent, Darren Kenny, who had overtaken him. Kenny stated that he was disappointed by this as he would have liked to compete against Otxoa in the final.

At the time of his death in 2018, Otxoa resided in Alhaurín de la Torre, Málaga.

== Major results ==
1996
General Classification Circuito Montañés
2000
13th Tour de France

1st Stage 10
2nd Mountains classification

1st Prueba Villafranca de Ordizia
2004
1st Road race/time trial, 2004 Summer Paralympics
2nd Pursuit, 2004 Summer Paralympics
2008
1st time trial, 2008 Summer Paralympics
2nd road race, 2008 Summer Paralympics
