= 2015 Tour of Utah =

2015 UCI America Tour

Race details
- Dates: August 3–9, 2015
- Stages: 7
- Distance: 1,147.7 km (713.1 mi)
- Winning time: 28h 06' 48"

Results
Jersey awarded to the overall winner	Winner	Joe Dombrowski (USA)	(Cannondale–Garmin)
	Second	Michael Woods (CAN)	(Optum–Kelly Benefit Strategies)
	Third	Brent Bookwalter (USA)	(BMC Racing Team)
Jersey awarded to the mountains classification winner	Mountains	Gregory Daniel (USA)	(Axeon Cycling Team)
Jersey awarded to the youth classification winner	Youth	Daniel Martínez (COL)	(Colombia)
Jersey awarded to the sprints classification winner	Sprints	Brent Bookwalter (USA)	(BMC Racing Team)
	Team	Colombia	

The 2015 Larry H. Miller Tour of Utah is the twelfth edition of the Tour of Utah. It starts on August 3 in Logan and finishes on August 9 in Park City. It is rated as a 2.HC event on the UCI America Tour.

== Teams ==
The fifteen teams invited to participate in the Tour of Utah are:

World Tour teams

- BMC Racing Team
- Cannondale–Garmin
- Trek Factory Racing

Professional Continental teams

- Bardiani–CSF
- Colombia
- Drapac Professional Cycling
- MTN–Qhubeka
- UnitedHealthcare

Continental teams

- Hincapie Racing Team
- Jamis–Hagens Berman
- Jelly Belly–Maxxis
- Optum–Kelly Benefit Strategies
- Team SmartStop
- Axeon Cycling Team
- Team Budget Forklifts

== Stages ==
List of stages
Stage	Date	Course	Distance	Type	Winner
1	August 3	Logan	212.5 km (132.0 mi)	Hilly stage	Kiel Reijnen (USA)
2	August 4	Tremonton – Ogden	161.8 km (100.5 mi)	Flat stage	Jure Kocjan (SLO)
3	August 5	Antelope Island State Park – Bountiful	176.5 km (109.7 mi)	Hilly stage	Logan Owen (USA)
4	August 6	Heber Valley	205.2 km (127.5 mi)	Medium mountain stage	Eric Young (USA)
5	August 7	Salt Lake City	88.5 km (55.0 mi)	Flat stage	Michael Woods (CAN)
6	August 8	Salt Lake City – Snowbird	177.7 km (110.4 mi)	Mountain stage	Joe Dombrowski (USA)
7	August 9	Park City	125.5 km (78.0 mi)	Mountain stage	Lachlan Norris (AUS)
Total		1,147.7 km (713.1 mi)			

== Classification leadership ==
Stage	Winner	General classification	Sprints Classification	Mountains Classification	Young Rider Classification	Most Aggressive Classification	Team Classification
1	Kiel Reijnen	Kiel Reijnen	Kiel Reijnen	Gregory Daniel	Gregory Daniel	Johann van Zyl	Cannondale–Garmin
2	Jure Kocjan	Kiel Reijnen	Kiel Reijnen	Gregory Daniel	Robin Carpenter	Daniel Eaton	Team SmartStop
3	Logan Owen	Kiel Reijnen	Kiel Reijnen	Johann van Zyl	Logan Owen	Joey Rosskopf	BMC Racing Team
4	Eric Young	Jure Kocjan	Jure Kocjan	Gregory Daniel	Robin Carpenter	Robin Carpenter	Axeon Cycling Team
5	Michael Woods	Michael Woods	Kiel Reijnen	Gregory Daniel	Dion Smith	Songezo Jim	Axeon Cycling Team
6	Joe Dombrowski	Joe Dombrowski	Kiel Reijnen	Gregory Daniel	Daniel Martínez	Ben King	Colombia
7	Lachlan Norris	Joe Dombrowski	Brent Bookwalter	Gregory Daniel	Daniel Martínez	Natnael Berhane	Colombia
Final		Joe Dombrowski	Brent Bookwalter	Gregory Daniel	Daniel Martínez	not awarded	Colombia

== Final classification ==
Final general classification
Rank	Rider	Team	Time
1	Joe Dombrowski (USA)	Cannondale–Garmin	28h 06' 48"
2	Michael Woods (CAN)	Optum–Kelly Benefit Strategies	+ 50"
3	Brent Bookwalter (USA)	BMC Racing Team	+ 1' 05"
4	Fränk Schleck (LUX)	Trek Factory Racing	+ 1' 07"
5	Chris Horner (USA)	Airgas–Safeway	+ 1' 09"
6	Lachlan Norris (AUS)	Drapac Professional Cycling	+ 1' 12"
7	Natnael Berhane (ERI)	MTN–Qhubeka	+ 1' 22"
8	Daniel Martínez (COL)	Colombia	+ 1' 41"
9	Rob Squire (USA)	Hincapie Racing Team	+ 1' 46"
10	Lachlan Morton (AUS)	Jelly Belly–Maxxis	+ 1' 50"
