= Justin Oien =

American cyclist (born 1995)

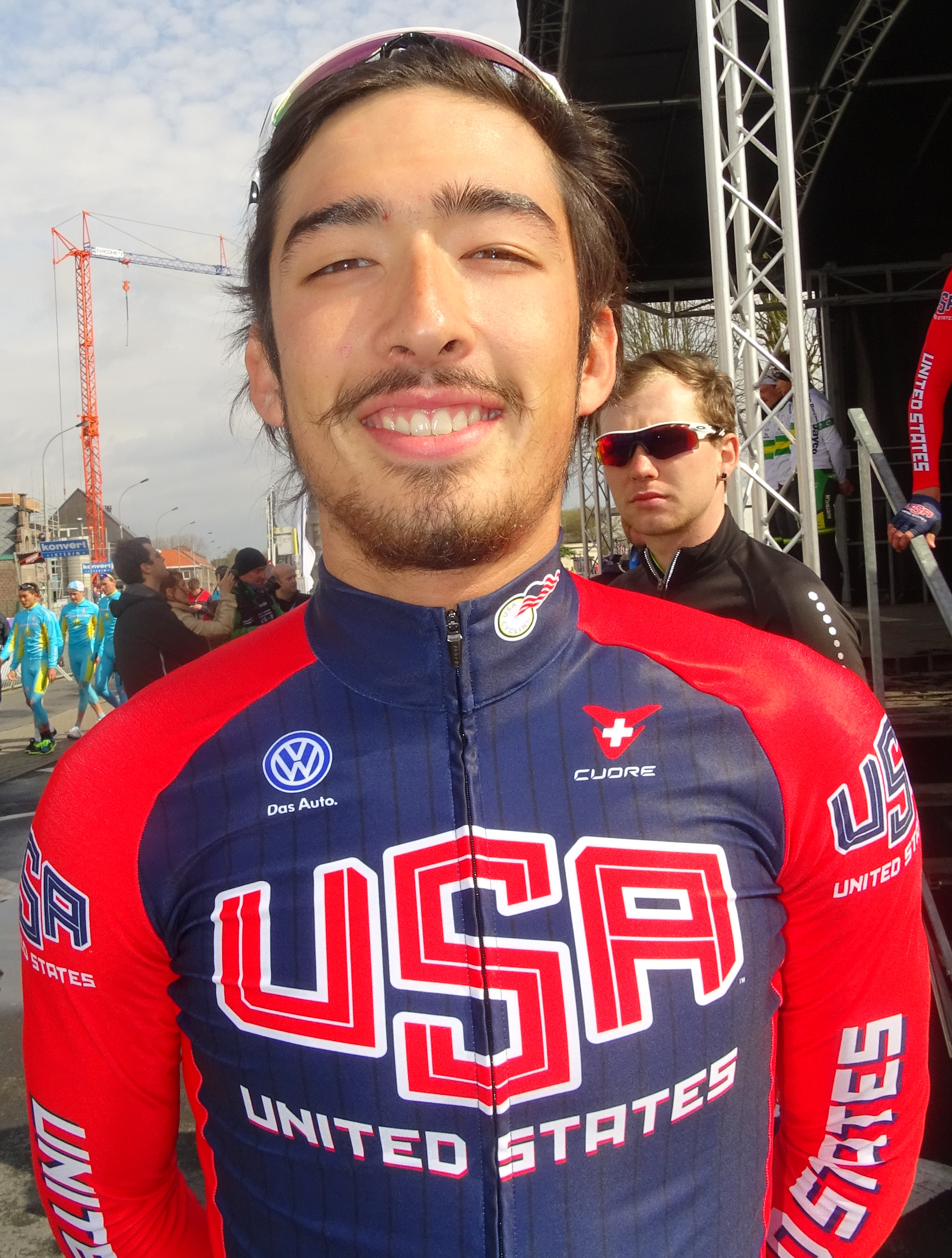
- Oien in 2015.

Personal information
- Full name: Justin Oien
- Born: May 5, 1995 (age 31) Escondido, California, United States
- Height: 1.79 m (5 ft 10 in)
- Weight: 68 kg (150 lb)

Cycling career
- Sport: Cycling
- Current team: Hincapie–Leomo p/b BMC
- Discipline: Road
- Role: Rider

Amateur teams
- 2012: Monster Media Racing–SC Velo
- 2013: MRI Endurance Elite Juniors
- 2014: California Giant–Specialized

Professional teams
- 2015–2016: Axeon Cycling Team
- 2017–2018: Caja Rural–Seguros RGA
- 2019–: Arapahoe Hincapie p/b BMC

Justin Oien (born May 5, 1995) is an American cyclist, currently riding for UCI Continental team Hincapie–Leomo p/b BMC.

== Major results ==
2012
4th Overall Tour de l'Abitibi
2013
8th Overall Tour de l'Abitibi
10th Paris–Roubaix Juniors
2014
8th ZLM Tour
2016
1st Stage 1 (TTT) Olympia's Tour
6th Paris–Roubaix Espoirs
2017
1st Stage 4 Rhône-Alpes Isère Tour
4th Grote Prijs Marcel Kint
2018
9th Clássica da Arrábida
