= 2016 Tour of Utah =

2016 UCI America Tour

Race details
- Dates: August 1-7, 2016
- Stages: 7
- Distance: 1,131 km (702.8 mi)
- Winning time: 27h 12' 49"

Results
Jersey awarded to the overall winner	Winner	Lachlan Morton (AUS)	(Jelly Belly–Maxxis)
	Second	Adrien Costa (USA)	(Axeon–Hagens Berman)
	Third	Andrew Talansky (USA)	(Cannondale–Drapac)
Jersey awarded to the mountains classification winner	Mountains	Adrien Costa (USA)	(Axeon–Hagens Berman)
Jersey awarded to the youth classification winner	Youth	Adrien Costa (USA)	(Axeon–Hagens Berman)
Jersey awarded to the sprints classification winner	Sprints	Kiel Reijnen (USA)	(Trek–Segafredo)
	Team	BMC Racing Team	

The 2016 Larry H. Miller Tour of Utah was the 13th edition of the Tour of Utah. It started on August 1 in Logan and finished on August 7 in Park City. It was rated as a 2.HC event on the UCI America Tour. The race was won by Lachlan Morton of Jelly Belly–Maxxis.

== Teams ==
The sixteen teams invited to participate in the Tour of Utah are:

World Tour teams

- BMC Racing Team
- IAM Cycling
- Trek–Segafredo
- Cannondale–Drapac

Professional Continental teams

- Fortuneo–Vital Concept
- Nippo–Vini Fantini
- Team Novo Nordisk
- ONE Pro Cycling
- UnitedHealthcare

Continental teams

- Axeon–Hagens Berman
- Holowesko Citadel Racing Team
- Team Jamis
- Jelly Belly–Maxxis
- Lupus Racing Team
- Rally Cycling
- Silber Pro Cycling Team

== Route ==
Stage characteristics and winners
Stage	Date	Course	Distance	Type	Stage winner
1	August 1	Zion National Park to Cedar City	135 km (84 mi)	Hilly stage	Kris Dahl (CAN)
2	August 2	Escalante to Torrey	159 km (99 mi)	Hilly stage	Robin Carpenter (USA)
3	August 3	Richfield to Payson	191 km (119 mi)	Medium mountain stage	Lachlan Morton (AUS)
4	August 4	Lehi to Kearns	154 km (96 mi)	Hilly stage	Travis McCabe (USA)
5	August 5	Antelope Island State Park to Bountiful	183 km (114 mi)	Medium mountain stage	Kiel Reijnen (USA)
6	August 6	Snowbasin to Snowbird	184 km (114 mi)	Mountain stage	Andrew Talansky (USA)
7	August 7	Park City to Park City	125 km (78 mi)	Medium mountain stage	Lachlan Morton (AUS)

== Stages ==
=== Stage 1 ===
Stage 1 result

Rank	Rider	Team	Time
1	Kris Dahl (CAN)	Silber Pro Cycling Team	3h 07' 19"
2	Colin Joyce (USA)	Axeon–Hagens Berman	s.t.
3	Rick Zabel (GER)	BMC Racing Team	s.t.
4	Travis McCabe (USA)	Holowesko Citadel Racing Team	s.t.
5	Logan Owen (USA)	Axeon–Hagens Berman	s.t.
6	Ulises Alfredo Castillo (MEX)	Jelly Belly–Maxxis	s.t.
7	David Tanner (AUS)	IAM Cycling	s.t.
8	Kévin Ledanois (FRA)	Fortuneo–Vital Concept	s.t.
9	Pierrick Naud (CAN)	Rally Cycling	s.t.
10	Tanner Putt (USA)	UnitedHealthcare	s.t.

General classification after Stage 1

Rank	Rider	Team	Time
1	Kris Dahl (CAN)	Silber Pro Cycling Team	3h 07' 09"
2	Colin Joyce (USA)	Axeon–Hagens Berman	+ 4"
3	Rick Zabel (GER)	BMC Racing Team	+ 6"
4	Simon Pellaud (SUI)	IAM Cycling	+ 7"
5	Matteo Dal-Cin (CAN)	Silber Pro Cycling Team	+ 8"
6	Travis McCabe (USA)	Holowesko Citadel Racing Team	+ 10"
7	Logan Owen (USA)	Axeon–Hagens Berman	s.t.
8	Ulises Alfredo Castillo (MEX)	Jelly Belly–Maxxis	s.t.
9	David Tanner (AUS)	IAM Cycling	s.t.
10	Kévin Ledanois (FRA)	Fortuneo–Vital Concept	s.t.

=== Stage 2 ===
Stage 2 result

Rank	Rider	Team	Time
1	Robin Carpenter (USA)	Holowesko Citadel Racing Team	3h 56' 48"
2	Rubén Companioni (CUB)	Team Jamis	+ 6"
3	Travis McCabe (USA)	Holowesko Citadel Racing Team	+ 2' 07"
4	Kiel Reijnen (USA)	Trek–Segafredo	s.t.
5	David Tanner (AUS)	IAM Cycling	s.t.
6	Rick Zabel (GER)	BMC Racing Team	s.t.
7	Marco Canola (ITA)	UnitedHealthcare	s.t.
8	Logan Owen (USA)	Axeon–Hagens Berman	s.t.
9	Colin Joyce (USA)	Axeon–Hagens Berman	s.t.
10	Iuri Filosi (ITA)	Nippo–Vini Fantini	s.t.

General classification after Stage 2

Rank	Rider	Team	Time
1	Robin Carpenter (USA)	Holowesko Citadel Racing Team	7h 03' 51"
2	Rubén Companioni (CUB)	Team Jamis	+ 12"
3	Kris Dahl (CAN)	Silber Pro Cycling Team	+ 2' 12"
4	Colin Joyce (USA)	Axeon–Hagens Berman	+ 2' 17"
5	Travis McCabe (USA)	Holowesko Citadel Racing Team	+ 2' 19"
6	Rick Zabel (GER)	BMC Racing Team	s.t.
7	Simon Pellaud (SUI)	IAM Cycling	+ 2' 20"
8	Evan Huffman (USA)	Rally Cycling	+ 2' 22"
9	David Tanner (AUS)	IAM Cycling	+ 2' 23"
10	Logan Owen (USA)	Axeon–Hagens Berman	s.t.

=== Stage 3 ===
Stage 3 result

Rank	Rider	Team	Time
1	Lachlan Morton (AUS)	Jelly Belly–Maxxis	4h 24' 49"
2	Adrien Costa (USA)	Axeon–Hagens Berman	+ 3"
3	Andrew Talansky (USA)	Cannondale–Drapac	s.t.
4	Joey Rosskopf (USA)	BMC Racing Team	+ 1' 22"
5	Rob Britton (CAN)	Rally Cycling	s.t.
6	Darwin Atapuma (COL)	BMC Racing Team	s.t.
7	Taylor Eisenhart (USA)	BMC Racing Team	+ 1' 24"
8	Kiel Reijnen (USA)	Trek–Segafredo	+ 3' 57"
9	Robin Carpenter (USA)	Holowesko Citadel Racing Team	s.t.
10	Jonathan Clarke (AUS)	UnitedHealthcare	s.t.

General classification after Stage 3

Rank	Rider	Team	Time
1	Lachlan Morton (AUS)	Jelly Belly–Maxxis	11h 30' 53"
2	Adrien Costa (USA)	Axeon–Hagens Berman	+ 7"
3	Andrew Talansky (USA)	Cannondale–Drapac	+ 9"
4	Darwin Atapuma (COL)	BMC Racing Team	+ 1' 32"
5	Joey Rosskopf (USA)	BMC Racing Team	s.t.
6	Rob Britton (CAN)	Rally Cycling	s.t.
7	Taylor Eisenhart (USA)	BMC Racing Team	+ 1' 34"
8	Robin Carpenter (USA)	Holowesko Citadel Racing Team	+ 1' 44"
9	Neilson Powless (USA)	Axeon–Hagens Berman	+ 4' 07"
10	Tao Geoghegan Hart (GBR)	Axeon–Hagens Berman	s.t.

=== Stage 4 ===
Stage 4 result

Rank	Rider	Team	Time
1	Travis McCabe (USA)	Holowesko Citadel Racing Team	3h 23' 47"
2	Kiel Reijnen (USA)	Trek–Segafredo	s.t.
3	Lucas Sebastián Haedo (ARG)	Team Jamis	s.t.
4	Marco Canola (ITA)	UnitedHealthcare	s.t.
5	Eric Young (USA)	Rally Cycling	s.t.
6	Colin Joyce (USA)	Axeon–Hagens Berman	s.t.
7	Daniel Jaramillo (COL)	UnitedHealthcare	s.t.
8	Jacob Rathe (USA)	Jelly Belly–Maxxis	s.t.
9	Rick Zabel (GER)	BMC Racing Team	s.t.
10	Jonathan Dibben (GBR)	WIGGINS	s.t.

General classification after Stage 4

Rank	Rider	Team	Time
1	Lachlan Morton (AUS)	Jelly Belly–Maxxis	14h 54' 40"
2	Adrien Costa (USA)	Axeon–Hagens Berman	+ 7"
3	Andrew Talansky (USA)	Cannondale–Drapac	+ 9"
4	Darwin Atapuma (COL)	BMC Racing Team	+ 1' 32"
5	Joey Rosskopf (USA)	BMC Racing Team	s.t.
6	Rob Britton (CAN)	Rally Cycling	s.t.
7	Taylor Eisenhart (USA)	BMC Racing Team	+ 1' 34"
8	Robin Carpenter (USA)	Holowesko Citadel Racing Team	+ 1' 44"
9	Kiel Reijnen (USA)	Trek–Segafredo	+ 4' 01"
10	Neilson Powless (USA)	Axeon–Hagens Berman	+ 4' 07"

=== Stage 5 ===
Stage 5 result

Rank	Rider	Team	Time
1	Kiel Reijnen (USA)	Trek–Segafredo	4h 22' 38"
2	Tao Geoghegan Hart (GBR)	Axeon–Hagens Berman	s.t.
3	Alex Howes (USA)	Cannondale–Drapac	s.t.
4	Andrew Talansky (USA)	Cannondale–Drapac	s.t.
5	Daniel Jaramillo (COL)	UnitedHealthcare	s.t.
6	Joey Rosskopf (USA)	BMC Racing Team	s.t.
7	Dylan Teuns (BEL)	BMC Racing Team	s.t.
8	Javier Mejías (ESP)	Team Novo Nordisk	s.t.
9	Rob Britton (CAN)	Rally Cycling	s.t.
10	Damiano Cunego (ITA)	Nippo–Vini Fantini	s.t.

General classification after Stage 5

Rank	Rider	Team	Time
1	Lachlan Morton (AUS)	Jelly Belly–Maxxis	19h 17' 18"
2	Andrew Talansky (USA)	Cannondale–Drapac	+ 9"
3	Adrien Costa (USA)	Axeon–Hagens Berman	+ 34"
4	Joey Rosskopf (USA)	BMC Racing Team	+ 1' 32"
5	Darwin Atapuma (COL)	BMC Racing Team	s.t.
6	Rob Britton (CAN)	Rally Cycling	s.t.
7	Taylor Eisenhart (USA)	BMC Racing Team	+ 1' 34"
8	Robin Carpenter (USA)	Holowesko Citadel Racing Team	+ 2' 11"
9	Kiel Reijnen (USA)	Trek–Segafredo	+ 3' 51"
10	Tao Geoghegan Hart (USA)	Axeon–Hagens Berman	+ 4' 01"

=== Stage 6 ===
Stage 6 result

Rank	Rider	Team	Time
1	Andrew Talansky (USA)	Cannondale–Drapac	4h 47' 03"
2	Darwin Atapuma (COL)	BMC Racing Team	s.t.
3	Adrien Costa (USA)	Axeon–Hagens Berman	+ 31"
4	Lachlan Morton (AUS)	Jelly Belly–Maxxis	s.t.
5	Rob Britton (CAN)	Rally Cycling	+ 46"
6	Robbie Squire (USA)	Holowesko Citadel Racing Team	+ 1' 01"
7	Joey Rosskopf (USA)	BMC Racing Team	+ 1' 12"
8	Riccardo Zoidl (AUT)	Trek–Segafredo	+ 1' 22"
9	Laurent Didier (LUX)	Trek–Segafredo	+ 1' 37"
10	Taylor Eisenhart (USA)	BMC Racing Team	s.t.

General classification after Stage 6

Rank	Rider	Team	Time
1	Andrew Talansky (USA)	Cannondale–Drapac	24h 04' 30"
2	Lachlan Morton (AUS)	Jelly Belly–Maxxis	+ 22"
3	Adrien Costa (USA)	Axeon–Hagens Berman	+ 56"
4	Darwin Atapuma (COL)	BMC Racing Team	+ 1' 23"
5	Rob Britton (CAN)	Rally Cycling	+ 2' 09"
6	Joey Rosskopf (USA)	BMC Racing Team	+ 2' 35"
7	Taylor Eisenhart (USA)	BMC Racing Team	+ 3' 02"
8	Robbie Squire (USA)	Holowesko Citadel Racing Team	+ 4' 59"
9	Joe Dombrowski (USA)	Cannondale–Drapac	+ 5' 35"
10	Laurent Didier (LUX)	Trek–Segafredo	s.t.

=== Stage 7 ===
Stage 7 result

Rank	Rider	Team	Time
1	Lachlan Morton (AUS)	Jelly Belly–Maxxis	3h 08' 07"
2	Adrien Costa (USA)	Axeon–Hagens Berman	+ 31"
3	Darwin Atapuma (COL)	BMC Racing Team	+ 50"
4	Andrew Talansky (USA)	Cannondale–Drapac	+ 1' 51"
5	Joe Dombrowski (USA)	Cannondale–Drapac	+ 1' 53"
6	Rob Britton (CAN)	Rally Cycling	+ 2' 03"
7	Manuel Senni (ITA)	BMC Racing Team	+ 2' 35"
8	Laurent Didier (LUX)	Trek–Segafredo	+ 3' 15"
9	Joey Rosskopf (USA)	BMC Racing Team	+ 3' 36"
10	Alberto Bettiol (ITA)	Cannondale–Drapac	+ 3' 49"

== Classifications ==
Final general classification

Rank	Rider	Team	Time
1	Lachlan Morton (AUS)	Jelly Belly–Maxxis	27h 12' 49"
2	Adrien Costa (USA)	Axeon–Hagens Berman	+ 1' 09"
3	Andrew Talansky (USA)	Cannondale–Drapac	+ 1' 39"
4	Darwin Atapuma (COL)	BMC Racing Team	+ 1' 57"
5	Rob Britton (CAN)	Rally Cycling	+ 4' 00"
6	Joey Rosskopf (USA)	BMC Racing Team	+ 5' 59"
7	Taylor Eisenhart (USA)	BMC Racing Team	+ 6' 52"
8	Joe Dombrowski (USA)	Cannondale–Drapac	+ 7' 16"
9	Robbie Squire (USA)	Holowesko Citadel Racing Team	+ 8' 38"
10	Laurent Didier (LUX)	Trek–Segafredo	s.t.
