= 2015 USA Pro Cycling Challenge =

2015 UCI America Tour

Race details
- Dates: August 17–23, 2015
- Stages: 7

Results
| Jersey awarded to the overall winner | Winner | Rohan Dennis (AUS) | (BMC Racing Team) |
| | Second | Brent Bookwalter (USA) | (BMC Racing Team) |
| | Third | Rob Britton (CAN) | (Team SmartStop) |

The 2015 USA Pro Cycling Challenge was the fifth edition of the USA Pro Cycling Challenge stage race. Once again, the race was included on the UCI America Tour, with a UCI classification of 2.HC. The race took place between August 17–23, 2015 as a seven-day, seven-stage race, traversing the state of Colorado. The race was won by Rohan Dennis of BMC Racing Team.

== Participating teams ==
In August, the USA Pro Cycling Challenge announced a sixteen-team field, made up of four UCI WorldTeams, four UCI Professional Continental Teams and eight UCI Continental Teams, thus giving the race a total of sixteen-teams (the same as in 2014).

UCI WorldTeams

- Cannondale–Garmin
- BMC Racing Team
- Trek Factory Racing
- Tinkoff–Saxo

UCI Professional Continental Teams

- Caja Rural–Seguros RGA
- Drapac Professional Cycling
- Team Novo Nordisk
- UnitedHealthcare

UCI Continental Teams

- Axeon Cycling Team
- Team Budget Forklifts
- Cycling Academy Team
- Hincapie Racing
- Jamis–Hagens Berman
- Jelly Belly–Maxxis
- Optum–Kelly Benefit Strategies
- Team SmartStop

== Stages ==
Stage results
| Stage | Date | Route | Terrain | Length | Winner |
|---|---|---|---|---|---|
| 1 | 17 August | Steamboat Springs Circuit | Hilly stage | 156 km (97 mi) | Taylor Phinney (USA) |
| 2 | 18 August | Steamboat Springs – Arapahoe Basin | Medium-mountain stage | 186 km (116 mi) | Brent Bookwalter (USA) |
| 3 | 19 August | Copper Mountain Resort – Aspen | Medium-mountain stage | 163 km (101 mi) | Kiel Reijnen (USA) |
| 4 | 20 August | Aspen – Breckenridge | Mountain stage | 203 km (126 mi) | Rohan Dennis (AUS) |
| 5 | 21 August | Breckenridge | Individual time trial | 14 km (8.7 mi) | Rohan Dennis (AUS) |
| 6 | 22 August | Loveland – Fort Collins | Medium-mountain stage | 165 km (103 mi) | Roman Kreuziger (CZE) |
| 7 | 23 August | Golden – Denver | Medium-mountain stage | 110 km (68 mi) | John Murphy (USA) |
| | Total | | 845 km (525 mi) | | |

== Classification leadership ==
In the USA Pro Cycling Challenge, five jerseys are awarded. For the general classification, calculated by adding the finishing times of the stages per cyclist, the leader receives a yellow jersey. This classification is considered the most important of the USA Pro Cycling Challenge, and the winner of the general classification will be considered the winner of the event.

Additionally, there is also a sprints classification, akin to what is called the points classification in other races, which awards a green jersey. Points are gathered at sprint line performances as well as finishing the stage in the top-fifteen places.

There is also a mountains classification, which awards a red jersey. In the mountains classifications, points are won by reaching the top of a mountain before other cyclists. Each climb is categorized, either first, second, third, or fourth category, with more points available for the harder climbs.

There is also a youth classification. This classification is calculated the same way as the general classification, but only young cyclists (under 23) are included. The leader of the young rider classification receives a blue jersey.

The last jersey is awarded to the most aggressive rider of a stage for him to wear on the next stage. It is generally awarded to a rider who attacks constantly or spends a lot of time in the breakaways. This jersey is orange.

There is also a classification for teams. In this classification, the times of the best three cyclists per stage are added, and the team with the lowest time is the leader.

| Stage | Winner | General classification | Sprints classification | Mountains classification | Young rider classification | Most Aggressive | Best Colorado Rider | Team classification |
|---|---|---|---|---|---|---|---|---|
| 1 | Taylor Phinney | Taylor Phinney | Taylor Phinney | Jonathan Clarke | Logan Owen | Guillaume Boivin | Taylor Phinney | BMC Racing Team |
| 2 | Brent Bookwalter | Brent Bookwalter | Taylor Phinney | Will Routley | Hugh Carthy | Nate Brown | Alexandr Braico | BMC Racing Team |
| 3 | Kiel Reijnen | Brent Bookwalter | Kiel Reijnen | Will Routley | Hugh Carthy | Laurent Didier | Alexandr Braico | BMC Racing Team |
| 4 | Rohan Dennis | Rohan Dennis | Rohan Dennis | Rohan Dennis | Hugh Carthy | Robbie Squire | Alexandr Braico | BMC Racing Team |
| 5 | Rohan Dennis | Rohan Dennis | Rohan Dennis | Rohan Dennis | Tao Geoghegan Hart | Robbie Squire | Alexandr Braico | BMC Racing Team |
| 6 | Roman Kreuziger | Rohan Dennis | Kiel Reijnen | Rohan Dennis | Tao Geoghegan Hart | Roman Kreuziger | Alexandr Braico | BMC Racing Team |
| 7 | John Murphy | Rohan Dennis | Kiel Reijnen | Rohan Dennis | Tao Geoghegan Hart | Javier Mejías | Alexandr Braico | BMC Racing Team |
| Final | | Rohan Dennis | Kiel Reijnen | Rohan Dennis | Tao Geoghegan Hart | Javier Mejías | Alexandr Braico | BMC Racing Team |
