= 2014 Tour of Utah =

2013–14 UCI America Tour

Race details
- Dates: August 4–10, 2014
- Stages: 7
- Distance: 753.8 miles (1,213 km)

Results
Jersey awarded to the overall winner	Winner	Tom Danielson (USA)	(Garmin–Sharp)
	Second	Chris Horner (USA)	(Lampre–Merida)
	Third	Winner Anacona (COL)	(Lampre–Merida)
Jersey awarded to the mountains classification winner	Mountains	Joey Rosskopf (USA)	(Hincapie Sportswear Development Team)
Jersey awarded to the youth classification winner	Youth	Dylan Teuns (BEL)	(BMC Racing Team)
Jersey awarded to the sprints classification winner	Sprints	Jure Kocjan (SLO)	(Team SmartStop)
	Team	Lampre–Merida	

The 2014 Larry H. Miller Tour of Utah was the eleventh edition of the Tour of Utah, a seven-stage professional cycling race which took place from August 4–10, 2014. It covered 753.8 miles (1,213.1 kilometres), and 57,863 feet (17,637 metres) of total climbing. 16 men's professional cycling teams competed in the 2014 edition, with 6 of these teams also being featured in the 2014 Tour de France, with riders representing 24 different countries. For the second year in succession, the race was won by Tom Danielson of the Garmin–Sharp squad.

== Teams ==
Sixteen teams competed in the 2014 Tour of Utah. These included six UCI ProTeams, three UCI Professional Continental and seven UCI Continental teams.

The teams that participated in the race were:

- Belkin Pro Cycling
- Bissell Development Team
- BMC Racing Team
- Cannondale
- Drapac Professional Cycling
- Funvic Brasilinvest–São José dos Campos
- Garmin–Sharp
- Hincapie Sportswear Development Team
- Jamis–Hagens Berman
- Jelly Belly–Maxxis
- Lampre–Merida
- Team Novo Nordisk
- Optum–Kelly Benefit Strategies
- Team SmartStop
- Trek Factory Racing
- UnitedHealthcare

== Route ==
Stage characteristics and winners
Stage	Date	Course	Distance	Type	Winner
1	August 4	Cedar City to Cedar City	113.5 mi (183 km)	Hilly stage	Moreno Hofland (NED)
2	August 5	Panguitch to Torrey	130.7 mi (210 km)	Medium-mountain stage	Michael Schär (SUI)
3	August 6	Lehi to Miller Motorsports Park	118.3 mi (190 km)	Flat stage	Moreno Hofland (NED)
4	August 7	Ogden to Powder Mountain	104.7 mi (168 km)	Mountain stage	Tom Danielson (USA)
5	August 8	Evanston to Kamas	101.4 mi (163 km)	Medium-mountain stage	Eric Young (USA)
6	August 9	Salt Lake City to Snowbird	107.2 mi (173 km)	Mountain stage	Cadel Evans (AUS)
7	August 10	Park City to Park City	78 mi (126 km)	Mountain stage	Cadel Evans (AUS)

== Stages ==
=== Stage 1 ===
August 4, 2014 — Cedar City to Cedar City, 113.5 mi (183 km)

The first of the seven stages took place in Cedar City, and was won by Moreno Hofland of the Belkin Pro Cycling team.

Stage 1 result
Rank	Rider	Team	Time
1	Moreno Hofland (NED)	Belkin Pro Cycling	4h 51' 12"
2	Jure Kocjan (SLO)	Team SmartStop	+ 0"
3	Andrea Palini (ITA)	Lampre–Merida	+ 0"
4	Eric Young (USA)	Optum–Kelly Benefit Strategies	+ 0"
5	Kiel Reijnen (USA)	UnitedHealthcare	+ 0"
6	Danilo Wyss (SUI)	BMC Racing Team	+ 0"
7	Rick Zabel (DEU)	BMC Racing Team	+ 0"
8	Tanner Putt (USA)	Bissell Development Team	+ 0"
9	Alex Howes (USA)	Garmin–Sharp	+ 0"
10	Serghei Țvetcov (ROU)	Jelly Belly–Maxxis	+ 0"

General classification after stage 1
Rank	Rider	Team	Time
1	Moreno Hofland (NED)	Belkin Pro Cycling	4h 51' 02"
2	Jure Kocjan (SLO)	Team SmartStop	+ 4"
3	Andrea Palini (ITA)	Lampre–Merida	+ 6"
4	Eric Young (USA)	Optum–Kelly Benefit Strategies	+ 10"
5	Kiel Reijnen (USA)	UnitedHealthcare	+ 10"
6	Danilo Wyss (SUI)	BMC Racing Team	+ 10"
7	Rick Zabel (DEU)	BMC Racing Team	+ 10"
8	Tanner Putt (USA)	Bissell Development Team	+ 10"
9	Alex Howes (USA)	Garmin–Sharp	+ 10"
10	Serghei Țvetcov (ROU)	Jelly Belly–Maxxis	+ 10"

=== Stage 2 ===
August 5, 2014 — Panguitch, to Torrey, 130.7 mi (210 km)

Stage 2 from Panguitch to Torrey was won by Michael Schär of the BMC Racing Team.

Stage 2 result
Rank	Rider	Team	Time
1	Michael Schär (SUI)	BMC Racing Team	5h 03' 00"
2	Jure Kocjan (SLO)	Team SmartStop	+ 2"
3	Serghei Țvetcov (ROU)	Jelly Belly–Maxxis	+ 2"
4	Kiel Reijnen (USA)	UnitedHealthcare	+ 2"
5	Toms Skujiņš (LAT)	Hincapie Sportswear Development Team	+ 2"
6	Cadel Evans (AUS)	BMC Racing Team	+ 2"
7	Tanner Putt (USA)	Bissell Development Team	+ 2"
8	Luca Wackermann (ITA)	Lampre–Merida	+ 2"
9	Wilco Kelderman (NED)	Belkin Pro Cycling	+ 2"
10	Brent Bookwalter (USA)	BMC Racing Team	+ 2"

General classification after stage 2
Rank	Rider	Team	Time
1	Jure Kocjan (SLO)	Team SmartStop	9h 54' 02"
2	Michael Schär (SUI)	BMC Racing Team	+ 2"
3	Serghei Țvetcov (ROU)	Jelly Belly–Maxxis	+ 8"
4	Kiel Reijnen (USA)	UnitedHealthcare	+ 12"
5	Tanner Putt (USA)	Bissell Development Team	+ 12"
6	Cadel Evans (AUS)	BMC Racing Team	+ 12"
7	Luca Wackermann (ITA)	Lampre–Merida	+ 12"
8	Alex Howes (USA)	Garmin–Sharp	+ 12"
9	Robin Carpenter (USA)	Hincapie Sportswear Development Team	+ 14"
10	Carter Jones (USA)	Optum–Kelly Benefit Strategies	+ 17"

=== Stage 3 ===
August 6, 2014 — Lehi to Miller Motorsports Park, 118.3 mi (190 km)

In Stage 3, from Lehi to Miller Motorsports Park, Moreno Hofland of the Belkin Pro Cycling team won his second stage beating out Andrea Palini of the Lampre–Merida team in a sprint finish.

Stage 3 result
Rank	Rider	Team	Time
1	Moreno Hofland (NED)	Belkin Pro Cycling	4h 29' 41"
2	Andrea Palini (ITA)	Lampre–Merida	+ 0"
3	Eric Young (USA)	Optum–Kelly Benefit Strategies	+ 0"
4	Ken Hanson (USA)	UnitedHealthcare	+ 0"
5	Wilco Kelderman (NED)	Belkin Pro Cycling	+ 0"
6	Jure Kocjan (SLO)	Team SmartStop	+ 0"
7	Rick Zabel (DEU)	BMC Racing Team	+ 0"
8	Kiel Reijnen (USA)	UnitedHealthcare	+ 0"
9	Alan Marangoni (ITA)	Cannondale	+ 0"
10	Gavin Mannion (USA)	Garmin–Sharp	+ 0"

General classification after stage 3
Rank	Rider	Team	Time
1	Jure Kocjan (SLO)	Team SmartStop	14h 23' 43"
2	Michael Schär (SUI)	BMC Racing Team	+ 2"
3	Serghei Țvetcov (ROU)	Jelly Belly–Maxxis	+ 8"
4	Robin Carpenter (USA)	Hincapie Sportswear Development Team	+ 11"
5	Kiel Reijnen (USA)	UnitedHealthcare	+ 12"
6	Cadel Evans (AUS)	BMC Racing Team	+ 12"
7	Luca Wackermann (ITA)	Lampre–Merida	+ 12"
8	Tanner Putt (USA)	Bissell Development Team	+ 12"
9	Alex Howes (USA)	Garmin–Sharp	+ 12"
10	Wilco Kelderman (NED)	Belkin Pro Cycling	+ 17"

=== Stage 4 ===
August 7, 2014 — Ogden to Powder Mountain, 104.7 mi (168 km)

Stage 4, going from Ogden to Powder Mountain, was won by Tom Danielson, of the Garmin–Sharp team.

Stage 4 result
Rank	Rider	Team	Time
1	Tom Danielson (USA)	Garmin–Sharp	4h 18' 53"
2	Ben Hermans (BEL)	BMC Racing Team	+ 57"
3	Chris Horner (USA)	Lampre–Merida	+ 57"
4	Winner Anacona (COL)	Lampre–Merida	+ 1' 47"
5	Alex Diniz (BRA)	Funvic Brasilinvest–São José dos Campos	+ 2' 07"
6	Wilco Kelderman (NED)	Belkin Pro Cycling	+ 2' 07"
7	George Bennett (NZL)	Cannondale	+ 2' 26"
8	Carter Jones (USA)	Optum–Kelly Benefit Strategies	+ 2' 31"
9	Cadel Evans (AUS)	BMC Racing Team	+ 2' 48"
10	Lachlan Norris (AUS)	Drapac Professional Cycling	+ 2' 51"

General classification after stage 4
Rank	Rider	Team	Time
1	Tom Danielson (USA)	Garmin–Sharp	18h 42' 53"
2	Chris Horner (USA)	Lampre–Merida	+ 57"
3	Ben Hermans (BEL)	BMC Racing Team	+ 57"
4	Winner Anacona (COL)	Lampre–Merida	+ 1' 47"
5	Wilco Kelderman (NED)	Belkin Pro Cycling	+ 2' 07"
6	Alex Diniz (BRA)	Funvic Brasilinvest–São José dos Campos	+ 2' 07"
7	George Bennett (NZL)	Cannondale	+ 2' 26"
8	Carter Jones (USA)	Optum–Kelly Benefit Strategies	+ 2' 31"
9	Cadel Evans (AUS)	BMC Racing Team	+ 2' 43"
10	Lachlan Norris (AUS)	Drapac Professional Cycling	+ 2' 51"

=== Stage 5 ===
August 8, 2014 — Evanston to Kamas, 101.4 mi (163 km)

Stage 5 began in Evanston, Wyoming and finished in Kamas, and was won by Eric Young of the Optum–Kelly Benefit Strategies team.

Stage 5 result
Rank	Rider	Team	Time
1	Eric Young (USA)	Optum–Kelly Benefit Strategies	3h 49' 29"
2	Jure Kocjan (SLO)	Team SmartStop	+ 0"
3	Kiel Reijnen (USA)	UnitedHealthcare	+ 0"
4	Robert Wagner (DEU)	Belkin Pro Cycling	+ 0"
5	Rick Zabel (DEU)	BMC Racing Team	+ 0"
6	Ben Hermans (BEL)	BMC Racing Team	+ 0"
7	Dion Smith (NZL)	Hincapie Sportswear Development Team	+ 0"
8	Alex Kirsch (LUX)	Trek Factory Racing	+ 0"
9	Serghei Țvetcov (ROU)	Jelly Belly–Maxxis	+ 0"
10	Alan Marangoni (ITA)	Cannondale	+ 0"

General classification after stage 5
Rank	Rider	Team	Time
1	Tom Danielson (USA)	Garmin–Sharp	22h 32' 22"
2	Chris Horner (USA)	Lampre–Merida	+ 57"
3	Ben Hermans (BEL)	BMC Racing Team	+ 57"
4	Winner Anacona (COL)	Lampre–Merida	+ 1' 47"
5	Wilco Kelderman (NED)	Belkin Pro Cycling	+ 2' 07"
6	Alex Diniz (BRA)	Funvic Brasilinvest–São José dos Campos	+ 2' 07"
7	George Bennett (NZL)	Cannondale	+ 2' 26"
8	Carter Jones (USA)	Optum–Kelly Benefit Strategies	+ 2' 31"
9	Cadel Evans (AUS)	BMC Racing Team	+ 2' 43"
10	Lachlan Norris (AUS)	Drapac Professional Cycling	+ 2' 51"

=== Stage 6 ===
August 9, 2014 — Salt Lake City to Snowbird Ski and Summer Resort, 107.2 mi (173 km)

The sixth stage, from Salt Lake City to Snowbird Ski and Summer Resort, was won by former Tour de France winner Cadel Evans, of the BMC Racing Team.

Stage 6 result
Rank	Rider	Team	Time
1	Cadel Evans (AUS)	BMC Racing Team	4h 34' 31"
2	Joey Rosskopf (USA)	Hincapie Sportswear Development Team	+ 3"
3	Riccardo Zoidl (AUT)	Trek Factory Racing	+ 7"
4	Wilco Kelderman (NED)	Belkin Pro Cycling	+ 7"
5	Chris Horner (USA)	Lampre–Merida	+ 14"
6	Tom Danielson (USA)	Garmin–Sharp	+ 14"
7	Winner Anacona (COL)	Lampre–Merida	+ 19"
8	Lucas Euser (USA)	UnitedHealthcare	+ 35"
9	Carter Jones (USA)	Optum–Kelly Benefit Strategies	+ 35"
10	Ben Hermans (BEL)	BMC Racing Team	+ 43"

General classification after stage 6
Rank	Rider	Team	Time
1	Tom Danielson (USA)	Garmin–Sharp	27h 07' 07"
2	Chris Horner (USA)	Lampre–Merida	+ 57"
3	Ben Hermans (BEL)	BMC Racing Team	+ 1' 26"
4	Winner Anacona (COL)	Lampre–Merida	+ 1' 52"
5	Wilco Kelderman (NED)	Belkin Pro Cycling	+ 2' 00"
6	Cadel Evans (AUS)	BMC Racing Team	+ 2' 29"
7	Carter Jones (USA)	Optum–Kelly Benefit Strategies	+ 2' 52"
8	Alex Diniz (BRA)	Funvic Brasilinvest–São José dos Campos	+ 3' 28"
9	George Bennett (NZL)	Cannondale	+ 3' 40"
10	Matthew Busche (USA)	Trek Factory Racing	+ 4' 10"

=== Stage 7 ===
August 10, 2014 — Park City to Park City, 78 mi (126 km)

The seventh and final stage of the Tour took place in Park City, and Cadel Evans recorded his second stage win in consecutive days.

Stage 7 result
Rank	Rider	Team	Time
1	Cadel Evans (AUS)	BMC Racing Team	3h 10' 52"
2	Wilco Kelderman (NED)	Belkin Pro Cycling	+ 0"
3	Winner Anacona (COL)	Lampre–Merida	+ 0"
4	Chris Horner (USA)	Lampre–Merida	+ 0"
5	Tom Danielson (USA)	Garmin–Sharp	+ 5"
6	Carter Jones (USA)	Optum–Kelly Benefit Strategies	+ 10"
7	Ben Hermans (BEL)	BMC Racing Team	+ 25"
8	George Bennett (NZL)	Cannondale	+ 25"
9	Lachlan Norris (AUS)	Drapac Professional Cycling	+ 25"
10	Yannick Eijssen (BEL)	BMC Racing Team	+ 25"

Final general classification
Rank	Rider	Team	Time
1	Tom Danielson (USA)	Garmin–Sharp	30h 18' 04"
2	Chris Horner (USA)	Lampre–Merida	+ 52"
3	Winner Anacona (COL)	Lampre–Merida	+ 1' 43"
4	Ben Hermans (BEL)	BMC Racing Team	+ 1' 46"
5	Wilco Kelderman (NED)	Belkin Pro Cycling	+ 1' 49"
6	Cadel Evans (AUS)	BMC Racing Team	+ 2' 14"
7	Carter Jones (USA)	Optum–Kelly Benefit Strategies	+ 2' 57"
8	Alex Diniz (BRA)	Funvic Brasilinvest–São José dos Campos	+ 3' 48"
9	George Bennett (NZL)	Cannondale	+ 4' 00"
10	Lachlan Norris (AUS)	Drapac Professional Cycling	+ 4' 59"
