= 2014 USA Pro Cycling Challenge =

2013–14 UCI America Tour

Race details
- Dates: August 18–24, 2014
- Stages: 7
- Distance: 845.1 km (525.1 mi)
- Winning time: 20h 05' 42"

Results
Jersey awarded to the overall winner	Winner	Tejay van Garderen (USA)	(BMC Racing Team)
	Second	Tom Danielson (USA)	(Garmin–Sharp)
	Third	Serghei Țvetcov (ROU)	(Jelly Belly–Maxxis)
Jersey awarded to the mountains classification winner	Mountains	Ben Jacques-Maynes (USA)	(Jamis–Hagens Berman)
Jersey awarded to the youth classification winner	Youth	Clément Chevrier (FRA)	(Bissell Development Team)
Jersey awarded to the sprints classification winner	Sprints	Kiel Reijnen (USA)	(UnitedHealthcare)
	Team	BMC Racing Team	

The 2014 USA Pro Cycling Challenge was the fourth edition of the USA Pro Cycling Challenge stage race. Once again, the race was included on the UCI America Tour, with a UCI classification of 2.HC. As such, the race was only open to teams on the UCI ProTour, UCI Professional Continental and UCI Continental circuits. The race took place between August 18–24, 2014 as a seven-day, seven-stage race, traversing the state of Colorado. The 2014 USA Pro Cycling Challenge was one of six UCI-ranked stage races in the United States in 2014, and one of two (along with the 2014 Tour of California) that attracted multiple UCI ProTeams to compete.

== Participating teams ==
In July, the USA Pro Cycling Challenge announced a sixteen-team field, made up of five UCI ProTeams, four UCI Professional Continental Teams and seven UCI Continental Teams, thus giving the race a total of sixteen-teams (the same as in 2013).

UCI ProTeams

- BMC Racing Team
- Cannondale
- Garmin–Sharp
- Trek Factory Racing
- Tinkoff–Saxo

UCI Professional Continental Teams

- Drapac Professional Cycling
- NetApp–Endura
- Team Novo Nordisk
- UnitedHealthcare

UCI Continental Teams

- Bissell Development Team
- Hincapie Sportswear Development Team
- Jamis–Hagens Berman
- Jelly Belly–Maxxis
- Optum–Kelly Benefit Strategies
- Rapha Condor–JLT
- Team SmartStop

== Stages ==
Stage results
Stage	Date	Route	Terrain	Length	Winner
1	August 18	Aspen to Aspen	Medium-mountain stage	98 km (61 mi)	Kiel Reijnen (USA)
2	August 19	Aspen to Crested Butte	Mountain stage	169 km (105 mi)	Robin Carpenter (USA)
3	August 20	Gunnison to Monarch Mountain	Mountain stage	155 km (96 mi)	Tejay van Garderen (USA)
4	August 21	Colorado Springs to Colorado Springs	Flat	113 km (70 mi)	Elia Viviani (ITA)
5	August 22	Woodland Park to Breckenridge	Medium-mountain stage	168 km (104 mi)	Laurent Didier (LUX)
6	August 23	Vail	Individual time trial	16.1 km (10.0 mi)	Tejay van Garderen (USA)
7	August 24	Boulder to Denver	Medium-mountain stage	126 km (78 mi)	Alex Howes (USA)
	Total		845.1 km (525 mi)		

== Results ==
=== Stage 1 ===
August 18, 2014 — Aspen to Aspen, 98 km (61 mi)

The opening circuit for the pro challenge began in Aspen, and consisted of three 20 miles (32 km) laps and 3,080 feet (940 m) of climbing per lap.

Stage 1 Results and General Classification after Stage 1

	Rider	Team	Time
1	Kiel Reijnen (USA)	UnitedHealthcare	2h 26' 35"
2	Alex Howes (USA)	Garmin–Sharp	+ 0"
3	Ben Hermans (BEL)	BMC Racing Team	+ 3"
4	Carter Jones (USA)	Optum–Kelly Benefit Strategies	+ 3"
5	Matthew Busche (USA)	Trek Factory Racing	+ 3"
6	Javier Mejías (ESP)	Team Novo Nordisk	+ 3"
7	Michael Schär (SUI)	BMC Racing Team	+ 12"
8	Joey Rosskopf (USA)	Hincapie Sportswear Development Team	+ 12"
9	Brent Bookwalter (USA)	BMC Racing Team	+ 12"
10	Lucas Euser (USA)	UnitedHealthcare	+ 12"

=== Stage 2 ===
August 19, 2014 — Aspen to Crested Butte, 169 km (105 mi)

Stage 2 Results

	Rider	Team	Time
1	Robin Carpenter (USA)	Hincapie Sportswear Development Team	4h 17' 18"
2	Alex Howes (USA)	Garmin–Sharp	+ 7"
3	Tejay van Garderen (USA)	BMC Racing Team	+ 7"
4	Ben Hermans (BEL)	BMC Racing Team	+ 15"
5	Tom Danielson (USA)	Garmin–Sharp	+ 17"
6	Matthew Busche (USA)	Trek Factory Racing	+ 17"
7	Julian Kyer (USA)	Team SmartStop	+ 20"
8	Joey Rosskopf (USA)	Hincapie Sportswear Development Team	+ 23"
9	Serghei Țvetcov (ROU)	Jelly Belly–Maxxis	+ 24"
10	Rob Britton (CAN)	Team SmartStop	+ 24"

General Classification after Stage 2

	Rider	Team	Time
1	Alex Howes (USA)	Garmin–Sharp	6h 44' 00"
2	Ben Hermans (BEL)	BMC Racing Team	+ 11"
3	Tejay van Garderen (USA)	BMC Racing Team	+ 12"
4	Matthew Busche (USA)	Trek Factory Racing	+ 13"
5	Tom Danielson (USA)	Garmin–Sharp	+ 22"
6	Julian Kyer (USA)	Team SmartStop	+ 25"
7	Joey Rosskopf (USA)	Hincapie Sportswear Development Team	+ 28"
8	Serghei Țvetcov (ROU)	Jelly Belly–Maxxis	+ 29"
9	Clément Chevrier (FRA)	Bissell Development Team	+ 29"
10	Rob Britton (CAN)	Team SmartStop	+ 29"

=== Stage 3 ===
August 20, 2014 — Gunnison to Monarch Mountain, 155 km (96 mi)

Stage 3 Results

	Rider	Team	Time
1	Tejay van Garderen (USA)	BMC Racing Team	3h 50' 41"
2	Rafał Majka (POL)	Tinkoff–Saxo	+ 0"
3	Serghei Țvetcov (ROU)	Jelly Belly–Maxxis	+ 20"
4	Ben Hermans (BEL)	BMC Racing Team	+ 24"
5	Tom Danielson (USA)	Garmin–Sharp	+ 24"
6	Carter Jones (USA)	Optum–Kelly Benefit Strategies	+ 30"
7	Joey Rosskopf (USA)	Hincapie Sportswear Development Team	+ 39"
8	Matthew Busche (USA)	Trek Factory Racing	+ 45"
9	Bartosz Huzarski (POL)	NetApp–Endura	+ 51"
10	Clément Chevrier (FRA)	Bissell Development Team	+ 1' 06"

General Classification after Stage 3

	Rider	Team	Time
1	Tejay van Garderen (USA)	BMC Racing Team	10h 34' 53"
2	Rafał Majka (POL)	Tinkoff–Saxo	+ 20"
3	Ben Hermans (BEL)	BMC Racing Team	+ 23"
4	Tom Danielson (USA)	Garmin–Sharp	+ 34"
5	Serghei Țvetcov (ROU)	Jelly Belly–Maxxis	+ 37"
6	Matthew Busche (USA)	Trek Factory Racing	+ 46"
7	Carter Jones (USA)	Optum–Kelly Benefit Strategies	+ 49"
8	Joey Rosskopf (USA)	Hincapie Sportswear Development Team	+ 55"
9	Bartosz Huzarski (POL)	NetApp–Endura	+ 1' 09"
10	Julian Kyer (USA)	Team SmartStop	+ 1' 22"

=== Stage 4 ===
August 21, 2014 — Colorado Springs to Colorado Springs, 113 km (70 mi)

Stage 4 Results

	Rider	Team	Time
1	Elia Viviani (ITA)	Cannondale	2h 28' 52"
2	Martin Kohler (SUI)	BMC Racing Team	+ 0"
3	Serghei Țvetcov (ROU)	Jelly Belly–Maxxis	+ 0"
4	Tyler Magner (USA)	Hincapie Sportswear Development Team	+ 0"
5	Kiel Reijnen (USA)	UnitedHealthcare	+ 0"
6	Jure Kocjan (SLO)	Team SmartStop	+ 0"
7	Alex Howes (USA)	Garmin–Sharp	+ 0"
8	Jonathan Cantwell (AUS)	Drapac Professional Cycling	+ 0"
9	Brent Bookwalter (USA)	BMC Racing Team	+ 0"
10	Ryan Anderson (CAN)	Optum–Kelly Benefit Strategies	+ 0"

General Classification after Stage 4

	Rider	Team	Time
1	Tejay van Garderen (USA)	BMC Racing Team	13h 03' 45"
2	Rafał Majka (POL)	Tinkoff–Saxo	+ 20"
3	Ben Hermans (BEL)	BMC Racing Team	+ 23"
4	Tom Danielson (USA)	Garmin–Sharp	+ 34"
5	Serghei Țvetcov (ROU)	Jelly Belly–Maxxis	+ 37"
6	Matthew Busche (USA)	Trek Factory Racing	+ 46"
7	Carter Jones (USA)	Optum–Kelly Benefit Strategies	+ 49"
8	Joey Rosskopf (USA)	Hincapie Sportswear Development Team	+ 55"
9	Bartosz Huzarski (POL)	NetApp–Endura	+ 1' 09"
10	Julian Kyer (USA)	Team SmartStop	+ 1' 22"

=== Stage 5 ===
August 22, 2014 — Woodland Park to Breckenridge, 168 km (104 mi)

Stage 5 Results

	Rider	Team	Time
1	Laurent Didier (LUX)	Trek Factory Racing	3h 50' 38"
2	Janier Acevedo (COL)	Garmin–Sharp	+ 0"
3	Rob Britton (CAN)	Team SmartStop	+ 0"
4	Ben King (USA)	Garmin–Sharp	+ 15"
5	José Mendes (POR)	NetApp–Endura	+ 1' 11"
6	Daniel Eaton (USA)	Bissell Development Team	+ 1' 26"
7	Serghei Țvetcov (ROU)	Jelly Belly–Maxxis	+ 1' 33"
8	Richard Handley (GBR)	Rapha Condor–JLT	+ 1' 33"
9	Tejay van Garderen (USA)	BMC Racing Team	+ 1' 33"
10	Rafał Majka (POL)	Tinkoff–Saxo	+ 1' 33"

General Classification after Stage 5

	Rider	Team	Time
1	Tejay van Garderen (USA)	BMC Racing Team	16h 55' 56"
2	Rafał Majka (POL)	Tinkoff–Saxo	+ 20"
3	Serghei Țvetcov (ROU)	Jelly Belly–Maxxis	+ 37"
4	Tom Danielson (USA)	Garmin–Sharp	+ 39"
5	Matthew Busche (USA)	Trek Factory Racing	+ 51"
6	Joey Rosskopf (USA)	Hincapie Sportswear Development Team	+ 1' 14"
7	Carter Jones (USA)	Optum–Kelly Benefit Strategies	+ 1' 22"
8	Bartosz Huzarski (POL)	NetApp–Endura	+ 1' 28"
9	Ben Hermans (BEL)	BMC Racing Team	+ 1' 49"
10	Julian Kyer (USA)	Team SmartStop	+ 1' 55"

=== Stage 6 ===
August 23, 2014 — Vail, 16.1 km (10 mi), individual time trial (ITT)

Stage 6 Results

	Rider	Team	Time
1	Tejay van Garderen (USA)	BMC Racing Team	24' 26"
2	Tom Danielson (USA)	Garmin–Sharp	+ 53"
3	Serghei Țvetcov (ROU)	Jelly Belly–Maxxis	+ 1' 08"
4	Rafał Majka (POL)	Tinkoff–Saxo	+ 1' 29"
5	Michael Rogers (AUS)	Tinkoff–Saxo	+ 1' 40"
6	Ben Hermans (BEL)	BMC Racing Team	+ 1' 55"
7	Bartosz Huzarski (POL)	NetApp–Endura	+ 2' 07"
8	Joey Rosskopf (USA)	Hincapie Sportswear Development Team	+ 2' 17"
9	Matthew Busche (USA)	Trek Factory Racing	+ 2' 20"
10	Carter Jones (USA)	Optum–Kelly Benefit Strategies	+ 2' 21"

General Classification after Stage 6

	Rider	Team	Time
1	Tejay van Garderen (USA)	BMC Racing Team	17h 20' 22"
2	Tom Danielson (USA)	Garmin–Sharp	+ 1' 32"
3	Serghei Țvetcov (ROU)	Jelly Belly–Maxxis	+ 1' 45"
4	Rafał Majka (POL)	Tinkoff–Saxo	+ 1' 49"
5	Matthew Busche (USA)	Trek Factory Racing	+ 3' 11"
6	Joey Rosskopf (USA)	Hincapie Sportswear Development Team	+ 3' 31"
7	Bartosz Huzarski (POL)	NetApp–Endura	+ 3' 35"
8	Carter Jones (USA)	Optum–Kelly Benefit Strategies	+ 3' 43"
9	Ben Hermans (BEL)	BMC Racing Team	+ 3' 44"
10	Bruno Pires (POR)	Tinkoff–Saxo	+ 5' 35"

=== Stage 7 ===
August 24, 2014 — Boulder to Denver, 126 km (78 mi)

Stage 7 Results

	Rider	Team	Time
1	Alex Howes (USA)	Garmin–Sharp	2h 45' 20"
2	Kiel Reijnen (USA)	UnitedHealthcare	+ 0"
3	Michael Schär (SUI)	BMC Racing Team	+ 0"
4	Serghei Țvetcov (ROU)	Jelly Belly–Maxxis	+ 0"
5	Rafał Majka (POL)	Tinkoff–Saxo	+ 0"
6	Tejay van Garderen (USA)	BMC Racing Team	+ 0"
7	Jesse Anthony (USA)	Optum–Kelly Benefit Strategies	+ 0"
8	Brent Bookwalter (USA)	BMC Racing Team	+ 0"
9	Janier Acevedo (COL)	Garmin–Sharp	+ 0"
10	Carter Jones (USA)	Optum–Kelly Benefit Strategies	+ 0"

Final General Classification

	Rider	Team	Time
1	Tejay van Garderen (USA)	BMC Racing Team	20h 05' 42"
2	Tom Danielson (USA)	Garmin–Sharp	+ 1' 32"
3	Serghei Țvetcov (ROU)	Jelly Belly–Maxxis	+ 1' 45"
4	Rafał Majka (POL)	Tinkoff–Saxo	+ 1' 49"
5	Matthew Busche (USA)	Trek Factory Racing	+ 3' 11"
6	Joey Rosskopf (USA)	Hincapie Sportswear Development Team	+ 3' 31"
7	Bartosz Huzarski (POL)	NetApp–Endura	+ 3' 35"
8	Carter Jones (USA)	Optum–Kelly Benefit Strategies	+ 3' 43"
9	Ben Hermans (BEL)	BMC Racing Team	+ 3' 44"
10	Bruno Pires (POR)	Tinkoff–Saxo	+ 5' 35"

== Classification leadership ==
In the USA Pro Cycling Challenge, five jerseys are awarded. For the general classification, calculated by adding the finishing times of the stages per cyclist, the leader receives a yellow jersey. This classification is considered the most important of the USA Pro Cycling Challenge, and the winner of the general classification will be considered the winner of the event.

Additionally, there is also a sprints classification, akin to what is called the points classification in other races, which awards a green jersey. Points are gathered at sprint line performances as well as finishing the stage in the top-fifteen places.

There is also a mountains classification, which awards a red jersey. In the mountains classifications, points are won by reaching the top of a mountain before other cyclists. Each climb is categorized, either first, second, third, or fourth category, with more points available for the harder climbs.

There is also a youth classification. This classification is calculated the same way as the general classification, but only young cyclists (under 23) are included. The leader of the young rider classification receives a blue jersey.

The last jersey is awarded to the most aggressive rider of a stage for him to wear on the next stage. It is generally awarded to a rider who attacks constantly or spends a lot of time in the breakaways. This jersey is orange.

There is also a classification for teams. In this classification, the times of the best three cyclists per stage are added, and the team with the lowest time is the leader.

Stage	Winner	General classification	Sprints classification	Mountains classification	Young rider classification	Most Aggressive	Team classification
1	Kiel Reijnen	Kiel Reijnen	Kiel Reijnen	Ben Jacques-Maynes	Clément Chevrier	Daniel Summerhill	BMC Racing Team
2	Robin Carpenter	Alex Howes	Kiel Reijnen	Ben Jacques-Maynes	Clément Chevrier	Robin Carpenter	BMC Racing Team
3	Tejay van Garderen	Tejay van Garderen	Kiel Reijnen	Tejay van Garderen	Clément Chevrier	Michael Rogers	BMC Racing Team
4	Elia Viviani	Tejay van Garderen	Kiel Reijnen	Ben Jacques-Maynes	Clément Chevrier	Jens Voigt	BMC Racing Team
5	Laurent Didier	Tejay van Garderen	Kiel Reijnen	Ben Jacques-Maynes	Clément Chevrier	Ben King	Garmin–Sharp
6	Tejay van Garderen	Tejay van Garderen	Kiel Reijnen	Ben Jacques-Maynes	Clément Chevrier	Not awarded	BMC Racing Team
7	Alex Howes	Tejay van Garderen	Kiel Reijnen	Ben Jacques-Maynes	Clément Chevrier	Jens Voigt	BMC Racing Team
Final		Tejay van Garderen	Kiel Reijnen	Ben Jacques-Maynes	Clément Chevrier	No final award	BMC Racing Team
