= Bouhanni =

Bouhanni is a surname. Notable people with the surname include:

- Nacer Bouhanni (born 1990), French cyclist
- Rayane Bouhanni (born 1996), French cyclist, brother of Nacer
