= Taylor Eisenhart =

American bicycle racer (born 1994)

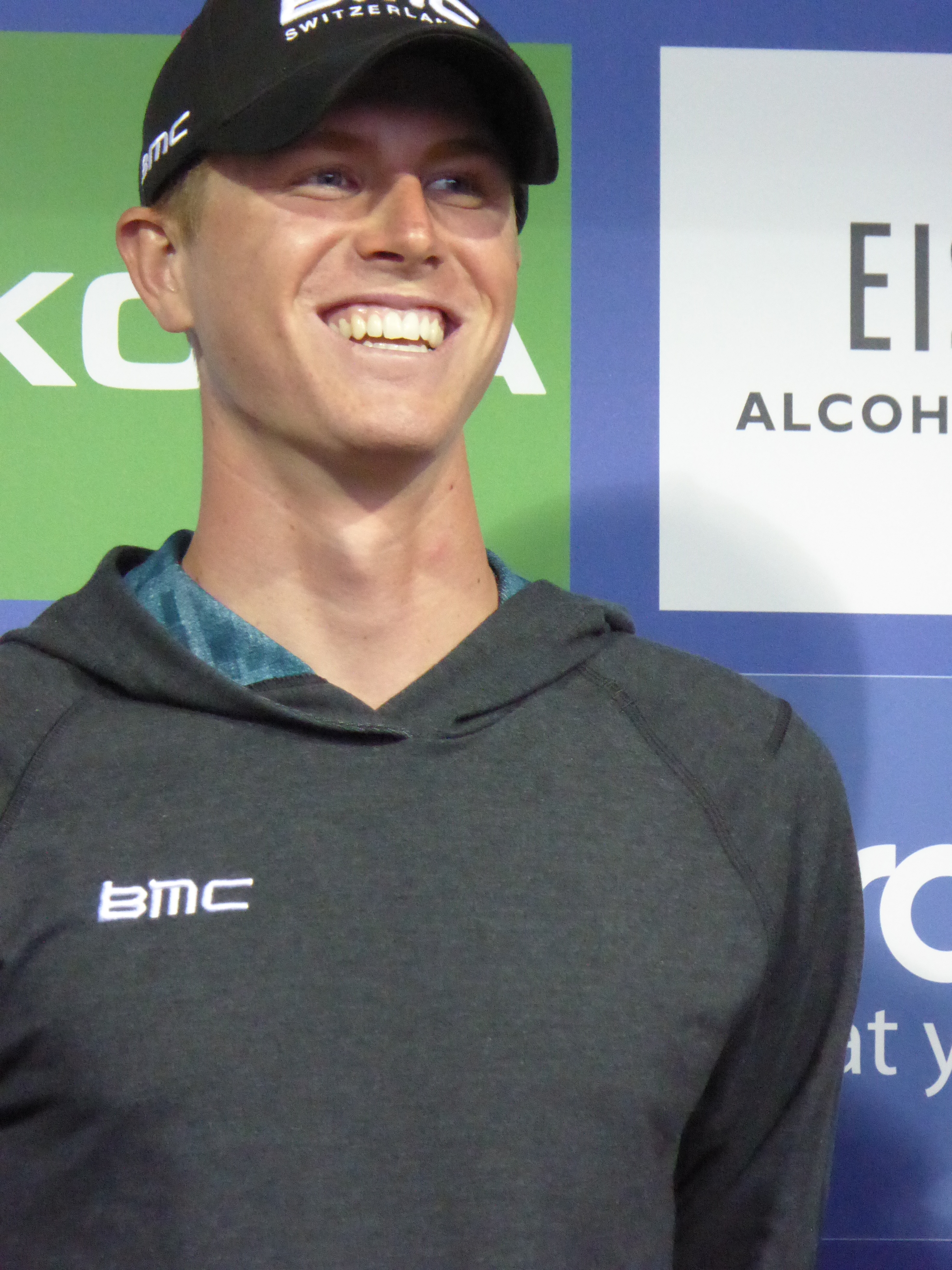
- Eisenhart at the 2016 Tour of Britain

Personal information
- Full name: Taylor Eisenhart
- Nicknames: Timo; TJ
- Born: June 14, 1994 (age 32) American Fork, Utah

Cycling career
- Sport: Cycling
- Current team: Imaginary Collective
- Disciplines: Road (former); Mountain biking
- Role: Rider
- Rider type: Climber

Amateur teams
- 2013–2016: BMC Development Team
- 2020–: Imaginary Collective

Professional teams
- 2016: BMC Racing Team (stagiaire)
- 2017–2019: Holowesko Citadel Racing Team

Taylor Eisenhart (born June 14, 1994) is an American cyclist, who currently rides for American amateur team Imaginary Collective.

== Major results ==
2012
1st Overall Tour du Pays de Vaud

1st Stages 1 & 2a

1st Overall Tour de l'Abitibi

1st Mountains classification
1st Stages 2 & 3 (ITT)

3rd Overall Trofeo Karlsberg
10th Time trial, UCI Junior Road World Championships
10th Overall Rothaus Regio-Tour International
2013
4th Time trial, National Under-23 Road Championships
6th Overall Thüringen Rundfahrt der U23

1st Young rider classification

2014
National Under-23 Road Championships

1st Time trial
3rd Road race

5th Chrono Champenois
2015
6th Time trial, National Under-23 Road Championships
2016
1st Stage 1 (TTT) Giro della Valle d'Aosta
6th Trofeo Banca Popolare di Vicenza
7th Overall Tour of Utah
2017
1st Overall Redlands Bicycle Classic

1st Stage 2

3rd Overall Tour of the Gila
4th Overall Colorado Classic
10th Winston-Salem Cycling Classic
