= Adrien Costa =

American cyclist (born 1997)

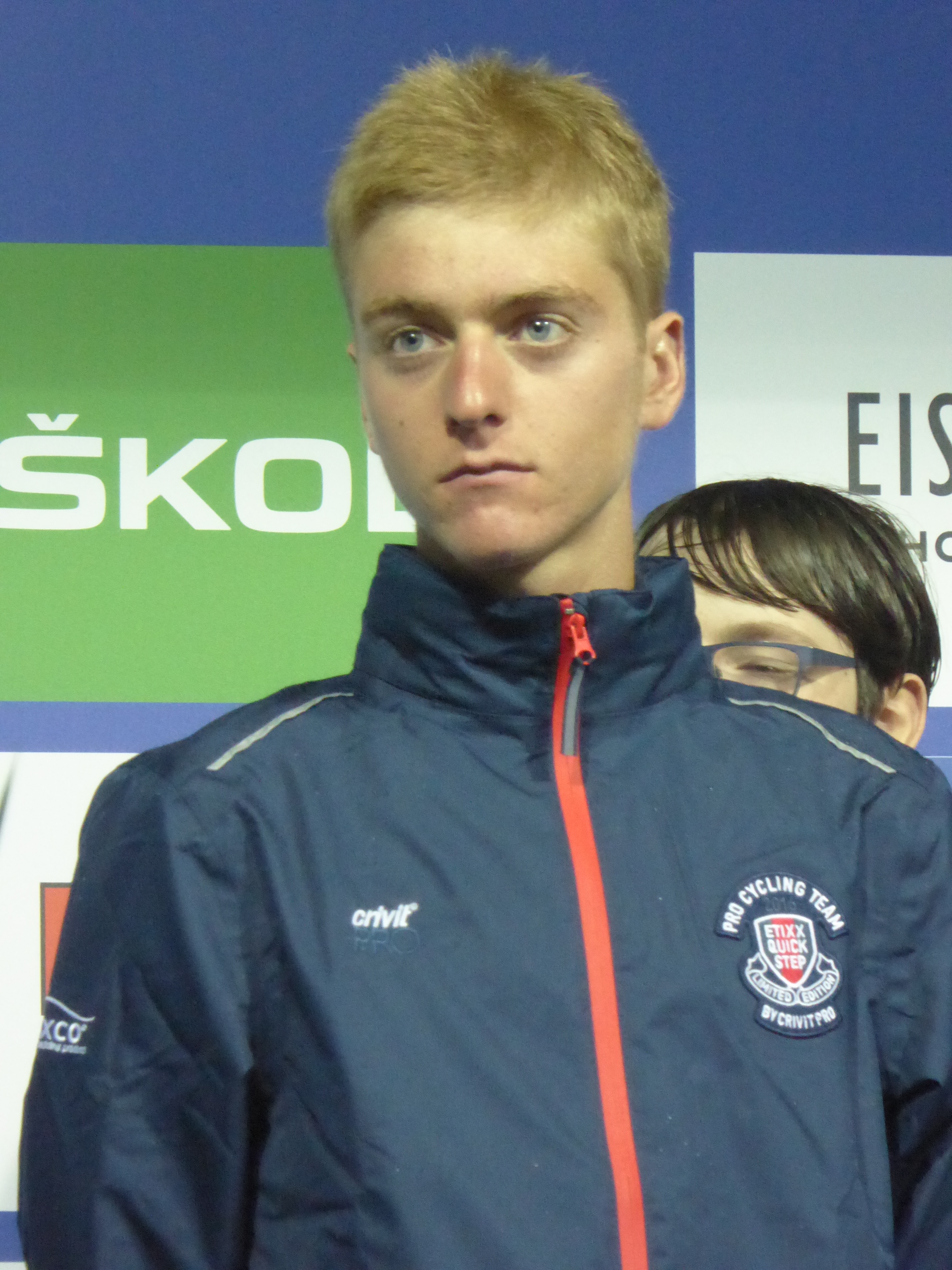
- Costa at the 2016 Tour of Britain

Personal information
- Full name: Adrien Costa
- Born: August 19, 1997 (age 29) Stanford, California, United States
- Height: 1.83 m (6 ft 0 in)

Cycling career
- Sport: Cycling
- Current team: Retired
- Discipline: Road
- Role: Rider
- Rider type: Time trialist

Amateur teams
- 2012–2013: Slipstream–Craddock
- 2014–2015: Hagens Berman U23

Professional teams
- 2016–2017: Axeon–Hagens Berman
- 2016: Etixx–Quick-Step (stagiaire)
Medal record
Representing United States
World Championships
Silver medal – second place	2014 Ponferrada	Junior Time Trial
Silver medal – second place	2015 Richmond	Junior Time Trial

Adrien Costa (born August 19, 1997) is an American former cyclist, who rode professionally for UCI Professional Continental team Axeon–Hagens Berman in 2016 and 2017.

== Career ==
=== Junior career ===
Costa had a very successful career as a junior, with over 12 victories. In 2014, he won the junior national time trial championships, along with a second place at the junior world time trial championships. In addition to these, he won the general classification and two stages of the Tour du Pays de Vaud. The following year, Costa won the Tour du Pays de Vaud for the second year in a row, along with another silver medal at the junior world time trial championships. He enjoyed success in the Tour de l'Abitibi, winning the GC and earning two stage victories. The previous year, Costa had placed 7th overall at the race, winning stage 3. Costa booked yet another win at the Course de la Paix Juniors, when he won stage 3.

=== 2016 ===
Costa's cycling success continued in the 2016 season as his first year as a professional when he earned his biggest result yet, when he won the Tour de Bretagne. Costa was the first American to win the French stage race. He stole the yellow jersey when he won the fourth stage in a solo breakaway. Costa celebrated success in other similar events, winning the mountains classification placing 3rd overall in the Rhône-Alpes Isère Tour. He also placed 5th in Le Triptyque des Monts et Châteaux. At the Tour of Utah, Costa finished 2nd overall, 1:09 behind winner Lachlan Morton. He earned another podium in the Tour de l'Avenir, finishing in 3rd place and won stage 4.

Costa last raced professionally in April 2017, before taking a break from July 2017 and subsequently opting out of his contract with Hagens Berman Axeon for 2018. Costa was reported to be studying outdoor leadership and tourism at Oregon State University.

== Rock climbing incident ==
On July 29, 2018, Costa was severely injured in a rock climbing accident, resulting in an above-the-knee amputation of his right leg.

== Major results ==
2014
1st Time trial, National Junior Road Championships
1st Overall Tour du Pays de Vaud

1st Young rider classification
1st Stages 2 & 3 (ITT)

2nd Time trial, UCI Junior Road World Championships
7th Overall Tour de l'Abitibi

1st Stage 3 (ITT)

2015
1st Overall Tour de l'Abitibi

1st Points classification
1st Stages 6 & 7

1st Overall Tour du Pays de Vaud

1st Stages 2a & 2b (ITT)

2nd Time trial, UCI Junior Road World Championships
2nd Time trial, National Junior Road Championships
2nd Overall Course de la Paix Juniors

1st Mountains classification
1st Stage 3

3rd Overall Redlands Bicycle Classic
10th Overall Trofeo Karlsberg
2016
1st Overall Tour de Bretagne

1st Young rider classification
1st Stage 4

1st Stage 4 (ITT) Tour de Savoie Mont-Blanc
2nd Overall Tour of Utah

1st Mountains classification
1st Young rider classification

3rd Overall Tour de l'Avenir

1st Stage 4 (ITT)

3rd Overall Rhône-Alpes Isère Tour

1st Mountains classification

5th Overall Le Triptyque des Monts et Châteaux

1st Young rider classification

7th Ronde van Vlaanderen Beloften
9th Flèche Ardennaise
2017
5th Giro del Belvedere
