= Kiel Reijnen =

American cyclist

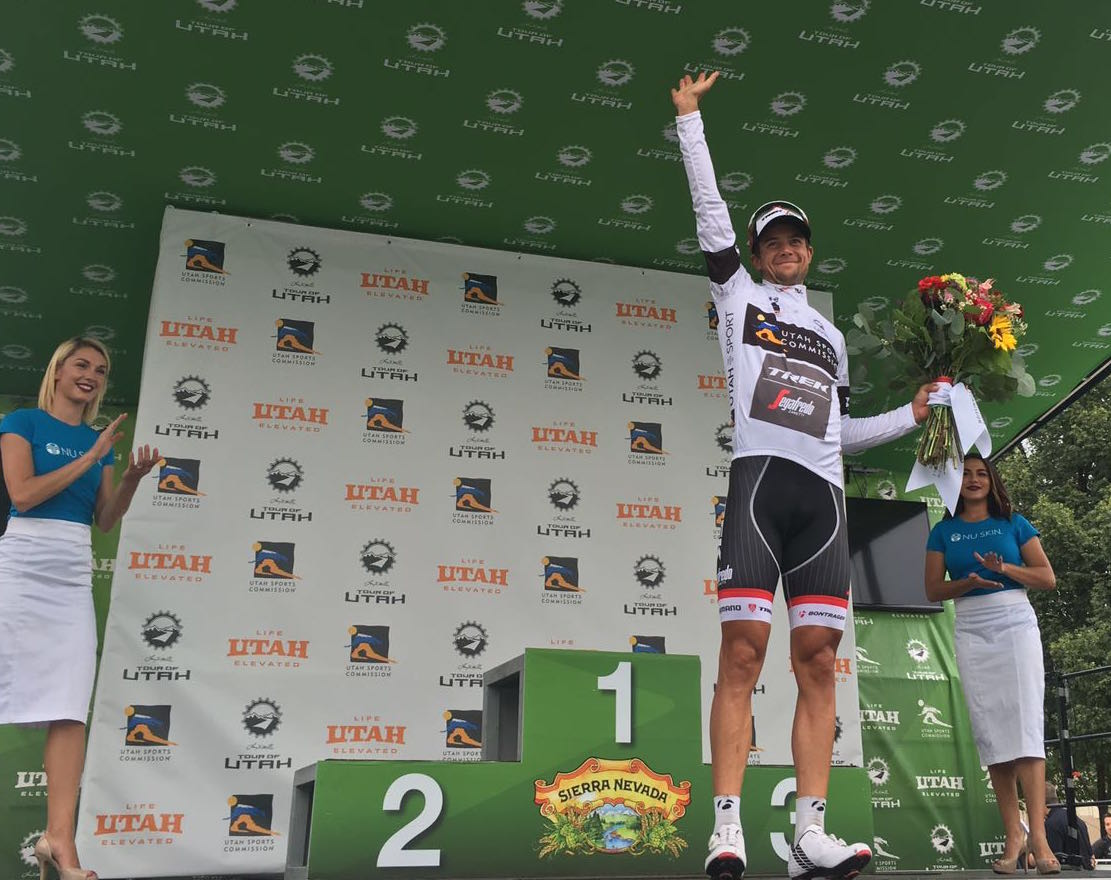

Personal information
- Born: June 1, 1986 (age 40) Bainbridge Island, Washington
- Height: 1.80 m (5 ft 11 in)
- Weight: 63 kg (139 lb)

Cycling career
- Sport: Cycling
- Current team: Trek Driftless
- Disciplines: Road; Gravel
- Role: Rider
- Rider type: Sprinter (road)

Amateur teams
- 2008: Waste Management
- 2022–: Trek Driftless

Professional teams
- 2008–2010: Jelly Belly Cycling Team
- 2011–2012: Team Type 1–Sanofi Aventis
- 2013–2015: UnitedHealthcare
- 2016–2021: Trek–Segafredo

Kiel Reijnen (born June 1, 1986) is an American cyclist, who currently competes for American gravel team Trek Driftless. Reijnen previously competed in road racing between 2008 and 2021 for the Jelly Belly–Kenda, Team Type 1–Sanofi, UnitedHealthcare and Trek–Segafredo teams.

== Career ==
Reijnen was born in Bainbridge Island, Washington.

In 2010 he finished third in the United States National Road Race Championships, and had several strong results while riding in events in the 2009–10 UCI Asia Tour – he won the Tour of Thailand, finished third in the Tour of Qinghai Lake, and came in the top 10 of both the Tour of Hainan and the Tour de Korea. After moving to Team Type 1–Sanofi Aventis, he missed more than six months of racing in 2011 due to a virus, but finished the season with an overall victory in the Tour du Rwanda – part of the 2011–12 UCI Africa Tour – as well as four stage wins. In 2012, he finished third in the United States National Road Race Championships for the second time in three years, and finished ninth overall at the Tour of Qinghai Lake.

=== UnitedHealthcare (2013–15) ===
In 2013 he switched teams to UnitedHealthcare, and competed in the Tour of the Gila, where he won stage 4, and also the Tour of Utah where he finished 3rd in the points classification behind Michael Matthews and Greg Van Avermaet. He won the Philadelphia International Cycling Classic and finished third again at the United States National Road Race Championships. In 2014 he finished second to Jure Kocjan in the points classification at the Tour of Utah, won the Philadelphia International Cycling Classic for the second successive year as well as a stage and the sprints classification in the USA Pro Cycling Challenge. In 2015 he once again won a stage and the sprints competition in the USA Pro Cycling Challenge, and won the King of the Mountains competition in the Tour de Langkawi. For the fourth time in six years, he finished third at the United States National Road Race Championships, and won the opening stage of the Tour of Utah.

=== Trek–Segafredo (2016–21) ===
In September 2015, Reijnen signed a contract with Trek Factory Racing, later renamed Trek–Segafredo, for the 2016 season. He won the fifth stage of the Tour of Utah and took the overall points classification. Reijnen also entered the first Grand Tour of his career when he was named in the startlist for the Vuelta a España. During the race he earned two top 10 stage finishes while riding as a domestique, in support of Spain's Haimar Zubeldia, as well as Fabio Felline, who ultimately won the points classification. In 2017, Reijnen took another top-ten finish at the United States National Road Race Championships, and he made his individual début at the UCI Road World Championships, competing in the road race. He contested the Vuelta a España in 2018, and 2019, completing both. In the latter, he was initially riding in support of Gianluca Brambilla as well as sprinter John Degenkolb, but Degenkolb was unable to claim any stage victories and the highest placed rider on the general classification ended up being fellow American Peter Stetina. In his final two seasons, Reijnen did not record any top-ten finishes and he failed to finish the 2021 Vuelta a España.

=== Gravel racing ===
In June 2021, he competed in Unbound Gravel, being a favorite to win along with other American professionals including Ian Boswell and Quinn Simmons. Unfortunately for Reijnen he suffered a mechanical early in the race while riding in the front group. He was no longer concerned with winning the race, but he wanted to finish the race to honor the hundreds of other participating riders. As such he picked up his bike and began running, hoping to reach the first neutral zone about thirty miles away where he could have repairs made. After making some running repairs to get his bike rolling again, so he no longer had to carry it, he continued walking, but after eighteen miles he realized he did not have enough water for the remaining journey and withdrew from the race.

Following his retirement from road racing, Reijnen formed part of a three-rider Trek Driftless setup for the 2022 season along with Amity Rockwell and Ruth Winder, who had also retired from road racing following the 2021 season.

== Personal life ==
Reijnen attended the University of Colorado Boulder and obtained a degree in mechanical engineering. A member of the Cowlitz Indian Tribe, Reijnen is married with two daughters.

== Major results ==
2008
5th Overall Tour of Hainan
2010
1st Overall Tour of Thailand

1st Stage 1 (ITT)

3rd Road race, National Road Championships
3rd Overall Tour of Qinghai Lake
4th Overall Tour of Hainan
6th Overall Tour de Korea
2011
1st Overall Tour du Rwanda

1st Prologue, Stages 1, 2 & 4

2012
3rd Road race, National Road Championships
9th Overall Tour of Qinghai Lake
2013
1st Philadelphia International Cycling Classic
1st Bucks County Classic
1st Stage 4 Tour of the Gila
3rd Road race, National Road Championships
2014
1st Philadelphia International Cycling Classic
Armed Forces Association Cycling Classic

1st Clarendon Cup
1st Crystal Cup

USA Pro Cycling Challenge

1st Sprints classification
1st Stage 1

2015
USA Pro Cycling Challenge

1st Sprints classification
1st Stage 3

1st Stage 1 Tour of Utah
1st Mountains classification Tour de Langkawi
3rd Road race, National Road Championships
2016
Tour of Utah

1st Sprints classification
1st Stage 5

=== Grand Tour general classification results timeline ===
| Grand Tour | 2016 | 2017 | 2018 | 2019 | 2020 | 2021 |
|---|---|---|---|---|---|---|
| Giro d'Italia | Did not contest during his career | | | | | |
| Tour de France | Did not contest during his career | | | | | |
| Vuelta a España | 132 | — | 135 | 141 | — | DNF |

Legend
| — | Did not compete |
| DNF | Did not finish |
