= Lachlan Morton =

Australian road cyclist

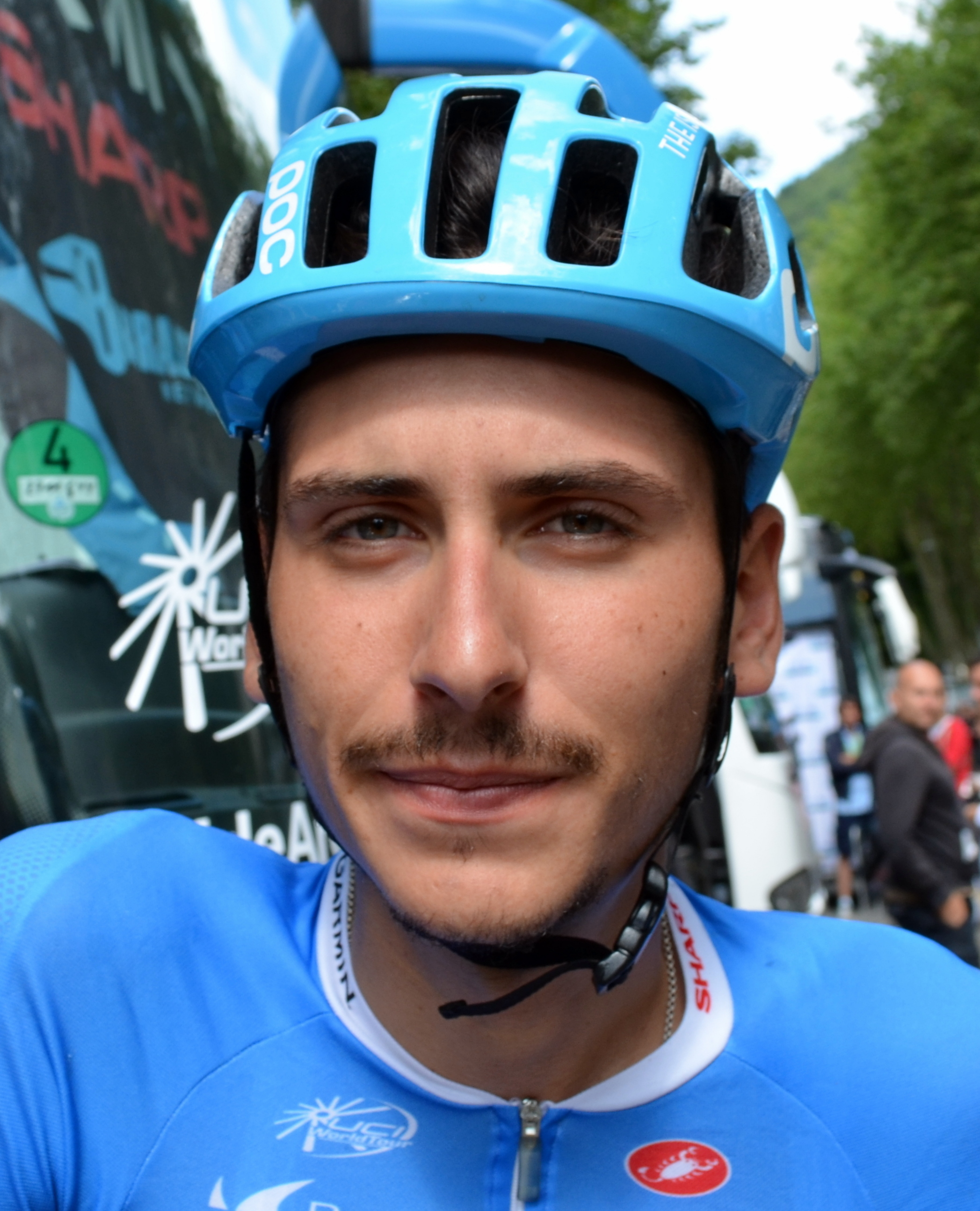
- Morton at the 2014 Tour de l'Ain

Personal information
- Full name: Lachlan David Morton
- Nickname: Lachy
- Born: 2 January 1992 (age 34) Port Macquarie, New South Wales, Australia
- Height: 1.80 m (5 ft 11 in)
- Weight: 62 kg (137 lb)

Cycling career
- Sport: Cycling
- Current team: EF Education–EasyPost
- Disciplines: Road; Gravel
- Role: Rider
- Rider type: Climber (road)

Amateur teams
- 2011–2012: Chipotle–Garmin Development Team
- 2012: Garmin–Sharp (stagiaire)

Professional teams
- 2013–2014: Garmin–Sharp
- 2015–2016: Jelly Belly–Maxxis
- 2017–2018: Team Dimension Data
- 2019–: EF Education First

Major wins
- Stage races Tour of Utah (2016)

Lachlan David Morton (born 2 January 1992) is an Australian professional gravel and road racing cyclist, who currently rides for UCI WorldTeam EF Education–EasyPost.

== Career ==
Born and raised in Port Macquarie, New South Wales, Australia, Morton spent the 2011 and 2012 seasons in the Garmin–Sharp squad's development stable, Chipotle–First Solar Development Team.

Following a successful 2016 season including stage and overall wins at the Tour of the Gila and the Tour of Utah, in September 2016 Team Dimension Data confirmed that Morton would join them for 2017, reuniting him with former Garmin teammate Ben King. He was named in the startlist for the 2017 Vuelta a España. In October 2020, he was named in the startlist for the 2020 Giro d'Italia.

=== Ultra-distance cycling ===
Morton has participated in a number of ultra-distance cycling events and challenges. In 2014 he completed a 2,500-kilometre (1,600-mile) ride from Port Macquarie to Uluru with his brother Angus Morton. The brothers made a documentary film about the ride titled "Thereabouts". In 2015 "Thereabouts Reprise" was released about a 600-mile (970-kilometre) ride across the Colorado Rockies that Morton completed with his brother, and professional cyclists Taylor Phinney and Cameron Wurf. In 2017 the Morton brothers released a third documentary titled "Thereabouts Colombia" about cycling in Colombia.

In 2019 Morton participated in the Unbound Gravel, Leadville 100, GBDuro and Three Peaks Cyclocross races as part of EF Pro Cycling's alternative calendar. He was first to finish the 2019 GBDuro, a 2,000-kilometre (1,200-mile) challenge from Land's End to John o' Groats in the United Kingdom. In May 2020 he set a new record of 11 hours and 14 minutes for the 142-mile (229-kilometre) Kokopelli's Trail in the United States. In September 2020 he won the Badlands, a 700 kilometre race across the Iberian Peninsula.

The official record time for the Tour Divide, a self-supported mountain bike race across the Great Divide, is 13 days, 2 hours, and 16 minutes, set by Justinas Leveika in 2024. This surpassed the previous record of 13 days, 22 hours, and 51 minutes, held by Mike Hall since 2016. In 2023, Lachlan Morton completed the route in 12 days, 12 hours, and 21 minutes — the fastest known time — but his effort is not recognized as an official record due to course deviations and the presence of a media crew, which contravenes the event’s self-supported rules.

=== Everesting ===
Morton held the Everesting world record, completing the feat in 7:29:57 on 20 June 2020. The feat garnered significant publicity, as Morton had made an attempt just days earlier which was disqualified by Hells 500, who stated that he had not reached the threshold to count as an Everesting. Since then, Alberto Contador and three other riders have surpassed Morton's time.

=== 2021 Alt Tour ===
In 2021, Morton completed an "Alt Tour", riding the entire 2021 Tour de France route, including transfers, unsupported in aid of World Bicycle Relief. He started in Brittany on the same day as the regular Tour, but built up a lead on the peloton by riding for 12 hours a day. After 5,510-kilometre (3,420-mile) and 16 days, he finished the ride in Paris about 5 days ahead of the peloton.

=== 2024 Australia lap ===
In 2024 Morton set out to break the Road Record Association of Australia record for cycling around Australia known as "The Lap". In October it was reported he accomplished that feat by setting a new record of 30 days, nine hours and 59 minutes, an improvement to the 2011 record by David Alley of 37 days, 20 hours and 45 minutes.

== Major results ==
2009
5th Time trial, National Junior Road Championships
2010
1st Overall Tour de l'Abitibi

1st Stages 3 (ITT) & 6

7th Overall Tour of Utah
2011
2nd Overall Cascade Cycling Classic
3rd Overall Tour of the Gila
6th Overall Tour de Langkawi
7th Overall Giro do Interior de São Paulo
2012
6th Overall Tour de Guadeloupe

1st Young rider classification

8th Overall Giro della Valle d'Aosta
2013
Tour of Utah

1st Young rider classification
1st Stage 3

5th Overall USA Pro Cycling Challenge

1st Young rider classification

2015
1st Mount Evans Hill Climb
5th Overall USA Pro Cycling Challenge
9th Overall Tour de Beauce
10th Overall Tour of Utah
2016
1st Overall Tour of Utah

1st Stages 3 & 7

1st Overall Tour of the Gila

1st Stage 1

1st Stage 4 Tour de Hokkaido
4th Overall Tour de Beauce
2017
7th Overall Tour of California

1st Young rider classification

8th Overall Tour of Oman
2019
1st GBDURO
1st Stage 5 Tour of Utah
3rd Leadville Trail 100 MTB
4th Unbound Gravel 200
2021
1st Telluride 100 MTB
2nd Leadville Trail 100 MTB
2023
1st Wild Horse Gravel
2nd Overall Migration Gravel Race
Record time of 12 days, 12 hours, and 21 minutes on Tour Divide trail

1st Stage 2

3rd Unbound Gravel 200
2024
1st Unbound Gravel 200
4th Leadville Trail 100 MTB
2025
2nd Unbound Gravel XL

=== Grand Tour general classification results timeline ===
Grand Tour	2017	2018	2019	2020
Giro d'Italia	—	—	—	111
Tour de France	—	—	—	—
Vuelta a España	90	—	—	—

Legend
—	Did not compete
DNF	Did not finish
