= Julian Kyer =

American bicycle racer (born 1988)

Personal information
- Full name: Julian Kyer
- Born: May 15, 1988 (age 38) United States

Cycling career
- Sport: Cycling
- Disciplines: Road, track
- Role: Rider

Professional teams
- 2009–2010: Trek–Livestrong
- 2011: Kelly Benefit Strategies–OptumHealth
- 2012–2013: Bissell
- 2014–2015: Team SmartStop
- 2016: Elevate Pro Cycling–Bicycle World

Julian Kyer (born May 15, 1988) is an American track and road cyclist. He last rode for Elevate Pro Cycling–Bicycle World. In the 2015 Tour of the Gila, Kyer broke his collarbone.

== Major results ==
2008
United States Masters - individual pursuit (U23)
2009
United States Masters - Team Pursuit (with Ian Moir, Taylor Phinney and Justin Williams)
2010
6th Overall Thüringen Rundfahrt der U23
2014
11th overall USA Pro Cycling Challenge
