= Tour du Pays de Vaud =

Race details
- Date: June
- Region: Switzerland
- Discipline: Road race
- Type: Stage race
- Race director: Alain Witz

History
- First edition: 1967
- Editions: 55 (as of 2025)
- First winner: Arthur Dahinden (SUI)
- Most wins: Alessandro Bertolini (ITA); Adrien Costa (USA); (2 wins)
- Most recent: Oskar Louw Larsen (DEN)

The Tour du Pays de Vaud is a junior (ages 17–18) multi-day cycling race held annually in Switzerland. It has been part of the UCI Junior Nations' Cup since 2015.

== Winners ==
Year	Winner	Second	Third
1967	(Switzerland) Arthur Dahinden		
1968	(Switzerland) Bruno Hubschmid		
1969	(Italy) Adriano Bonardi		
1970	(Switzerland) Werner Fretz		
1971	(Italy) Gianbattista Baronchelli		
1972	(Switzerland) Denis Champion		
1973	(Switzerland) Henri-Daniel Reymond		
1974	(Switzerland) Serge Demierre		
1975	(Switzerland) Robert Dill-Bundi		
1976	(Switzerland) Jean-Marie Grezet		
1977	(Switzerland) Hubert Seiz		
1978	(Switzerland) Jürg Bruggmann		
1979	(Switzerland) Leo Schönenberger		
1980	Cancelled		
1981	(Switzerland) Jochen Baumann		
1982	(Norway) Tarjus Larsen		
1983	(Switzerland) Marius Frei		
1984	(Austria) Norbert Kaustel		
1985	(Switzerland) Felice Puttini		
1986	(Switzerland) Jens Jentner		
1987	(Czechoslovakia) Milan Dvorščík	(Switzerland) Peter Bodenmann	(Belgium) Daniel Van Steenbergen
1988	(Italy) Alessandro Bertolini	(Switzerland) Andrea Zamboni	(Czechoslovakia) Pavel Padrnos
1989	(Italy) Alessandro Bertolini	(Italy) Nicola Loda	(Switzerland) Beat Zberg
1990	(East Germany) Danilo Klaar		
1991	(Italy) Emanuele Granzotto		
1992	Cancelled		
1993	(Switzerland) Beat Blum		
1994	(Switzerland) Rico Götz		
1995	(Switzerland) Martin Elmiger		
1996	(Switzerland) Rubens Bertogliati		
1997	(Switzerland) Sandro Güttinger		
1998	(Switzerland) Grégory Rast		
1999	(Switzerland) Fabian Cancellara		
2000	(Italy) Daniele Colli		
2001	(Switzerland) Patrick Gassmann	(Russia) Stanislav Belov	(Switzerland) Roman Andres
2002	(Russia) Dmitry Kozontchuk	(Netherlands) Dion Murk	(Switzerland) Pascal-Dario Zaugg
2003	(Netherlands) Kai Reus	(Russia) Pavel Kalinin	(Netherlands) Tom Stamsnijder
2004	(Switzerland) Michael Schär	(Czech Republic) Roman Kreuziger	(Moldova) Alexandr Pliuschin
2005	(United Kingdom) Ian Stannard	(Switzerland) Nicolas Schnyder	(Denmark) André Steensen
2006	(Italy) Daniele Ratto	(United States) Tejay van Garderen	(Lithuania) Ramūnas Navardauskas
2007	(Denmark) Christopher Juul Jensen	(Switzerland) Silvan Dillier	(Bulgaria) Evgeni Panayotov
2008	(Italy) Moreno Moser	(United Kingdom) Luke Rowe	(United Kingdom) Erick Rowsell
2009	(United States) Nathan Brown	(Denmark) Christian Mathiesen	(Netherlands) Jelle Lugten
2010	(Denmark) Lasse Norman Hansen	(Czech Republic) Petr Vakoč	(United States) Lawson Craddock
2011	(Denmark) Peter Mathiesen	(Denmark) Søren Kragh Andersen	(Switzerland) Stefan Küng
2012	(United States) Taylor Eisenhart	(Denmark) Peter Mathiesen	(Denmark) Frederik Plesner
2013	(United States) Geoffrey Curran	(Denmark) Christoffer Lisson	(Denmark) Jonas Gregaard
2014	(United States) Adrien Costa	(Luxembourg) Kevin Geniets	(United States) William Barta
2015	(United States) Adrien Costa	(Switzerland) Gino Mäder	(Denmark) Anthon Charmig
2016	(Switzerland) Marc Hirschi	(Kazakhstan) Dinmukhammed Ulysbayev	(Austria) Felix Gall
2017	(Norway) Andreas Leknessund	(France) Théo Nonnez	(Germany) Leon Heinschke
2018	(Denmark) Mattias Skjelmose Jensen	(Denmark) William Blume Levy	(Norway) Ludvig Aasheim
2019	(Germany) Marco Brenner	(Netherlands) Lars Boven	(Denmark) William Blume Levy
2020-2021	Cancelled		
2022	(Switzerland) Jan Christen	(Norway) Johannes Kulset	(Netherlands) Menno Huising
2023	Cancelled		
2024	(France) Paul Seixas	(Spain) Adrià Pericas	(Slovenia) Jakob Omrzel
2025	(Denmark) Oskar Louw Larsen	(Netherlands) Daan Dijkman	(Australia) Lucas Stevenson
