= Rob Britton =

Canadian bicycle racer (born 1984)

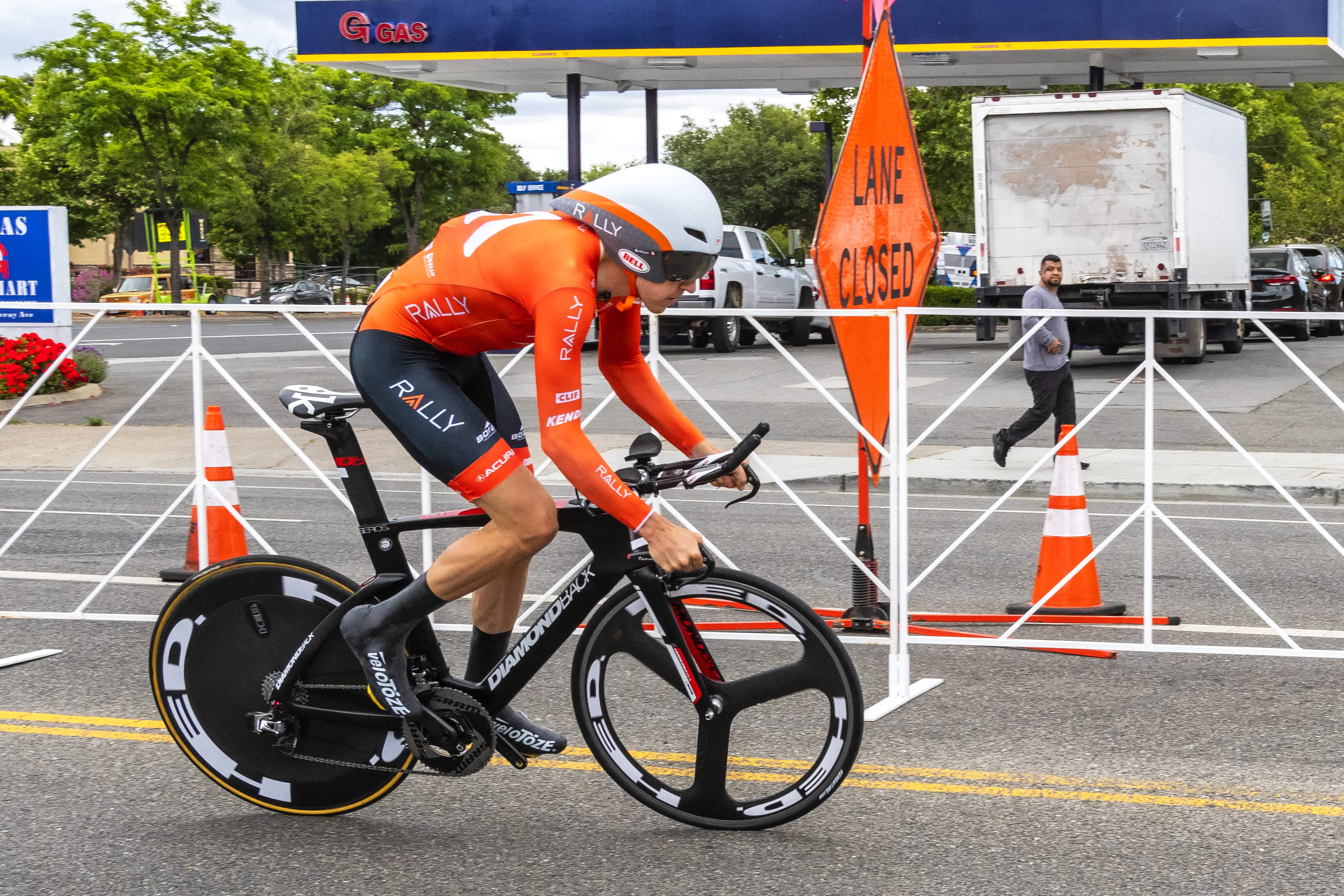
- Britton at the 2018 Tour of California

Personal information
- Full name: Robert Britton
- Born: September 22, 1984 (age 42) Regina, Saskatchewan, Canada

Cycling career
- Sport: Cycling
- Disciplines: Road; Gravel
- Role: Rider
- Rider type: All-rounder

Amateur teams
- 2008–2009: Trek Red Truck Racing–Mosaic Homes
- 2012: H&R Block

Professional teams
- 2010–2011: Bissell
- 2013: Team Raleigh
- 2014–2015: Team SmartStop
- 2016–2021: Rally Cycling

Major wins
- Stage races Tour of Utah (2017) One-day races and Classics National Time Trial Championships (2019)

Robert Britton (born September 22, 1984) is a Canadian professional cyclist, who currently competes in gravel racing. He formerly rode professionally on the road between 2010 and 2021 for the Bissell, Team Raleigh, Team SmartStop and Rally Cycling teams. He won the overall classification of the Tour of the Gila, a race held in New Mexico, in 2015, and 2018.

== Major results ==
=== Road ===
2008
1st Overall Tour of Walla Walla

1st Stage 1

2nd Overall Devo Classics Springs Stage Race

1st Stage 1 (ITT)

2009
1st Overall Devo Classics Springs Stage Race

1st Stages 2 (ITT) & 3

1st Overall Tour of Walla Walla

1st Stage 2 (ITT)

1st Stage 3 Mount Hood Cycling Classic
2010
1st Stage 1 McLane Pacific Classic
2011
1st Stage 1 McLane Pacific Classic
5th Time trial, Pan-American Championships
2012
1st Stage 2 Tour de Bowness Stage Race
3rd Overall San Dimas Stage Race
3rd Bucks County Classic
10th Overall Tour de Beauce
2014
2nd Overall Tour de Beauce
2nd Overall Vuelta a la Independencia Nacional
3rd Overall Tour of the Gila
2015
1st Overall Tour of the Gila
3rd Overall USA Pro Cycling Challenge
8th Overall Tour de Beauce
10th Overall Tour de Taiwan
10th Overall Tour of California
2016
3rd Overall Tour of the Gila
5th Overall Tour of Utah
7th Overall Tour de Beauce
2017
1st Overall Tour of Utah

1st Stage 3 (ITT)

1st Stage 5 Tour de Beauce
3rd Time trial, National Championships
4th Overall Joe Martin Stage Race
5th Overall Tour of the Gila

1st Mountains classification

8th Overall Tour of Alberta
2018
1st Overall Tour of the Gila
2nd Time trial, National Championships
5th Overall Tour de Beauce
9th Overall Colorado Classic
2019
1st Time trial, National Championships
10th Overall Tour of Utah

=== Gravel ===
2022
6th Unbound Gravel
2023
1st Badlands Long Distance Gravel Race
1st Belgian Waffle Ride – British Columbia
2024
1st Shasta Gravel Hugger
2nd Sea Otter Classic
2nd The Traka 360
3rd Overall Oregon Trail Gravel
2025
1st Unbound Gravel XL
