= Rayane Bouhanni =

French cyclist

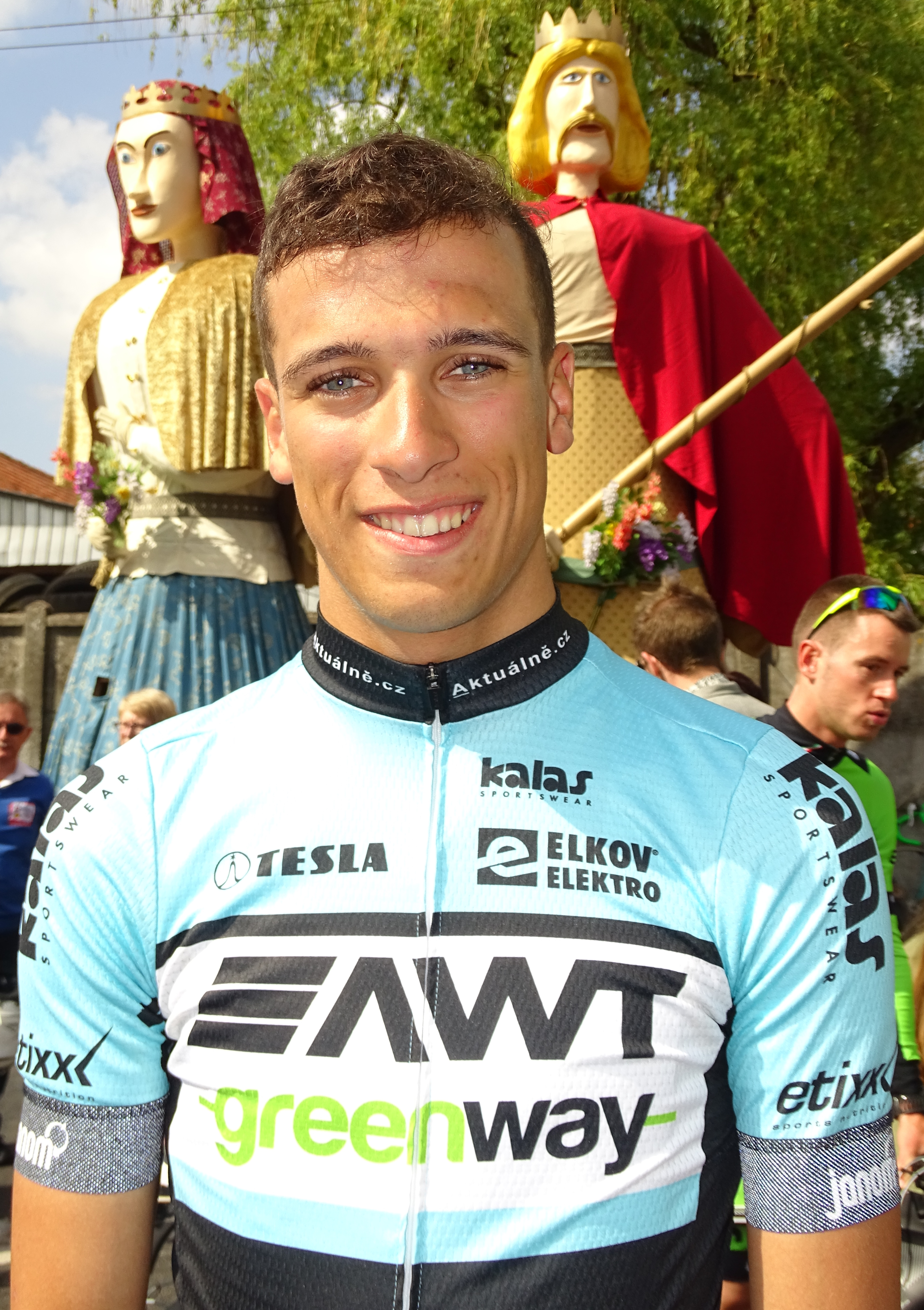
- Bouhanni in 2014.

Personal information
- Full name: Rayane Bouhanni
- Born: 24 February 1996 (age 30) Épinal, France

Cycling career
- Sport: Cycling
- Discipline: Road
- Role: Rider

Amateur team
- 2013–2014: SC Sarreguemines

Professional teams
- 2015: AWT–GreenWay
- 2015: Cofidis (stagiaire)
- 2016–2019: Cofidis

Rayane Bouhanni (born 24 February 1996 in Épinal) is a French cyclist, who last rode for UCI Professional Continental team Cofidis. He is the younger brother of Nacer Bouhanni.

== Major results ==
2014
National Junior Road Championships

1st Road race
2nd Time trial

1st Overall Tour de l'Abitibi

1st Stage 1

3rd Overall Grand Prix Rüebliland
UEC European Junior Road Championships

9th Road race
9th Time trial
