= Robin Carpenter =

American bicycle racer (born 1992)

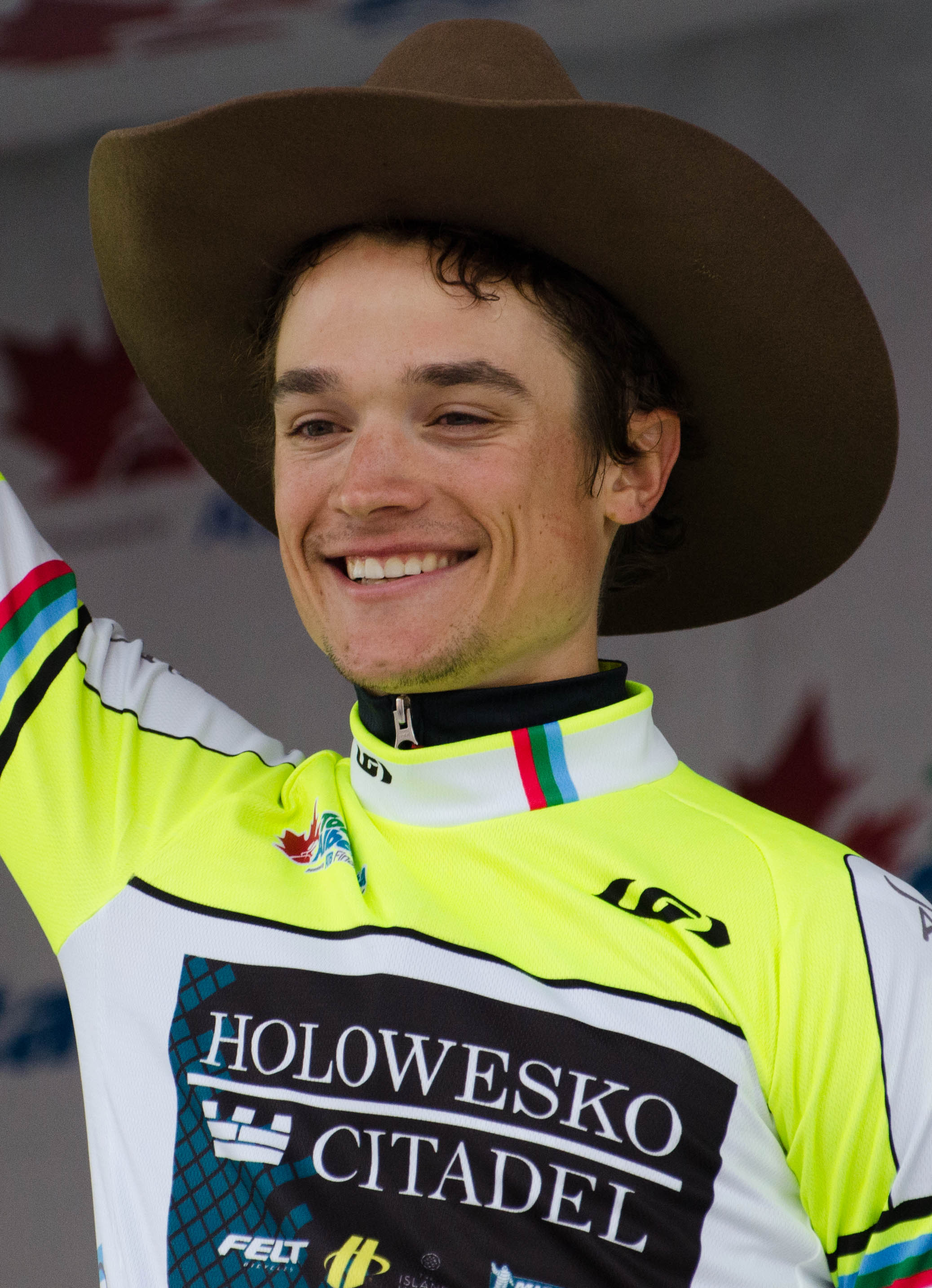
- Carpenter at the 2016 Tour of Alberta

Personal information
- Full name: Robin Carpenter
- Born: June 20, 1992 (age 34) Philadelphia, Pennsylvania, U.S.
- Height: 1.78 m (5 ft 10 in)

Cycling career
- Sport: Cycling
- Current team: Modern Adventure Pro Cycling
- Discipline: Road
- Role: Rider

Amateur team
- 2011: BikeReg.com–Cannondale

Professional teams
- 2012: Chipotle–First Solar Development Team
- 2013–2017: Hincapie Sportswear Development Team
- 2018–2022: Rally Cycling
- 2023–2025: L39ION of Los Angeles
- 2026–: Modern Adventure Pro Cycling

Robin Carpenter (born June 20, 1992) is an American cyclist, who currently rides for UCI ProTeam Modern Adventure Pro Cycling. Carpenter was born in Philadelphia. He studied at Swarthmore College and graduated in 2014 with a degree in economics and environmental studies.

== Major results ==
2010
5th Overall Tour de l'Abitibi
2011
8th Bucks County Classic
2013
1st Stage 3 Joe Martin Stage Race
1st Puivelde Kermis
2014
1st Stage 2 USA Pro Cycling Challenge
National Under-23 Road Championships

2nd Time trial
4th Road race

2015
1st Stage 2 San Dimas Stage Race
2nd Overall Cascade Cycling Classic
2016
1st Overall Tour of Alberta
1st Overall Cascade Cycling Classic
1st Stage 2 Tour of Utah
3rd Overall Tour de Beauce
4th Overall Joe Martin Stage Race
4th The Reading 120
10th Philadelphia International Cycling Classic
2017
1st Overall Joe Martin Stage Race

1st Points classification
1st Stage 4

1st Overall Cascade Cycling Classic
1st Winston-Salem Cycling Classic
1st Points classification, Tour de Beauce
3rd Overall San Dimas Stage Race

1st Stage 2

4th Road race, National Road Championships
7th Overall Redlands Bicycle Classic
2018
1st Mountains classification, Deutschland Tour
2nd Road race, National Road Championships
2nd Slag om Norg
9th Overall Danmark Rundt
2019
1st Mountains classification, Tour de Luxembourg
2nd La Roue Tourangelle
2nd Paris–Chauny
2021
1st Stage 2 Tour of Britain
2022
4th Harlem Skyscraper Classic
2023
3rd Overall Redlands Bicycle Classic

1st Stage 5

3rd Athens Twilight Criterium
1st Wells Ave Crit
2024
3rd Athens Twilight Criterium
1st Wells Ave Crit
1st Midnight Ride of CX
2025
1st Buzz The Tower
2nd Stage 2 Redlands Bicycle Classic
2nd Greenville Cycling Classic p/b Prisma Health
