= Joey Rosskopf =

American bicycle racer

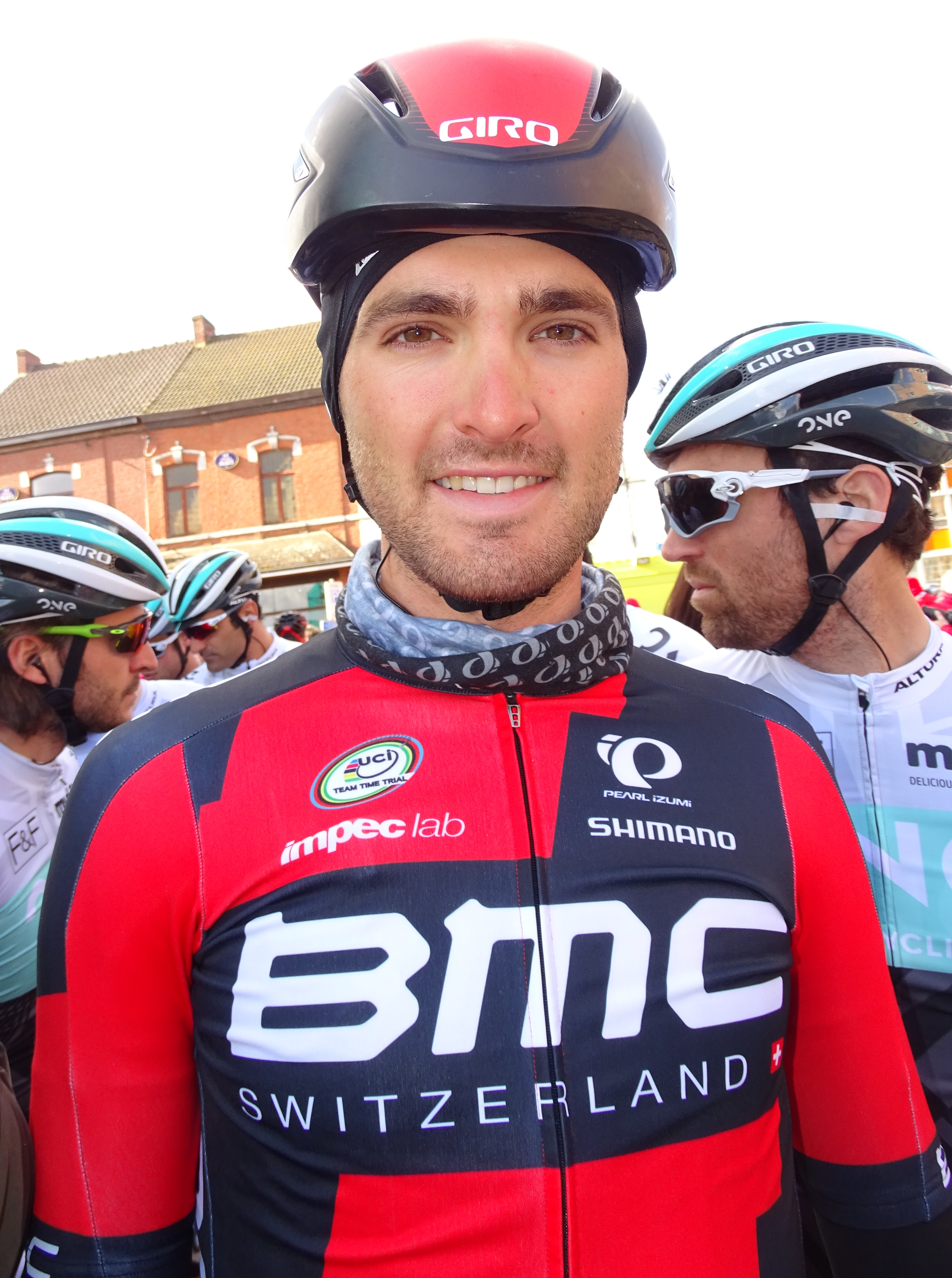
- Rosskopf in 2016

Personal information
- Full name: Joseph Rosskopf
- Born: September 5, 1989 (age 37) Decatur, Georgia, United States
- Height: 1.87 m (6 ft 2 in)
- Weight: 76 kg (168 lb; 12.0 st)

Cycling career
- Sport: Cycling
- Current team: Pinarello–Q36.5 Pro Cycling Team
- Discipline: Road
- Role: Rider

Professional teams
- 2010: Mountain Khakis–Jittery Joe’s
- 2011–2012: Team Type 1–Sanofi Aventis
- 2013–2014: Hincapie Sportswear Development Team
- 2015–2020: BMC Racing Team
- 2021–2022: Rally Cycling
- 2023–2024: Q36.5 Pro Cycling Team

Major wins
- Grand Tours Vuelta a España TTT stages (2015) One-day races and Classics National Road Race Championships (2021) National Time Trial Championships (2017, 2018)
Medal record
Men's road bicycle racing
Representing BMC Racing Team
World Championships
Silver medal – second place	2016 Doha	Team time trial
Pan American Championships
Silver medal – second place	2014 Puebla	Road race
Silver medal – second place	2014 Puebla	Individual time trial

Joseph Rosskopf (born September 5, 1989) is an American cyclist from Decatur, Georgia, who competed as a professional from 2010 to 2024.

== Career ==
A professional since 2010, Rosskopf was named in the start list for the 2015 Vuelta a España and the start list for the 2016 Giro d'Italia. He won the Tour du Limousin in 2016, and became the second rider from the Americas, after Leonardo Duque, to win the race.

Rosskopf was the winner of the United States National Time Trial Championships in 2017 and 2018. In July 2019, he was named in the startlist for the 2019 Tour de France.

In November 2020, Rosskopf signed a two-year contract with the Rally Cycling team, from the 2021 season.

== Personal ==
Rosskopf graduated from Decatur High School.

== Major results ==
2011
2nd Overall Tour du Rwanda

1st Stage 4

2012
4th Tour of the Battenkill
9th Overall New Zealand Cycle Classic
2013
1st Overall Paris–Arras Tour

1st Stage 1

1st Stage 4 (ITT) Tour de Beauce
3rd Overall Flèche du Sud
3rd Philadelphia International Championship
2014
1st Overall Redlands Bicycle Classic

1st Stage 5

1st Mountains classification, Tour of Utah
Pan American Road Championships

2nd Road race
2nd Time trial

6th Overall USA Pro Cycling Challenge
2015
1st Stage 3 (TTT) Critérium du Dauphiné
1st Stage 1 (TTT) Vuelta a España
2016
1st Overall Tour du Limousin

1st Stage 1

1st Stage 5 (TTT) Eneco Tour
2nd Team time trial, UCI Road World Championships
6th Overall Tour of Utah
10th Japan Cup
2017
1st Time trial, National Road Championships
1st Stage 2 (TTT) Volta a Catalunya
10th Overall Tour de Yorkshire
2018
1st Time trial, National Road Championships
2020
1st Mountains classification, Tour Down Under
3rd Overall Tour Poitou-Charentes en Nouvelle-Aquitaine
2021
National Road Championships

1st Road race
4th Time trial

2023
3rd Time trial, National Road Championships

=== Grand Tour general classification results timeline ===
Grand Tour	2015	2016	2017	2018	2019	2020
Giro d'Italia	—	85	70	—	—	64
Tour de France	—	—	—	—	73	—
Vuelta a España	124	—	—	81	—	—

Legend
—	Did not compete
DNF	Did not finish
