= Robbie Squire =

American cyclist

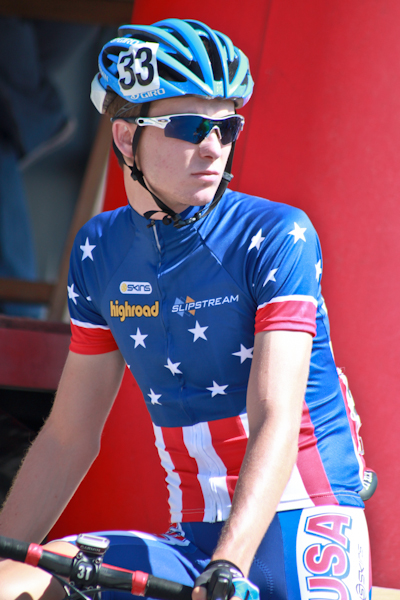
- Squire in 2011

Personal information
- Full name: Robert Squire
- Nicknames: Rob, Robbie
- Born: April 1, 1990 (age 36) Salt Lake City, Utah, U.S.

Cycling career
- Sport: Cycling
- Current team: Hincapie Racing
- Discipline: Road
- Role: Rider

Professional teams
- 2011-2012: Chipotle Development Team
- 1/2013-5/2013: Ceramica Flaminia-Fondriest
- 6/2013-12/2013: Amore & Vita
- 2014: Jamis-Hagens Berman
- 2015-: Hincapie Racing

Robert Squire (born April 1, 1990 in Salt Lake City) is an American cyclist riding for Hincapie Racing.

American is third overall at USA Pro Challenge after four stages

== Major results ==
2010
3rd Pan American Games Cross-country
2011
National U23 Road Race Champion
