= Tour de l'Abitibi =

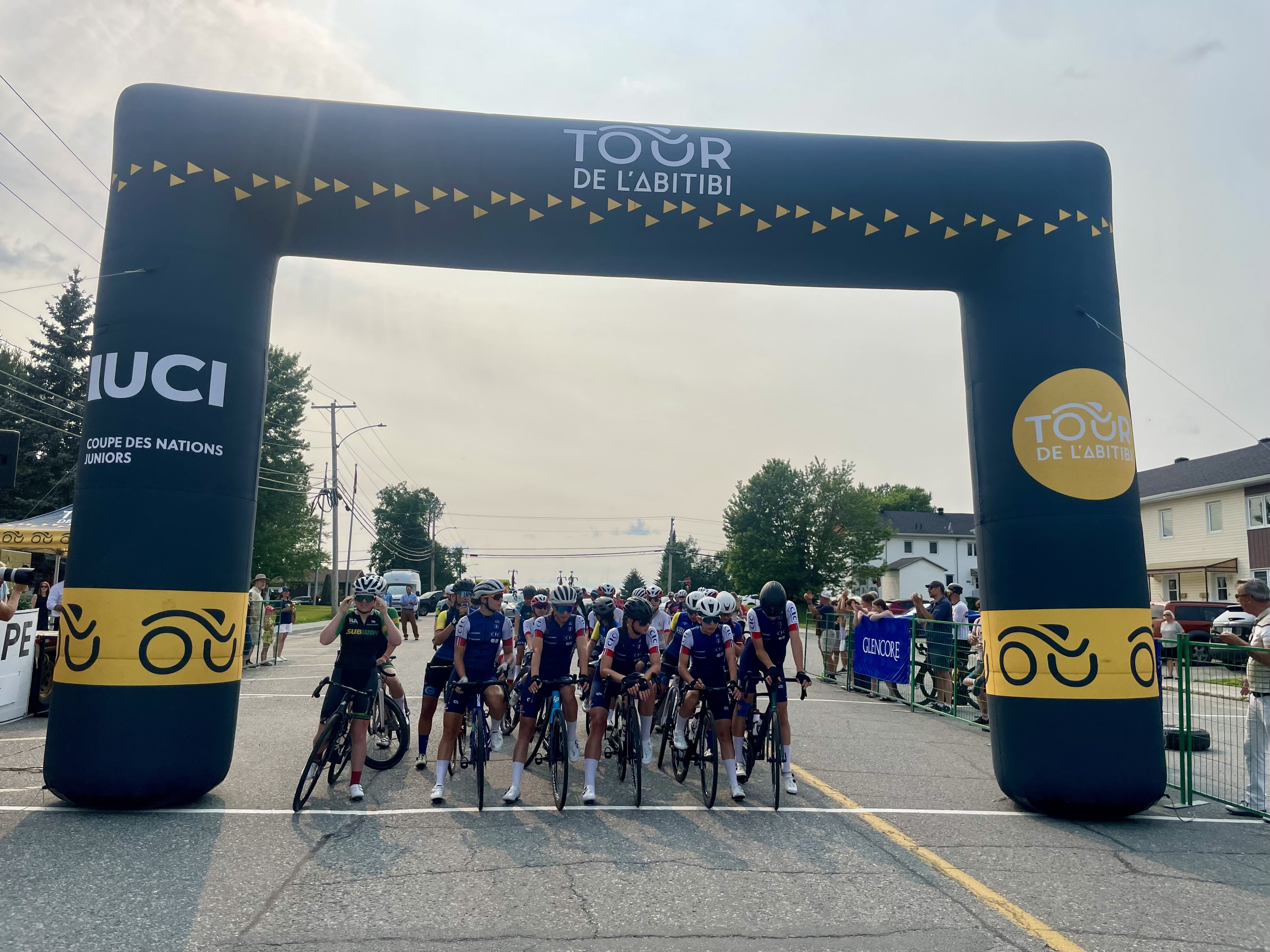

Race details
- Date: July
- Region: Abitibi-Témiscamingue, Quebec, Canada
- Local name: Tour de l'Abitibi (in French)
- Discipline: Road
- Competition: UCI Junior Nations' Cup
- Type: Stage race
- Web site: tourabitibi.com

History
- First edition: 1969
- Editions: 55 (as of 2025)
- First winner: Gérard Rocheleau (CAN)
- Most recent: Gabin Gicquel (FRA)

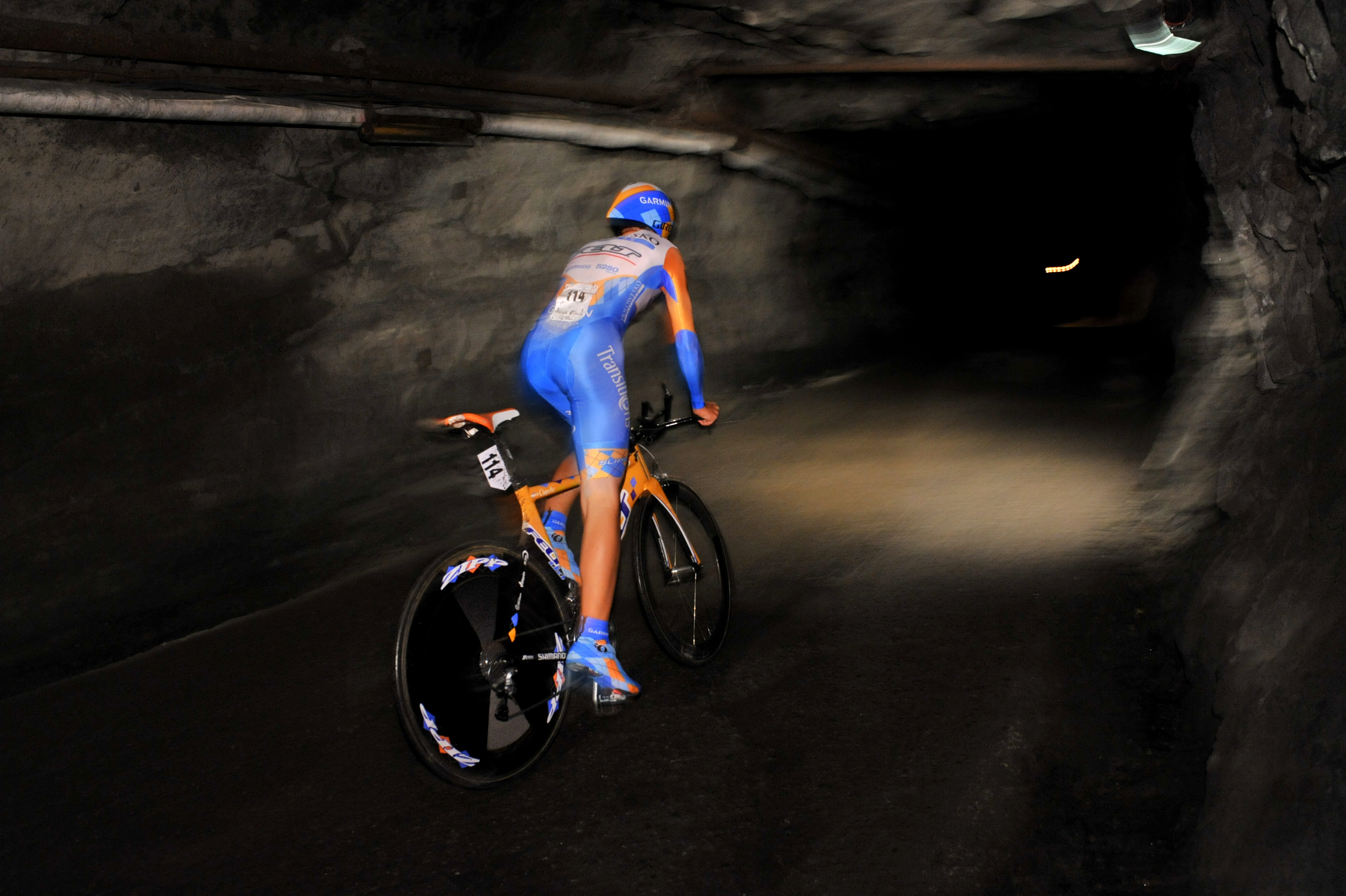
Underground stage of the Tour de l'Abitibi

The Tour de l'Abitibi is a junior bicycle stage race taking place in the Abitibi-Témiscamingue region of Quebec, Canada. The race was first held in 1969 and had only Canadian teams. It has since become an international competition, part of the Junior Nations' Cup (Coupe des Nations Junior) and is currently the only junior-level race in North America sponsored by the Union Cycliste Internationale. A number of renowned cyclists, such as Steve Bauer, Laurent Jalabert, Bobby Julich and Andrew Hampsten, have participated in the Tour before they launched their professional careers.

Since 2000, one stage of the Tour de l'Abitibi takes place in an underground mine of Cité de l'Or, some 300 feet (91 m) below ground. Cyclists must ride through the tunnels and up the access ramp (a 17% slope) before they race through the streets of Val-d'Or.

== Winners ==
Year	Winner	Second	Third
1969	(Canada) Gérard Rocheleau	(Belgium) Robert Van Den Eynde	(Canada) Serge Proulx
1980	(Canada) Alex Stieda		
1981	(France) Bruno Wojtinek	(France) Franck Pineau	
1985	(Netherlands) André van Wijngaarden	(Canada) Chris Koberstein	(Canada) Nathael Sagard
1986	(Netherlands) Michel Zanoli	(France) Laurent Jalabert	(Netherlands) Richard Luppes
1987	(United States) Frank McCormack	(United States) Darren Baker	(France) Jean-Cyril Robin
1988	(United States) Bobby Julich		
1989	(United States) Bobby Julich		
1991	(Slovenia) Gorazd Štangelj		
1992	(Canada) Roland Green		
1993	(Canada) Miles MacDonald		
1994	(Canada) Guillaume Belzile		(Russia) Alexei Kuznetsov
1995	(Canada) Neil Grover	(Russia) Denis Menchov	(Germany) Sven Claussmeyer
1996	(France) David Rolandez		
1997	(United States) Joshua Thornton	(United States) David Zabriskie	(United States) Phil Zajicek
1998	(United States) William Frischkorn	(Germany) Michael Wieczorek	(Netherlands) Bobbie Traksel
1999	(United States) Brad Buccamboso	(South Africa) Alwyn Scheepers	(United States) Sterling Magnell
2000	(Poland) Piotr Mazur	(Netherlands) Koen de Kort	(South Africa) Wesley Cole
2001	(Finland) Jukka Vastaranta	(Netherlands) Niels Scheuneman	(Netherlands) Norbert Poels
2002	(United States) Tyler Farrar	(Canada) Oliver Stiller-Crote	(United States) Craig Wilcox
2003	(Netherlands) Kai Reus	(United States) Matthew Crane	(United States) Steven Cozza
2004	(United States) Christopher Stockburger	(United States) Zachary Bolian	(Belgium) Michael Vanderaerden
2005	(Canada) David Veilleux	(Canada) Eric Boily	(Sweden) Jonas Bjelkmark
2006	(Canada) Mark Hinnen	(Canada) William Goodfellow	(Canada) Guillaume Boivin
2007	(United States) Taylor Phinney	(New Zealand) Tom David	(Canada) Guillaume Blais-Dufour
2008	(France) Arnaud Jouffroy	(United States) Charlie Avis	(Canada) David Boily
2009	(United States) Andrew Barker	(United States) Charlie Avis	(New Zealand) Taylor Gunman
2010	(Australia) Lachlan Morton	(United States) Eamon Lucas	(United States) Zack Noonan
2011	(New Zealand) James Oram	(New Zealand) Dion Smith	(United States) Colby Wait-Molyneux
2012	(United States) Taylor Eisenhart	(United States) Alexey Vermeulen	(United States) Geoffrey Curran
2013	(United States) Brendan Rhim	(Australia) Owen Gillott	(Canada) Olivier Brisebois
2014	(France) Rayane Bouhanni	(United States) Zeke Mostov	(Denmark) Mathias Norsgaard
2015	(United States) Adrien Costa	(United States) Brandon McNulty	(France) Théo Menant
2016	(United States) Brandon McNulty	(Denmark) Mikkel Bjerg	(United States) Kevin Goguen
2017	(United States) Riley Sheehan	(Mexico) Fernando Islas	(Czech Republic) Richard Holec
2018	(United States) Riley Sheehan	(United States) Kendrick Boots	(United States) Michael Garrison
2019	(United States) Michael Garrison	(United States) Matthew Riccitello	(Canada) Lukas Carreau
2020	Cancelled		
2021	Cancelled		
2022	(France) Lucas Mainguenaud	(France) Mathieu Dupé	(France) Mathéo Barusseau
2023	(Canada) Matthew Ney	(Canada) Ethan Powell	(United States) Alejandro Che
2024	(France) Ellande Larronde	(New Zealand) Oliver Scott	(Canada) Ben Morin
2025	(France) Gabin Gicquel	(France) Alban Picard	(Canada) Maxime Bourassa
2026	(Canada) Carter DeVeer	(Kazakhstan) Gleb Novikov	(Canada) Heron Land-Gillis
