= Logan Owen =

American cyclist

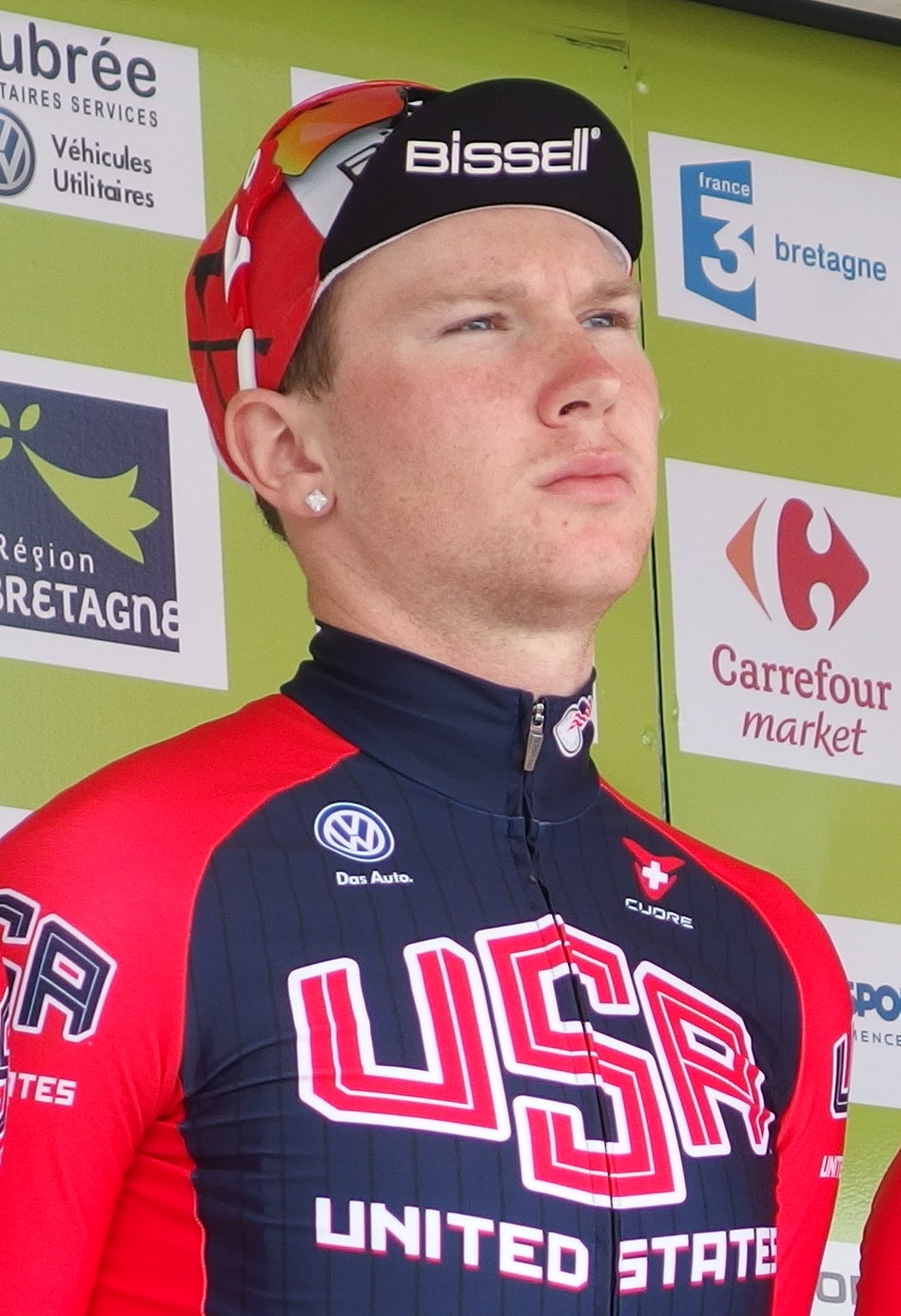
- Owen in April 2014

Personal information
- Born: March 25, 1995 (age 31) Bremerton, Washington, United States

Cycling career
- Sport: Cycling
- Current team: EF Education–EasyPost
- Disciplines: Road; Cyclo-cross
- Role: Rider

Amateur teams
- 2005–2006: Redline
- 2009–2012: Redline

Professional teams
- 2013: California Giant Berry Farms
- 2014–2017: Bissell Development Team
- 2018–2021: EF Education First–Drapac p/b Cannondale
Medal record
Men's track cycling
Representing United States
Pan American Championships
Silver medal – second place	2017 Couva	Team pursuit

Logan Owen (born March 25, 1995) is an American professional racing cyclist. Owen formerly rode for UCI WorldTeam EF Education–EasyPost. He won a stage of the 2015 Larry H. Miller Tour of Utah on the road. In August 2019, he was named in the startlist for the 2019 Vuelta a España.

== Career ==
=== Junior career ===
At the age of five, Owen began testing Redline's new titanium BMX frame.

=== Bissell Development Team (2014–17) ===
Owen joined the then-Bissell Development Team, run by Axel Merckx, for the 2014 season.

In 2016, Owen won the U23 Liège–Bastogne–Liège coming out of a long distance breakaway, ultimately crossing the line alone.

=== EF Education First–Drapac (2018–present) ===
In September 2017, it was announced that Owen would join EF Education First–Drapac p/b Cannondale for the 2018 season.

== Personal life ==
Owen was married to fellow professional cyclist, Chloé Dygert. However, the marriage ended in divorce in January 2020.

== Major results ==
=== Cyclo-cross ===
2011–2012

1st National Junior Championships
2012–2013
1st National Junior Championships
1st Cyclo-cross Namur (junior)
2013–2014
1st National Under-23 Championships
2014–2015
1st National Under-23 Championships
2nd Pan-American Championships

=== Road ===
2013
1st Road race, National Junior Road Championships
1st National Junior Criterium Championships
2nd Overall Course de la Paix Juniors
4th Road race, UCI Junior Road World Championships
2014
8th Paris–Roubaix Espoirs
2015
1st Stage 3 Tour of Utah
2016
1st Liège–Bastogne–Liège Espoirs
2017
6th Overall Volta ao Alentejo

1st Stage 4

2019
9th Hammer Stavanger

=== Grand Tour general classification results timeline ===
Grand Tour	2019	2020
Giro d'Italia	—	—
Tour de France	—	—
Vuelta a España	126	105

Legend
—	Did not compete
DNF	Did not finish
