= Hincapie–Leomo p/b BMC =

American cycling team

Team information
- UCI code: HLB
- Registered: United States
- Founded: 2012
- Disbanded: 2020
- Discipline: Road
- Status: UCI Continental (2012–2017, 2019–2020); UCI Professional Continental (2018)
- Bicycles: BMC

Key personnel
- General manager: Rich Hincapie
- Team manager: Thomas Craven

Team name history
- 2012 2013–2014 2015 2016–2017 2018 2019 2020: BMC–Hincapie Sportswear Development Team; Hincapie Sportswear Development Team; Hincapie Racing Team; Holowesko Citadel Racing Team p/b Hincapie Sportswear; Holowesko–Citadel p/b Arapahoe Resources; Arapahoe Resources–BMC; Hincapie–Leomo p/b BMC

Hincapie–Leomo p/b BMC (UCI team code: HLB) was an American cycling team focusing on road bicycle racing. The team was developed by former professional racing cyclist George Hincapie, and was managed by Rich Hincapie with assistance from directeur sportif Thomas Craven. The team was founded as a junior development team known as Hincapie–Holowesko Partners. It joined the UCI Continental Tour in partnership with UCI ProTour team BMC Racing Team in 2012. Riders who have gone on to compete for UCI WorldTeams and Professional Continental teams include Tanner Putt, Tyler Magner, Joey Rosskopf and Dion Smith.

In November 2017, the team was promoted to UCI Professional Continental status in time for the 2018 season.

The team disbanded at the end of the 2020 season.

== Team roster ==
As of April 3, 2020.

| Rider | Date of birth |
|---|---|
| Cameron Beard (USA) | August 1, 1998 (age 28) |
| Dario Giovine (ITA) | March 11, 1992 (age 34) |
| Noah Granigan (USA) | January 18, 1996 (age 30) |
| Richard Holec (CZE) | January 23, 1999 (age 27) |
| Yuki Ishihara (JPN) | April 5, 1997 (age 29) |
| Sam Janisch (USA) | April 10, 2000 (age 26) |
| Seth Jones (USA) | August 4, 2000 (age 26) |

| Rider | Date of birth |
|---|---|
| Simon Jones (USA) | August 24, 1999 (age 27) |
| Yusuke Kadota (JPN) | August 18, 1998 (age 28) |
| Tomoya Koyama (JPN) | July 18, 1998 (age 28) |
| Spencer Petrov (USA) | September 9, 1998 (age 27) |
| Brendan Rhim (USA) | December 19, 1995 (age 30) |
| Pablo Torres (ESP) | November 28, 1987 (age 38) |

== Major wins ==
2012
Stage 8a Vuelta a la Independencia Nacional, Tanner Putt
Stage 6 Tour of China I, Tyler Magner
Stage 5 Tour of China II, Oscar Clark
2013
Stage 5 Flèche du Sud, Oscar Clark
Overall, Paris–Arras Tour, Joey Rosskopf

Stage 1, Joey Rosskopf

Stage 4 Tour de Beauce, Joey Rosskopf
2014
Overall Tour de Beauce, Toms Skujiņš

Stages 2 & 5, Toms Skujiņš

Stage 2 USA Pro Cycling Challenge, Robin Carpenter
2015
Stage 3 Tour of California, Toms Skujiņš
Overall UCI America Tour, Toms Skujiņš
Winston-Salem Cycling Classic, Toms Skujiņš
Team NRC United States
Individual NRC USA, Toms Skujiņš
2016
Stage 4 Joe Martin Stage Race, Travis McCabe
Stage 2 Tour of Utah, Robin Carpenter
2017
Overall Joe Martin Stage Race, Robin Carpenter

Stage 4, Robin Carpenter

Overall Tour de Beauce, Andžs Flaksis
Winston-Salem Cycling Classic, Robin Carpenter
White Spot / Delta Road Race, John Murphy
Overall Cascade Cycling Classic, Robin Carpenter
Stage 1 Tour of Utah, Tyler Magner
Stage 4 Tour of Utah, John Murphy
Stage 1 Colorado Classic, John Murphy
2018
Stage 1 Tour de Normandie, Fabian Lienhard
Stage 1 Circuit des Ardennes, John Murphy
Overall Joe Martin Stage Race, Rubén Companioni

Stage 1, Rubén Companioni
Stage 3, Brendan Rhim
