= 2019 Tour de Langkawi =

Malaysian cycling race

2019 UCI Asia Tour

Race details
- Dates: 6 April – 13 April 2019
- Stages: 8
- Distance: 1,227.5 km (762.7 mi)
- Winning time: 29h 15' 53"

Results
Jersey awarded to the overall winner	Winner	Benjamin Dyball (AUS)	(Team Sapura Cycling)
	Second	Keegan Swirbul (USA)	(Floyd's Pro Cycling)
	Third	Vadim Pronskiy (KAZ)	(Vino–Astana Motors)
Jersey awarded to the points classification winner	Points	Travis McCabe (USA)	(Floyd's Pro Cycling)
Jersey awarded to the mountains classification winner	Mountains	Angus Lyons (AUS)	(Oliver's Real Food Racing)
	Team	(Canada) Floyd's Pro Cycling	

The 2019 Tour de Langkawi (officially Petronas Le Tour de Langkawi 2019 for sponsorship reasons) was the 24th edition of the Tour de Langkawi road cycling stage race. It is part of the 2019 UCI Asia Tour. It began on the 6th of April in Kuala Lumpur and finished on the 13th of April in Kuah.

== Teams ==
Four UCI Professional Continental teams, sixteen UCI Continental teams and two national teams make up the twenty-two teams that participated in the race.

UCI WorldTeams

No WorldTeams were invited.

UCI Professional Continental Teams

- Androni Giocattoli–Sidermec
- Gazprom–RusVelo
- Neri Sottoli–Selle Italia–KTM
- Bardiani–CSF

UCI Continental Teams

- Floyd's Pro Cycling
- Team Sapura Cycling
- Terengganu Inc. TSG
- Oliver's Real Food Racing
- Vino–Astana Motors
- St George Continental Cycling Team
- Team Ukyo
- Interpro Cycling Academy
- Brunei Continental Cycling Team
- Pro Racing Sunshine Coast
- ProTouch
- St George Continental Cycling Team
- Mitchelton–BikeExchange
- KSPO Bianchi Asia
- Customs Cycling Team
- Giant Cycling Team
- Shenzhen Xidesheng Cycling Team

National Teams

- Malaysia
- Japan

== Route ==
Stage characteristics and winners
Stage	Date	Course	Distance	Type	Stage winner
1	6 April	Kuala Lumpur to Tampin	176.9 km (109.9 mi)	Medium-mountain stage	Marcus Culey (AUS)
2	7 April	Senawang to Melaka	200.6 km (124.6 mi)	Medium-mountain stage	Mohd Harrif Saleh (MAS)
3	8 April	Muar to Putrajaya	192.6 km (119.7 mi)	Flat stage	Travis McCabe (USA)
4	9 April	Shah Alam to Genting Highlands	114.2 km (71.0 mi)	Mountain stage	Benjamin Dyball (AUS)
5	10 April	Tanjung Malim to Taiping	200.1 km (124.3 mi)	Flat stage	Matteo Pelucchi (ITA)
6	11 April	Bagan to Alor Setar	130.8 km (81.3 mi)	Flat stage	Matteo Pelucchi (ITA)
7	12 April	Pantai Cenang, Langkawi to Pantai Cenang, Langkawi	106.8 km (66.4 mi)	Flat stage	Simone Bevilacqua (ITA)
8	13 April	Dataran Lang to Kuah	103.8 km (64.5 mi)	Flat stage	Marco Benfatto (ITA)
Total			1,227.5 km (762.7 mi)		

== Stages ==
=== Stage 1 ===
6 April 2019 — Kuala Lumpur to Tampin, 176.9 km (109.9 mi)

Stage 1 Result
Rank	Rider	Team	Time
1	Marcus Culey (AUS)	Team Sapura Cycling	4h 20' 40"
2	Travis McCabe (USA)	Floyd's Pro Cycling	+ 5"
3	Clint Hendricks (AUS)	ProTouch	+ 5"
4	Moreno Marchetti (ITA)	Neri Sottoli–Selle Italia–KTM	+ 5"
5	Michael Freiberg (AUS)	Pro Racing Sunshine Coast	+ 5"
6	Paolo Simion (ITA)	Bardiani–CSF	+ 5"
7	Matthew Zenovich (NZL)	St George Continental Cycling Team	+ 5"
8	Nikolay Cherkasov (RUS)	Gazprom–RusVelo	+ 5"
9	Vladislav Kulikov (RUS)	Gazprom–RusVelo	+ 5"
10	Grigoriy Shtein (KAZ)	Vino–Astana Motors	+ 5"

General classification after Stage 1
Rank	Rider	Team	Time
1	Marcus Culey (AUS)	Team Sapura Cycling	4h 20' 27"
2	Brendon Davids (RSA)	Oliver's Real Food Racing	+ 9"
3	Travis McCabe (USA)	Floyd's Pro Cycling	+ 12"
4	Clint Hendricks (AUS)	ProTouch	+ 14"
5	Moreno Marchetti (ITA)	Neri Sottoli–Selle Italia–KTM	+ 18"
6	Michael Freiberg (AUS)	Pro Racing Sunshine Coast	+ 18"
7	Paolo Simion (ITA)	Bardiani–CSF	+ 18"
8	Matthew Zenovich (NZL)	St George Continental Cycling Team	+ 18"
9	Nikolay Cherkasov (RUS)	Gazprom–RusVelo	+ 18"
10	Vladislav Kulikov (RUS)	Gazprom–RusVelo	+ 18"

=== Stage 2 ===
7 April 2019 — Senawang to Melaka, 200.6 km (124.6 mi)

Stage 2 Result
Rank	Rider	Team	Time
1	Mohd Harrif Saleh (MAS)	Terengganu Inc. TSG	4h 53' 20"
2	Andrea Guardini (ITA)	Bardiani–CSF	+ 0"
3	Kazushige Kuboki (JPN)	Japan	+ 0"
4	Marco Benfatto (ITA)	Androni Giocattoli–Sidermec	+ 0"
5	Chen Zhiwen (CHN)	Giant Cycling Team	+ 0"
6	Mamyr Stash (RUS)	Gazprom–RusVelo	+ 0"
7	Paolo Simion (ITA)	Bardiani–CSF	+ 0"
8	Andriy Kulyk (UKR)	Shenzhen Xidesheng Cycling Team	+ 0"
9	Blake Quick (AUS)	St George Continental Cycling Team	+ 0"
10	Jayde Julius (RSA)	ProTouch	+ 0"

General classification after Stage 2
Rank	Rider	Team	Time
1	Marcus Culey (AUS)	Team Sapura Cycling	9h 13' 47"
2	Brendon Davids (RSA)	Oliver's Real Food Racing	+ 9"
3	Travis McCabe (USA)	Floyd's Pro Cycling	+ 12"
4	Michael Freiberg (AUS)	Pro Racing Sunshine Coast	+ 13"
5	Clint Hendricks (AUS)	ProTouch	+ 14"
6	Kim Ji-Hun (KOR)	KSPO Bianchi Asia	+ 16"
7	Paolo Simion (ITA)	Bardiani–CSF	+ 18"
8	Moreno Marchetti (ITA)	Neri Sottoli–Selle Italia–KTM	+ 18"
9	Jayde Julius (RSA)	St George Continental Cycling Team	+ 18"
10	Alistair Donohoe (AUS)	ProTouch	+ 18"

=== Stage 3 ===
8 April 2019 — Muar to Putrajaya, 192.6 km (119.7 mi)

Stage 3 Result
Rank	Rider	Team	Time
1	Travis McCabe (USA)	Floyd's Pro Cycling	4h 49' 39"
2	Matteo Pelucchi (ITA)	Androni Giocattoli–Sidermec	+ 2"
3	Andrea Guardini (ITA)	Bardiani–CSF	+ 2"
4	Mohd Harrif Saleh (MAS)	Terengganu Inc. TSG	+ 2"
5	Kazushige Kuboki (JPN)	Japan	+ 2"
6	Chen Zhiwen (CHN)	Giant Cycling Team	+ 2"
7	Maris Bogdanovics (LAT)	Interpro Cycling Academy	+ 2"
8	Andriy Kulyk (UKR)	Shenzhen Xidesheng Cycling Team	+ 2"
9	Blake Quick (AUS)	St George Continental Cycling Team	+ 2"
10	Michael Freiberg (AUS)	Pro Racing Sunshine Coast	+ 2"

General classification after Stage 3
Rank	Rider	Team	Time
1	Travis McCabe (USA)	Floyd's Pro Cycling	14h 03' 28"
2	Marcus Culey (AUS)	Team Sapura Cycling	+ 4"
3	Michael Freiberg (AUS)	Pro Racing Sunshine Coast	+ 13"
4	Sofian Nabil Mohd Bakri (MAS)	Malaysia	+ 13"
5	Brendon Davids (RSA)	Oliver's Real Food Racing	+ 13"
6	Clint Hendricks (AUS)	ProTouch	+ 14"
7	Paolo Simion (ITA)	Bardiani–CSF	+ 18"
8	Jayde Julius (RSA)	St George Continental Cycling Team	+ 18"
9	Nikolay Cherkasov (RUS)	Gazprom–RusVelo	+ 18"
10	Robbie Hucker (AUS)	Team Ukyo	+ 18"

=== Stage 4 ===
9 April 2019 — Shah Alam to Genting Highlands, 114.2 km (71.0 mi)

Stage 4 Result
Rank	Rider	Team	Time
1	Benjamin Dyball (AUS)	Team Sapura Cycling	3h 22' 2"
2	Hernán Ricardo Aguirre (COL)	Interpro Cycling Academy	+ 23"
3	Keegan Swirbul (USA)	Floyd's Pro Cycling	+ 44"
4	Vadim Pronskiy (KAZ)	Vino–Astana Motors	+ 59"
5	Nariyuki Masuda (JPN)	Japan	+ 1' 19"
6	Nikolay Cherkasov (RUS)	Gazprom–RusVelo	+ 1' 34"
7	Sam Crome (AUS)	Team Ukyo	+ 1' 56"
8	Luca Raggio (ITA)	Neri Sottoli–Selle Italia–KTM	+ 2' 11"
9	Alessandro Bisolti (ITA)	Androni Giocattoli–Sidermec	+ 2' 18"
10	Freddy Ovett (AUS)	Pro Racing Sunshine Coast	+ 2' 21"

General classification after Stage 4
Rank	Rider	Team	Time
1	Benjamin Dyball (AUS)	Team Sapura Cycling	17h 25' 42"
2	Hernán Ricardo Aguirre (COL)	Interpro Cycling Academy	+ 27"
3	Keegan Swirbul (USA)	Floyd's Pro Cycling	+ 50"
4	Vadim Pronskiy (KAZ)	Vino–Astana Motors	+ 1' 05"
5	Nariyuki Masuda (JPN)	Japan	+ 1' 29"
6	Nikolay Cherkasov (RUS)	Gazprom–RusVelo	+ 1' 40"
7	Sam Crome (AUS)	Team Ukyo	+ 2' 06"
8	Alessandro Bisolti (ITA)	Androni Giocattoli–Sidermec	+ 2' 28"
9	Freddy Ovett (AUS)	Pro Racing Sunshine Coast	+ 2' 31"
10	Serghei Tvetcov (ROM)	Floyd's Pro Cycling	+ 2' 42"

=== Stage 5 ===
10 April 2019 — Tanjung Malim to Taiping, 200.1 km (124.3 mi)

Stage 5 Result
Rank	Rider	Team	Time
1	Matteo Pelucchi (ITA)	Androni Giocattoli–Sidermec	4h 27' 11"
2	Blake Quick (AUS)	St George Continental Cycling Team	+ 0"
3	Travis McCabe (USA)	Floyd's Pro Cycling	+ 0"
4	Mohd Harrif Saleh (MAS)	Terengganu Inc. TSG	+ 0"
5	Michael Bresciani (ITA)	Bardiani–CSF	+ 0"
6	Maris Bogdanovics (LVA)	Interpro Cycling Academy	+ 0"
7	Clint Hendricks (RSA)	ProTouch	+ 0"
8	Grigoriy Shtein (KAZ)	Vino–Astana Motors	+ 0"
9	Craig Wiggins (AUS)	St George Continental Cycling Team	+ 0"
10	Jayde Julius (RSA)	ProTouch	+ 0"

General classification after Stage 5
Rank	Rider	Team	Time
1	Benjamin Dyball (AUS)	Team Sapura Cycling	21h 52' 53"
2	Hernán Ricardo Aguirre (COL)	Interpro Cycling Academy	+ 27"
3	Keegan Swirbul (USA)	Floyd's Pro Cycling	+ 50"
4	Vadim Pronskiy (KAZ)	Vino–Astana Motors	+ 1' 05"
5	Nariyuki Masuda (JPN)	Japan	+ 1' 29"
6	Nikolay Cherkasov (RUS)	Gazprom–RusVelo	+ 1' 40"
7	Sam Crome (AUS)	Team Ukyo	+ 2' 06"
8	Alessandro Bisolti (ITA)	Androni Giocattoli–Sidermec	+ 2' 28"
9	Freddy Ovett (AUS)	Pro Racing Sunshine Coast	+ 2' 31"
10	Travis McCabe (USA)	Floyd's Pro Cycling	+ 2' 38"

=== Stage 6 ===
11 April 2019 — Bagan to Alor Setar, 130.8 km (81.3 mi)

Stage 6 Result
Rank	Rider	Team	Time
1	Matteo Pelucchi (ITA)	Androni Giocattoli–Sidermec	2h 47' 19"
2	Youcef Reguigui (ALG)	Terengganu Inc. TSG	+ 0"
3	Mohd Harrif Saleh (MAS)	Terengganu Inc. TSG	+ 0"
4	Craig Wiggins (AUS)	St George Continental Cycling Team	+ 0"
5	Travis McCabe (USA)	Floyd's Pro Cycling	+ 0"
6	Maris Bogdanovics (LVA)	Interpro Cycling Academy	+ 0"
7	Marco Benfatto (ITA)	Androni Giocattoli–Sidermec	+ 0"
8	Andriy Kulyk (UKR)	Shenzhen Xidesheng Cycling Team	+ 0"
9	Calvin Beneke (RSA)	ProTouch	+ 0"
10	Kazushige Kuboki (JPN)	Japan	+ 0"

General classification after Stage 6
Rank	Rider	Team	Time
1	Benjamin Dyball (AUS)	Team Sapura Cycling	24h 40' 12"
2	Hernán Ricardo Aguirre (COL)	Interpro Cycling Academy	+ 27"
3	Keegan Swirbul (USA)	Floyd's Pro Cycling	+ 50"
4	Vadim Pronskiy (KAZ)	Vino–Astana Motors	+ 1' 05"
5	Nariyuki Masuda (JPN)	Japan	+ 1' 29"
6	Nikolay Cherkasov (RUS)	Gazprom–RusVelo	+ 1' 40"
7	Sam Crome (AUS)	Team Ukyo	+ 2' 06"
8	Alessandro Bisolti (ITA)	Androni Giocattoli–Sidermec	+ 2' 28"
9	Freddy Ovett (AUS)	Pro Racing Sunshine Coast	+ 2' 31"
10	Travis McCabe (USA)	Floyd's Pro Cycling	+ 2' 36"

=== Stage 7 ===
12 April 2019 — Pantai Cenang, Langkawi to Pantai Cenang, Langkawi, 106.8 km (66.4 mi)

Stage 7 Result
Rank	Rider	Team	Time
1	Simone Bevilacqua (ITA)	Neri Sottoli–Selle Italia–KTM	2h 47' 19""
2	Charalampos Kastrantas (GRE)	Brunei Continental Cycling Team	+ 0"
3	Craig Wiggins (AUS)	St George Continental Cycling Team	+ 0"
4	Michael Bresciani (ITA)	Bardiani–CSF	+ 0"
5	Matteo Pelucchi (ITA)	Androni Giocattoli–Sidermec	+ 0"
6	Maris Bogdanovics (LVA)	Interpro Cycling Academy	+ 0"
7	Youcef Reguigui (ALG)	Terengganu Inc. TSG	+ 0"
8	Travis McCabe (USA)	Floyd's Pro Cycling	+ 0"
9	Mohd Harrif Saleh (MAS)	Terengganu Inc. TSG	+ 0"
10	Mamyr Stash (RUS)	Gazprom–RusVelo	+ 0"

General classification after Stage 7
Rank	Rider	Team	Time
1	Benjamin Dyball (AUS)	Team Sapura Cycling	26h 58' 11"
2	Keegan Swirbul (USA)	Floyd's Pro Cycling	+ 50"
3	Vadim Pronskiy (KAZ)	Vino–Astana Motors	+ 1' 05"
4	Hernán Ricardo Aguirre (COL)	Interpro Cycling Academy	+ 1' 07"
5	Nariyuki Masuda (JPN)	Japan	+ 1' 29"
6	Nikolay Cherkasov (RUS)	Gazprom–RusVelo	+ 1' 40"
7	Sam Crome (AUS)	Team Ukyo	+ 2' 06"
8	Alessandro Bisolti (ITA)	Androni Giocattoli–Sidermec	+ 2' 27"
9	Freddy Ovett (AUS)	Pro Racing Sunshine Coast	+ 2' 31"
10	Travis McCabe (USA)	Floyd's Pro Cycling	+ 2' 36"

=== Stage 8 ===
13 April 2019 — Dataran Lang, Langkawi to Kuah, Langkawi, 103.8 km (64.5 mi)

Stage 8 Result
Rank	Rider	Team	Time
1	Marco Benfatto (ITA)	Androni Giocattoli–Sidermec	2h 17' 42""
2	Blake Quick (AUS)	St George Continental Cycling Team	+ 0"
3	Matteo Pelucchi (ITA)	Androni Giocattoli–Sidermec	+ 0"
4	Youcef Reguigui (ALG)	Terengganu Inc. TSG	+ 0"
5	Travis McCabe (USA)	Floyd's Pro Cycling	+ 0"
6	Charalampos Kastrantas (GRE)	Brunei Continental Cycling Team	+ 0"
7	Umberto Marengo (ITA)	Neri Sottoli–Selle Italia–KTM	+ 0"
8	Chen Zhiwen (CHN)	Giant Cycling Team	+ 0"
9	Mamyr Stash (RUS)	Gazprom–RusVelo	+ 0"
10	Jonathon Noble (AUS)	Pro Racing Sunshine Coast	+ 0"

General classification after Stage 8
Rank	Rider	Team	Time
1	Benjamin Dyball (AUS)	Team Sapura Cycling	29h 15' 53"
2	Keegan Swirbul (USA)	Floyd's Pro Cycling	+ 50"
3	Vadim Pronskiy (KAZ)	Vino–Astana Motors	+ 1' 05"
4	Hernán Ricardo Aguirre (COL)	Interpro Cycling Academy	+ 1' 07"
5	Nariyuki Masuda (JPN)	Japan	+ 1' 29"
6	Nikolay Cherkasov (RUS)	Gazprom–RusVelo	+ 1' 40"
7	Sam Crome (AUS)	Team Ukyo	+ 2' 06"
8	Alessandro Bisolti (ITA)	Androni Giocattoli–Sidermec	+ 2' 27"
9	Freddy Ovett (AUS)	Pro Racing Sunshine Coast	+ 2' 31"
10	Travis McCabe (USA)	Floyd's Pro Cycling	+ 2' 36"

== Classification leadership table ==
Classification leadership by stage
Stage	Winner	General classification	Points classification	Mountains classification	Asian rider classification	Team classification
1	Marcus Culey	Marcus Culey	Marcus Culey	Angus Lyons	Grigoriy Shtein	Team Sapura Cycling
2	Mohd Harrif Saleh	Marcus Culey	Marcus Culey	Angus Lyons	Kim Ji-Hun	Team Sapura Cycling
3	Travis McCabe	Travis McCabe	Travis McCabe	Angus Lyons	Sofian Nabil Mohd Bakri	ProTouch
4	Benjamin Dyball	Benjamin Dyball	Travis McCabe	Angus Lyons	Vadim Pronskiy	Floyd's Pro Cycling
5	Matteo Pelucchi	Benjamin Dyball	Travis McCabe	Angus Lyons	Vadim Pronskiy	Floyd's Pro Cycling
6	Matteo Pelucchi	Benjamin Dyball	Travis McCabe	Angus Lyons	Vadim Pronskiy	Floyd's Pro Cycling
7	Simone Bevilacqua	Benjamin Dyball	Travis McCabe	Angus Lyons	Vadim Pronskiy	Floyd's Pro Cycling
8	Marco Benfatto	Benjamin Dyball	Travis McCabe	Angus Lyons	Vadim Pronskiy	Floyd's Pro Cycling
Final		Benjamin Dyball	Travis McCabe	Angus Lyons	Vadim Pronskiy	Floyd's Pro Cycling

== Classification standings ==
Legend
Denotes the winner of the general classification	Denotes the winner of the mountains classification
Denotes the winner of the points classification	Denotes the winner of the Asian rider classification

=== General classification ===
Final general classification (1–10)
Rank	Rider	Team	Time
1	Benjamin Dyball (AUS)	Team Sapura Cycling	29h 15' 53"
2	Keegan Swirbul (USA)	Floyd's Pro Cycling	+ 50"
3	Vadim Pronskiy (KAZ)	Vino–Astana Motors	+ 1' 05"
4	Hernán Aguirre (COL)	Interpro Cycling Academy	+ 1' 07"
5	Nariyuki Masuda (JAP)	Japan	+ 1' 29"
6	Nikolay Cherkasov (RUS)	Gazprom–RusVelo	+ 1' 40"
7	Sam Crome (AUS)	Team Ukyo	+ 2' 06"
8	Alessandro Bisolti (ITA)	Androni Giocattoli–Sidermec	+ 2' 27"
9	Freddy Ovett (AUS)	Pro Racing Sunshine Coast	+ 2' 31"
10	Travis McCabe (USA)	Floyd's Pro Cycling	+ 2' 36"

=== Points classification ===
Final points classification (1–10)
Rank	Rider	Team	Points
1	Travis McCabe (USA)	Floyd's Pro Cycling	91
2	Matteo Pelucchi (ITA)	Androni Giocattoli–Sidermec	68
3	Mohd Harrif Saleh (MAS)	Terengganu Inc. TSG	62
4	Marco Benfatto (ITA)	Androni Giocattoli–Sidermec	54
5	Blake Quick (AUS)	St George Continental Cycling Team	42
6	Maris Bogdanovics (LAT)	Interpro Cycling Academy	42
7	Youcef Reguigui (ALG)	Terengganu Inc. TSG	40
8	Clint Hendricks (RSA)	ProTouch	35
9	Paolo Simion (ITA)	Bardiani–CSF	33
10	Craig Wiggins (AUS)	St George Continental Cycling Team	32

=== Mountains classification ===
Final mountains classification (1–10)
Rank	Rider	Team	Points
1	Angus Lyons (AUS)	Oliver's Real Food Racing	59
2	Kwon Soon Young (KOR)	KSPO Bianchi Asia	27
3	Benjamin Dyball (AUS)	Team Sapura Cycling	25
4	Hernán Ricardo Aguirre (COL)	Interpro Cycling Academy	22
5	Marcus Culey (AUS)	Team Sapura Cycling	18
6	Keegan Swirbul (USA)	Floyd's Pro Cycling	16
7	Nik Mohamad Azman Zulkifli (MAS)	Malaysia	12
8	Vadim Pronskiy (KAZ)	Vino–Astana Motors	12
9	Daniel Savini (ITA)	Bardiani–CSF	10
10	Nariyuki Masuda (JPN)	Japan	10

=== Asian rider classification ===
Final Asian rider classification (1–10)
Rank	Rider	Team	Time
1	Vadim Pronskiy (KAZ)	Vino–Astana Motors	29h 16' 58"
2	Nariyuki Masuda (JPN)	Japan	+ 24"
3	Stepan Astafyev (KAZ)	Vino–Astana Motors	+ 3' 33"
4	Muhamad Zawawi Azman (MAS)	Team Sapura Cycling	+ 4' 43"
5	Grigoriy Shtein (KAZ)	Vino–Astana Motors	+ 4' 55"
6	Li Jinsong (CHN)	Giant Cycling Team	+ 6' 22"
7	Nik Mohamad Azman Zulkifli (MAS)	Malaysia	+ 7' 02"
8	Yuma Koishi (JPN)	Team Ukyo	+ 8' 00"
9	Muhamad Nur Aiman Mohd Zariff (MAS)	Team Sapura Cycling	+ 9' 16"
10	Mohamad Esmail Chaichi Raghimi (IRN)	Customs Cycling Team	+ 10' 22"

=== Team classification ===
Final team classification (1–10)
Rank	Team	Time
1	(Canada) Floyd's Pro Cycling	87h 54' 20"
2	(Malaysia) Team Sapura Cycling	+ 1' 08"
3	(Kazakhstan) Vino–Astana Motors	+ 4' 59"
4	(Japan) Team Ukyo	+ 6' 04"
5	(Australia) Pro Racing Sunshine Coast	+ 15' 49"
6	(Australia) St George Continental Cycling Team	+ 17' 54"
7	(South Africa) ProTouch	+ 18' 17"
8	(Russia) Gazprom–RusVelo	+ 24' 02"
9	(Malaysia) Terengganu Inc. TSG	+ 27' 18"
10	(Italy) Bardiani–CSF	+ 30' 45"

=== Riders who failed to finish ===
18 riders failed to finish the race.
Rider	Team
Yin Xiao Lei (CHN)	Shenzhen Xidesheng Cycling Team
Yu Ze (CHN)	Shenzhen Xidesheng Cycling Team
Raymond Kreder (NED)	Team Ukyo
Hao Ran (CHN)	Mitchelton–BikeExchange
Bi Wenhui (CHN)	Mitchelton–BikeExchange
Heksa Priya Prasetya (IDN)	Customs Cycling Team
Bernard Van Aert (IDN)	Brunei Continental Cycling Team
Lee Yongchan (KOR)	KSPO Bianchi Asia
Kyohei Mizuno (JPN)	Interpro Cycling Academy
Moreno Marchetti (ITA)	Neri Sottoli–Selle Italia–KTM
Josip Rumac (CRO)	Androni Giocattoli–Sidermec
Azli Najmi Zulkefli (MAS)	Malaysia
Ilya Davidenok (KAZ)	Shenzhen Xidesheng Cycling Team
Mykhaylo Kononenko (UKR)	Shenzhen Xidesheng Cycling Team
Kim Ji-hun (KOR) (Note: Outside time limit.)	KSPO Bianchi Asia
Gleb Brussenskiy (KAZ) (Note: Outside time limit.)	Vino–Astana Motors
Liu Hao (CHN)	Shenzhen Xidesheng Cycling Team
Andrea Guardini (ITA)	Bardiani–CSF
