= 2019 UCI Asia Tour =

- Fifteenth edition of the UCI Asia Tour

Details
- Dates: 23 October 2018–20 October 2019
- Location: Asia
- Races: 16

The 2019 UCI Asia Tour was the 15th season of the UCI Asia Tour. The season began on 23 October 2018 with the Tour of Hainan and ended on 20 October 2019.

The points leader, based on the cumulative results of previous races, wears the UCI Asia Tour cycling jersey.

Throughout the season, points are awarded to the top finishers of stages within stage races and the final general classification standings of each of the stages races and one-day events. The quality and complexity of a race also determines how many points are awarded to the top finishers, the higher the UCI rating of a race, the more points are awarded.

The UCI ratings from highest to lowest are as follows:

- Multi-day events: 2.HC, 2.1 and 2.2
- One-day events: 1.HC, 1.1 and 1.2

== Events ==
=== 2018 ===
Date	Race Name	Location	UCI Rating	Winner	Team	Ref
23–31 October	Tour of Hainan	China	2.HC	Fausto Masnada (ITA)	Androni Giocattoli–Sidermec	
4–11 November	Tour de Singkarak	Indonesia	2.2	Jesse Ewart (AUS)	Team Sapura Cycling	
9–11 November	Tour of Quanzhou Bay	China	2.2	Max Stedman (GBR)	Canyon Eisberg	
11 November	Tour de Okinawa	Japan	1.2	Alan Marangoni (ITA)	Nippo–Vini Fantini–Europa Ovini	
14–18 November	Tour of Fuzhou	China	2.1	Ilya Davidenok (KAZ)	Beijing XDS–Innova Cycling Team	

=== 2019 ===
Date	Race Name	Location	UCI Rating	Winner	Team	Ref
8–12 February	Ronda Pilipinas	Philippines	2.2	Francisco Mancebo (ESP)	Matrix Powertag	
16–21 February	Tour of Oman	Oman	2.HC	Alexey Lutsenko (KAZ)	Astana	
17–21 March	Tour de Taiwan	Taiwan	2.1	Jonathan Clarke (AUS)	Floyd's Pro Cycling	
22–24 March	Tour de Tochigi	Japan	2.2	Raymond Kreder (NED)	Team Ukyo	
1–6 April	Tour of Thailand	Thailand	2.1	Ryan Cavanagh (AUS)	St George Continental Cycling Team	
6–13 April	Tour de Langkawi	Malaysia	2.HC	Ben Dyball (AUS)	Team Sapura Cycling	
17–19 April	Tour de Iskandar Johor	Malaysia	2.2	Mario Vogt (GER)	Team Sapura Cycling	
10–12 May	Sri Lanka T-Cup	Sri Lanka	2.2	Cancelled due to terrorist attack		
19–26 May	Tour of Japan	Japan	2.1	Chris Harper (AUS)	Team BridgeLane	
23–26 May	PRUride Philippines	Philippines	2.2	Marcelo Felipe (PHI)	7 Eleven–Cliqq–air21 by Roadbike Philippines	
23–30 May	Tour of Taiyuan	China	2.2	Cameron Piper (USA)	Team Illuminate	
30 May – 2 June	Tour de Kumano	Japan	2.2	Orluis Aular (VEN)	Matrix Powertag	
12–16 June	Tour de Korea	South Korea	2.1	Filippo Zaccanti (ITA)	Nippo–Vini Fantini–Faizanè	
14–18 June	Tour de Filipinas	Philippines	2.1	Jeroen Meijers (NED)	Taiyuan Miogee Cycling Team	
14–27 July	Tour of Qinghai Lake	China	2.HC	Robinson Chalapud (COL)	Team Medellín	
21 July	Tokyo 2020 Test Event	Japan	1.2	Diego Ulissi (ITA)	UAE Team Emirates XRG	
11 August	Oita Urban Classic	Japan	1.2	Drew Morey (AUS)	Terengganu Cycling Team	
19 – 23 August	Tour de Indonesia	Indonesia	2.1	Thomas Lebas (FRA)	Kinan Racing Team	
31 August – 1 September	Tour of Almaty	Kazakhstan	2.1	Yuriy Natarov (KAZ)	XDS Astana Team	
2–4 September	Tour of Xingtai	China	2.2	Carlos Cobos Márquez (ESP)	Vigo-Rias Baixas	
6–8 September	Tour de Hokkaido	Japan	2.2	Filippo Zaccanti (ITA)	Nippo–Vini Fantini–Faizanè	
7–14 September	Tour of China I	China	2.1	Jeroen Meijers (NED)	Taiyuan Miogee Cycling Team	
16–22 September	Tour of China II	China	2.1	Lü Xianjing (CHN)	Hengxiang Cycling Team	
18–21 September	Tour de Siak	Indonesia	2.2	Nur Amirul Fakhruddin Mazuki (MAS)	Terengganu Cycling Team	
23–26 September	International Tour de Banyuwangi Ijen	Indonesia	2.2	Robbie Hucker (AUS)	JCL Team Ukyo	
2–6 October	Tour of Iran	Iran	2.1	Savva Novikov (RUS)	Lokosphinx	
8–12 October	Jelajah Malaysia	Malaysia	2.2	Cancelled due lack of sponsors		
9–15 October	Tour of Taihu Lake	China	2.1	Dylan Kennett (NZL)	St George Continental Cycling Team	
12–13 October	Hammer Hong Kong	Hong Kong	2.1	Cancelled due to potential civil unrest		
15–19 October	Tour of Peninsular	Malaysia	2.1	Marcos García (ESP)	Kinan Cycling Team	
20 October	Japan Cup	Japan	1.HC	Bauke Mollema (NED)	Trek–Segafredo	

== Final standings ==
=== Individual classification ===
Rank	Name	Points
1.	Alexey Lutsenko (KAZ)	1688
2.	Lü Xianjing (CHN)	508
3.	Yevgeniy Gidich (KAZ)	362.67
4.	Nariyuki Masuda (JPN)	287.17
5.	Feng Chun-kai (TPE)	280
6.	Vadim Pronskiy (KAZ)	250
7.	Mohammad Ganjkhanlou (IRI)	235
8.	Dmitriy Gruzdev (KAZ)	226.67
9.	Daniil Fominykh (KAZ)	225.67
10.	Goh Choon Huat (SIN)	210

=== Team classification ===
Rank	Team	Points
1.	(Malaysia) Terengganu Inc. TSG	2205
2.	(Malaysia) Team Sapura Cycling	1704.97
3.	(Japan) Team Ukyo	985.17
4.	(Hong Kong) HKSI Pro Cycling Team	735
5.	(Japan) Matrix Powertag	673
6.	(Kazakhstan) Vino–Astana Motors	615
7.	(China) Hengxiang Cycling Team	590
8.	(Japan) Interpro Cycling Academy	534
9.	(Japan) Kinan Cycling Team	524
10.	(Bahrain) VIB Sports	515
11.	(China) Shenzhen Xidesheng Cycling Team	484
12.	(Japan) Utsunomiya Blitzen	439.17
13.	(China) Ningxia Sports Lottery Livall Gusto	434.01
14.	(Iran) Foolad Mobarakeh Sepahan	425.25
15.	(China) Taiyuan Miogee Cycling Team	397
16.	(China) Tianyoude Hotel Cycling Team	368.25
17.	(Japan) Aisan Racing Team	325.17
18.	(South Korea) LX Cycling Team	298.34
19.	(Kazakhstan) Astana City	270
20.	7 Eleven–Cliqq–air21 by Roadbike Philippines	258
21.	Brunei Continental Cycling Team	255.33
22.	(Indonesia) PGN Road Cycling Team	236
23.	(China) Yunnan Lvshan Landscape	210.25
24.	(Japan) Team Bridgestone Cycling	197.17
25.	(Japan) Shimano Racing Team	177
26.	(South Korea) Geumsan Insam Cello	170.17
27.	Thailand Continental Cycling Team	143
28.	(South Korea) Seoul Cycling Team	137.17
29.	(Hong Kong) X-Speed United	130
30.	(South Korea) Korail Cycling Team	107.17
31.	(South Korea) KSPO Bianchi Asia	104.17
32.	(China) Mitchelton–BikeExchange	86
33.	(Iran) Fengsheng Sports DFT Team	80
34.	(China) Giant Cycling Team	76
35.	(South Korea) China Liv Pro Cycling	64
36.	(South Korea) Uijeongbu Cycling Team	43
37.	(Philippines) Team Go for Gold	28
38.	China Continental Team of Gansu Bank	20
39.	(Indonesia) KFC Cycling Team	18
40.	(Kazakhstan) Apple Team	17
41.	(Iran) Omidnia Mashhad Team	6
42.	Customs Cycling Indonesia	3
43.	(China) Rally UHC Cycling	3
44.	(Japan) Nasu Blasen	1

=== Nation classification ===
Rank	Nation	Points
1.	Kazakhstan	3259.35
2.	Iran	977
3.	Japan	849.17
4.	China	744
5.	Hong Kong	719
6.	South Korea	691.51
7.	Mongolia	593
8.	United Arab Emirates	517.5
9.	Chinese Taipei	514
10.	Singapore	455
11.	Malaysia	425.42
12.	Uzbekistan	319.01
13.	Indonesia	289
14.	Philippines	275
15.	Qatar	194
16.	Thailand	116
17.	Laos	42
18.	India	21
19.	Syria	8
20.	Macau	1
