= 2017 Colorado Classic =

2017 UCI America Tour

Race details
- Dates: August 10–13, 2017
- Stages: 4
- Distance: 503.5 km (312.9 mi)
- Winning time: 12h 00' 35"

Results
	Winner	Manuel Senni (ITA)
	Second	Serghei Tvetcov (ROM)
	Third	Alex Howes (USA)
	Points	Travis McCabe (USA)
	Mountains	Serghei Tvetcov (ROM)
	Youth	Jhonatan Narváez (ECU)
	Combativity	Fabio Calabria (AUS)
	Team	Cannondale–Drapac

The 2017 Colorado Classic was a four-stage 2.HC event on the 2017 UCI America Tour.

== Teams ==
Sixteen teams started the race. Each team had a maximum of six riders:

UCI WorldTeams

- Cannondale–Drapac
- Trek–Segafredo
- UAE Team Emirates
- BMC Racing Team

UCI Professional Continental teams

- UnitedHealthcare
- Nippo–Vini Fantini
- Team Novo Nordisk
- Caja Rural–Seguros RGA
- Israel Cycling Academy

UCI Continental teams

- Jelly Belly–Maxxis
- Rally Cycling
- Axeon–Hagens Berman
- Holowesko Citadel Racing Team
- Silber Pro Cycling Team
- Elevate–KHS Pro Cycling

National team

- Rwanda

== Route ==
Stage characteristics and winners
Stage	Date	Course	Distance	Type	Stage winner
1	August 10	Colorado Springs to Colorado Springs	150.4 km (93.5 mi)	Hilly stage	John Murphy (USA)
2	August 11	Breckenridge to Breckenridge	103 km (64 mi)	Medium mountain stage	Alex Howes (USA)
3	August 12	Denver to Denver	130 km (81 mi)	Mountain stage	Serghei Tvetcov (ROM)
4	August 13	Denver to Denver	120.1 km (74.6 mi)	Hilly stage	Mihkel Räim (EST)

== Final standings ==
=== General classification ===
The general classification was won by Manuel Senni.

Final general classification

Rank	Rider	Team	Time
1	Manuel Senni (ITA)	BMC Racing Team	12h 00' 35"
2	Serghei Țvetcov (ROM)	Jelly Belly–Maxxis	+ 15"
3	Alex Howes (USA)	EF Education First–Drapac p/b Cannondale	+ 31"
4	Taylor Eisenhart (USA)	Holowesko Citadel p/b Arapahoe Resources	+ 33"
5	Peter Stetina (USA)	Trek–Segafredo	+ 44"
6	Sepp Kuss (USA)	Rally Cycling	+ 1' 05"
7	Brent Bookwalter (USA)	BMC Racing Team	+ 2' 16"
8	Miguel Ángel Benito (ESP)	Caja Rural–Seguros RGA	+ 2' 19"
9	Vegard Stake Laengen (NOR)	UAE Team Emirates	+ 2' 21"
10	Travis McCabe (USA)	UnitedHealthcare	+ 2' 22"

=== Points classification ===
The points classification was won by Travis McCabe.

Final points classification

Rank	Rider	Team	Points
1	Travis McCabe (USA)	UnitedHealthcare	43
2	Alex Howes (USA)	EF Education First–Drapac p/b Cannondale	28
3	Manuel Senni (ITA)	BMC Racing Team	25
4	Serghei Țvetcov (ROM)	Jelly Belly–Maxxis	24
5	Taylor Eisenhart (USA)	Holowesko Citadel p/b Arapahoe Resources	20
6	Mihkel Räim (EST)	Israel Cycling Academy	15
7	Kiel Reijnen (USA)	Trek–Segafredo	15
8	Marco Canola (ITA)	Nippo–Vini Fantini–Europa Ovini	14
9	Rubén Companioni (CUB)	Holowesko Citadel p/b Arapahoe Resources	11
10	Brent Bookwalter (USA)	BMC Racing Team	11

=== Mountains classification ===
The mountain classification was won by Serghei Tvetcov (where he was also named best Colorado rider).

Final mountains classification

Rank	Rider	Team	Points
1	Serghei Țvetcov (ROM)	Jelly Belly–Maxxis	19
2	Taylor Eisenhart (USA)	Holowesko Citadel p/b Arapahoe Resources	14
3	Peter Stetina (USA)	Trek–Segafredo	9
4	Marco Canola (ITA)	Nippo–Vini Fantini–Europa Ovini	8
5	Antonio Molina (ESP)	Caja Rural–Seguros RGA	8
6	Manuel Senni (ITA)	BMC Racing Team	8
7	Jonathan Clarke (AUS)	UnitedHealthcare	5
8	Daniel Eaton (USA)	UnitedHealthcare	5
9	Angus Morton (AUS)	Holowesko Citadel p/b Arapahoe Resources	5
10	Joseph Schmalz (USA)	Elevate–KHS Pro Cycling	5

=== Best young classification ===
The youth classification was won by Jhonatan Narváez.

Final young rider classification

Rank	Rider	Team	Time
1	Jhonatan Narváez (ECU)	Hagens Berman Axeon	12h 08' 39"
2	Justin Oien (USA)	Caja Rural–Seguros RGA	+ 14' 16"
3	Alec Cowan (CAN)	Silber Pro Cycling Team	+ 17' 25"
4	Seid Lizde (ITA)	UAE Team Emirates	+ 20' 23"
5	Alex Hoehn (USA)	Elevate–KHS Pro Cycling	+ 20' 56"
6	Jean-Paul Ukiniwabo (RWA)	Rwanda	+ 21' 02"
7	Edward Anderson (USA)	Hagens Berman Axeon	+ 21' 11"
8	Keegan Swirbul (USA)	Jelly Belly–Maxxis	+ 22' 13"
9	Logan Owen (USA)	Hagens Berman Axeon	+ 24' 12"
10	Umberto Poli (ITA)	Team Novo Nordisk	+ 25' 05"

=== Team classification ===
Final teams classification

Rank	Team	Time
1	Cannondale–Drapac	36h 08' 03"
2	UAE Team Emirates	+ 1' 21"
3	Trek–Segafredo	+ 9' 25"
4	BMC Racing Team	+ 11' 53"
5	UnitedHealthcare	+ 16' 00"
6	Caja Rural–Seguros RGA	+ 19' 59"
7	Jelly Belly–Maxxis	+ 25' 04"
8	Holowesko Citadel Racing Team	+ 26' 24"
9	Rally Cycling	+ 42' 45"
10	Nippo–Vini Fantini	+ 43' 43"
