= 2019 Tour of Utah =

2019 UCI America Tour

Race details
- Dates: 12 – 18 August 2019
- Stages: 6 + Prologue
- Distance: 787.9 km (489.6 mi)

Results
Jersey awarded to the overall winner	Winner	Ben Hermans (BEL)	(Israel Cycling Academy)
	Second	James Piccoli (CAN)	(Elevate–KHS Pro Cycling)
	Third	Joe Dombrowski (USA)	(EF Education First)
Jersey awarded to the points classification winner	Points	Travis McCabe (USA)	(Floyd's Pro Cycling)
Jersey awarded to the mountains classification winner	Mountains	Hayden McCormick (NZL)	(Team BridgeLane)
Jersey awarded to the youth classification winner	Youth	João Almeida (POR)	(Hagens Berman Axeon)
	Team	EF Education First	

The 2019 Larry H. Miller Tour of Utah was a seven-stage road cycling stage race that was held from August 12 to August 18 in the American state of Utah. It was the 15th edition of the Tour of Utah and is rated as a 2.HC on the 2019 UCI America Tour.

== Schedule ==
Stage characteristics and winners
Stage	Date	Course	Distance	Type	Stage winner
P	August 12	Snowbird Resort	5.3 km (3.3 mi)	Individual time trial	James Piccoli (CAN)
1	August 13	North Logan to North Logan	145.2 km (90.2 mi)	Hilly stage	Umberto Marengo (ITA)
2	August 14	Brigham City to Powder Mountain Resort	138.2 km (85.9 mi)	Mountain stage	Ben Hermans (BEL)
3	August 15	Antelope Island to North Salt Lake	137.5 km (85.4 mi)	Hilly stage	Ben Hermans (BEL)
4	August 16	Salt Lake City to Salt Lake City	86.5 km (53.7 mi)	Hilly stage	Marco Canola (ITA)
5	August 17	Canyons Village to Canyons Village	142.1 km (88.3 mi)	Hilly stage	Lachlan Morton (AUS)
6	August 18	Park City to Park City	133.1 km (82.7 mi)	Mountain stage	Joe Dombrowski (USA)
Total		787.9 km (489.6 mi)			

== Teams ==
Two UCI WorldTeams, five UCI Professional Continental teams, and ten UCI Continental teams made up the seventeen teams that participated in the race. Of these teams, four teams (Dauner–Akkon, EF Education First, Nippo–Vini Fantini–Faizanè, and Trek–Segafredo) entered only six riders each, while the rest entered seven each. 101 of the 115 riders in the race finished.

UCI WorldTeams

- EF Education First
- Trek–Segafredo

UCI Professional Continental Teams

- Hagens Berman Axeon
- Israel Cycling Academy
- Neri Sottoli–Selle Italia–KTM
- Nippo–Vini Fantini–Faizanè
- Rally UHC Cycling

UCI Continental Teams

- 303Project
- Aevolo
- Arapahoe Hincapie p/b BMC
- Canel's–Specialized
- Dauner–Akkon
- DCBank Pro Cycling Team
- Elevate–KHS Pro Cycling
- Floyd's Pro Cycling (Note: For this race, Floyd's Pro Cycling competed under the name 'Worthy Pro Cycling.')
- Team BridgeLane
- Wildlife Generation Pro Cycling p/b Maxxis

== Stages ==
=== Prologue ===
12 August 2019 – Snowbird Resort, 5.3 km (3.3 mi), individual time trial (ITT)

Pre-race favorite Daniel Martínez was forced to pull out of the race at the last moment due to illness, meaning that EF Education First would begin the race with only 5 riders.

Prologue result
Rank	Rider	Team	Time
1	James Piccoli (CAN)	Elevate–KHS Pro Cycling	8' 37"
2	Lawson Craddock (USA)	EF Education First	+ 5"
3	Serghei Țvetcov (ROM)	Floyd's Pro Cycling	+ 6"
4	João Almeida (POR)	Hagens Berman Axeon	+ 6"
5	Kyle Murphy (USA)	Rally UHC Cycling	+ 11"
6	Gavin Mannion (USA)	Rally UHC Cycling	+ 14"
7	Joe Dombrowski (USA)	EF Education First	+ 14"
8	Guillaume Boivin (CAN)	Israel Cycling Academy	+ 15"
9	Keegan Swirbul (USA)	Floyd's Pro Cycling	+ 16"
10	Travis McCabe (USA)	Floyd's Pro Cycling	+ 17"

General classification after Prologue
Rank	Rider	Team	Time
1	James Piccoli (CAN)	Elevate–KHS Pro Cycling	8' 37"
2	Lawson Craddock (USA)	EF Education First	+ 5"
3	Serghei Țvetcov (ROM)	Floyd's Pro Cycling	+ 6"
4	João Almeida (POR)	Hagens Berman Axeon	+ 6"
5	Kyle Murphy (USA)	Rally UHC Cycling	+ 11"
6	Gavin Mannion (USA)	Rally UHC Cycling	+ 14"
7	Joe Dombrowski (USA)	EF Education First	+ 14"
8	Guillaume Boivin (CAN)	Israel Cycling Academy	+ 15"
9	Keegan Swirbul (USA)	Floyd's Pro Cycling	+ 16"
10	Travis McCabe (USA)	Floyd's Pro Cycling	+ 17"

=== Stage 1 ===
13 August 2019 – North Logan to North Logan, 145.2 km (90.2 mi)

Stage 1 result
Rank	Rider	Team	Time
1	Umberto Marengo (ITA)	Neri Sottoli–Selle Italia–KTM	3h 23' 32"
2	Lawson Craddock (USA)	EF Education First	+ 0"
3	Edwin Ávila (COL)	Israel Cycling Academy	+ 0"
4	Griffin Easter (USA)	303Project	+ 0"
5	João Almeida (POR)	Hagens Berman Axeon	+ 0"
6	Sebastian Schönberger (AUT)	Neri Sottoli–Selle Italia–KTM	+ 0"
7	Travis McCabe (USA)	Floyd's Pro Cycling	+ 6"
8	Michael Rice (AUS)	Hagens Berman Axeon	+ 6"
9	Tyler Magner (USA)	Rally UHC Cycling	+ 6"
10	Cole Davis (USA)	Hagens Berman Axeon	+ 6"

General classification after Stage 1
Rank	Rider	Team	Time
1	Lawson Craddock (USA)	EF Education First	3h 32' 09"
2	João Almeida (POR)	Hagens Berman Axeon	+ 6"
3	Serghei Țvetcov (ROM)	Floyd's Pro Cycling	+ 12"
4	Kyle Murphy (USA)	Rally UHC Cycling	+ 18"
5	Gavin Mannion (USA)	Rally UHC Cycling	+ 21"
6	Joe Dombrowski (USA)	EF Education First	+ 21"
7	Guillaume Boivin (CAN)	Israel Cycling Academy	+ 22"
8	Keegan Swirbul (USA)	Floyd's Pro Cycling	+ 23"
9	Travis McCabe (USA)	Floyd's Pro Cycling	+ 23"
10	Ben Hermans (BEL)	Israel Cycling Academy	+ 24"

=== Stage 2 ===
14 August 2019 – Brigham City to Powder Mountain Resort, 138.2 km (85.9 mi)

Stage 2 result
Rank	Rider	Team	Time
1	Ben Hermans (BEL)	Israel Cycling Academy	3h 37' 44"
2	James Piccoli (CAN)	Elevate–KHS Pro Cycling	+ 20"
3	Niklas Eg (DEN)	Trek–Segafredo	+ 35"
4	Peter Stetina (USA)	Trek–Segafredo	+ 58"
5	Joe Dombrowski (USA)	EF Education First	+ 1' 26"
6	Kyle Murphy (USA)	Rally UHC Cycling	+ 1' 31"
7	Rob Britton (CAN)	Rally UHC Cycling	+ 1' 36"
8	João Almeida (POR)	Hagens Berman Axeon	+ 1' 54"
9	Matteo Badilatti (SUI)	Israel Cycling Academy	+ 2' 37"
10	Scott Bowden (AUS)	Team BridgeLane	+ 2' 52"

General classification after Stage 2
Rank	Rider	Team	Time
1	Ben Hermans (BEL)	Israel Cycling Academy	7h 10' 07"
2	James Piccoli (CAN)	Elevate–KHS Pro Cycling	+ 26"
3	Niklas Eg (DEN)	Trek–Segafredo	+ 52"
4	Peter Stetina (USA)	Trek–Segafredo	+ 1' 10"
5	Joe Dombrowski (USA)	EF Education First	+ 1' 33"
6	Kyle Murphy (USA)	Rally UHC Cycling	+ 1' 35"
7	João Almeida (POR)	Hagens Berman Axeon	+ 1' 46"
8	Rob Britton (CAN)	Rally UHC Cycling	+ 1' 47"
9	Lawson Craddock (USA)	EF Education First	+ 2' 56"
10	Matteo Badilatti (SUI)	Israel Cycling Academy	+ 2' 58"

=== Stage 3 ===
15 August 2019 – Antelope Island to North Salt Lake, 137.5 km (85.4 mi)

Stage 3 result
Rank	Rider	Team	Time
1	Ben Hermans (BEL)	Israel Cycling Academy	3h 20' 27"
2	Kyle Murphy (USA)	Rally UHC Cycling	+ 7"
3	Niklas Eg (DEN)	Trek–Segafredo	+ 8"
4	Keegan Swirbul (USA)	Floyd's Pro Cycling	+ 8"
5	James Piccoli (CAN)	Elevate–KHS Pro Cycling	+ 8"
6	Lawson Craddock (USA)	EF Education First	+ 11"
7	Joe Dombrowski (USA)	EF Education First	+ 21"
8	Matteo Badilatti (SUI)	Israel Cycling Academy	+ 36"
9	Scott Bowden (AUS)	Team BridgeLane	+ 36"
10	João Almeida (POR)	Hagens Berman Axeon	+ 42"

General classification after Stage 3
Rank	Rider	Team	Time
1	Ben Hermans (BEL)	Israel Cycling Academy	10h 30' 24"
2	James Piccoli (CAN)	Elevate–KHS Pro Cycling	+ 44"
3	Niklas Eg (DEN)	Trek–Segafredo	+ 1' 06"
4	Kyle Murphy (USA)	Rally UHC Cycling	+ 1' 46"
5	Peter Stetina (USA)	Trek–Segafredo	+ 2' 02"
6	Joe Dombrowski (USA)	EF Education First	+ 2' 04"
7	João Almeida (POR)	Hagens Berman Axeon	+ 2' 38"
8	Rob Britton (CAN)	Rally UHC Cycling	+ 3' 12"
9	Lawson Craddock (USA)	EF Education First	+ 3' 17"
10	Matteo Badilatti (SUI)	Israel Cycling Academy	+ 3' 44"

=== Stage 4 ===
16 August 2019 – Salt Lake City to Salt Lake City, 86.5 km (53.7 mi)

Stage 4 result
Rank	Rider	Team	Time
1	Marco Canola (ITA)	Nippo–Vini Fantini–Faizanè	1h 56' 54"
2	Travis McCabe (USA)	Floyd's Pro Cycling	+ 0"
3	Brendan Rhim (USA)	Arapahoe Hincapie p/b BMC	+ 0"
4	Pablo Alarcón (CHI)	Canel's–Specialized	+ 0"
5	Guillaume Boivin (CAN)	Israel Cycling Academy	+ 0"
6	Peter Stetina (USA)	Trek–Segafredo	+ 0"
7	James Piccoli (CAN)	Elevate–KHS Pro Cycling	+ 0"
8	Joe Dombrowski (USA)	EF Education First	+ 0"
9	Ben Hermans (BEL)	Israel Cycling Academy	+ 0"
10	Griffin Easter (USA)	303Project	+ 0"

General classification after Stage 4
Rank	Rider	Team	Time
1	Ben Hermans (BEL)	Israel Cycling Academy	12h 27' 18"
2	James Piccoli (CAN)	Elevate–KHS Pro Cycling	+ 44"
3	Niklas Eg (DEN)	Trek–Segafredo	+ 1' 06"
4	Kyle Murphy (USA)	Rally UHC Cycling	+ 1' 46"
5	Peter Stetina (USA)	Trek–Segafredo	+ 2' 02"
6	Joe Dombrowski (USA)	EF Education First	+ 2' 04"
7	João Almeida (POR)	Hagens Berman Axeon	+ 2' 48"
8	Lawson Craddock (USA)	EF Education First	+ 3' 17"
9	Rob Britton (CAN)	Rally UHC Cycling	+ 3' 22"
10	Matteo Badilatti (SUI)	Israel Cycling Academy	+ 3' 54"

=== Stage 5 ===
17 August 2019 – Canyons Village (Park City Mountain) to Canyons Village (Park City Mountain), 142.1 km (88.3 mi)

Stage 5 result
Rank	Rider	Team	Time
1	Lachlan Morton (AUS)	EF Education First	3h 05' 54"
2	Hayden McCormick (NZL)	Team BridgeLane	+ 0"
3	Simone Velasco (ITA)	Neri Sottoli–Selle Italia–KTM	+ 18"
4	Marco Canola (ITA)	Nippo–Vini Fantini–Faizanè	+ 18"
5	Evan Huffman (USA)	Rally UHC Cycling	+ 18"
6	Dylan Sunderland (AUS)	Team BridgeLane	+ 26"
7	Michael Rice (AUS)	Hagens Berman Axeon	+ 29"
8	Samuel Boardman (USA)	Wildlife Generation Pro Cycling p/b Maxxis	+ 29"
9	Matt Zimmer (USA)	DCBank Pro Cycling Team	+ 31"
10	Bernat Font Mas (ESP)	303Project	+ 49"

General classification after Stage 5
Rank	Rider	Team	Time
1	Ben Hermans (BEL)	Israel Cycling Academy	15h 34' 34"
2	James Piccoli (CAN)	Elevate–KHS Pro Cycling	+ 46"
3	Niklas Eg (DEN)	Trek–Segafredo	+ 1' 10"
4	Kyle Murphy (USA)	Rally UHC Cycling	+ 1' 48"
5	Joe Dombrowski (USA)	EF Education First	+ 2' 08"
6	João Almeida (POR)	Hagens Berman Axeon	+ 2' 34"
7	Peter Stetina (USA)	Trek–Segafredo	+ 2' 47"
8	Lawson Craddock (USA)	EF Education First	+ 3' 10"
9	Rob Britton (CAN)	Rally UHC Cycling	+ 3' 53"
10	Matteo Badilatti (SUI)	Israel Cycling Academy	+ 4' 15"

=== Stage 6 ===
18 August 2019 – Park City to Park City, 133.1 km (82.7 mi)

Stage 6 result
Rank	Rider	Team	Time
1	Joe Dombrowski (USA)	EF Education First	3h 11' 09"
2	João Almeida (POR)	Hagens Berman Axeon	+ 24"
3	Keegan Swirbul (USA)	Floyd's Pro Cycling	+ 26"
4	Ben Hermans (BEL)	Israel Cycling Academy	+ 26"
5	James Piccoli (CAN)	Elevate–KHS Pro Cycling	+ 30"
6	Lawson Craddock (USA)	EF Education First	+ 1' 24"
7	Matteo Badilatti (SUI)	Israel Cycling Academy	+ 1' 39"
8	Kyle Murphy (USA)	Rally UHC Cycling	+ 1' 58"
9	Rob Britton (CAN)	Rally UHC Cycling	+ 2' 06"
10	Lachlan Morton (AUS)	EF Education First	+ 2' 11"

General classification after Stage 6
Rank	Rider	Team	Time
1	Ben Hermans (BEL)	Israel Cycling Academy	18h 46' 09"
2	James Piccoli (CAN)	Elevate–KHS Pro Cycling	+ 50"
3	Joe Dombrowski (USA)	EF Education First	+ 1' 32"
4	João Almeida (POR)	Hagens Berman Axeon	+ 2' 26"
5	Niklas Eg (DEN)	Trek–Segafredo	+ 2' 57"
6	Kyle Murphy (USA)	Rally UHC Cycling	+ 3' 20"
7	Lawson Craddock (USA)	EF Education First	+ 4' 08"
8	Keegan Swirbul (USA)	Floyd's Pro Cycling	+ 4' 40"
9	Peter Stetina (USA)	Trek–Segafredo	+ 5' 22"
10	Matteo Badilatti (SUI)	Israel Cycling Academy	+ 5' 28"

== Classification leadership ==
Stage	Winner	General classification	Sprints classification	Mountains classification	Young rider classification	Most Aggressive Rider award	Teams Classification	Fan Favorite award
P	James Piccoli	James Piccoli	Serghei Țvetcov	Lawson Craddock	João Almeida	João Almeida	Floyd's Pro Cycling	Tony Baca
1	Umberto Marengo	Lawson Craddock	Umberto Marengo	Samuel Boardman	João Almeida	Travis Samuel	EF Education First	Maxx Chance
2	Ben Hermans	Ben Hermans	Umberto Marengo	Ben Hermans	João Almeida	James Piccoli	Rally UHC Cycling	Joe Dombrowski
3	Ben Hermans	Ben Hermans	Lawson Craddock	Alex Howes	João Almeida	Kyle Murphy	Trek–Segafredo	Travis McCabe
4	Marco Canola	Ben Hermans	Travis McCabe	Alex Howes	João Almeida	Hayden McCormick	Trek–Segafredo	Bernat Font Mas
5	Lachlan Morton	Ben Hermans	Travis McCabe	Hayden McCormick	João Almeida	Lachlan Morton	Trek–Segafredo	Kevin Vermaerke
6	Joe Dombrowski	Ben Hermans	Travis McCabe	Hayden McCormick	João Almeida	James Piccoli	EF Education First	Tony Baca
Final		Ben Hermans	Travis McCabe	Hayden McCormick	João Almeida	not awarded	EF Education First	not awarded

== Classification standings ==
=== General classification ===
Final general classification (1–10)
Rank	Rider	Team	Time
1	Ben Hermans (BEL)	Israel Cycling Academy	18h 46' 09"
2	James Piccoli (CAN)	Elevate–KHS Pro Cycling	+ 50"
3	Joe Dombrowski (USA)	EF Education First	+ 1' 32"
4	João Almeida (POR)	Hagens Berman Axeon	+ 2' 26"
5	Niklas Eg (DEN)	Trek–Segafredo	+ 2' 57"
6	Kyle Murphy (USA)	Rally UHC Cycling	+ 3' 20"
7	Lawson Craddock (USA)	EF Education First	+ 4' 08"
8	Keegan Swirbul (USA)	Floyd's Pro Cycling	+ 4' 40"
9	Peter Stetina (USA)	Trek–Segafredo	+ 5' 22"
10	Matteo Badilatti (SUI)	Israel Cycling Academy	+ 5' 28"

=== Points classification ===
Final points classification (1–10)
Rank	Rider	Team	Points
1	Travis McCabe (USA)	Floyd's Pro Cycling	47
2	Marco Canola (ITA)	Nippo–Vini Fantini–Faizanè	32
3	Ben Hermans (BEL)	Israel Cycling Academy	24
4	Joe Dombrowski (USA)	EF Education First	22
5	Lawson Craddock (USA)	EF Education First	22
6	Umberto Marengo (ITA)	Neri Sottoli–Selle Italia–KTM	21
7	João Almeida (POR)	Hagens Berman Axeon	19
8	Hayden McCormick (NZL)	Team BridgeLane	17
9	Keegan Swirbul (USA)	Floyd's Pro Cycling	17
10	Lachlan Morton (AUS)	EF Education First	16

=== Mountains classification ===
Final mountains classification (1–10)
Rank	Rider	Team	Points
1	Hayden McCormick (NZL)	Team BridgeLane	30
2	Ben Hermans (BEL)	Israel Cycling Academy	22
3	Joe Dombrowski (USA)	EF Education First	18
4	Alex Howes (USA)	EF Education First	18
5	James Piccoli (CAN)	Elevate–KHS Pro Cycling	16
6	Marco Canola (ITA)	Nippo–Vini Fantini–Faizanè	16
7	Samuel Boardman (USA)	Wildlife Generation Pro Cycling p/b Maxxis	11
8	Kyle Murphy (USA)	Rally UHC Cycling	11
9	João Almeida (POR)	Hagens Berman Axeon	10
10	Niklas Eg (DEN)	Trek–Segafredo	10

=== Young rider classification ===
Final young rider classification (1–10)
Rank	Rider	Team	Time
1	João Almeida (POR)	Hagens Berman Axeon	18h 48' 35"
2	Alex Hoehn (USA)	Aevolo	+ 10' 01"
3	Juan Pedro López (ESP)	Trek–Segafredo	+ 11' 52"
4	Kevin Vermaerke (USA)	Hagens Berman Axeon	+ 15' 52"
5	Edward Anderson (USA)	Hagens Berman Axeon	+ 22' 38"
6	Andrew Vollmer (USA)	Aevolo	+ 23' 00"
7	Dominik Bauer (GER)	Dauner–Akkon	+ 23' 45"
8	Conor Schunk (USA)	Aevolo	+ 28' 37"
9	Gabriel Rojas (CRC)	Aevolo	+ 31' 26"
10	Cade Bickmore (USA)	Aevolo	+ 42' 08"

=== Teams classification ===
Final teams classification (1–10)
Rank	Team	Time
1	EF Education First	56h 35' 03"
2	Israel Cycling Academy	+ 2' 45"
3	Trek–Segafredo	+ 5' 54"
4	Rally UHC Cycling	+ 13' 20"
5	Hagens Berman Axeon	+ 20' 31"
6	Floyd's Pro Cycling	+ 24' 22"
7	Neri Sottoli–Selle Italia–KTM	+ 26' 23"
8	Aevolo	+ 37' 55"
9	Team BridgeLane	+ 40' 05"
10	303Project	+ 47' 20"
