= 2018 Tour of Utah =

2018 UCI America Tour

Race details
- Dates: August 6–12, 2018
- Stages: 6 + Prologue
- Distance: 863.9 km (536.8 mi)
- Winning time: 21h 41' 12"

Results
	Winner	Sepp Kuss (USA)	(LottoNL–Jumbo)
	Second	Ben Hermans (BEL)	(Israel Cycling Academy)
	Third	Jack Haig (AUS)	(Mitchelton–Scott)
	Points	Travis McCabe (USA)	(UnitedHealthcare)
	Mountains	Sepp Kuss (USA)	(LottoNL–Jumbo)
	Youth	Luis Villalobos (MEX)	(Aevolo)
	Team	EF Education First–Drapac p/b Cannondale	

The 2018 Tour of Utah was a seven-stage road cycling race held from August 6 to August 12, 2018, and the 14th edition of the Tour of Utah. It was rated as a 2.HC on the 2018 UCI America Tour.

== Teams ==
Seventeen teams entered the race. Each team had a maximum of seven riders:

UCI WorldTeams

- BMC Racing Team
- LottoNL–Jumbo
- Trek–Segafredo
- EF Education First–Drapac p/b Cannondale
- Mitchelton–Scott

UCI Professional Continental teams

- Hagens Berman Axeon
- Israel Cycling Academy
- Rally Cycling
- Holowesko Citadel p/b Arapahoe Resources
- Nippo–Vini Fantini–Europa Ovini
- UnitedHealthcare

UCI Continental teams

- 303Project
- Elevate–KHS Pro Cycling
- Mobius–BridgeLane
- Aevolo
- Jelly Belly–Maxxis
- Silber Pro Cycling Team

== Route ==
Stage characteristics and winners
Stage	Date	Course	Distance	Type	Stage winner
P	August 6	St. George	5.3 km (3.3 mi)	Individual time trial	Tejay van Garderen (USA)
1	August 7	Cedar City to Cedar City	162.5 km (101.0 mi)	Mountain stage	Travis McCabe (USA)
2	August 8	Payson to Payson	142.6 km (88.6 mi)	Mountain stage	Sepp Kuss (USA)
3	August 9	Antelope Island to Layton	167.4 km (104.0 mi)	Medium mountain stage	Travis McCabe (USA)
4	August 10	Salt Lake City to Salt Lake City	110.1 km (68.4 mi)	Hilly stage	Jasper Philipsen (BEL)
5	August 11	Canyons Resort to Snowbird	152.6 km (94.8 mi)	Mountain stage	Sepp Kuss (USA)
6	August 12	Park City to Park City	123.4 km (76.7 mi)	Mountain stage	Sepp Kuss (USA)

== General Classification ==
Final general classification

Rank	Rider	Team	Time
1	Sepp Kuss (USA)	LottoNL–Jumbo	21h 41' 12"
2	Ben Hermans (BEL)	Israel Cycling Academy	+ 2' 09"
3	Jack Haig (AUS)	Mitchelton–Scott	+ 2' 21"
4	Brent Bookwalter (USA)	BMC Racing Team	+ 2' 39"
5	Hugh Carthy (GBR)	EF Education First–Drapac p/b Cannondale	+ 2' 42"
6	Joe Dombrowski (USA)	EF Education First–Drapac p/b Cannondale	+ 2' 58"
7	Keegan Swirbul (USA)	Jelly Belly–Maxxis	+ 3' 39"
8	Luis Villalobos (MEX)	Aevolo	+ 3' 57"
9	Michael Woods (CAN)	EF Education First–Drapac p/b Cannondale	+ 4' 38"
10	Peter Stetina (USA)	Trek–Segafredo	+ 5' 50"

== Classification leadership ==
Stage	Winner	General classification	Sprints Classification	Mountains Classification	Young Rider Classification	Most Aggressive Classification	Team Classification
P	Tejay van Garderen	Tejay van Garderen	Tejay van Garderen	not awarded	Neilson Powless	Pascal Eenkhoorn	BMC Racing Team
1	Travis McCabe	Tejay van Garderen	Travis McCabe	Daan Olivier	Neilson Powless	Evan Huffman	BMC Racing Team
2	Sepp Kuss	Sepp Kuss	Travis McCabe	Daan Olivier	Neilson Powless	Griffin Easter	EF Education First–Drapac p/b Cannondale
3	Travis McCabe	Sepp Kuss	Travis McCabe	Daan Olivier	Neilson Powless	Rob Britton	EF Education First–Drapac p/b Cannondale
4	Jasper Philipsen	Sepp Kuss	Travis McCabe	Daan Olivier	Neilson Powless	Jonathan Clarke	EF Education First–Drapac p/b Cannondale
5	Sepp Kuss	Sepp Kuss	Travis McCabe	Sepp Kuss	Luis Villalobos	Kilian Frankiny	EF Education First–Drapac p/b Cannondale
6	Sepp Kuss	Sepp Kuss	Travis McCabe	Sepp Kuss	Luis Villalobos	Nathan Brown	EF Education First–Drapac p/b Cannondale
Final		Sepp Kuss	Travis McCabe	Sepp Kuss	Luis Villalobos	Nathan Brown	EF Education First–Drapac p/b Cannondale
