= Swirbul =

Swirbul (a modification of Latvian: Zvirbulis) is a surname. Notable people with the surname include:

- Jake Swirbul (1898–1960), American aviation pioneer and co-founder of Grumman Aircraft Engineering Corporation
- Hailey Swirbul (born 1998), American cross-country skier
- Keegan Swirbul (born 1995), American cyclist
