= Joe Dombrowski =

American road cyclist

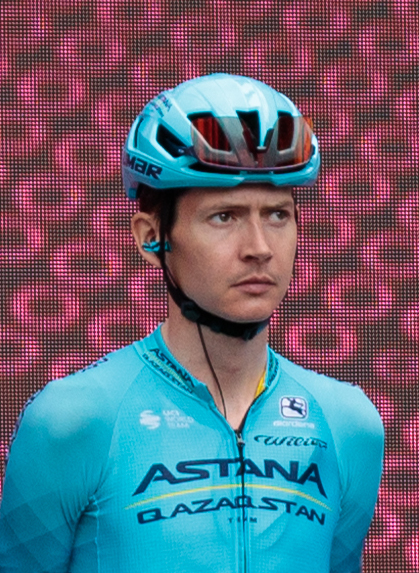
- Dombrowski at the 2023 Giro d'Italia

Personal information
- Full name: Joseph Lloyd Dombrowski
- Born: May 12, 1991 (age 35) Christiana, Delaware, United States
- Height: 1.88 m (6 ft 2 in)
- Weight: 68 kg (150 lb)

Cycling career
- Sport: Cycling
- Current team: Retired
- Discipline: Road
- Role: Rider
- Rider type: Climber

Amateur teams
- 2007–2008: NCVC–Inova Health System
- 2008–2010: Haymarket Bicycles–Function Drinks
- 2010: Trek–Livestrong (stagiaire)

Professional teams
- 2011–2012: Trek–Livestrong
- 2013–2014: Team Sky
- 2015–2019: Cannondale–Garmin
- 2020–2021: UAE Team Emirates
- 2022–2023: Astana Qazaqstan Team

Major wins
- Grand Tours Giro d'Italia 1 individual stage (2021) Stage races Tour of Utah (2015)

Joseph Lloyd Dombrowski (born May 12, 1991) is an American former road racing cyclist who competed professionally from 2011 to 2023. In his career Dombrowski competed for Bontrager–Livestrong, Team Sky, EF Education First, UAE Team Emirates and Astana Qazaqstan Team.

== Personal ==
Born on May 12, 1991, in Christiana, Delaware, United States, Dombrowski spent his adolescence in Marshall, Virginia, United States. He resides in Marshall, Virginia and Nice, France. Between 2009 and 2010, Dombrowski attended George Mason University in Fairfax, Virginia.

== Career ==
=== Early years ===
Dombrowski began mountain biking in 2006, cyclo-cross in 2007 and road racing in 2009, racing for local Virginian team Haymarket Bicycles. He competed with Trek–Livestrong, a UCI Continental team, for the 2011 and 2012 seasons. During the 2012 season, Dombrowski garnered significant results. He won the Girobio, finished fourth at the Tour of Utah, and placed tenth at the USA Pro Cycling Challenge.

=== Team Sky (2013–14) ===
Dombrowski signed with Team Sky, a UCI ProTeam, for the 2013 and 2014 seasons. During the 2013 season, Dombrowski assisted British teammate Chris Froome in various multi-day races. During the 2014 season, Dombrowski underwent successful iliac artery surgery.

=== Cannondale–Garmin (2015–19) ===
Dombrowski signed with Cannondale–Garmin, a UCI ProTeam, for the 2015 and 2016 seasons. While preparing for the 2015 Vuelta a España, he won the Tour of Utah. He recommitted to Cannondale–Drapac for the 2017 and 2018 seasons. He remained with the team, now known as EF Education First, into 2019. In 2019 he won another stage in the Tour of Utah and turned in his best performance in a Grand Tour coming in 12th place overall in the Giro d'Italia.

=== UAE Team Emirates (2020–21) ===
In September 2019 it was announced Dombrowski had signed a two-year contract with UAE Team Emirates. During the COVID-19 pandemic-affected 2020 season, Dombrowski's best general classification result was 26th at the Settimana Internazionale di Coppi e Bartali, while he finished 43rd at the Giro d'Italia.

At the 2021 Giro d'Italia, Dombrowski was part of a 25-rider breakaway on a rain-soaked fourth stage; he went clear of the field on the final climb, and soloed to a 13-second victory over Alessandro De Marchi. His first victory in Europe since winning the 2012 Girobio, Dombrowski moved up to second overall in the general classification – trailing De Marchi by 22 seconds – and assumed the blue jersey of mountains classification leader. The following day, Dombrowski crashed into a race marshal manning a traffic island in the last 4 kilometres (2.5 miles) of the stage to Cattolica. He remounted and finished the stage some eight minutes down, but abandoned the race the following morning with concussion. At the Vuelta a España later in the season, Dombrowski again featured in a first-week breakaway, this time on the third stage to a summit finish at Picón Blanco in the Province of Burgos. Dombrowski attacked this group with 5 kilometres (3.1 miles) to go, with only Kenny Elissonde and Rein Taaramäe able to follow; Taaramäe – who was also part of the Giro d'Italia breakaway – went on to take the stage by 21 seconds ahead of Dombrowski.

=== Astana Qazaqstan Team ===
In October 2021, Dombrowski signed a two-year contract with Astana–Premier Tech, later renamed as the Astana Qazaqstan Team, from the 2022 season.

== Major results ==
2011
2nd Overall Giro della Valle d'Aosta

1st Young rider classification
1st Stage 5

3rd Overall Ronde de l'Isard
6th Overall Tour of the Gila
8th Overall Flèche du Sud
2012
1st Overall Girobio

1st Young rider classification
1st Stages 4 & 8

3rd Overall Tour of the Gila

1st Young rider classification

4th Overall Tour of Utah

1st Young rider classification

10th Overall USA Pro Cycling Challenge

1st Young rider classification

10th Overall Cascade Cycling Classic
10th Trofeo Alcide Degasperi
2013
1st Stage 1b (TTT) Giro del Trentino
6th Japan Cup
2015
1st Overall Tour of Utah

1st Stage 6

2nd Road race, National Road Championships
4th Overall Tour of California
7th Overall Tour de San Luis
2016
8th Overall Tour of Utah
2018
5th Overall Colorado Classic
6th Overall Tour of Utah
2019
3rd Overall Tour of Utah

1st Stage 6

7th Overall Route d'Occitanie
2021
Giro d'Italia

1st Stage 4
Held after Stages 4–5

=== Grand Tour general classification results timeline ===
Grand Tour	2015	2016	2017	2018	2019	2020	2021	2022	2023
Giro d'Italia	—	34	69	63	12	43	DNF	22	59
Tour de France	—	—	—	—	—	—	—	42	—
Vuelta a España	46	88	101	—	—	—	39	—	57

Legend
DSQ	Disqualified
DNF	Did not finish
IP	In progress
