= Peter Stetina =

American racing cyclist (born 1987)

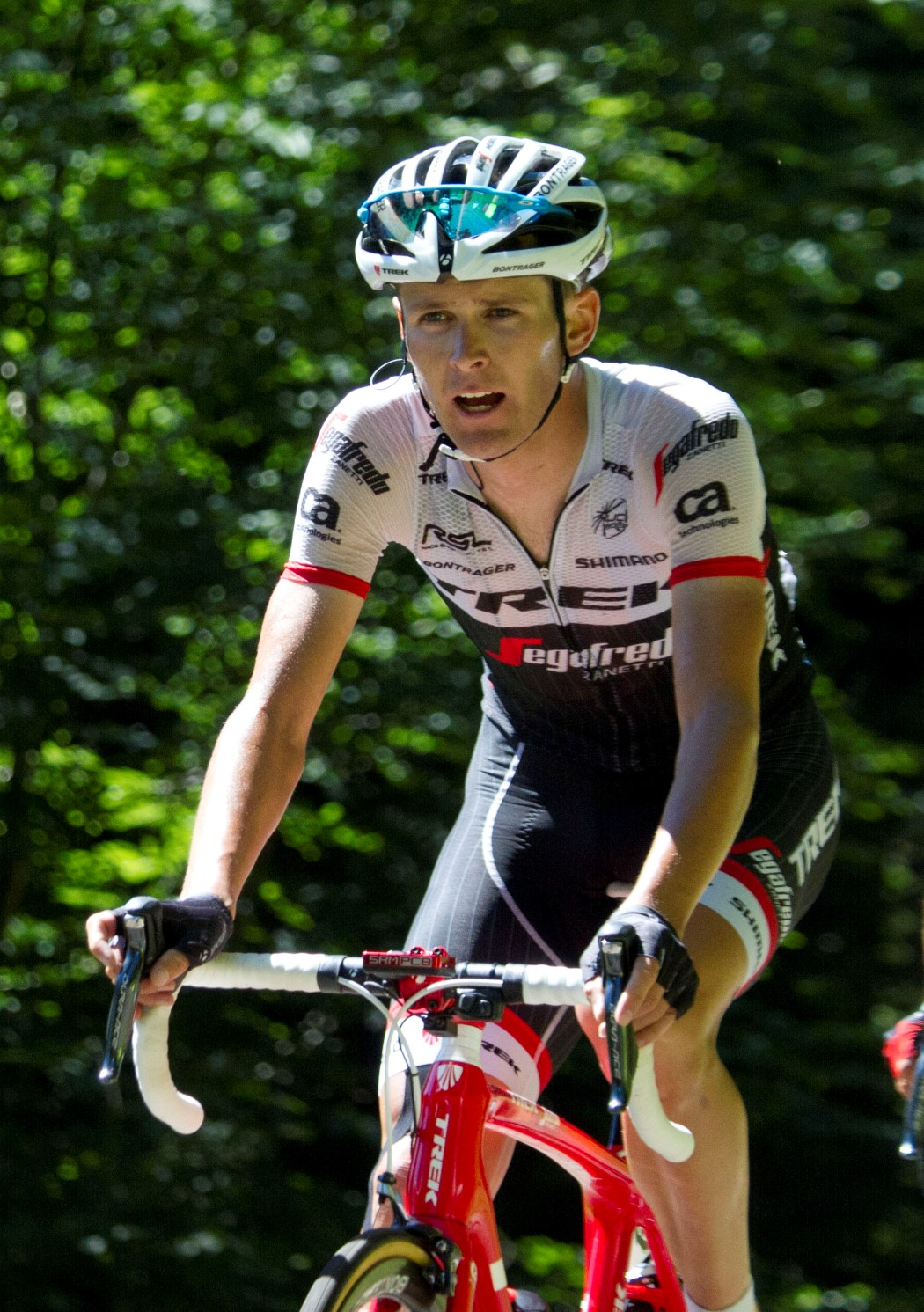
- Stetina at the 2016 Tour de France

Personal information
- Full name: Peter Stetina
- Born: August 8, 1987 (age 39) Boulder, Colorado, U.S.
- Height: 1.80 m (5 ft 11 in)
- Weight: 63.5 kg (140 lb)

Cycling career
- Sport: Cycling
- Current team: Privateer
- Disciplines: Road; Gravel; Mountain biking
- Role: Rider
- Rider type: Climber

Amateur teams
- 2007: Slipstream–Chipotle (stagiaire)
- 2008–2010: VMG Felt U23
- 2020–: Privateer

Professional teams
- 2010–2013: Garmin–Transitions
- 2014–2015: BMC Racing Team
- 2016–2019: Trek–Segafredo

Peter Stetina (born August 8, 1987) is an American off-road cyclist, who competes in gravel and endurance mountain bike racing as a privateer. Prior to this, he competed as a road racing cyclist between 2010 and 2019 for the Garmin–Sharp, BMC Racing Team and Trek–Segafredo teams.

== Career ==
Born in Boulder, Colorado, Stetina currently resides in California. Stetina's father Dale, and uncle Wayne are former road racing cyclists. Following an eight-year stint with Garmin–Sharp, Stetina signed with BMC Racing Team for the 2014 and 2015 seasons.

In April 2015, at the Tour of the Basque Country, Stetina suffered a broken knee cap and four broken ribs on the first stage. On the run-in to the finish, he slammed into a metal pole on the side of the road. His team blamed the organizers for poor rider safety measures. In August 2015 it was announced that Stetina would join former Garmin teammate Ryder Hesjedal at Trek–Segafredo on an initial one-year deal for 2016, with a role supporting Hesjedal and Bauke Mollema as a domestique whilst having the opportunity to lead the team in American races.

== Major results ==
2005
1st Road race, National Junior Road Championships
2008
National Under-23 Road Championships

1st Time trial
2nd Road race

6th Time trial, UCI Under-23 Road World Championships
6th Overall Flèche du Sud
9th Liège–Bastogne–Liège U23
10th Overall Tour de l'Avenir
10th Redlands Bicycle Classic
2009
1st Time trial, National Under-23 Road Championships
1st Young rider classification Vuelta Mexico Telmex
2nd Overall Tour of the Gila
6th Overall Ronde de l'Isard

1st Stage 2

7th Overall Tour de l'Avenir
9th Liège–Bastogne–Liège U23
2010
1st Mount Evans Hill Climb
10th Trofeo Melinda
2012
1st Stage 2 (TTT) Tour of Utah
1st Stage 4 (TTT) Giro d'Italia
9th Overall USA Pro Cycling Challenge

1st Most Aggressive

2013
3rd GP Miguel Induráin
4th Overall Tour de Langkawi
2014
6th Overall Tour of California
8th Overall Tour de San Luis
2015
5th La Drôme Classic
2017
5th Overall Colorado Classic
6th Overall Cascade Cycling Classic

1st Stage 3

10th Milano–Torino
2018
8th Overall Adriatica Ionica Race
10th Overall Tour of Utah
2019
1st Overall 2019 Belgian Waffle Ride California
9th Overall Tour of Utah
28th Overall 2019 Vuelta a España

=== Grand Tour general classification results timeline ===
Grand Tour	2011	2012	2013	2014	2015	2016	2017	2018	2019
Giro d'Italia	21	27	52	—	—	—	46	—	—
Tour de France	—	—	—	35	—	46	—	—	—
Vuelta a España	—	—	—	—	—	—	31	—	28

Legend
—	Did not compete
DNF	Did not finish
