= 2007 Bay Classic Series =

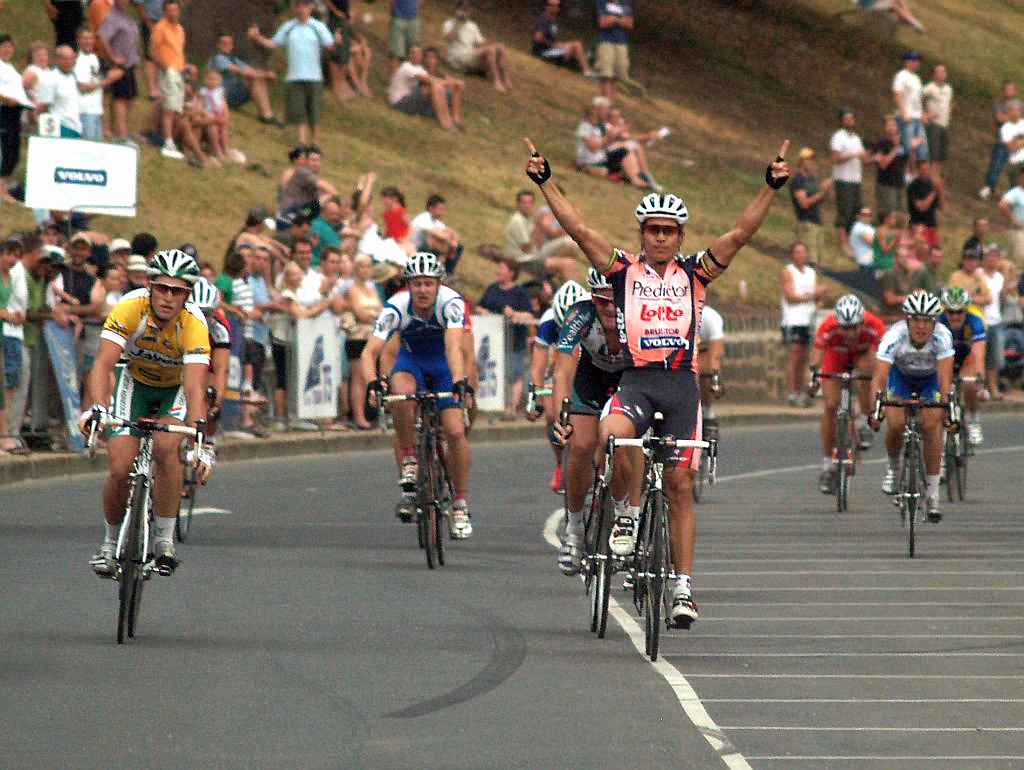
Robbie McEwen wins the Stage 3 criterium from overall leader Mark Renshaw.

The 2007 Bay Classic Series was a series of criterium road cycling races held from 3 to 7 January 2007 around the west of Port Phillip Bay in Victoria, Australia.

The men's stages were approximately one-hour criteriums (45 minutes plus 10 laps) with three sprints at 15-minute intervals. The women's stages were approximately 45-minute criteriums (30 minutes plus 10 laps) with two sprints at 15-minute intervals. Points were awarded to the first 10 riders at the finish (12, 10, 8 to 1). Points were awarded in the intermediate sprints to the first three places (3, 2 & 1 points) towards a separate sprint classification. A team classification was calculated from the points of the highest ranked three riders in each team of five.

== Men's results ==
=== Men's stage summary ===
Stage	Date	Location	Stage Top 3	Leading Top 3
1	3 January	Williamstown	(Australia) Jonathan Clarke (Australia) Robbie Williams (Australia) Mark Renshaw	(Australia) Jonathan Clarke (Australia) Robbie Williams (Australia) Mark Renshaw
2	4 January	Portarlington	(Australia) Mark Renshaw (Australia) Simon Gerrans (Australia) Darren Lapthorne	(Australia) Mark Renshaw (Australia) Jonathan Clarke (Australia) Rory Sutherland
3	5 January	Ritchie Boulevard, Geelong	(Australia) Robbie McEwen (Australia) Mark Renshaw (Australia) Rory Sutherland	(Australia) Mark Renshaw (Australia) Rory Sutherland (Australia) Jonathan Clarke
4	6 January	Botanic Gardens, Geelong	(Australia) Dean Windsor (Australia) David McPartland (Australia) Johnny Walker	(Australia) Mark Renshaw (Australia) Rory Sutherland (Australia) Dean Windsor
5	7 January	Melbourne Docklands	(Australia) Simon Gerrans (Australia) Robert McLachlan (Australia) Cameron Meyer	(Australia) Mark Renshaw (Australia) Simon Gerrans (Australia) Rory Sutherland

=== Men's top 10 overall ===
Pos	Rider	Points
1	Mark Renshaw	35
2	Simon Gerrans	25
3	Rory Sutherland	23
4	Dean Windsor	22
5	Robbie McEwen	22
6	Jonathan Clarke	19
7	David McPartland	18
8	Joel Pearson	15
9	Robert McLachlan	13
10	Evan Oliphant	13

== Women's results ==
=== Women's stage summary ===
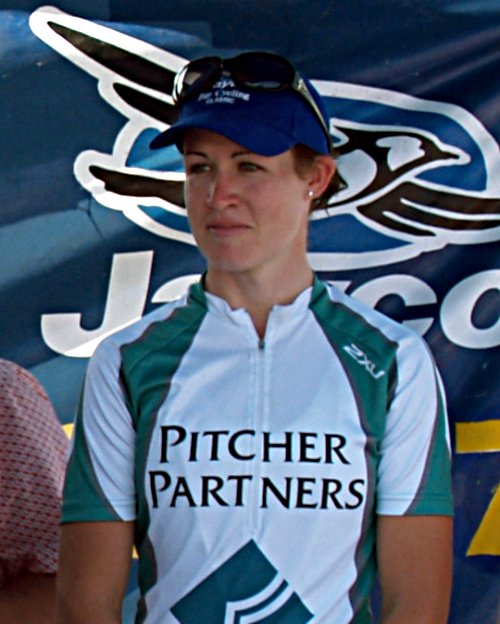
Kate Bates after finishing second in the second stage

Stage	Date	Location	Stage Top 3	Leading Top 3
1	3 January	Williamstown	(Australia) Kate Bates (Australia) Belinda Goss (Australia) Nikki Egyed	(Australia) Kate Bates (Australia) Belinda Goss (Australia) Nikki Egyed
2	4 January	Portarlington	(Australia) Belinda Goss (Australia) Kate Bates (Australia) Nikki Egyed	(Australia) Kate Bates (Australia) Belinda Goss (Australia) Nikki Egyed
3	5 January	Ritchie Boulevard, Geelong	(Australia) Alexis Rhodes (Australia) Jennie McPherson (Australia) Kate Bates	(Australia) Kate Bates (Australia) Belinda Goss (Australia) Nikki Egyed
4	6 January	Botanic Gardens, Geelong	(Australia) Alexis Rhodes (Australia) Kate Bates (Australia) Belinda Goss	(Australia) Kate Bates (Australia) Belinda Goss (Australia) Alexis Rhodes
5	7 January	Melbourne Docklands	(Australia) Kate Bates (Australia) Belinda Goss (Australia) Nikki Egyed	(Australia) Kate Bates (Australia) Belinda Goss (Australia) Nikki Egyed

=== Women's top 10 overall ===
Pos	Rider	Points
1	Kate Bates	52
2	Belinda Goss	47
3	Nikki Egyed	32
4	Jo Kiesonowski	25
5	Alexis Rhodes	24
6	Jennie McPherson	23
7	Sara Carrigan	16
8	Sky-Lee Armstrong	10.5
9	Emma Rickards	10
10	Emma Mackie	7.5
