= Ben Hermans =

Belgian cyclist (born 1986)

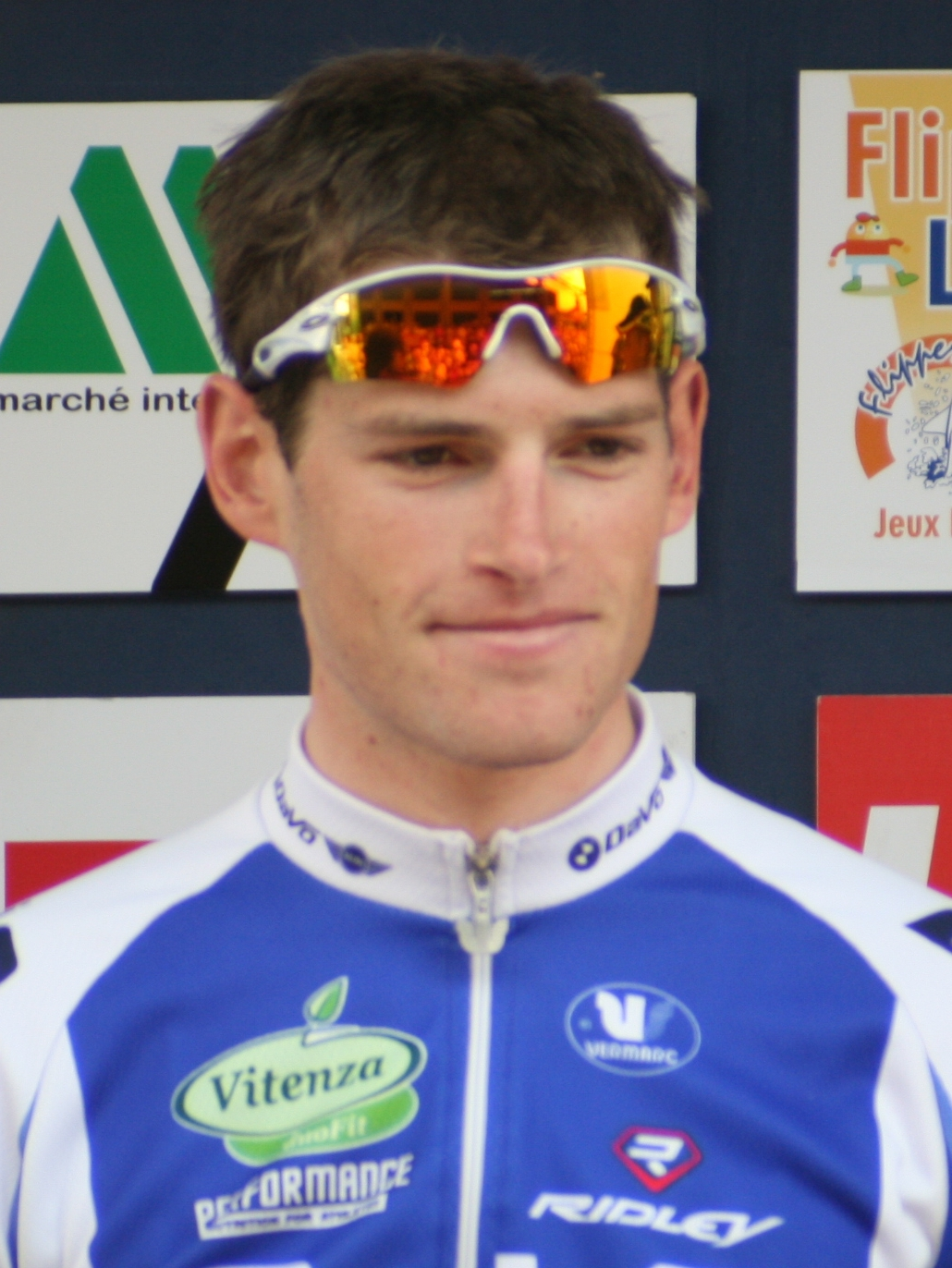
- Hermans at the 2008 Belgian National Time Trial Championships

Personal information
- Born: 8 June 1986 (age 40) Hasselt, Flanders, Belgium
- Height: 1.88 m (6 ft 2 in)
- Weight: 73 kg (161 lb)

Cycling career
- Sport: Cycling
- Discipline: Road
- Role: Rider
- Rider type: Puncheur

Amateur teams
- 1998–2000: Sport en Steun Leopoldsburg
- 2001–2003: KZLWC Sint-Truiden
- 2004: Avia
- 2005–2006: Beveren 2000
- 2007–2008: Davo

Professional teams
- 2009: Topsport Vlaanderen–Mercator
- 2010–2011: Team RadioShack
- 2012–2013: RadioShack–Nissan
- 2014–2017: BMC Racing Team
- 2018–2023: Israel Cycling Academy
- 2024: Cofidis

Major wins
- Stage races Tour of Oman (2017) Tour of Utah (2019) Arctic Race of Norway (2021) One-day races and Classics Brabantse Pijl (2015)

Ben Hermans (born 8 June 1986) is a Belgian former road racing cyclist, who competed as a professional from 2009 to 2024.

== Career ==
Hermans was born in Hasselt, Flanders, and he turned professional in 2009 with Topsport Vlaanderen–Mercator.

Hermans left RadioShack–Leopard at the end of the 2013 season, and joined the BMC Racing Team for the 2014 season. In April 2015, he won the Belgian classic Brabantse Pijl with a late attack and resisted to the return of the peloton by a few seconds to cross the line solo. A couple of weeks later, he went on to win the third stage of the Tour de Yorkshire in solo fashion, attacking the leading group with twelve kilometers remaining. He also finished sixth overall in the race. In 2017 he won the Tour of Oman. In August 2020, he was named in the startlist for the 2020 Tour de France.

== Major results ==
2004
1st Time trial, National Junior Road Championships
3rd Overall Giro della Lunigiana
7th Road race, UCI Junior Road World Championships
2006
2nd Overall Ronde de l'Isard
4th Liège–Bastogne–Liège Espoirs
7th Overall Tour des Pyrénées
2007
10th Overall Circuit des Ardennes
10th Liège–Bastogne–Liège Espoirs
2008
1st Circuit de Wallonie
1st Grand Prix des Marbriers
2nd Time trial, National Under-23 Road Championships
6th Chrono des Nations Espoirs
2009
2nd Grand Prix of Aargau Canton
6th Grand Prix d'Ouverture La Marseillaise
7th Overall Settimana Ciclistica Lombarda
9th De Vlaamse Pijl
2010
6th Overall Tour of Belgium

1st Stage 5

9th Overall Critérium International
9th Overall Tour of Austria
2011
1st Trofeo Inca
2nd Time trial, National Road Championships
3rd Overall Tour de Wallonie
3rd Grand Prix Pino Cerami
6th Overall Giro di Sardegna
6th Binche–Tournai–Binche
8th Amstel Gold Race
9th Overall Eneco Tour
2012
2nd Time trial, National Road Championships
10th Overall Tour du Poitou-Charentes
10th Paris–Bourges
2013
5th Overall Tour Down Under
2014
4th Overall Tour of Utah
7th GP Ouest–France
9th Overall Tour Méditerranéen
9th Overall USA Pro Cycling Challenge
2015
1st Brabantse Pijl
2nd Overall Tour of Austria
3rd Overall Tour de Pologne
6th Overall Tour de Yorkshire

1st Stage 3

8th Overall Tour of Oman
9th Overall Arctic Race of Norway

1st Stage 3

2016
2nd Overall Vuelta a Burgos
3rd Time trial, National Road Championships
5th Vuelta a Murcia
7th Overall Abu Dhabi Tour
2017
1st Overall Tour of Oman

1st Stages 2 & 5

1st Stage 2 (TTT) Volta a Catalunya
2nd Overall Volta a la Comunitat Valenciana

1st Stage 1 (TTT)

3rd Time trial, National Road Championships
5th Overall Tour of Guangxi
10th Giro dell'Emilia
2018
1st Overall Tour of Austria

1st Stage 3

2nd Overall Tour of Utah
4th Overall Okolo Slovenska
9th Trofeo Laigueglia
2019
1st Overall Tour of Utah

1st Stages 2 & 3

1st Overall Tour of Austria

1st Stage 4

2nd Overall Adriatica Ionica Race

1st Mountains classification

3rd Volta Limburg Classic
8th Overall Tour of Slovenia
2020
7th Overall Vuelta a Burgos
9th Giro di Lombardia
2021
1st Overall Arctic Race of Norway

1st Stage 3

1st Giro dell'Appennino
1st Stage 4 (ITT) Tour Poitou-Charentes en Nouvelle-Aquitaine
2nd Overall Tour de Hongrie
3rd Gran Premio di Lugano
6th Overall Settimana Internazionale di Coppi e Bartali

1st Stage 1b (TTT)

8th Road race, UEC European Road Championships
8th Overall Settimana Ciclistica Italiana
9th Giro dell'Emilia
2023
4th Overall Tour of Hainan
8th Overall Tour of Belgium
9th Eschborn–Frankfurt
2024
8th Overall Tour de l'Ain
9th Giro della Toscana

=== Grand Tour general classification results timeline ===
Grand Tour	2012	2013	2014	2015	2016	2017	2018	2019	2020
Giro d'Italia	73	—	72	—	—	DNF	45	—	—
Tour de France	—	—	—	—	—	—	—	—	68
Vuelta a España	—	61	—	—	14	—	—	—	—

Legend
—	Did not compete
DNF	Did not finish
