= Brendon Davids =

South African cyclist (born 1993)

Personal information
- Full name: Brendon Davids
- Born: 4 February 1994 (age 32) Pietermaritzburg, South Africa
- Height: 1.83 m (6 ft 0 in)
- Weight: 72 kg (159 lb)

Cycling career
- Sport: Cycling
- Current team: Team Brennan
- Disciplines: Road; Mountain biking
- Role: Rider

Amateur teams
- 2017: Oliver's Real Food Racing
- 2021–2022: Oliver's Real Food Racing

Professional teams
- 2018: Bennelong SwissWellness Cycling Team
- 2019–2020: Oliver's Real Food Racing
- 2023-2024: CCACHE x Par Küp

Brendon Davids (born 4 February 1993 in Pietermaritzburg) is a South African cyclist, who currently rides for the Australian Club Team, Team Brennan.

== Major results ==
2011
1st Junior cross-country, African Mountain Bike Championships
2013
1st Under-23 cross-country, African Mountain Bike Championships
2014
2nd Under-23 cross-country, African Mountain Bike Championships
2017
1st Overall Jelajah Malaysia

1st Stage 3

1st Overall Tour de Tweed

1st Stage 3

2nd Overall Mpumalanga Tour

1st Stage 6

10th Time trial, National Road Championships
2018
7th Overall Tour de Langkawi
2019
2nd Overall PRUride Philippines

1st Points classification
1st Stage 2

2nd Overall Tour of Gippsland
2021
4th Peaks Challenge Falls Creek
