= Vladislav Kulikov (cyclist) =

Russian cyclist

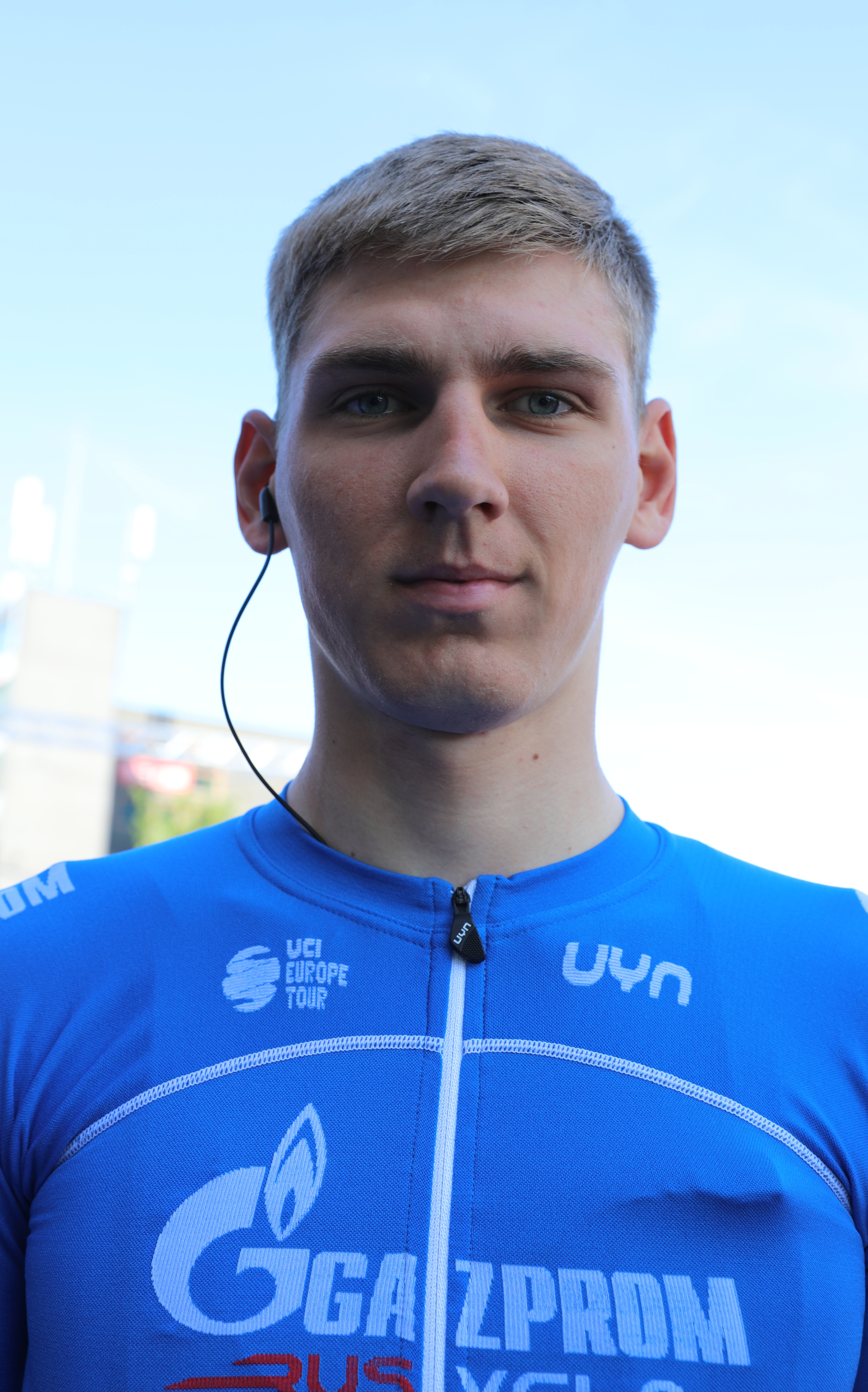
- Kulikov in 2019

Personal information
- Born: 8 July 1996 (age 30)

Cycling career
- Sport: Cycling
- Disciplines: Road; Track
- Role: Rider

Amateur teams
- 2015: MGFSO
- 2016–2017: Moscow
- 2017: MGFSO
- 2018: Moscow
- 2018: Gazprom–RusVelo (stagiaire)

Professional team
- 2019–2020: Gazprom–RusVelo

Vladislav Kulikov (born 8 July 1996) is a Russian professional racing cyclist, who most recently rode for UCI ProTeam Gazprom–RusVelo. He rode in the men's team pursuit event at the 2017 UCI Track Cycling World Championships.

== Major results ==
=== Track ===
2017
National Championships

2nd Scratch
3rd Individual pursuit
3rd Team pursuit
3rd Madison

3rd Team pursuit, 2016–17 UCI Track Cycling World Cup, Cali

=== Road ===
2018
2nd Under-23 National Time Trial Championships
6th Overall Five Rings of Moscow
2022
4th Grand Prix Mediterranean
