= Travis McCabe =

American bicycle racer

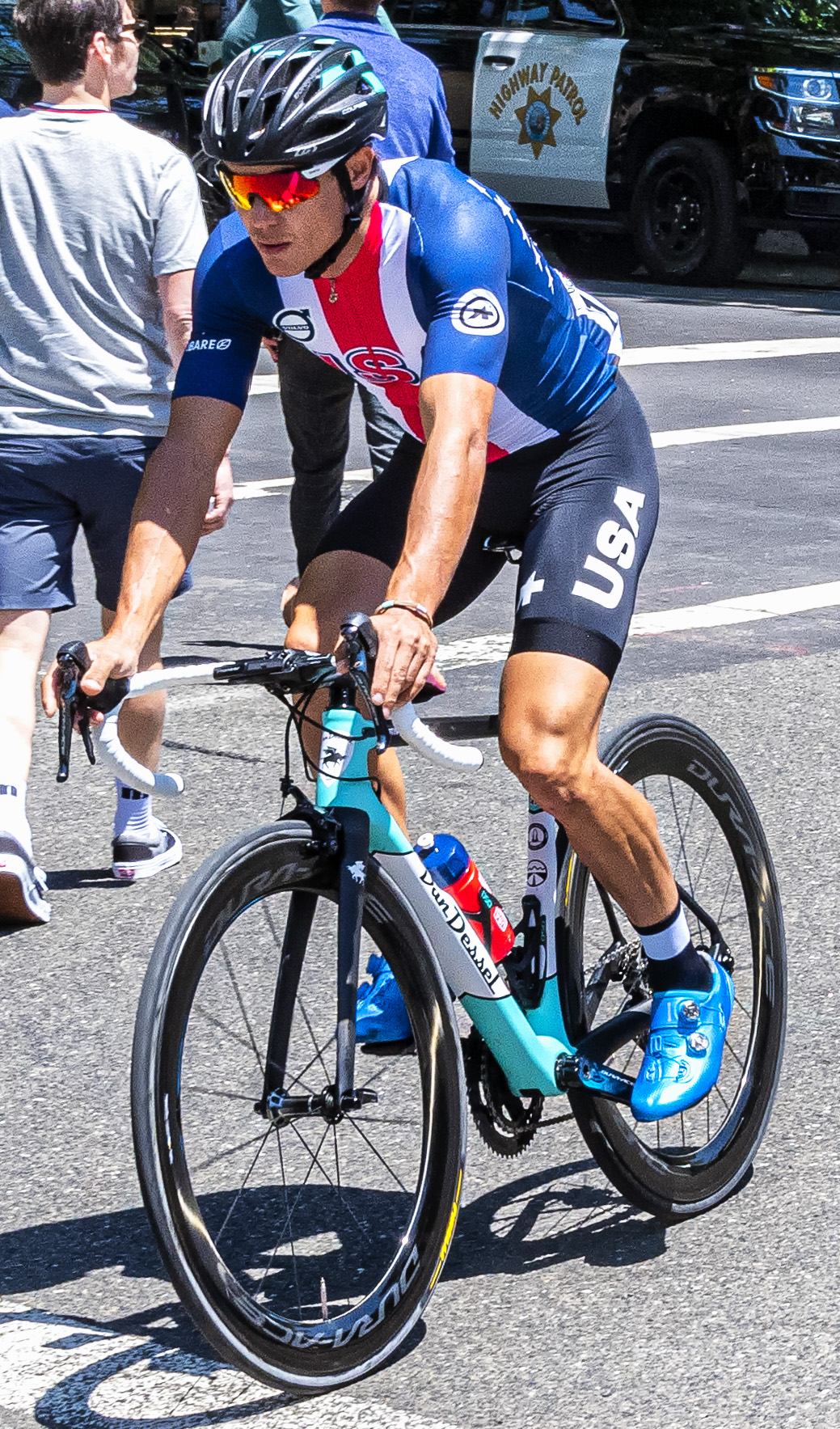
- McCabe at the 2019 Tour of California

Personal information
- Born: May 12, 1989 (age 37) Prescott, Arizona
- Height: 5 ft 9 in (175 cm)
- Weight: 154 lb (70 kg)

Cycling career
- Sport: Cycling
- Current team: Retired
- Discipline: Road
- Role: Rider

Amateur teams
- 2011: DRC De Mol
- 2012: Landis/Trek Prescott
- 2013: Elbowz Racing-Boneshaker Project
- 2021: Best Buddies Racing

Professional teams
- 2013–2015: Team Smartstop–Mountain Khakis
- 2016: Holowesko Citadel Racing Team
- 2017–2018: UnitedHealthcare
- 2019: Floyd's Pro Cycling
- 2020: Israel Start-Up Nation

Travis McCabe (born May 12, 1989 in Prescott, Arizona) is an American former professional cyclist, who rode professionally between 2013 and 2020, for the Team SmartStop, Holowesko Citadel Racing Team, UnitedHealthcare, Floyd's Pro Cycling and Israel Start-Up Nation teams.

== Career ==
Signing with UnitedHealthcare in 2017, was McCabe's first time stepping up to the Pro-Continental level, although he had already established himself as a top domestic sprinter. His stage wins at the Tour de Langkawi and the Jayco Herald Sun Tour were his first professional victories outside of the U.S., the latter being one of the biggest victories of his career.

== Major results ==
2013
1st Stage 4 Nature Valley Grand Prix
2nd Overall Tucson Bicycle Classic
2014
1st Winston-Salem Cycling Classic
1st Stage 3 Joe Martin Stage Race
1st Stage 5 Nature Valley Grand Prix
1st Stage 3 Cascade Cycling Classic
2nd Road race, National Road Championships
3rd Overall Redlands Bicycle Classic

1st Stage 3

2015
7th Overall Vuelta a la Independencia Nacional
10th Philadelphia International Cycling Classic
2016
Tour of the Gila

1st Points classification
1st Stage 2

1st Stage 4 Tour of Utah
2nd Philadelphia International Cycling Classic
3rd Road race, National Road Championships
5th Overall Joe Martin Stage Race

1st Stage 4

5th The Reading 120
7th Winston-Salem Cycling Classic
2017
1st Criterium, National Road Championships
Tour of Utah

1st Points classification
1st Stage 5

Tour de Langkawi

1st Stages 2 & 8

1st Stage 3 Herald Sun Tour
1st Points classification Tour of the Gila
6th Winston-Salem Cycling Classic
10th Overall Colorado Classic

1st Points classification

2018
Tour of Utah

1st Points classification
1st Stages 1 & 3

1st Stage 4 Colorado Classic
2019
1st Criterium, National Road Championships
1st Stage 2 Tour of the Gila
1st Points classification Tour of Utah
4th White Spot / Delta Road Race
10th Overall Tour de Langkawi

1st Points classification
1st Stage 3
