= CCACHE x BODYWRAP =

Australian cycling team

Team information
- UCI code: CBW
- Registered: Australia
- Founded: 2010
- Discipline: Road
- Status: National (2010–2017, 2021–2022); UCI Continental (2018–2020, 2023–)

Key personnel
- General manager: Samuel Layzell
- Team managers: Adrian Salter, Craig Chapman

Team name history
- 2010–2012 2013–2014 2015–2022 2023–2024 2025–: Two Wheel Industries; Paradice Investment Cycling Team; Oliver's Real Food Racing; CCACHE x Par Küp; CCACHE x BODYWRAP

CCACHE x BODYWRAP is a road cycling team founded in 2010 that is based in Australia. It is the longest running cycling team in its home country & competes domestically, as well as in the UCI Asia Tour. The team gained UCI Continental status for the 2018 season, but returned to club status during the COVID-19 Pandemic. It is now managed by former rider Samuel Layzell and was originally founded in Newcastle, NSW. For season 2023 the team will operate under new naming rights sponsor CCACHE x Par Küp, regaining UCI Continental status.

== Team history ==
The team had a breakthrough season in 2017. In January Logan Griffin took second place overall to Joseph Cooper at the New Zealand Cycle Classic. Sprinter Sean Whitfield then took the team's first Union Cyclist International win at the 2.2 ranked le Tour de Filipinas in February.

The mid-season recruitment of South African Brendon Davids helped continue the team's run of success. He took the team's first Australian National Road Series win at Battle Recharge in September. This was followed by a win for Davids in the General Classification at the Union Cycliste Internationale 2.2 ranked Jelajah Malaysia. Davids won stage 3 of the race with a solo breakaway, and clinched the overall classification by 24 seconds over Colombian Víctor Niño. Teammate Ryan Thomas won the youth classification at the event.

In 2019, William Hodges won the 59th edition of the Grafton to Inverell Classic.

== Team roster ==
As of 21 April 2020.

| Rider | Date of birth |
|---|---|
| Tom Bolton (AUS) | 20 November 1998 (age 27) |
| Kai Chapman (AUS) | 20 August 1999 (age 27) |
| Fintan Conway (AUS) | 12 April 1999 (age 27) |
| Brendon Davids (RSA) | 4 February 1993 (age 33) |
| Riley Fleming (AUS) | 9 August 1999 (age 27) |
| Will Hodges (AUS) | 30 April 1997 (age 29) |
| Campbell Jones (AUS) | 25 January 1999 (age 27) |
| Angus Lyons (AUS) | 12 January 1996 (age 30) |

| Rider | Date of birth |
|---|---|
| Karl Michelin-Beard (AUS) | 14 October 1994 (age 31) |
| Conor Murtagh (AUS) | 10 July 1993 (age 33) |
| Callum Pearce (AUS) | 4 January 1998 (age 28) |
| Sebastian Presley (AUS) | 23 January 1998 (age 28) |
| Jack Sykes (AUS) | 17 February 2000 (age 26) |
| Liam White (AUS) | 9 November 1994 (age 31) |
| Sean Whitfield (AUS) | 11 May 1995 (age 31) |

== Major results ==
2018
Stage 1 New Zealand Cycle Classic, Nicholas Reddish
2019
Stage 4 New Zealand Cycle Classic, Jesse Featonby
Stage 2 PRUride PH, Brendon Davids
Stage 1 Tour of Indonesia, Angus Lyons

2024
Stage 3 Tour de Taiwan, Bentley Niquet-Olden
Stage 1 Tour de Kumano, John Carter

2025
Stage 8 Tour of Japan, Liam Walsh
Stage 3 Czech Tour, Liam Walsh

2026
Stage 7 Tour of Japan, Oscar Gallagher
