= Simone Bevilacqua =

Italian cyclist (born 1997)

Personal information
- Born: 22 February 1997 (age 29) Thiene, Italy
- Height: 1.80 m (5 ft 11 in)
- Weight: 75 kg (165 lb)

Cycling career
- Sport: Cycling
- Current team: Retired
- Discipline: Road
- Role: Rider

Amateur teams
- 2016: Team Colpack
- 2017: Zalf–Euromobil–Désirée–Fior

Professional teams
- 2018–2021: Wilier Triestina–Selle Italia
- 2022–2023: Eolo–Kometa

Simone Bevilacqua (born 22 February 1997) is an Italian former cyclist, who competed as a professional from 2018 to 2023. In October 2020, he was named in the startlist for the 2020 Giro d'Italia.

== Major results ==
2015
1st Time trial, Junior National Road Championships
1st G.P. dell'Arno
2nd Road race, Junior National Road Championships
2nd Gran Premio Sportivi di Sovilla
2017
8th Popolarissima
2019
1st Stage 7 Tour de Langkawi

=== Grand Tour general classification results timeline ===
Grand Tour	2020
Giro d'Italia	127
Tour de France	—
Vuelta a España	—

Legend
—	Did not compete
DNF	Did not finish
