= Sam Crome =

Australian cyclist (born 1993)

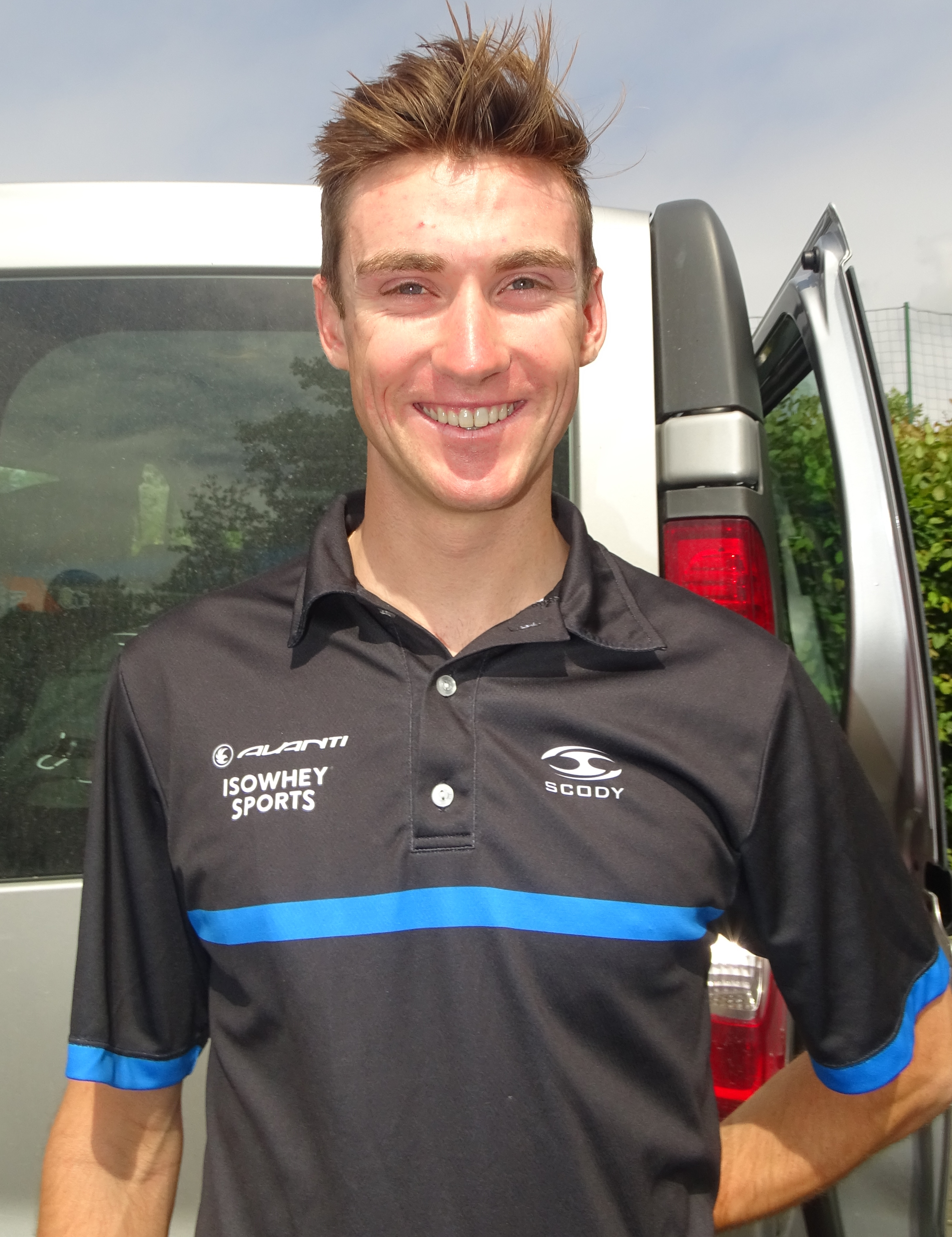
- Crome in 2016

Personal information
- Full name: Sam Crome
- Born: 16 December 1993 (age 32) Bendigo, Australia

Cycling career
- Sport: Cycling
- Discipline: Road
- Role: Rider

Amateur team
- 2013–2015: Charter Mason Racing

Professional teams
- 2016–2018: Avanti IsoWhey Sports
- 2019–2020: Team UKYO
- 2021–2023: St George Continental Cycling Team

Sam Crome (born 16 December 1993) is an Australian cyclist, who last rode for UCI Continental team St George Continental Cycling Team.

== Career ==
Crowe was born in Bendigo.

In 2016, Crome joined UCI Continental team Avanti IsoWhey Sports and won the eighth and final stage of the Tour of Japan.

Crome won the second stage at the 2017 New Zealand Cycle Classic. He also won the mountain classification at the Tour of Hainan.

In 2018, Crome won the fourth and final stage at the Herald Sun Tour.

== Major results ==
2015
10th Road race, Oceania Under-23 Road Championships
2016
1st Stage 8 Tour of Japan
6th The REV Classic
10th Road race, Oceania Road Championships
2017
1st Mountains classification Tour of Hainan
5th Overall New Zealand Cycle Classic

1st Stage 2

5th Hong Kong Challenge
2018
4th Overall Tour of China I
6th Overall Tour of Japan
7th Overall Herald Sun Tour

1st Stage 4

2019
2nd Overall Tour de Hokkaido
5th Overall Tour de Kumano
6th Overall Tour of Japan
7th Overall Tour de Langkawi
