= Angus Morton =

Australian bicycle racer

Personal information
- Full name: Angus Morton
- Nickname: Gus
- Born: 11 July 1989 (age 37) Sydney, Australia
- Height: 1.80 m (5 ft 11 in)
- Weight: 74 kg (163 lb)

Cycling career
- Sport: Cycling
- Current team: Retired
- Discipline: Road
- Role: Rider
- Rider type: All-rounder

Amateur team
- 2008: Drapac Porsche Development

Professional teams
- 2008–2010: Drapac–Porsche Development Program
- 2015–2017: Jelly Belly–Maxxis

Angus Morton (born 11 July 1989 in Sydney) is an Australian former professional cyclist. He raced for Drapac Professional Cycling from 2008 to 2010 and Jelly Belly p/b Maxxis from 2015 to 2017.

He is an experienced director, producer and editor.

== Major results ==
2010
7th Road race, National Under-23 Road Championships
2014
3rd Overall Jelajah Malaysia
2015
7th Road race, National Road Championships
2016
8th Overall Tour de Beauce
10th Overall Tour of Alberta
