= Angus Lyons =

Australian bicycle racer

Personal information
- Full name: Angus Lyons
- Born: 12 January 1996 (age 30) Ballarat, Australia
- Height: 1.8 m (5 ft 11 in)

Cycling career
- Sport: Cycling
- Discipline: Road
- Role: Rider

Amateur team
- 2017: Mobius Future Racing

Professional teams
- 2018: Mobius–BridgeLane
- 2019–2020: Oliver's Real Food Racing
- 2021–2022: ARA Pro Racing Sunshine Coast

Angus Lyons (born 12 January 1996) is an Australian cyclist, who last rode for UCI Continental team ARA Pro Racing Sunshine Coast.

In 2019, Lyons won the first stage of the Tour of Indonesia, enabling him to also wear the leader's jersey. Lyons also won the mountains classification at both the Tour de Langkawi and the Tour de Tochigi.

== Major results ==
2013
7th Time trial, Oceania Junior Road Championships
2014
3rd Time trial, National Junior Road Championships
2015
Oceania Under-23 Road Championships

7th Time trial
8th Road race

2016
6th Time trial, Oceania Under-23 Road Championships
2017
5th Time trial, Oceania Under-23 Road Championships
2018
6th Road race, Oceania Road Championships
6th Overall Joe Martin Stage Race

1st Young rider classification

7th Gravel and Tar
2019
1st Mountains classification, Tour de Langkawi
1st Mountains classification, Tour de Tochigi
2nd Overall Tour de Indonesia

1st Stage 1

3rd Overall Tour de Filipinas
2022
5th Gullegem Koerse
