= Japan Cycling Federation =

National governing body of cycle racing in Japan

- Sport: Cycle racing
- Abbreviation: JCF
- Founded: 1995
- Affiliation: UCI
- Regional affiliation: ACC

Official website
- www.jcf.or.jp
- (Japan)

The Japan Cycling Federation (in Japanese: 日本自転車競技連盟), abbreviated to JCF is the national governing body of cycle racing in Japan. It was established in 1995 to cover both amateur and professional cycle racing.

It is a member of the UCI and the Asian Cycling Confederation.

== History ==
- 1908 - Japan's first cycling umbrella organization, the "Tokyo Wheel Association" was established.
- 1931 - The first full cycling championships (the Amateur Cycling Championships) was held in Osaka.
- 1934 - Umbrella organization for amateur sport, "Japan Cycle Sports Federation" was established.
- 1936 - Became UCI member, renamed "Japanese Bicycle Federation".
- 1943 - Bicycle Federation absorbed into "Japan Olympic Committee Bicycle Committee".
- 1945 - Japanese Bicycle Federation reformed.
- 1948 - Racing started.
- 1949 - Japanese Bicycle Federation renamed to "Japan Cycling Federation" (JKR), and re-joins UCI. Japan Amateur Sports Association rules will not be responsible for the Pro League.
- 1957 - Japanese Cycling Federation (FJC: Federation Japonaise du Cyclisme) was established. UCI member. The traditional Japanese Cycling Federation reorganised into "Japanese Amateur Cycling Federation" (JACF). "Japan Professional Cycling Federation" (JPCF) founded. Both groups part of FJC. Cycling World Championships hosted.
- 1965 - Following International Olympic Committee (IOC) recommendations, UCI umbrella "International Amateur Cycling Federation (FIAC)" and "International Professional Cycling Federation (FICP)" were established. The Japanese amateur and professional cycling federations affiliated themselves respectively. FJC took the role of representation to other international organizations.
- 1975 - Japanese Amateur Cycling Federation separated.
- 1988 - FJC dissolved.
- 1992 - FIAC/FICP remerged into UCI.
- 1995 - Japanese Amateur Cycling Federation and Japanese Professional Cycling Federation merge, "Japan Cycling Federation" (JCF) launched.
- 1996 - World Masters Championships hosted.
- 1998 - First Japanese National Cycling Championships held (Japan's national open championship).

== Races ==
JCF organizes following cycling events every year, including:

- Japanese National Road Race Championships
- Japanese National Time Trial Championships
- Inter-Prefectural Cycling Championships
- Japan Proferssional Track Cycling Championship
- Inter-High School Cycling Championships
- Japanese Cycling National Junior and Youth Track Championships
- Japan Track Cup
