= Nikolay Cherkasov (cyclist) =

Russian bicycle racer

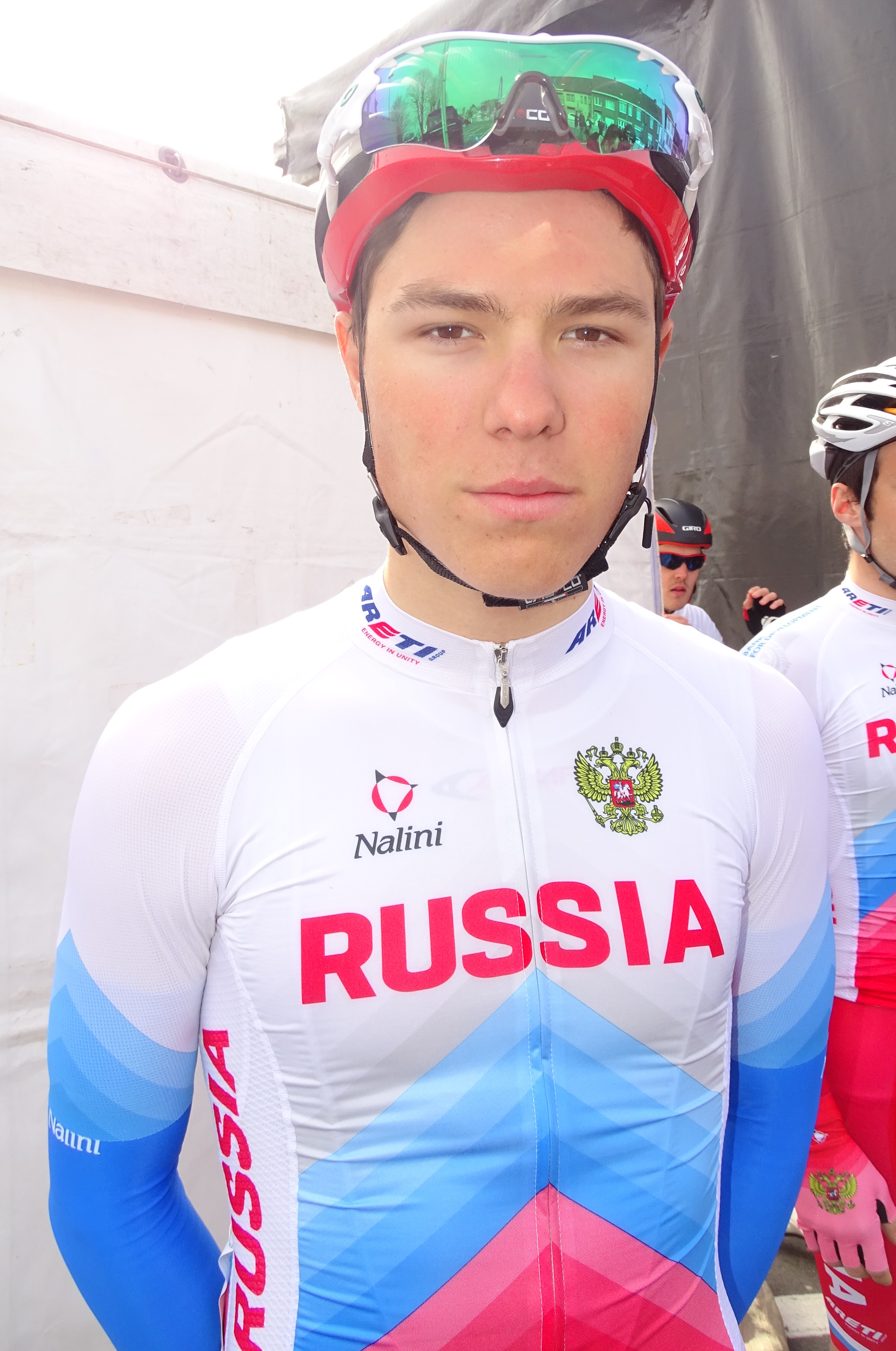
- Cherkasov in 2016.

Personal information
- Full name: Nikolay Andreyevich Cherkasov
- Born: 26 September 1996 (age 30) Omsk, Russia
- Height: 1.82 m (6 ft 0 in)
- Weight: 68 kg (150 lb)

Cycling career
- Sport: Cycling
- Discipline: Road
- Role: Rider

Amateur teams
- 2015–2016: Tyumen Region
- 2017: Gazprom–RusVelo U23

Professional teams
- 2017: Gazprom–RusVelo (stagiaire)
- 2018–2022: Gazprom–RusVelo

Nikolay Andreyevich Cherkasov (Russian: Николай Андреевич Черкасов; born 26 September 1996 in Omsk) is a Russian cyclist, who last rode for UCI ProTeam Gazprom–RusVelo.

== Major results ==
2013
1st Time trial, UEC European Junior Road Championships
1st Time trial, National Junior Road Championships
1st Stage 3 Tour du Valromey
1st Stage 2 Aubel-Thimister-La Gleize
2017
7th Overall Giro della Valle d'Aosta
9th Overall Giro Ciclistico d'Italia
2019
3rd Coppa Agostoni
3rd Giro della Toscana
4th Overall Tour of Almaty
6th Overall Tour de Langkawi
