= Edward Anderson (cyclist) =

American cyclist

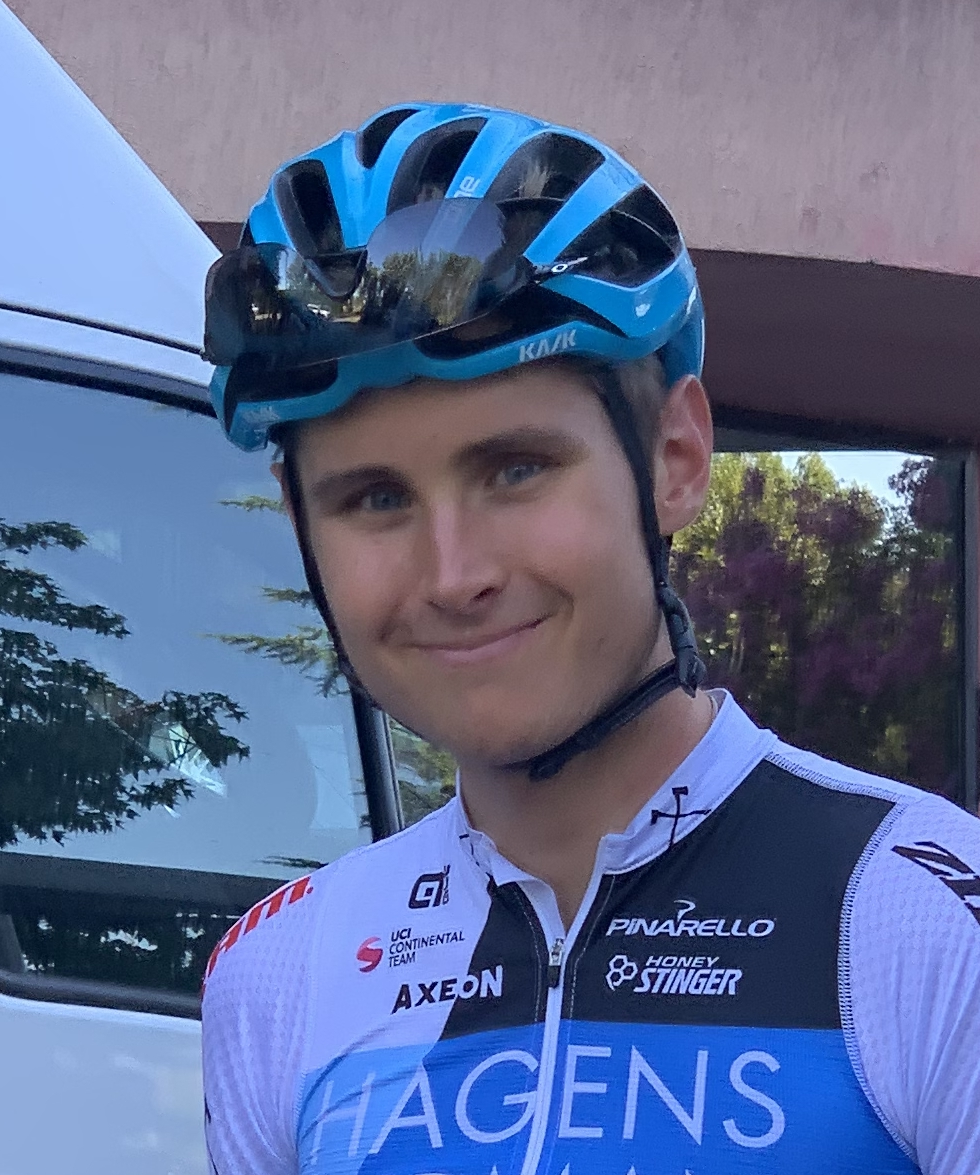
- Anderson at the 2020 Tour de l'Ain

Personal information
- Full name: Edward Anderson
- Born: April 18, 1998 (age 28) Richmond, Virginia
- Height: 1.88 m (6 ft 2 in)

Cycling career
- Sport: Cycling
- Current team: Alpecin–Premier Tech
- Discipline: Road
- Role: Rider

Professional teams
- 2017–2020: Axeon–Hagens Berman
- 2021–2022: Alpecin–Fenix

Edward Anderson (born April 18, 1998) is a former American cyclist.
