= Brunei Continental Cycling Team =

Brunei cycling team

Team information
- UCI code: BRC
- Registered: Brunei
- Founded: 2019
- Discipline: Road
- Status: UCI Continental
- Bicycles: Factor

Team name history
- 2019: Brunei Continental Cycling Team

Brunei Continental Cycling Team (UCI team code: BRC) was a continental cycling team registered in Brunei that participated in UCI Continental Circuits races. The team was managed by Muhamad Firdaus Daud with assistance from directeurs sportifs Arnold de Leeuw, Ali Gulcan, Keith Mcrae, Yong Li Ng and Reduan Yusop.

== Team roster ==
As of 31 December 2019.

Rider	Date of birth
Burak Abay (TUR)	1 January 1996 (age 30)
Muhammad Raihaan Abd Aziz (BRU)	11 April 1988 (age 38)
Azmi Abd Hadzid (BRU)	12 September 1991 (age 34)
Chien Chou Chen (TPE)	2 December 1997 (age 28)
Martin Ford (GBR)	26 April 1974 (age 52)
Amiruddin Haji Amir (BRU)	15 October 1994 (age 31)
James Jobber (GBR)	9 January 1994 (age 32)
Charalampos Kastrantas (GRE)	13 March 1991 (age 35)

Rider	Date of birth
Alexander Parsons (RSA)	22 February 1997 (age 29)
Muhammad Nur Aiman Rosli (MAS)	22 March 1999 (age 27)
Muhammad Nurfitri Ammar Rosli (MAS)	9 January 2000 (age 26)
Dadi Suryadi (INA)	25 December 1989 (age 36)
Mehdi Tigrine (BEL)	29 October 1989 (age 36)
Ioannis Vorrias (GRE)	22 May 1985 (age 41)
Rolly Weaver (USA)	22 December 1990 (age 35)

== Major wins ==
2019
1st Overall Tour of Kosovo, Charalampos Kastrantas

Points classification, Charalampos Kastrantas
1st Stages 1, 2 & 3, Charalampos Kastrantas
