= Customs Cycling Team =

Team information
- UCI code: ACC
- Registered: Indonesia
- Founded: 2017
- Discipline: Road
- Status: National (2017); UCI Continental (2018–)

Team name history
- 2017–2018 2019–: Advan Customs Cycling Team; Customs Cycling Team

Customs Cycling Team is an Indonesian UCI Continental cycling team established in 2017.

== Team roster ==
Rider	Date of birth
Muhammad Fachri Naufal Barokah (IDN)	23 March 1998 (age 28)
Mohammad Fikri Azka (IDN)	6 November 1996 (age 29)
Jefri Irawan (IDN)	26 January 1994 (age 32)
Maulana Fahrizal Kurniawan (IDN)	22 May 1998 (age 28)
Eko Bayu Nurhidayah (IDN)	13 July 1990 (age 36)
Heksa Priya Prasetya (IDN)	26 June 1983 (age 43)
Luki Setiawan (IDN)	17 June 1995 (age 31)
Endra Wijaya (IDN)	1 September 1986 (age 40)
Muhammad Yudha (IDN)	7 June 1997 (age 29)
