= Floyd's Pro Cycling =

Team information
- UCI code: FPC
- Registered: Canada
- Founded: 2019
- Disbanded: 2019
- Discipline: Road
- Status: UCI Continental

Team name history
- 2019: Floyd's Pro Cycling

Floyd's Pro Cycling was a Canadian UCI Continental cycling team established in 2019. The team disbanded at the end of the 2019 season as they could not find a new title sponsor.

The team was created by former cyclist Floyd Landis after receiving 1.1 million dollars from the federal government as part of the Lance Armstrong doping scandal. The team was sponsored by Landis' cannabis shop, Floyd’s of Leadville.

== Team roster ==
As at 31 December 2019

Rider	Date of birth
Jonathan Clarke (AUS)	18 December 1984 (aged 35)
Alexander Cowan (CAN)	19 November 1996 (aged 23)
Noah Granigan (USA)	18 January 1996 (aged 23)
Émile Jean (CAN)	21 October 1993 (aged 26)
Travis McCabe (USA)	12 May 1989 (aged 30)
Carson Miles (CAN)	2 July 2000 (aged 19)

Rider	Date of birth
Robin Plamondon (CAN)	7 January 2000 (aged 19)
Noah Simms (CAN)	20 July 1997 (aged 22)
Jacob Sitler (USA)	18 June 1989 (aged 30)
Keegan Swirbul (USA)	2 September 1995 (aged 24)
Serghei Țvetcov (ROM)	29 December 1988 (aged 31)
Nicolas Zukowsky (CAN)	3 June 1998 (aged 21)

== Major wins ==
=== 2019 ===
Overall Tour de Taiwan, Jonathan Clarke

Stage 2, Jonathan Clarke

Stage 4 Joe Martin Stage Race, Alexander Cowan
Points classification Tour de Langkawi, Travis McCabe

Stage 3, Travis McCabe

Stage 2 Tour of the Gila, Travis McCabe
Stage 3 (ITT) Tour of the Gila, Serghei Țvetcov
Overall Grand Prix Cycliste de Saguenay, Nicolas Zukowsky
Stage 3a (ITT) Tour de Beauce, Serghei Țvetcov
