= Jonathan Clarke (cyclist) =

Australian cyclist (born 1984)

Personal information
- Full name: Jonathan Clarke
- Nickname: Jonny
- Born: 18 December 1984 (age 41) Melbourne, Victoria
- Height: 1.78 m (5 ft 10 in)
- Weight: 68 kg (150 lb)

Cycling career
- Sport: Cycling
- Current team: Wildlife Generation Pro Cycling
- Discipline: Road
- Role: Rider

Amateur team
- 2005: Navigators Insurance (stagiaire)

Professional teams
- 2006: Southaustralia.com–AIS
- 2007: Colavita–Sutter Home
- 2008: Toyota–United
- 2009: Jelly Belly Cycling Team
- 2010–2018: UnitedHealthcare–Maxxis
- 2019: Floyd's Pro Cycling
- 2020: Team Skyline
- 2021–: Wildlife Generation Pro Cycling

Jonathan Clarke (born 18 December 1984 in Melbourne) is an Australian cyclist, who currently rides for UCI Continental team Wildlife Generation Pro Cycling. He turned professional in 2006.

== Major results ==
2004
2nd Melbourne to Warrnambool Classic
2005
7th Overall Tour of Wellington
2006
3rd Road race, National Under-23 Road Championships
8th Clásica Memorial Txuma
2007
6th Overall Bay Classic Series

1st Stage 1

2015
9th Winston-Salem Cycling Classic
2016
6th Overall Herald Sun Tour
10th Overall Tour of the Gila
2017
4th Overall Sibiu Cycling Tour
7th Overall Tour of Utah
2018
2nd Overall Tour de Taiwan
2019
1st Overall Tour de Taiwan

1st Stage 2

2021
7th Overall Tour de Serbie
2022
1st Stage 1 Joe Martin Stage Race
