= Keegan Swirbul =

American cyclist (born 1995)

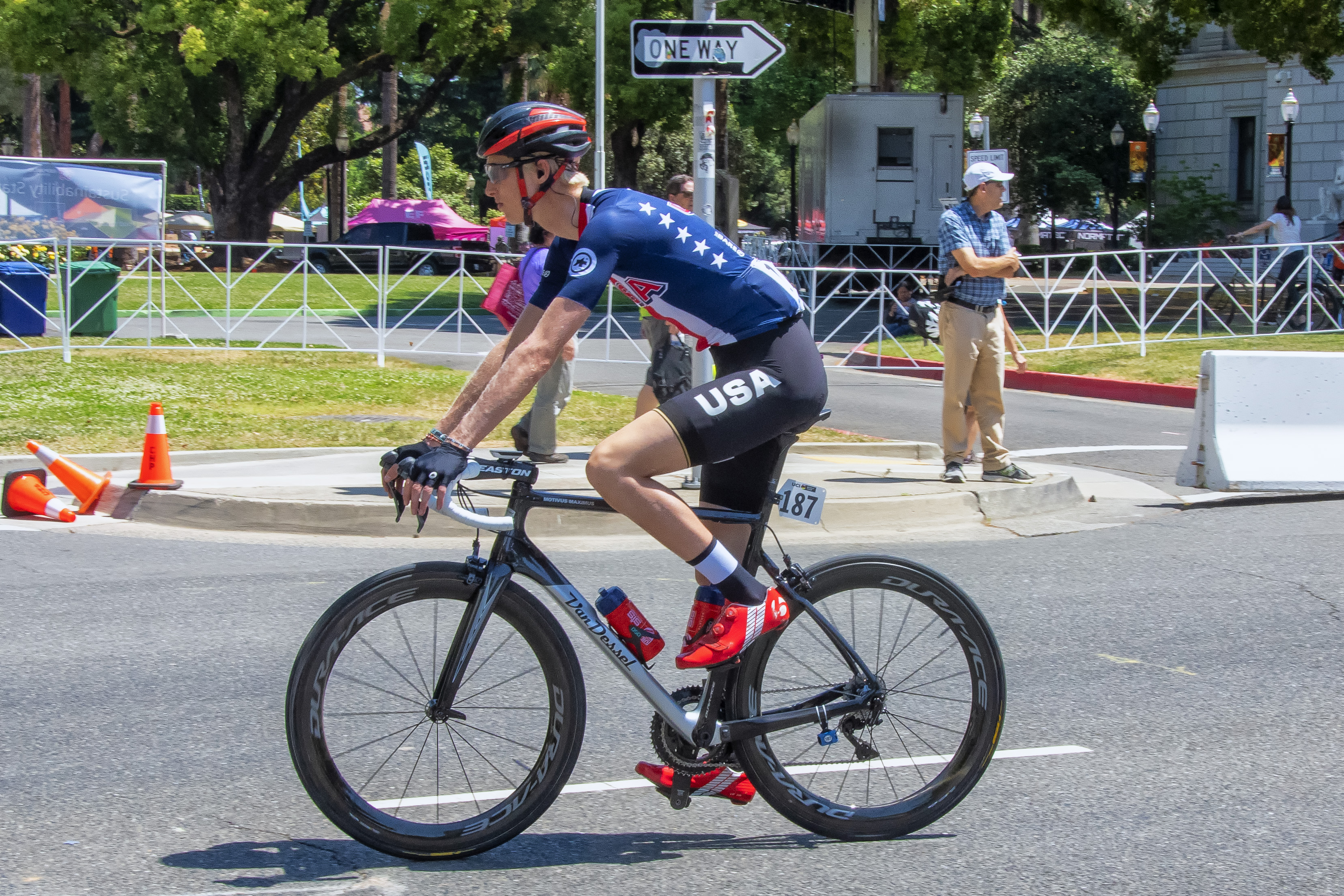

Personal information
- Full name: Keegan Swirbul
- Born: September 2, 1995 (age 31) Basalt, Colorado, United States
- Height: 1.88 m (6 ft 2 in)
- Weight: 65 kg (143 lb)

Cycling career
- Sport: Cycling
- Current team: Efapel Cycling
- Discipline: Road
- Role: Rider
- Rider type: Climber

Amateur teams
- 2016: BMC Development Team
- 2023: Vigo–Rías Baixas

Professional teams
- 2014–2015: Bissell Development Team
- 2017–2018: Jelly Belly–Maxxis
- 2019: Floyd's Pro Cycling
- 2020: Ljubljana Gusto Santic
- 2020–2022: Rally Cycling (stagiaire)
- 2023–: Efapel Cycling

Keegan Swirbul (born September 2, 1995) is an American cyclist, who currently rides for UCI Continental team Efapel Cycling.

He formerly rode for UCI ProTeam Human Powered Health. He is the older brother of cross-country skier Hailey Swirbul.

== Career ==
In 2017 and 2018, Swirbul rode for Jelly Belly–Maxxis, until the team folded at the end of 2018. With this team, he finished 7th overall in the 2018 Tour of Utah. For 2019, he signed with Floyd's Pro Cycling, a new team founded by former cyclist Floyd Landis. Floyd's Pro Cycling folded at the end of 2019, and Swirbul joined Ljubljana Gusto Santic for the 2020 season.

In October 2020, Swirbul signed a two-year contract with Rally Cycling, from the 2021 season; he had previously competed for the team as a stagiaire in 2020. Retired since 2026

== Major results ==
2014
2nd Road race, National Under-23 Road Championships
3rd Mount Evans Hill Climb
2015
1st Road race, National Under-23 Road Championships
2017
2nd Mount Evans Hill Climb
7th Overall Tour de Beauce
2018
2nd Mount Evans Hill Climb
7th Overall Tour of Utah
8th Overall Tour de Beauce
2019
1st Mount Evans Hill Climb
2nd Overall Tour de Langkawi
4th Overall Tour de Beauce
6th Overall Tour of the Gila
2026

- 1th Overall 6º GP Douro Internacional + 1 stage
