= 2015 Tour of California =

2015 UCI America Tour
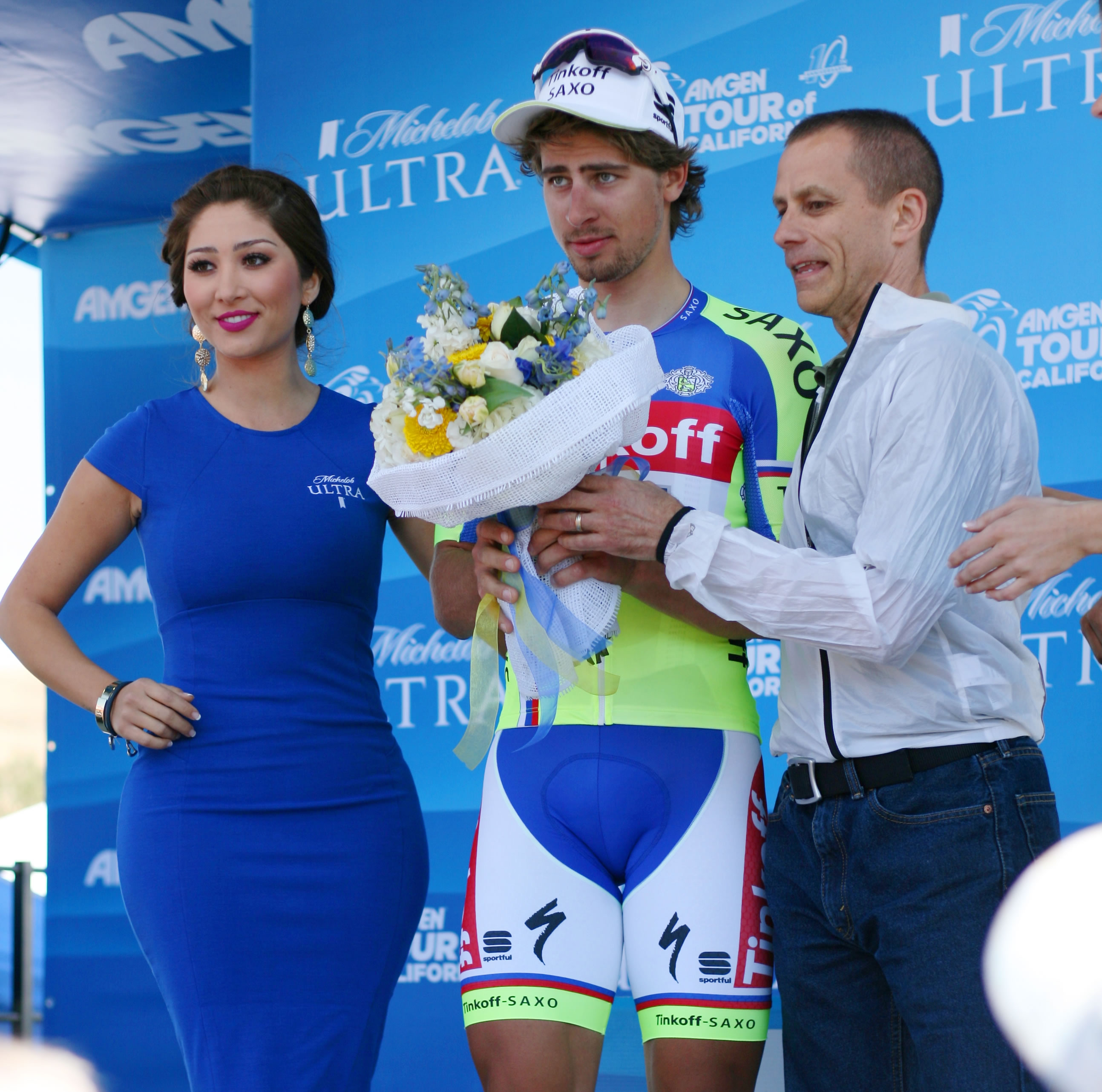
- Peter Sagan won the general classification for the first time.

Race details
- Dates: May 10–17, 2015
- Stages: 8
- Distance: 701.3 mi (1,128.6 km)
- Winning time: 28h 13' 12"

Results
Jersey awarded to the overall winner	Winner	Peter Sagan (SVK)	(Tinkoff–Saxo)
	Second	Julian Alaphilippe (FRA)	(Etixx–Quick-Step)
	Third	Sergio Henao (COL)	(Team Sky)
Jersey awarded to the mountains classification winner	Mountains	Daniel Oss (ITA)	(BMC Racing Team)
Jersey awarded to the young rider classification winner	Young rider	Julian Alaphilippe (FRA)	(Etixx–Quick-Step)
Jersey awarded to the sprints classification winner	Sprints	Mark Cavendish (GBR)	(Etixx–Quick-Step)
	Team	Team Sky	

The 2015 Amgen Tour of California was the tenth edition of the Tour of California cycling stage race. It was held from May 10–17, and rated as a 2.HC event on the UCI America Tour. It began in Sacramento and finished in Pasadena.

The race's general classification was won by Slovak Peter Sagan (Tinkoff–Saxo) by three seconds over Frenchman Julian Alaphilippe (Etixx–Quick-Step), the closest winning margin in the race's history. Sagan also won two stages during the race, including the individual time trial. Colombian Sergio Henao (Team Sky) completed the podium. The sprints competition was won by Briton Mark Cavendish (Etixx–Quick-Step), who also was the winner of four individual stages. The mountains classification jersey went to Italian Daniel Oss of BMC Racing Team, while Alaphilippe took the best young rider's jersey and the queen stage 7 and Team Sky was awarded the "best team" title. Latvian Toms Skujiņš of domestic team Hincapie Racing Team also won a stage and wore the leader's jersey for three stages.

== Schedule ==
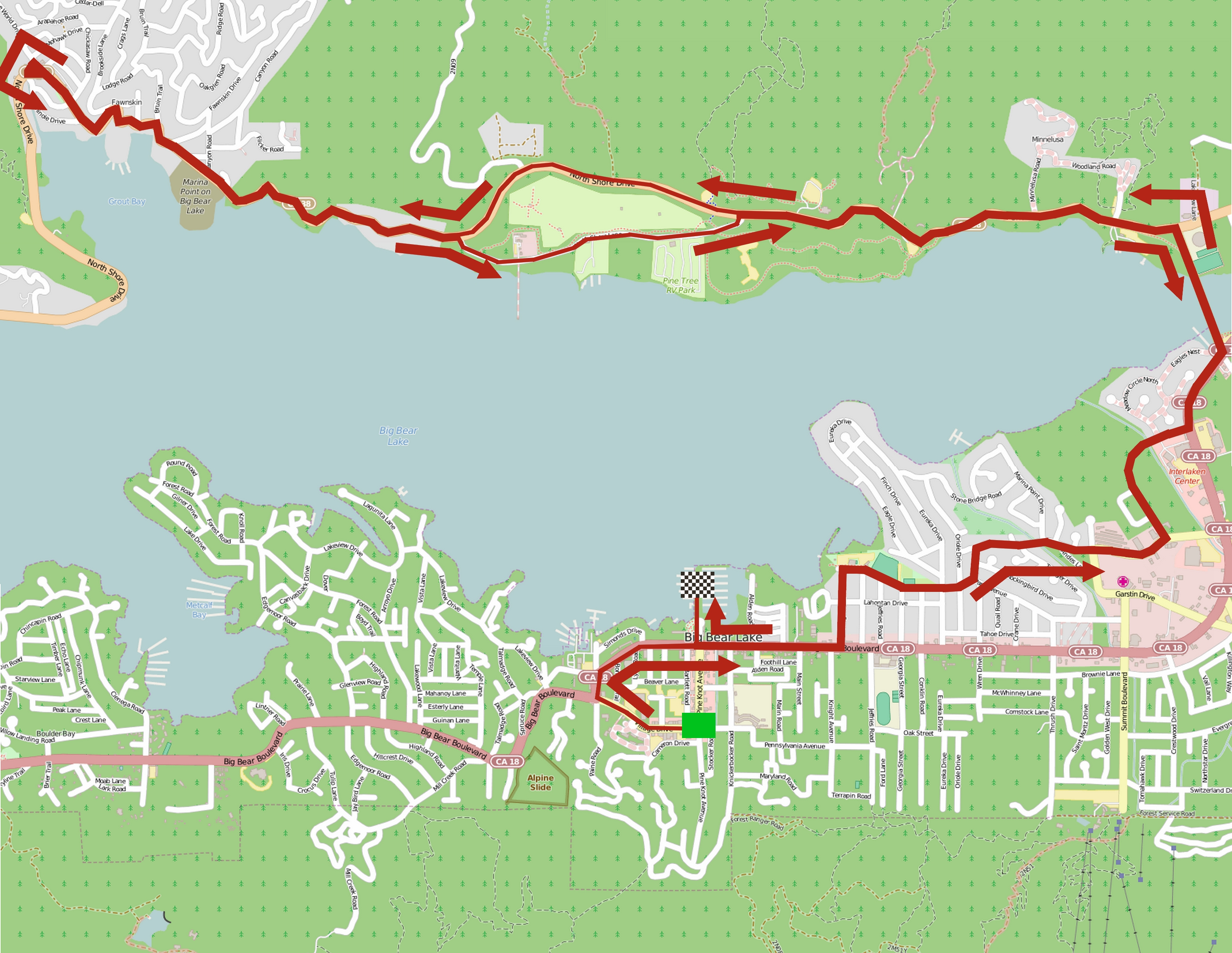
Due to expected poor weather conditions, the stage six individual time trial was moved from Big Bear Lake to Santa Clarita, and held over a reduced distance.

List of stages
Stage	Date	Course	Distance	Type	Winner
1	May 10	Sacramento to Sacramento	126.2 mi (203.1 km)	Flat stage	Mark Cavendish (GBR)
2	May 11	Nevada City to Lodi	120.4 mi (193.8 km)	Hilly stage	Mark Cavendish (GBR)
3	May 12	San Jose to San Jose	105.7 mi (170.1 km)	Hilly stage	Toms Skujiņš (LAT)
4	May 13	Pismo Beach to Avila Beach	106.9 mi (172.0 km)	Flat stage	Peter Sagan (SVK)
5	May 14	Santa Barbara to Santa Clarita	95.7 mi (154.0 km)	Hilly stage	Mark Cavendish (GBR)
6	May 15	~~Big Bear Lake to Big Bear Lake~~ (Note: The original host of the event, Big Bear Lake, was due to receive snow, so the stage was moved to Santa Clarita.); Santa Clarita to Santa Clarita	~~15.1 mi (24.3 km)~~ 6.6 mi (10.6 km)	Individual time trial	Peter Sagan (SVK)
7	May 16	Ontario to Mount Baldy	80 mi (128.7 km)	Mountain stage	Julian Alaphilippe (FRA)
8	May 17	L.A. Live to Pasadena	59 mi (95.0 km)	Flat stage	Mark Cavendish (GBR)
	Total		701.3 mi (1,129 km)		

== Teams ==
Eighteen teams were selected to take part in the race. As a 2.HC event, the race organizers could invite UCI ProTeams to make up 70% of the line-up; however, only eight ProTeams were invited, along with four UCI Professional Continental teams and six UCI Continental teams. The maximum number of riders allowed per team was eight, so the field had a maximum of 144 cyclists.

World Tour Teams

- BMC Racing Team
- Etixx–Quick-Step
- Team Sky
- Cannondale–Garmin
- Tinkoff–Saxo
- Trek Factory Racing
- Team Giant–Alpecin
- LottoNL–Jumbo

Professional Continental teams

- Drapac Professional Cycling
- MTN–Qhubeka
- UnitedHealthcare
- Team Novo Nordisk

Continental teams

- Axeon Cycling Team
- Hincapie Racing Team
- Jelly Belly–Maxxis
- Jamis–Hagens Berman
- Optum–Kelly Benefit Strategies
- Team SmartStop

== Preview and race favorites ==
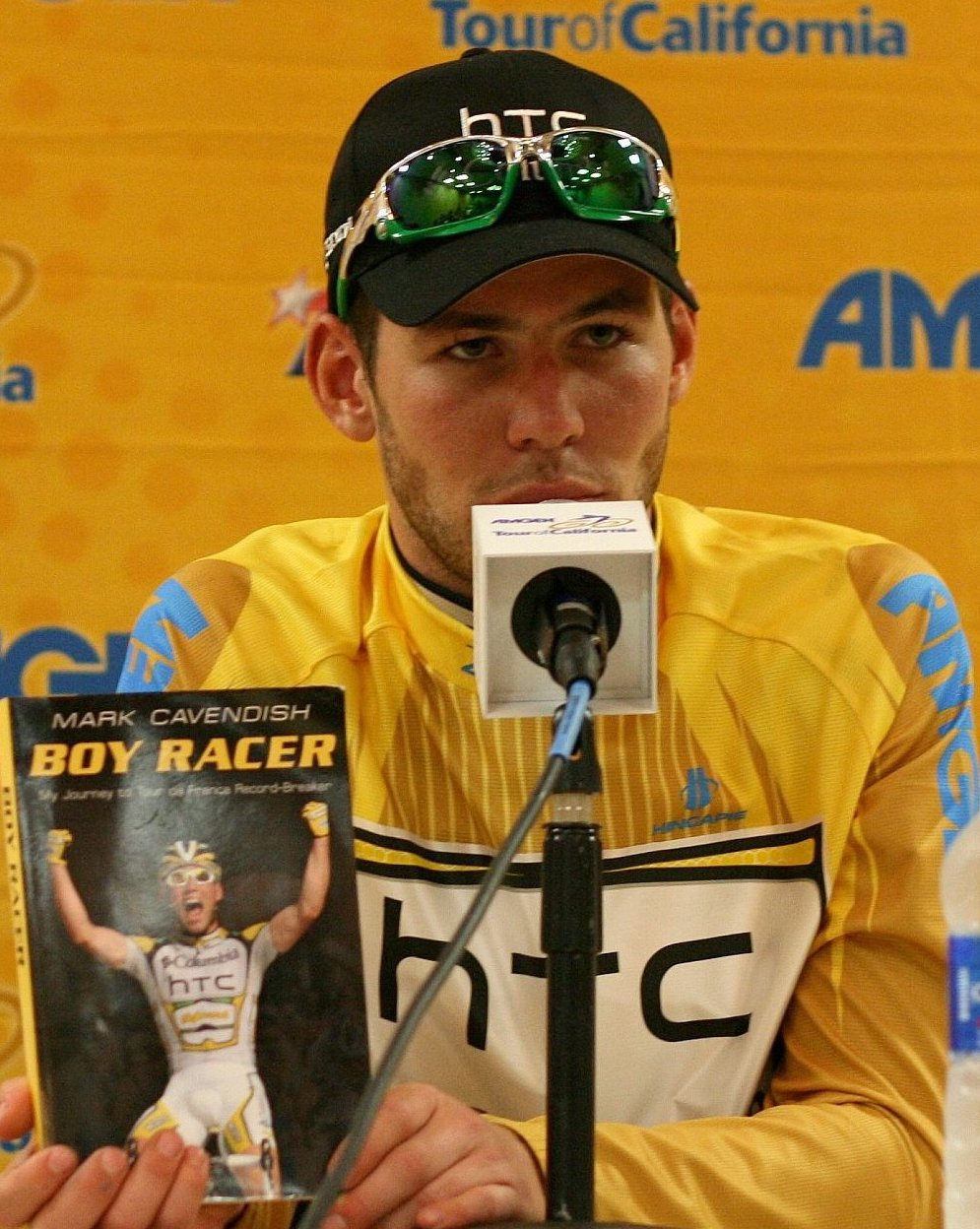
Mark Cavendish (pictured at the 2010 Tour of California), wanted to add stage wins to his tally.

As in 2014, the race followed a North to South route through California, visiting thirteen host cities. The overall classification was to be determined late in the race, notably in the time trial at Santa Clarita on Stage 6 and on the subsequent stage to Mount Baldy. The crosswinds often had an effect on the flatter stages and formed echelons of riders on the road. Former multiple Tour of California stage winner Jens Voigt was a race ambassador, served as a television analyst and was an adviser to the organizers. Anti-doping tests were conducted in-and-out of the competition by the United States Anti-Doping Agency (USADA), in agreement with the Union Cycliste Internationale (UCI). USADA's tests included researching for testosterone, CERA and human growth hormone (HGH). Subsequently, no positive tests were declared at the race nor after it.

The winner of the 2014 edition, Bradley Wiggins, did not participate in 2015 as he was going back to track cycling. The only former winner at the race was Robert Gesink of LottoNL–Jumbo, who won the race in 2012, which featured the same queen stage (Stage 7). American Andrew Talansky (Cannondale–Garmin) was designated as his team's leader, while other favorites included Team Sky's Sergio Henao who was supported by a strong Team Sky, and Haimar Zubeldia of Trek Factory Racing, who came in eighth at the 2014 Tour de France. There also was Warren Barguil, Lawson Craddock (both with Team Giant–Alpecin) and Laurens ten Dam of LottoNL–Jumbo, in support of Gesink. Outsiders included Jacques Janse van Rensburg (MTN–Qhubeka), Janez Brajkovič (UnitedHealthcare) – a former Tour de France top-10 finisher – as well as Matthew Busche (Trek Factory Racing), Rob Britton (Team SmartStop) and Phil Gaimon (Optum–Kelly Benefit Strategies).

Those who were chasing stage wins included Mark Cavendish of Etixx–Quick-Step, who came to the race with a lead-out train to facilitate his sprints, including Mark Renshaw. Peter Sagan of Tinkoff–Saxo, the record holder of most stage victories at the race with eleven and the winner of the sprints classification for the previous five years, was also a rider to watch in the sprints, especially on the hillier stages. American Tyler Farrar of MTN–Qhubeka was accompanied by other capable sprinters in his team such as Gerald Ciolek, Theo Bos and Matthew Goss. Other contenders for stage honors included Lucas Sebastián Haedo of Jamis–Hagens Berman, Danny van Poppel (Trek Factory Racing) and Guillaume Boivin (Optum–Kelly Benefit Strategies).

Ben Jacques-Maynes, who had competed in all previous editions of the race, was also on the startlist but he had to abandon after Stage 2 because of a crash.

== Stages ==
=== Stage 1 ===
May 10, 2015 — Sacramento to Sacramento, 126.2 mi (203.1 km)

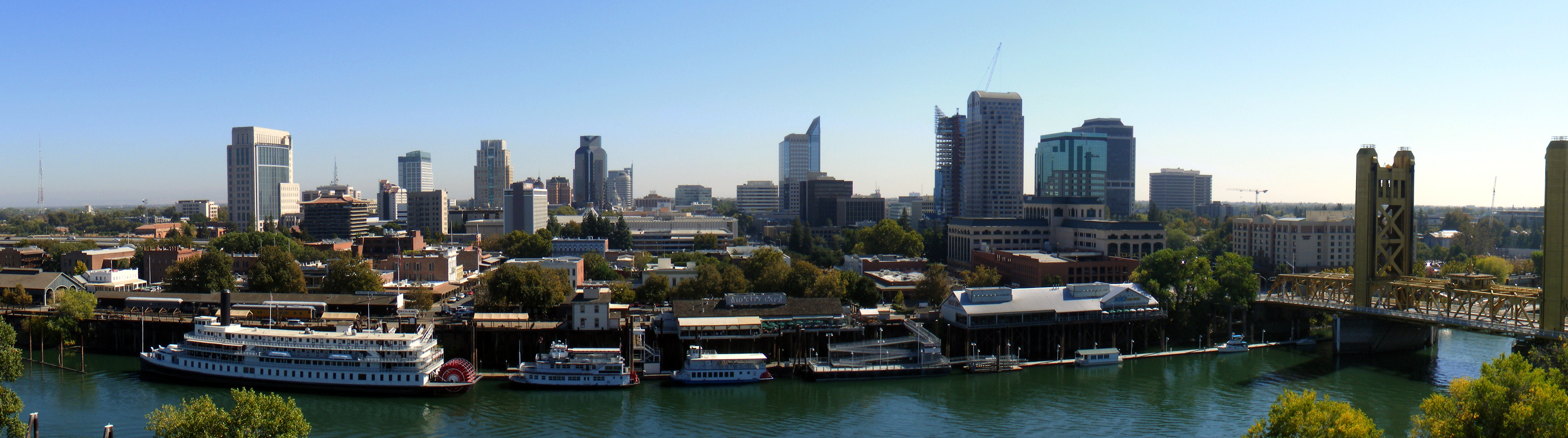
Sacramento welcomed the first stage of the race

The first stage of the race was generally pan flat and included three intermediate sprints in Walnut Grove, Isleton and West Sacramento, and a section of dirt roads starting 50 miles (80.5 kilometers) into the race and lasting 2 miles (3.2 kilometers). The stage featured an elevation gain of 1,400 feet (430 meters).

A breakaway of four riders formed early on, consisting of Will Clarke of Drapac Professional Cycling, Steve Fisher of Jelly Belly–Maxxis, recent Tour of the Gila winner Rob Britton of Team SmartStop and his teammate Robert Sweeting; this quartet's gap grew to a maximum of around six-and-a-half minutes. Soon, Etixx–Quick-Step took the reins of the bunch, controlling for their sprinter Mark Cavendish. Clarke grabbed the first points on offer for the sprints classification in Walnut Grove, and also won the second intermediate sprint, accumulating six bonus seconds towards the general classification. With about 60 miles (96.6 kilometers) to cover, one of the favorites, Andrew Talansky (Cannondale–Garmin) abandoned the race due to a combination of allergies and an upper respiratory infection.

At the front, the four riders in the break were forming a mini-echelon to shelter themselves from the winds, when Britton suffered a mechanical and decided to sit up and wait for the peloton. Mark Renshaw crashed as he hit a pothole, but was able to remount and return to the peloton. MTN–Qhubeka and Tinkoff–Saxo started helping Etixx–Quick-Step at the front of the pack with 35 miles (56.3 kilometers) to go, as the gap to the three breakaway riders was down to two-and-a-half minutes. With 15 miles (24.1 kilometers) to race, Jelly Belly–Maxxis' Johnathan Freter crashed on the left side of the road, but was also able to return to the peloton. The break resisted to make it to the last intermediate sprint in West Sacramento, again won by Clarke. Tinkoff–Saxo marshaled the peloton after the breakaway was caught, then Kiel Reijnen (UnitedHealthcare) attempted to attack solo, but was caught shortly after. Etixx–Quick-Step took to the front of the field with 2 miles (3.2 kilometers) to cover, with Renshaw leading out Mark Cavendish for his tenth victory of the season, ahead of Peter Sagan and Jempy Drucker; no overall classification contenders lost time on the fast run-in.

Stage 1 result
Rank	Rider	Team	Time
1	Mark Cavendish (GBR)	Etixx–Quick-Step	4h 43' 27"
2	Peter Sagan (SVK)	Tinkoff–Saxo	+ 0"
3	Jempy Drucker (LUX)	BMC Racing Team	+ 0"
4	John Murphy (USA)	UnitedHealthcare	+ 0"
5	Guillaume Boivin (CAN)	Optum–Kelly Benefit Strategies	+ 0"
6	Zico Waeytens (BEL)	Team Giant–Alpecin	+ 0"
7	Wouter Wippert (NED)	Drapac Professional Cycling	+ 0"
8	Tyler Farrar (USA)	MTN–Qhubeka	+ 0"
9	Koen de Kort (NED)	Team Giant–Alpecin	+ 0"
10	Danny van Poppel (NED)	Trek Factory Racing	+ 0"

General classification after stage 1
Rank	Rider	Team	Time
1	Mark Cavendish (GBR)	Etixx–Quick-Step	4h 43' 17"
2	Will Clarke (AUS)	Drapac Professional Cycling	+ 1"
3	Peter Sagan (SVK)	Tinkoff–Saxo	+ 4"
4	Jempy Drucker (LUX)	BMC Racing Team	+ 6"
5	Rob Britton (CAN)	Team SmartStop	+ 6"
6	John Murphy (USA)	UnitedHealthcare	+ 10"
7	Guillaume Boivin (CAN)	Optum–Kelly Benefit Strategies	+ 10"
8	Zico Waeytens (BEL)	Team Giant–Alpecin	+ 10"
9	Wouter Wippert (NED)	Drapac Professional Cycling	+ 10"
10	Tyler Farrar (USA)	MTN–Qhubeka	+ 10"

=== Stage 2 ===
May 11, 2015 — Nevada City to Lodi, 120.4 mi (193.8 km)

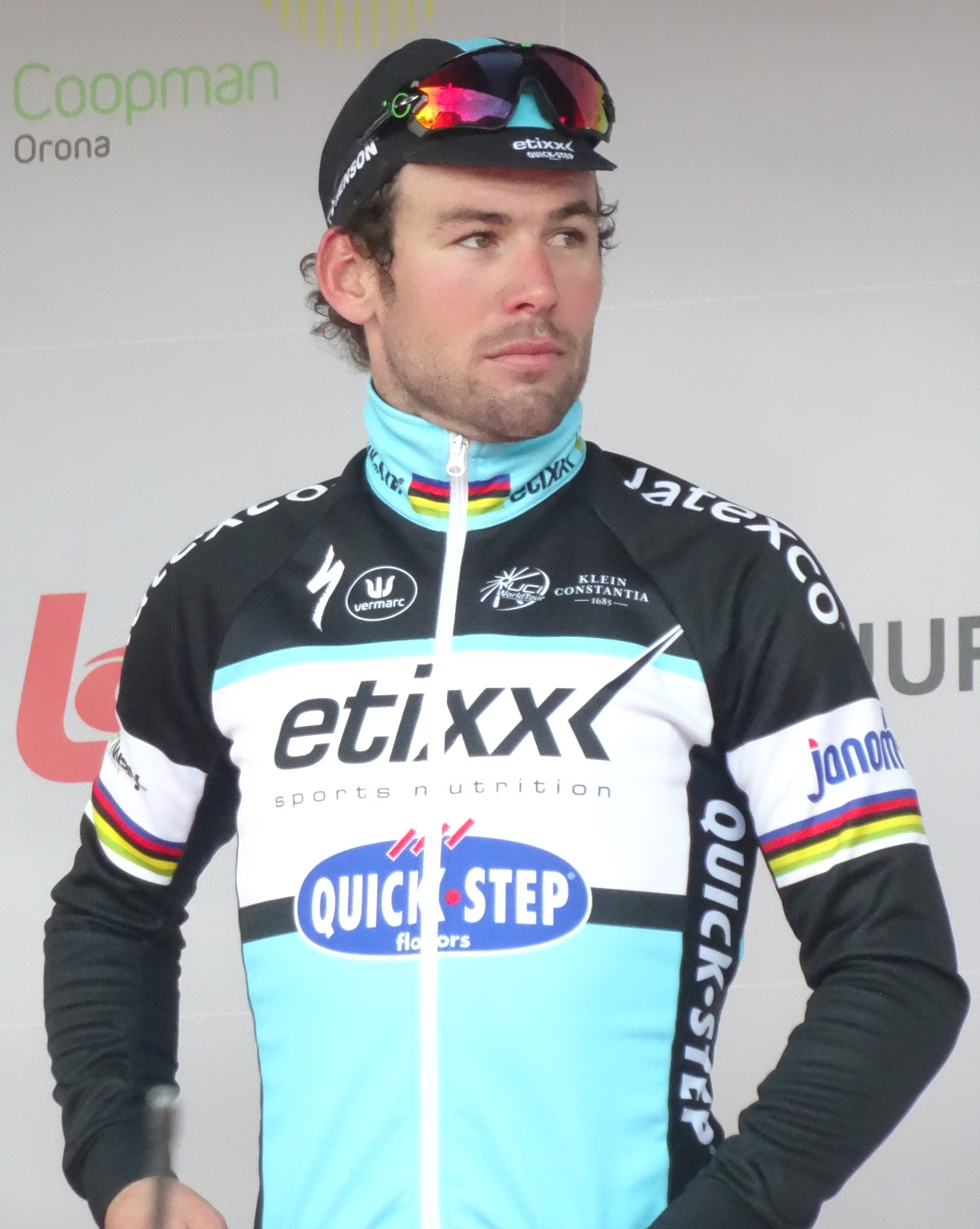
Mark Cavendish (pictured at Kuurne–Brussels–Kuurne) won his second consecutive stage in Lodi, to extend his general classification lead.

The second stage of the race again contained three intermediate sprints which were included in the first half of the parcours. There was also one categorized climb which summited after 40 miles (64.4 kilometers) of racing, a category 4 climb situated on State Route 49 to determine the first leader of the mountains classification. There was a finishing circuit in Lodi, which the riders completed twice. The elevation gain of the whole stage was 6,000 feet (1,800 meters).

A flurry of attacks occurred from kilometer zero, and after numerous failed attempts, Daniel Oss (BMC Racing Team) and Markel Irizar (Trek Factory Racing) succeeded in getting from the peloton. They were soon joined by Luis Amarán of Jamis–Hagens Berman and Robin Carpenter of Hincapie Racing Team, and after 17 miles (27.4 kilometers) of racing, the four escapees held a three-minute advantage. Carpenter took the first sprint points in Meadow Vista, and also led over the categorized climb, to take the polka-dot jersey for the third stage. 3 miles (4.8 kilometers) later, an intermediate sprint was contested in Cool, and was also won by Carpenter, who completed a sweep of the sprints in El Dorado. The breakaway enjoyed a maximum advantage of just over five minutes in the flat, open terrain, with Etixx–Quick-Step controlling the pace for race leader Mark Cavendish.

With 15 miles (24.1 kilometers) to go, the breakaway quartet held a 2' 40" lead over the peloton, but this gap decreased on the run-in to Lodi. A crash occurred before a bend with 5 miles (8.0 kilometers) to go implicating Ben Jacques-Maynes (Jamis–Hagens Berman) and one of the race favorites Warren Barguil of Team Giant–Alpecin; Jacques-Maynes did not finish the stage. The breakaway was absorbed shortly afterwards and no one tried to escape the bunch from that point on. In a very fast finish, Wouter Wippert (Drapac Professional Cycling) launched a long sprint and Sagan jumped onto his wheel. Cavendish opened his own sprint on the right side of the road and Sagan popped out of Wippert's wheel on the left, with Cavendish prevailing to take his second stage in a row, with Wippert rounding-up the podium.

Stage 2 result
Rank	Rider	Team	Time
1	Mark Cavendish (GBR)	Etixx–Quick-Step	4h 47' 02"
2	Peter Sagan (SVK)	Tinkoff–Saxo	+ 0"
3	Wouter Wippert (NED)	Drapac Professional Cycling	+ 0"
4	John Murphy (USA)	UnitedHealthcare	+ 0"
5	Danny van Poppel (NED)	Trek Factory Racing	+ 0"
6	Jempy Drucker (LUX)	BMC Racing Team	+ 0"
7	Lucas Sebastián Haedo (ARG)	Jamis–Hagens Berman	+ 0"
8	Tyler Farrar (USA)	MTN–Qhubeka	+ 0"
9	Jure Kocjan (SLO)	Team SmartStop	+ 0"
10	Zico Waeytens (BEL)	Team Giant–Alpecin	+ 0"

General classification after stage 2
Rank	Rider	Team	Time
1	Mark Cavendish (GBR)	Etixx–Quick-Step	9h 30' 09"
2	Peter Sagan (SVK)	Tinkoff–Saxo	+ 8"
3	Robin Carpenter (USA)	Hincapie Racing Team	+ 11"
4	Will Clarke (AUS)	Drapac Professional Cycling	+ 11"
5	Markel Irizar (SPA)	Trek Factory Racing	+ 14"
6	Jempy Drucker (LUX)	BMC Racing Team	+ 16"
7	Wouter Wippert (NED)	Drapac Professional Cycling	+ 16"
8	Rob Britton (CAN)	Team SmartStop	+ 16"
9	John Murphy (USA)	UnitedHealthcare	+ 20"
10	Danny van Poppel (NED)	Trek Factory Racing	+ 20"

=== Stage 3 ===
May 12, 2015 — San Jose to San Jose, 105.7 mi (170.1 km)

The third stage of the race featured only one intermediate sprint, contested in Livermore, then the climbing began. There were six King of the Mountains prizes (four were category 4 and one was category 2), with the major one being the climb to Mount Hamilton, an "hors-category" climb of 6.5 miles (10.5 kilometers) at an average 7% gradient. One of the category 4 climbs was situated at the end of the stage in San Jose, where the finale featured 250 meters (820 feet) at an average gradient of 10%. The elevation gain for the stage was 10,200 feet (3,100 meters).

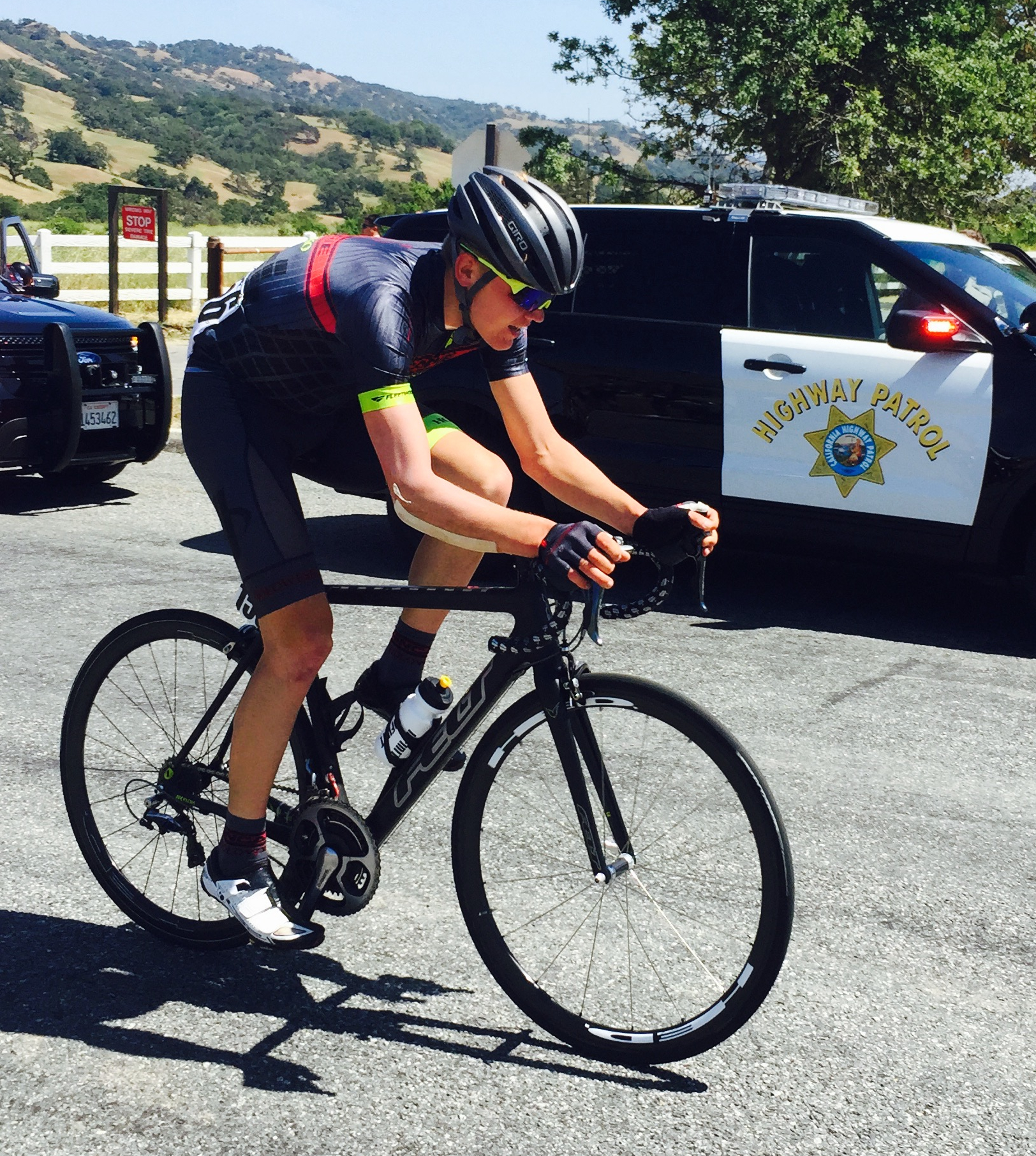
Toms Skujiņš (Hincapie Racing Team) won the stage, following a 34-mile (55-kilometer) solo attack, which gave him the lead in the general classification.

As the riders rolled out of the neutral zone, the temperatures were around 60 °F (15.6 °C) and sunny. Two riders did not take the start of the stage: Warren Barguil of Team Giant–Alpecin and Tyler Magner of Hincapie Racing Team, both due to a crash that occurred on the second stage. The start of the stage was very fast since a lot of riders wanted a chance to get the mountain points on offer during the stage. After 15 miles (24.1 kilometers) of racing and numerous attempts at forming a breakaway, riders were being dropped due to the rapid pace. Travis Meyer (Drapac Professional Cycling) was first through the intermediate sprint as the composition of the leading group was still changing by the minute. Soon, Roy Curvers (Team Giant–Alpecin), Daniel Oss (BMC Racing Team), Jonathan Clarke (UnitedHealthcare), Evan Huffman (Team SmartStop), Oscar Clark and Toms Skujiņš (both of Hincapie Racing Team) joined Meyer and formed the break.

Oss swept the three fourth-category climbs prior to Mount Hamilton, as the gap to the escapees was hovering around three-and-a-quarter minutes. At the foot of the climb, Skujiņš accelerated away from his companions and took maximum points, while behind him, the peloton split into several groups as they tackled the climb. Following the descent, Peter Sagan suffered a mechanical incident, but was able to rejoin the peloton. Skujiņš won the second-category climb at Quimby, but crashed on the descent as he made contact with a protective hay stack. After remounting, Skujiņš held a lead of two-and-a-half minutes over Oss with 12 miles (19.3 kilometers) to cover, with a further minute-and-a-half to the next main group. Skujiņš remained clear to the end of the stage, completing a 34-mile (55-kilometer) solo victory to take the lead of both the general and mountains classifications. Sagan, Julian Alaphilippe and Daniel Jaramillo were 1' 06" back, with a further 20 riders coming across the line 3 seconds later.

Stage 3 result
Rank	Rider	Team	Time
1	Toms Skujiņš (LAT)	Hincapie Racing Team	4h 33' 10"
2	Peter Sagan (SVK)	Tinkoff–Saxo	+ 1' 06"
3	Julian Alaphilippe (FRA)	Etixx–Quick-Step	+ 1' 06"
4	Daniel Jaramillo (COL)	Jamis–Hagens Berman	+ 1' 06"
5	Danilo Wyss (SWI)	BMC Racing Team	+ 1' 09"
6	Robert Gesink (NED)	LottoNL–Jumbo	+ 1' 09"
7	Sergio Henao (COL)	Team Sky	+ 1' 09"
8	Michael Woods (CAN)	Optum–Kelly Benefit Strategies	+ 1' 09"
9	Lawson Craddock (USA)	Team Giant–Alpecin	+ 1' 09"
10	Joe Dombrowski (USA)	Cannondale–Garmin	+ 1' 09"

General classification after stage 3
Rank	Rider	Team	Time
1	Toms Skujiņš (LAT)	Hincapie Racing Team	14h 04' 01"
2	Peter Sagan (SVK)	Tinkoff–Saxo	+ 32"
3	Rob Britton (CAN)	Team SmartStop	+ 43"
4	Julian Alaphilippe (FRA)	Etixx–Quick-Step	+ 44"
5	Daniel Jaramillo (COL)	Jamis–Hagens Berman	+ 44"
6	Dion Smith (NZL)	Hincapie Racing Team	+ 47"
7	Robert Gesink (NED)	LottoNL–Jumbo	+ 47"
8	Ben Hermans (BEL)	BMC Racing Team	+ 47"
9	Lawson Craddock (USA)	Team Giant–Alpecin	+ 47"
10	Jay McCarthy (AUS)	Tinkoff–Saxo	+ 47"

=== Stage 4 ===
May 13, 2015 — Pismo Beach to Avila Beach, 106.9 mi (172.0 km)

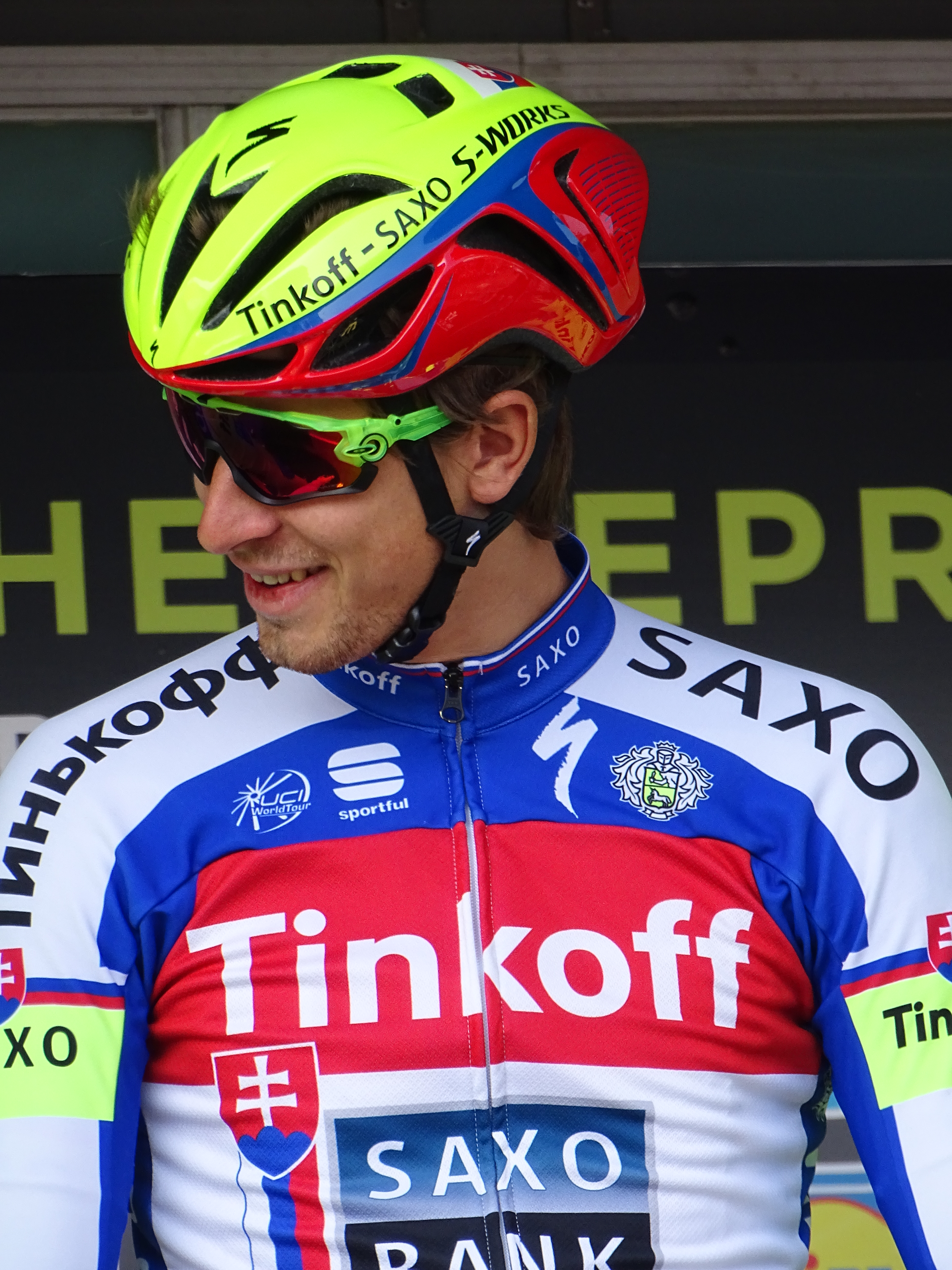
Peter Sagan (pictured at the Scheldeprijs) took his second win of the season, ahead of Wouter Wippert and sprints classification leader Mark Cavendish.

The fourth stage featured three intermediate sprints once again, contested in Guadalupe, Orcutt and Arroyo Grande respectively. Between the final two sprints, the peloton had to ascend a 4.7-mile (7.6-kilometer) third-category climb on Tepusquet Road. The altitude gained in the parcours was 5,200 feet (1,600 meters).

Despite the stiff crosswinds, the peloton rode at speeds approaching 30 mph (48 km/h) early on. The first sprint was won by Gregory Daniel (Axeon Cycling Team) while the race was still in "breakaway formation mode". Daniel was one of five riders that would eventually be part of the day's breakaway, along with Jesse Anthony (Optum–Kelly Benefit Strategies), Kiel Reijnen (UnitedHealthcare), Daniel Teklehaimanot (MTN–Qhubeka) and Will Clarke (Drapac Professional Cycling) – who had featured in the break on stage one. Daniel was the highest-placed rider in the breakaway, trailing race leader Toms Skujiņš of Hincapie Racing Team by exactly eight minutes; he also took the honors in the second intermediate sprint at Orcutt. On the run-in to the climb of Tepusquet Road, the peloton was being marshaled by Hincapie Racing Team and Etixx–Quick-Step as the gap hovered at three-and-a-half minutes. The 4.7-mile (7.6-kilometer) ascent of Tepusquet Road averaged 5% until the final kilometer, which was steeper at nearly 7%. The gap to the leaders reduced on the climb, with Anthony taking maximum points at the front.

After descending from the climb, the riders had to deal with a change of wind direction on the flatter roads, and LottoNL–Jumbo unsuccessfully tried to create echelons. As the riders reached the last intermediate sprint in Arroyo Grande – again won by Daniel – with 20 miles (32.2 kilometers) to go, the break held a 35-second lead. The escapees started a flurry of attacks, with Daniel the last to be caught with 10 miles (16.1 kilometers) to cover. With 5 miles (8.0 kilometers) left, the peloton was spread across the road, trying to sort out their lead-out trains ahead of a technical finish, with three 90-degree corners in the last kilometer and a short, steep rise right before the line. Daniel Oss (BMC Racing Team) tried his luck under the red kite, but was joined with about 100 meters (330 feet) remaining as Sagan powered his way past him to claim his second victory of the season, followed by Wouter Wippert (Drapac Professional Cycling) and Mark Cavendish. With a 10-second bonus for his victory, Sagan reduced Skujiņš' overall classification lead to 22 seconds.

Stage 4 result
Rank	Rider	Team	Time
1	Peter Sagan (SVK)	Tinkoff–Saxo	4h 06' 56"
2	Wouter Wippert (NED)	Drapac Professional Cycling	+ 0"
3	Mark Cavendish (GBR)	Etixx–Quick-Step	+ 0"
4	Lucas Sebastián Haedo (ARG)	Jamis–Hagens Berman	+ 0"
5	Tyler Farrar (USA)	MTN–Qhubeka	+ 0"
6	Jasper Stuyven (BEL)	Trek Factory Racing	+ 0"
7	Jempy Drucker (LUX)	BMC Racing Team	+ 0"
8	Daniel Oss (ITA)	BMC Racing Team	+ 0"
9	Jure Kocjan (SLO)	Team SmartStop	+ 0"
10	John Murphy (USA)	UnitedHealthcare	+ 0"

General classification after stage 4
Rank	Rider	Team	Time
1	Toms Skujiņš (LAT)	Hincapie Racing Team	18h 10' 57"
2	Peter Sagan (SVK)	Tinkoff–Saxo	+ 22"
3	Rob Britton (CAN)	Team SmartStop	+ 43"
4	Julian Alaphilippe (FRA)	Etixx–Quick-Step	+ 44"
5	Daniel Jaramillo (COL)	Jamis–Hagens Berman	+ 44"
6	Robert Gesink (NED)	LottoNL–Jumbo	+ 47"
7	Ben Hermans (BEL)	BMC Racing Team	+ 47"
8	Dion Smith (NZL)	Hincapie Racing Team	+ 47"
9	Lawson Craddock (USA)	Team Giant–Alpecin	+ 47"
10	Jay McCarthy (AUS)	Tinkoff–Saxo	+ 47"

=== Stage 5 ===
May 14, 2015 — Santa Barbara to Santa Clarita, 95.7 mi (154.0 km)

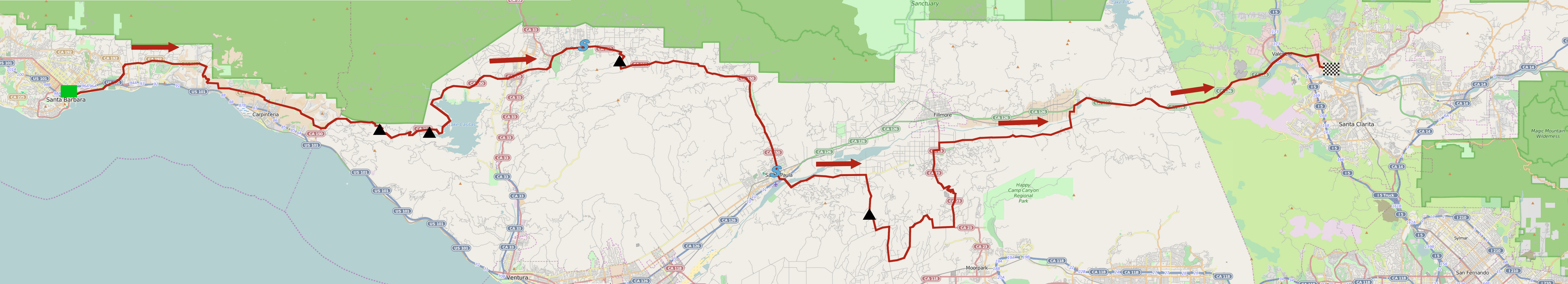
The route of the fifth stage

The stage had two intermediate sprint contests held in Ojai and Santa Paula. Four categorized climbs were on the itinerary, two of them (both fourth-category) being situated on State Route 150, along with the third-category Dennison Grade and the fourth-category Balcom Canyon. The last 25 miles (40.2 kilometers) of the stage to Santa Clarita was mainly flat, with the listed official elevation gain for the stage given as 7,600 feet (2,300 meters).

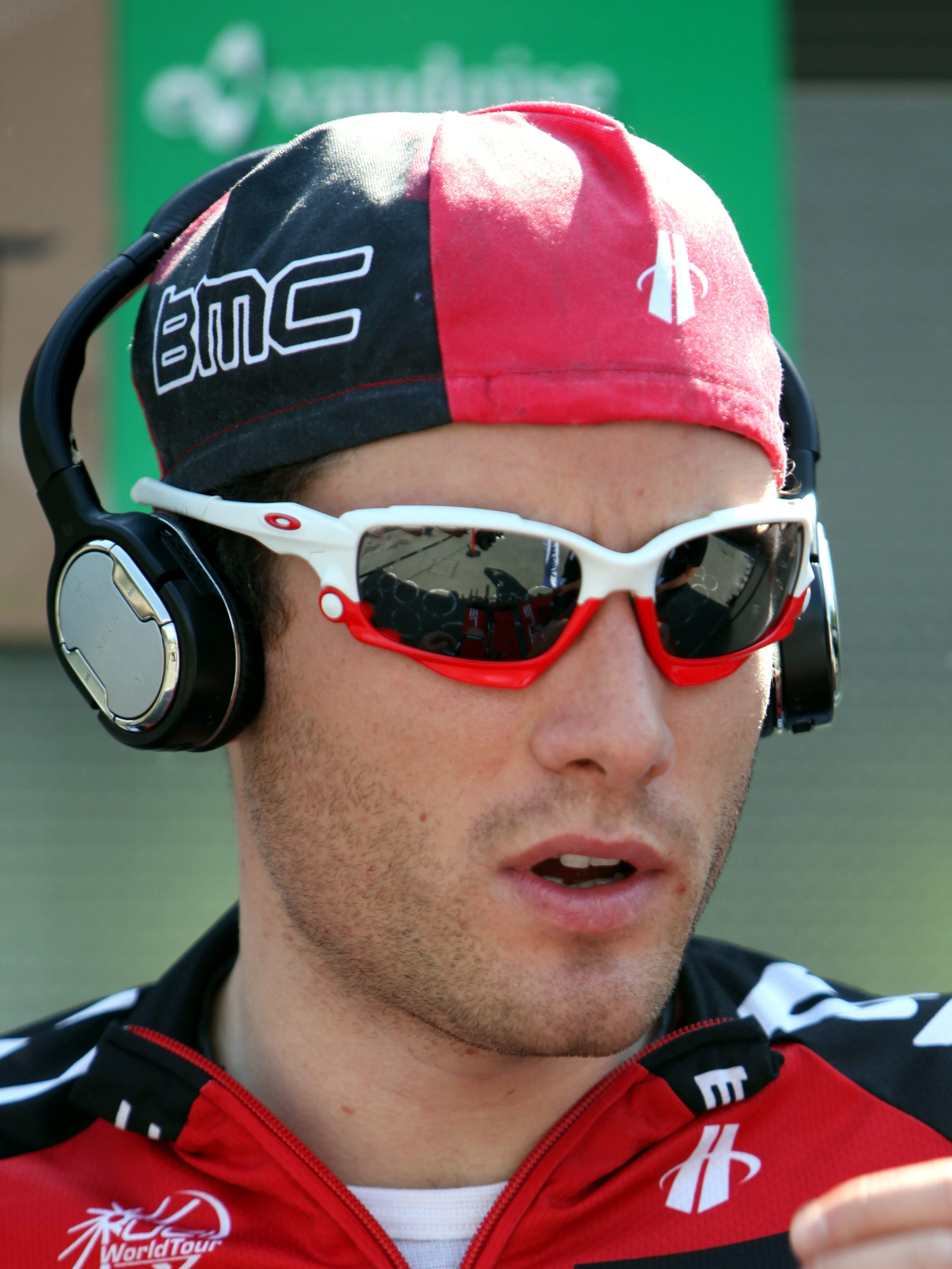
Danilo Wyss (pictured at the 2011 Tour de Romandie) was the last of the breakaway riders to be caught, 2 miles (3.2 kilometers) from the finish.

From the start, Daniel Oss (BMC Racing Team) tried to get clear from the peloton since he was in second place in the Mountains competition, one point behind Toms Skujiņš (Hincapie Racing Team), who led this classification as well as the general classification. Oss was unsuccessful in his attempt, but his teammate Danilo Wyss also tried to get clear, despite being only 47 seconds down on the general classification. This move sparked some chasing by the peloton, but after around 10 miles (16.1 kilometers) of racing, the gap had extended to one-and-a-half minutes. Wyss was joined the breakway by Alex Howes (Cannondale–Garmin), Javier Mejías (Team Novo Nordisk), Lachlan Morton (Jelly Belly–Maxxis) and Geoffrey Curran of Axeon Cycling Team. The responsibility for the chase fell upon Hincapie Racing Team's riders, whose task it was to manage the gap. The break soon hit the first two short, steep categorized climbs near Lake Casitas, with Wyss leading the quintet over on both occasions.

After the descent of the latter climb, there was about 10 miles (16.1 kilometers) of flat roads to the first intermediate sprint in Ojai, which was won by Howes. Immediately after that, the riders ascended the Dennison Grade climb, won by Morton. With 60 miles (96.6 kilometers) to go, rain started falling and some riders opted to put rain jackets on as the temperatures dipped to 56 °F (13.3 °C). The leaders passed Santa Paula where Wyss won the last intermediate sprint of the day. The very steep climb of Balcom Canyon was won by Morton, while behind Chris Butler of Team SmartStop attacked from the main field and tried to bridge to the escapees. After chasing for 8 miles (12.9 kilometers), Butler was able to bridge the gap to make the lead group a sextet. With the rain making the roads slippery, the lead group split in two with only Howes, Curran and Wyss remaining clear with a gap of 1' 50" with 25 miles (40.2 kilometers) to race.

Hincapie Racing Team and Etixx–Quick-Step marshaled the peloton, but they were unable to make ground in the rain, with the leaders continuing to lead by 1' 50" with 14 miles (22.5 kilometers) to the finish. Danny Pate of Team Sky and some Drapac Professional Cycling riders came to the fore to help out with the chase, but Wyss attacked the break after a crash occurred in the field. He was finally caught with 2 miles (3.2 kilometers) remaining. A bunch sprint ensued on drier roads in Santa Clarita, with Mark Cavendish taking his third stage victory, beating Zico Waeytens (Team Giant–Alpecin) by a bike length. With third place, Peter Sagan reduced Skujiņš' overall lead for a second consecutive day, with the lead standing at 18 seconds.

Stage 5 result
Rank	Rider	Team	Time
1	Mark Cavendish (GBR)	Etixx–Quick-Step	3h 51' 37"
2	Zico Waeytens (BEL)	Team Giant–Alpecin	+ 0"
3	Peter Sagan (SVK)	Tinkoff–Saxo	+ 0"
4	Jempy Drucker (LUX)	BMC Racing Team	+ 0"
5	Danny van Poppel (NED)	Trek Factory Racing	+ 0"
6	Guillaume Boivin (CAN)	Optum–Kelly Benefit Strategies	+ 0"
7	John Murphy (USA)	UnitedHealthcare	+ 0"
8	Matthew Goss (AUS)	MTN–Qhubeka	+ 0"
9	Mike Teunissen (NED)	LottoNL–Jumbo	+ 0"
10	Justin Oien (USA)	Axeon Cycling Team	+ 0"

General classification after stage 5
Rank	Rider	Team	Time
1	Toms Skujiņš (LAT)	Hincapie Racing Team	22h 02' 34"
2	Peter Sagan (SVK)	Tinkoff–Saxo	+ 18"
3	Julian Alaphilippe (FRA)	Etixx–Quick-Step	+ 44"
4	Robert Gesink (NED)	LottoNL–Jumbo	+ 47"
5	Dion Smith (NZL)	Hincapie Racing Team	+ 47"
6	Ben Hermans (BEL)	BMC Racing Team	+ 47"
7	Lawson Craddock (USA)	Team Giant–Alpecin	+ 47"
8	Jay McCarthy (AUS)	Tinkoff–Saxo	+ 47"
9	Peter Kennaugh (GBR)	Team Sky	+ 47"
10	Janez Brajkovič (SLO)	UnitedHealthcare	+ 47"

=== Stage 6 ===
May 15, 2015 — Santa Clarita to Santa Clarita, 6.6 mi (10.6 km), individual time trial (ITT)

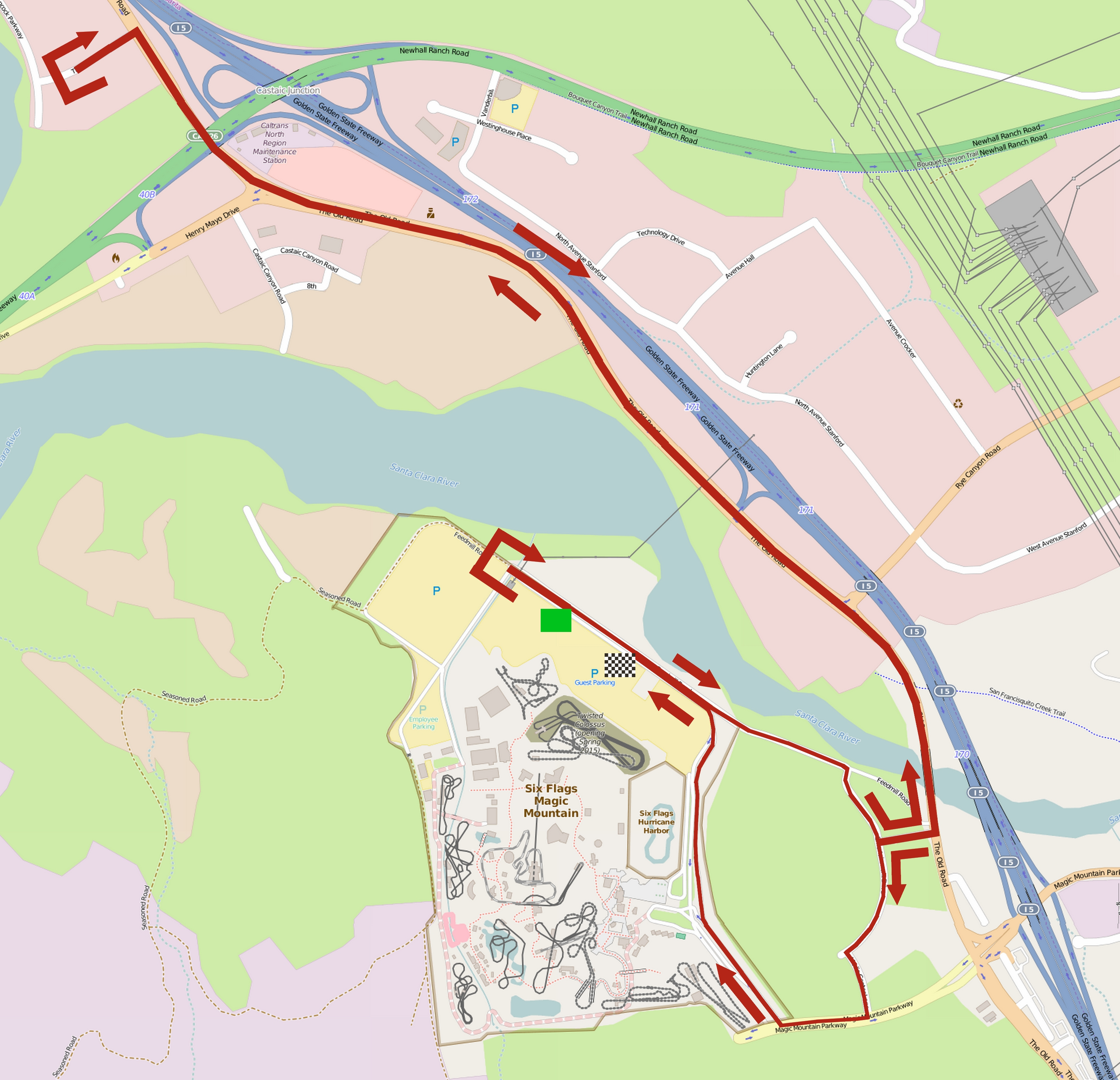
The revised itinerary of the sixth stage, a 6.6-mile (10.6-kilometer) course starting and finishing at the Six Flags Magic Mountain theme park in Santa Clarita.

Big Bear Lake, situated at an altitude of 6,000 feet (1,828.8 meters), was supposed to welcome the event but was forecast to receive 2–5 inches (51–127 millimeters) of snow. As a result, race organizers opted to move the event 100 miles (160 kilometers) east to Santa Clarita, with the Six Flags Magic Mountain theme park serving as both the start and finish location of the stage. The course was mainly flat and did not feature many corners, but there was a 180 degree turnaround. Race director Jim Birrell stated that "the result is really anyone's guess" ahead of the stage.

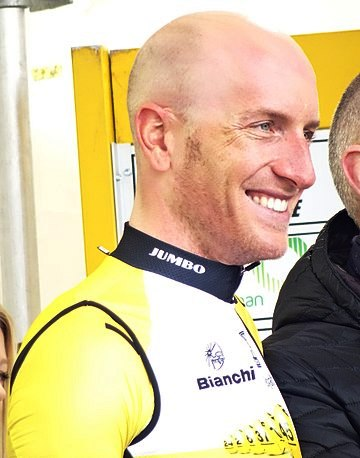
Jos van Emden (pictured at Kuurne–Brussels–Kuurne) spent almost two hours with the best time, before being usurped by Peter Sagan

As was customary of time trial stages, cyclists set off in reverse order from where they were ranked in the general classification at the end of the previous stage. Therefore, Carson Miller of Jamis–Hagens Berman, who, in 133rd place trailed overall leader Toms Skujiņš (Hincapie Racing Team) by forty-two minutes and eighteen seconds, was the first rider to set off on the final stage. Riders went on the course at one-minute intervals until the last twenty competitors, who left at two-minute intervals. There was a tailwind coming out of the start gates and a headwind coming back with temperatures hovering around 62 °F (16.7 °C).

45 minutes into the event, the erstwhile stage leader was Jos van Emden (LottoNL–Jumbo) with a time of 12' 46". An hour into the stage and with 36 riders having completed the course, van Emden still led the timesheets. Many of the cyclists in the early wave were out on the course on their usual road machine, with no aero bars to gain an aerodynamic advantage. Mark Cavendish – standing 62nd in the general classification – overtook the rider in front of him, sprinter Zico Waeytens (Team Giant–Alpecin), as he finished thirty seconds down on van Emden's time. Daniele Bennati (Tinkoff–Saxo) then set the second-fastest time, seven seconds down on van Emden.

Shortly afterwards, Daniel Oss (BMC Racing Team), wearing the polka dot jersey as he was second to Skujiņš in the mountains classification, set a time of 12' 59", which was the fourth-best time to that point. Overall classification favorite Sergio Henao (Team Sky) completed the course in a time of 12' 57", with LottoNL–Jumbo's Robert Gesink a second slower. Van Emden had to wait until the penultimate rider Peter Sagan got on the course for his time to be beaten. Sagan negotiated the corners aggressively and registered a time of 12' 32", besting van Emden by fourteen seconds. With Skujiņš finishing 46 seconds behind in 34th position, Sagan moved into the race lead by 28 seconds.

Stage 6 result
Rank	Rider	Team	Time
1	Peter Sagan (SVK)	Tinkoff–Saxo	12' 31"
2	Jos van Emden (NED)	LottoNL–Jumbo	+ 15"
3	Julian Alaphilippe (FRA)	Etixx–Quick-Step	+ 19"
4	Joey Rosskopf (USA)	BMC Racing Team	+ 20"
5	Daniele Bennati (ITA)	Tinkoff–Saxo	+ 22"
6	Tom Zirbel (USA)	Optum–Kelly Benefit Strategies	+ 26"
7	Sergio Henao (COL)	Team Sky	+ 26"
8	Jay McCarthy (AUS)	Tinkoff–Saxo	+ 27"
9	Robert Gesink (NED)	LottoNL–Jumbo	+ 27"
10	Daniel Oss (ITA)	BMC Racing Team	+ 28"

General classification after stage 6
Rank	Rider	Team	Time
1	Peter Sagan (SVK)	Tinkoff–Saxo	22h 15' 23"
2	Toms Skujiņš (LAT)	Hincapie Racing Team	+ 28"
3	Julian Alaphilippe (FRA)	Etixx–Quick-Step	+ 45"
4	Joey Rosskopf (USA)	BMC Racing Team	+ 49"
5	Sergio Henao (COL)	Team Sky	+ 55"
6	Jay McCarthy (AUS)	Tinkoff–Saxo	+ 56"
7	Robert Gesink (NED)	LottoNL–Jumbo	+ 56"
8	Ben King (USA)	Cannondale–Garmin	+ 58"
9	Dion Smith (NZL)	Hincapie Racing Team	+ 1' 03"
10	Haimar Zubeldia (ESP)	Trek Factory Racing	+ 1' 04"

=== Stage 7 ===
May 16, 2015 — Ontario to Mount Baldy, 80 mi (128.7 km)

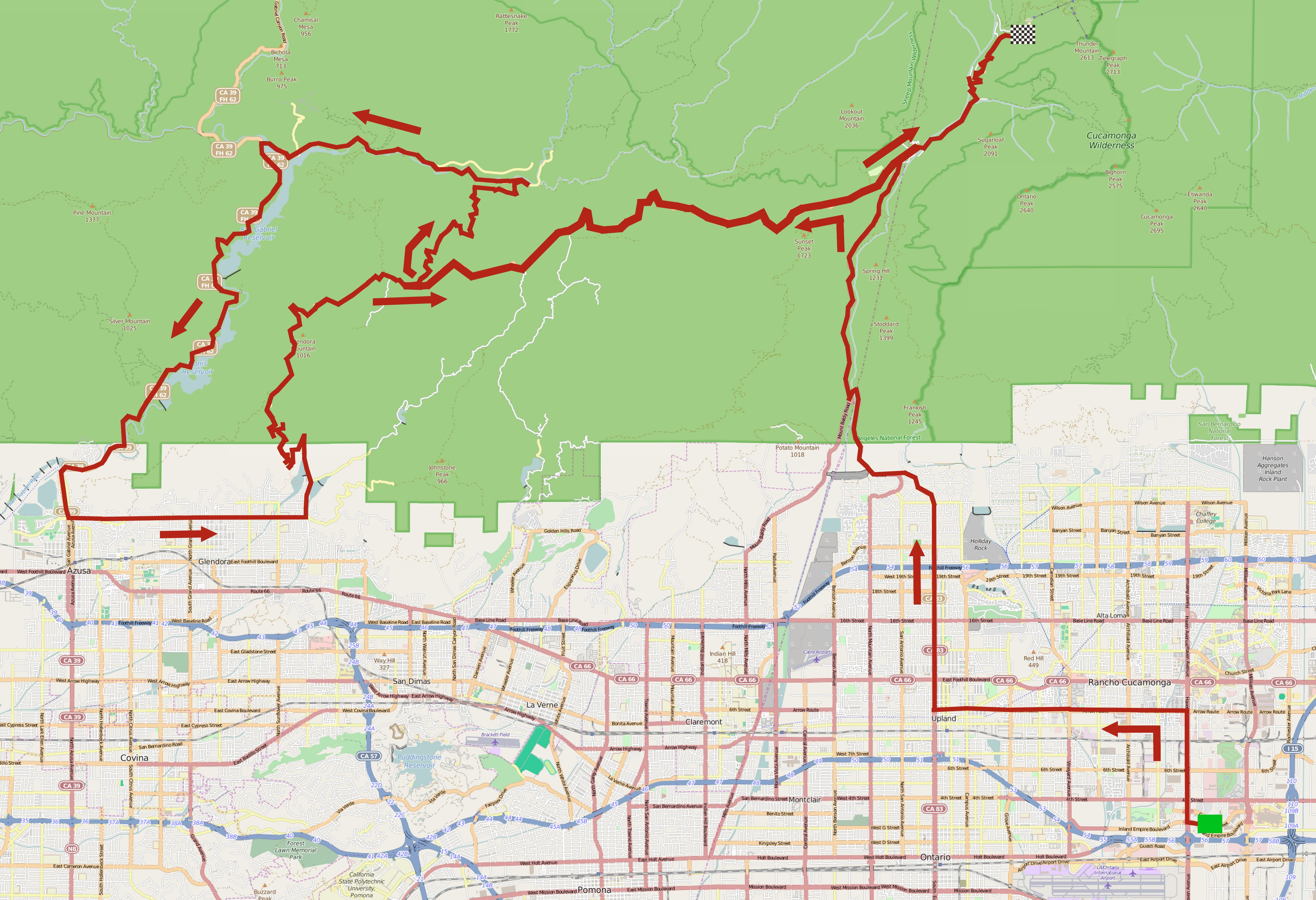
The route of the seventh stage

The queen stage of the 2015 Tour of California, the riders contended with the first King of the Mountains climb, the second-category ascent of Glendora Ridge Road. After descending into Glendora for an intermediate sprint, the climbing resumed with another second-category climb, the Glendora Mountain Road, before an hors-category climb to the stage finish at Mount Baldy Ski Lifts. This ascent, with 15 hairpins, took the competitors from an altitude of about 1,000 feet (300 meters) to approximately 6,800 feet (2,100 meters), and reached a maximum gradient of 17%. The stage had the biggest elevation gain of the race, with 11,600 feet (3,500 meters) of climbing and featured hardly any flat terrain.

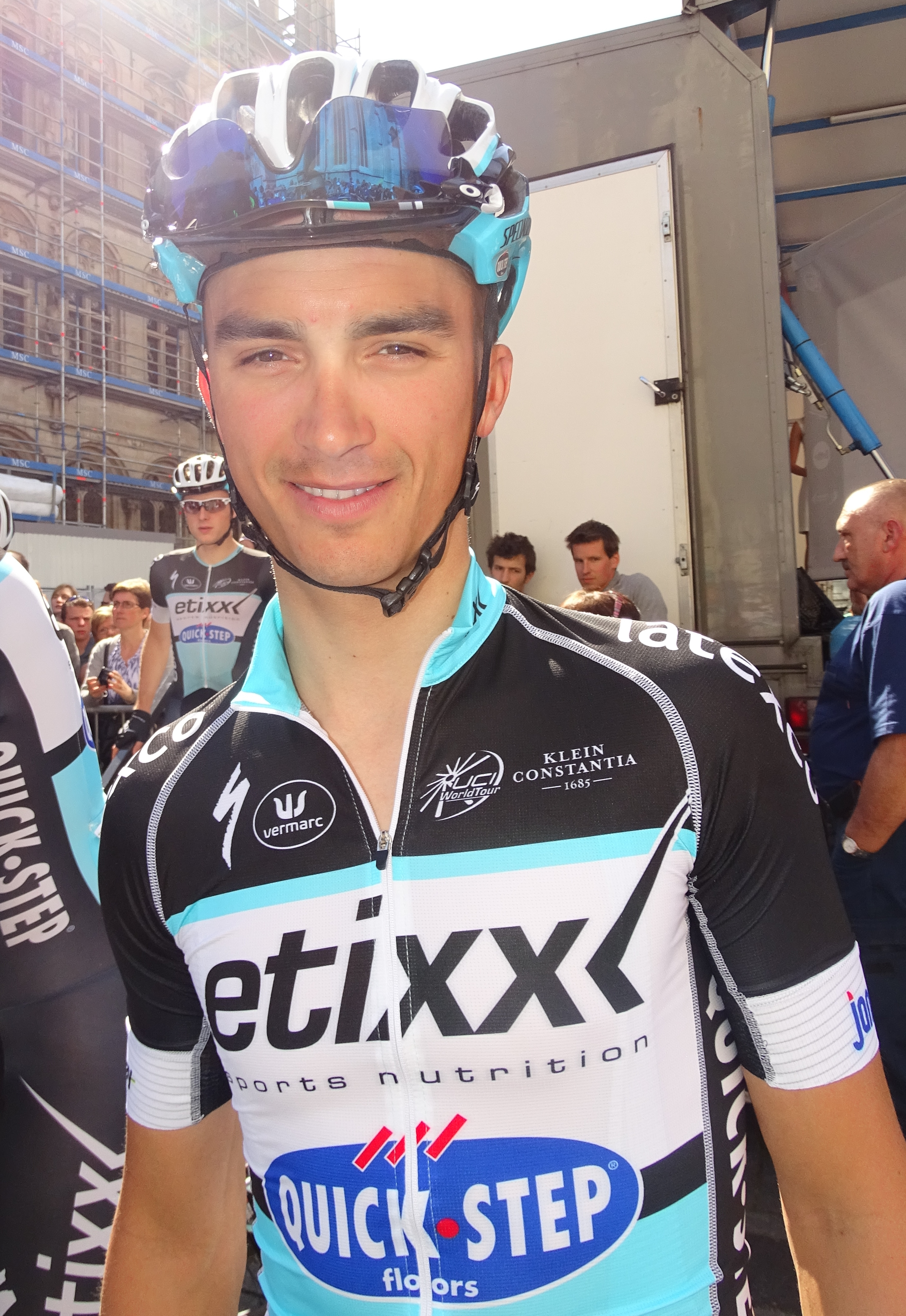
22-year-old Frenchman Julian Alaphilippe (pictured at Brabantse Pijl) won the queen stage of the race, and moved into the race lead by two seconds ahead of Peter Sagan, prior to the final stage.

As the race got underway, reports indicated that the temperatures at the finish line were as low as 42 °F (6 °C). The race start saw a flurry of attacks which were quickly brought back. On the climb to Glendora Ridge Road, a break tried to get clear including the first two riders in the mountains classification, Toms Skujiņš (Hincapie Racing Team) and Daniel Oss (BMC Racing Team), who were separated by one point. The other breakaway riders were Gregory Brenes (Jamis–Hagens Berman), Lasse Norman Hansen (Cannondale–Garmin), Chris Butler (Team SmartStop), Daniele Ratto (UnitedHealthcare) and Johann van Zyl of MTN–Qhubeka. Before the end of the climb, Skujiņš – who was second in the general classification – returned to the peloton; Lachlan Morton of Jelly Belly–Maxxis joined the break as Ratto and Norman Hansen were distanced. Oss took maximum points on the climb, with the peloton around two minutes behind at that point – of the breakaway riders, Oss was best placed in the general classification at 9' 29" behind race leader Peter Sagan.

The breakaway was splitting up on the twisting, narrow descent with Oss, Butler and Morton going clear for a period, but they were chased by the rest of the former breakaway group (with the exception of Butler), who made contact on the run-in to Glendora. Meanwhile, the peloton – led by Team Sky, Tinkoff–Saxo and LottoNL–Jumbo – containing the favorites and Sagan were almost four minutes in arrears. Norman Hansen led the breakaway group through the intermediate sprint, prior to a mostly uphill section for 25 miles (40.2 kilometers) until the finish line. Van Zyl attacked and Oss, now in the lead of the mountains classification, made contact with him. With 20 miles (32.2 kilometers) to race, the gap from the peloton to the front of the race was two minutes and Team Sky upped the pace in an effort to drop Sagan. After Oss won maximum points at the Glendora Mountain Road climb, he dropped back to the peloton, leaving van Zyl on his own out front.

Skujiņš was distanced with 15 miles (24.1 kilometers) remaining, ensuring that he was fall down the order from second overall. Once van Zyl was caught, all the favorites were still in the leading group along with Sagan, with 12 miles (19.3 kilometers) remaining. 2012 Mount Baldy stage winner Robert Gesink of LottoNL–Jumbo was dropped with 3.5 miles (5.6 kilometers) to cover, while young rider classification leader Julian Alaphilippe (Etixx–Quick-Step) took the lead of the very depleted group. Team Sky's Sergio Henao attacked, which caused Sagan to be dropped as he attempted to hold onto the race lead. Alaphilippe responded to Henao's attack, and ultimately dropped him on the snow-lined roads. He soloed through the twisting final kilometres featuring bad tarmac, and held on to take his first win of the season after numerous podium placings. Henao finished second, 23 seconds in arrears, alongside teammate Ian Boswell, while Sagan finished in sixth place some 47 seconds behind, meaning that Alaphilippe held a two-second lead in the general classification ahead of the final stage.

Stage 7 result
Rank	Rider	Team	Time
1	Julian Alaphilippe (FRA)	Etixx–Quick-Step	3h 42' 13"
2	Sergio Henao (COL)	Team Sky	+ 23"
3	Ian Boswell (USA)	Team Sky	+ 23"
4	Joe Dombrowski (USA)	Cannondale–Garmin	+ 36"
5	Riccardo Zoidl (AUT)	Trek Factory Racing	+ 45"
6	Peter Sagan (SVK)	Tinkoff–Saxo	+ 47"
7	Haimar Zubeldia (ESP)	Trek Factory Racing	+ 53"
8	Robert Gesink (NED)	LottoNL–Jumbo	+ 1' 00"
9	Peter Kennaugh (GBR)	Team Sky	+ 1' 17"
10	Laurens ten Dam (NED)	LottoNL–Jumbo	+ 1' 26"

General classification after stage 7
Rank	Rider	Team	Time
1	Julian Alaphilippe (FRA)	Etixx–Quick-Step	25h 58' 21"
2	Peter Sagan (SVK)	Tinkoff–Saxo	+ 2"
3	Sergio Henao (COL)	Team Sky	+ 33"
4	Joe Dombrowski (USA)	Cannondale–Garmin	+ 1' 10"
5	Robert Gesink (NED)	LottoNL–Jumbo	+ 1' 11"
6	Haimar Zubeldia (ESP)	Trek Factory Racing	+ 1' 12"
7	Ian Boswell (USA)	Team Sky	+ 1' 19"
8	Riccardo Zoidl (AUT)	Trek Factory Racing	+ 1' 20"
9	Peter Kennaugh (GBR)	Team Sky	+ 1' 40"
10	Rob Britton (CAN)	Team SmartStop	+ 2' 06"

=== Stage 8 ===
May 17, 2015 — L.A. Live to Pasadena, 59 mi (95.0 km)

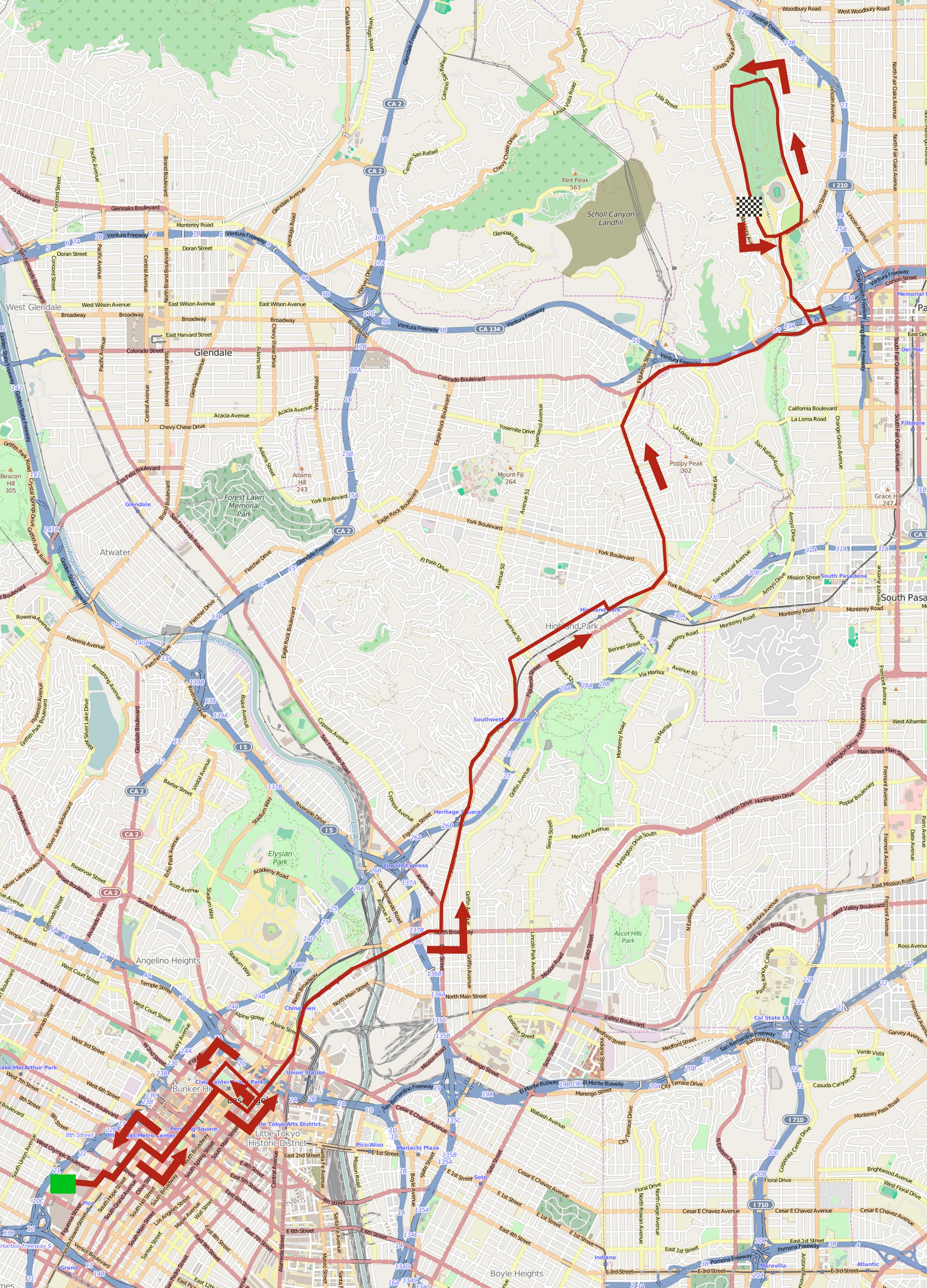
The route of the final stage.

The last stage of the race was also its shortest road stage at 59 miles (95.0 kilometers). There was one intermediate sprint point at the first crossing of the finish line near the Rose Bowl, before the riders completed nine laps of a circuit in Pasadena. The total elevation gain was 2,000 feet (610 meters), with no categorized climbs.

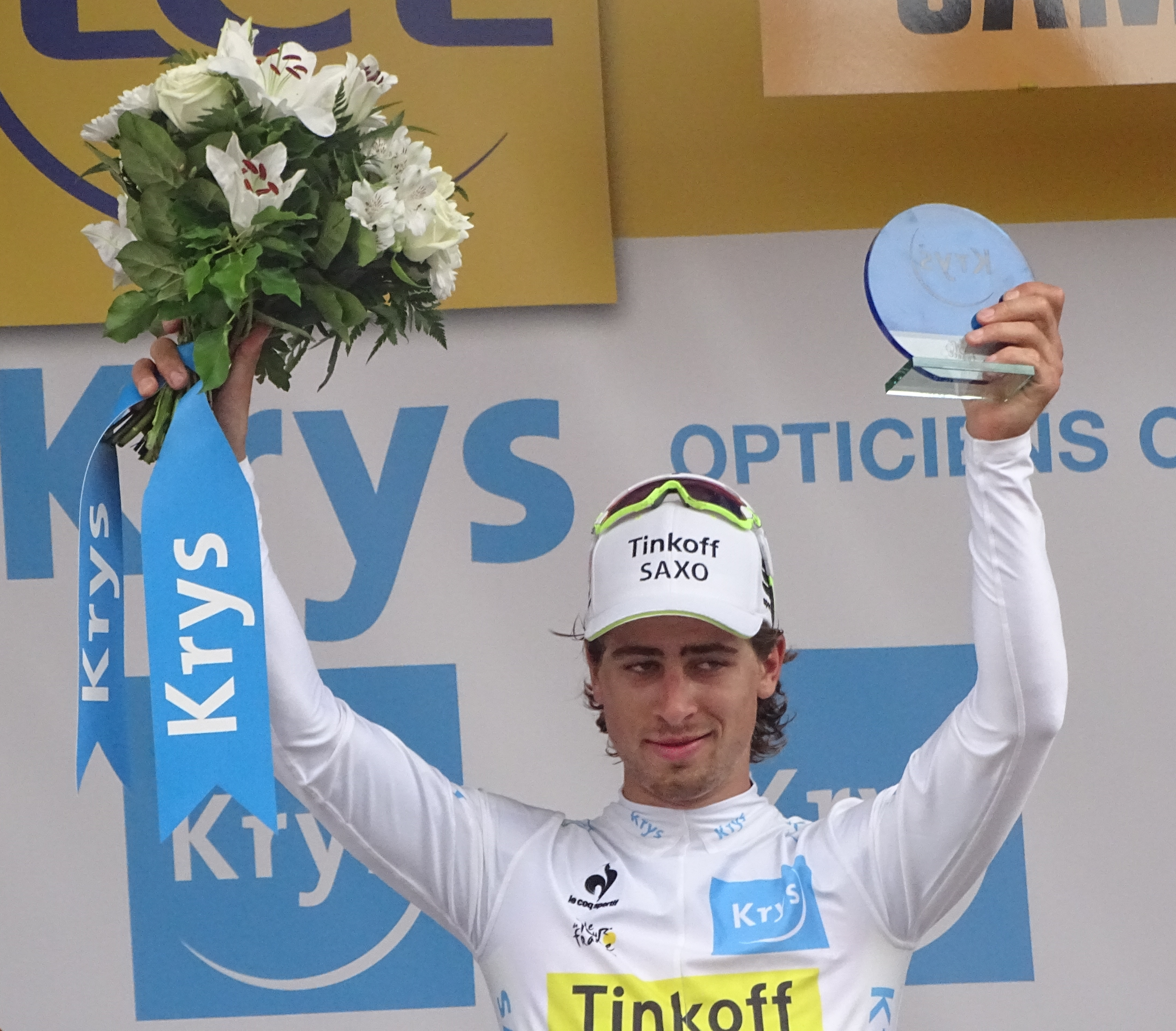
Peter Sagan (pictured later in the season at the Tour de France) won the general classification on the final stage, ahead of Julian Alaphilippe. His three-second winning margin was the smallest in the race's history.

This stage was supposed to have no consequences on the general classification due to its flat terrain, but the two-second difference separating Julian Alaphilippe and Peter Sagan meant that the Tour was not yet decided. A maximum of thirteen bonus seconds were on offer in the stage – the first three riders at both the intermediate sprint (3, 2 and 1 seconds) and the stage finish (10, 6 and 4 seconds) were able to gain time on the general classification.

The race got underway in sunny weather, with temperatures around 70 °F (21.1 °C). A breakaway was formed, consisting of two Etixx–Quick-Step riders, Matteo Trentin and Yves Lampaert, Danny Pate (Team Sky), Jacques Janse van Rensburg (MTN–Qhubeka) and Ruben Zepuntke (Cannondale–Garmin). Tinkoff–Saxo pulled at the front since they wanted to bring back the break so Sagan could have a chance to sprint for bonus seconds in the intermediate sprint. The team was down two riders since Maciej Bodnar and Michael Kolář had to abandon earlier in the race. Mark Cavendish stated that he would work for Alaphilippe and forget his own ambitions for a fourth stage victory.

10 miles (16.1 kilometers) prior to the intermediate sprint, the breakaway was reeled in. Subsequent attacks came from several Etixx–Quick-Step riders but on each occasion were reabsorbed to the peloton. At the intermediate sprint, Cavendish won ahead of Sagan and Alaphilippe, meaning that Alaphilippe held a virtual lead of one second. Immediately after the sprint, two Hincapie Racing Team riders went clear, Joseph Lewis and Oscar Clark. They were soon joined by BMC Racing Team's Manuel Senni and Jesse Anthony (Optum–Kelly Benefit Strategies).

I'm very happy to win the Tour of California, also because this year I lost the green jersey, so I had to do something here to get on the podium.

— Peter Sagan, following his overall race victory, Cyclingnews.com

The sprinters' teams came to the fore, and with 20 miles (32.2 kilometers) to go, the average speed of the race had been 28 mph (45.1 km/h). Cavendish ultimately did take his fourth stage win of the race, ahead of Wouter Wippert. Third place went to a photo finish between Sagan and Tyler Farrar, with Sagan's bike throw on the line giving him the decision, the four-second resultant time bonus and the overall race victory by three seconds – the closest race-winning margin in its history – over Alaphilippe.

Stage 8 result
Rank	Rider	Team	Time
1	Mark Cavendish (GBR)	Etixx–Quick-Step	2h 14' 55"
2	Wouter Wippert (NED)	Drapac Professional Cycling	+ 0"
3	Peter Sagan (SVK)	Tinkoff–Saxo	+ 0"
4	Tyler Farrar (USA)	MTN–Qhubeka	+ 0"
5	Tom Van Asbroeck (BEL)	LottoNL–Jumbo	+ 0"
6	Lucas Sebastián Haedo (ARG)	Jamis–Hagens Berman	+ 0"
7	Zico Waeytens (BEL)	Team Giant–Alpecin	+ 0"
8	Andrea Peron (ITA)	Team Novo Nordisk	+ 0"
9	Logan Owen (USA)	Axeon Cycling Team	+ 0"
10	Martijn Verschoor (NED)	Team Novo Nordisk	+ 0"

Final general classification
Rank	Rider	Team	Time
1	Peter Sagan (SVK)	Tinkoff–Saxo	28h 13' 12"
2	Julian Alaphilippe (FRA)	Etixx–Quick-Step	+ 3"
3	Sergio Henao (COL)	Team Sky	+ 37"
4	Joe Dombrowski (USA)	Cannondale–Garmin	+ 1' 14"
5	Robert Gesink (NED)	LottoNL–Jumbo	+ 1' 15"
6	Haimar Zubeldia (ESP)	Trek Factory Racing	+ 1' 16"
7	Ian Boswell (USA)	Team Sky	+ 1' 23"
8	Riccardo Zoidl (AUT)	Trek Factory Racing	+ 1' 24"
9	Peter Kennaugh (GBR)	Team Sky	+ 1' 44"
10	Rob Britton (CAN)	Team SmartStop	+ 2' 10"

== Classification leadership ==
In the 2015 Tour of California, five jerseys were awarded. For the general classification, calculated by adding the finishing times of the stages per cyclist, the leader received a yellow jersey sponsored by biopharmaceutical company Amgen, the title sponsor of the race as a whole. Time bonuses were awarded for the first three finishers on mass-start stages (10, 6 and 4 seconds respectively) and on intermediate sprints (3, 2 and 1 seconds respectively). This classification was considered the most important of the Tour of California, and the winner of the general classification was considered the winner of the Tour of California.

Additionally, there was also a sprints classification, akin to what is called the points classification in other races, which awarded a green and neon yellow jersey sponsored by nonprofit organization Visit California. In the sprints classification, cyclists received points for finishing in the top 15 in a stage. In addition, some points could be won in intermediate sprints as well as bonus seconds in the overall classification. The first across the line got 3 seconds, the second two and the third rider, one.

There was also a mountains classification, which awarded a white jersey with red polka dots, sponsored by automobile manufacturer Nissan. In the mountains classification, points were won by reaching the top of a mountain before other cyclists. Each climb was categorized, with more points available for the harder climbs. There was also a young rider classification, which was calculated the same way as the general classification, but only cyclists under the age of 23 were included. The leader of the young rider classification received a white and red jersey, sponsored by bicycle component manufacturer SRAM Corporation.

The last jersey was awarded to the most combative rider of a stage for him to wear on the next stage. It was generally awarded to a rider who attacked constantly or spent a lot of time in the breakaways. This jersey was white, blue and yellow, and was also sponsored by Amgen and their Breakaway from Cancer collaboration with four nonprofit organizations. There was also a classification for teams. In this classification, the times of the best three cyclists per stage were added, and the team with the lowest time was the leader.

Stage	Winner	General classification	Young rider classification	Mountains classification	Sprints classification	Most courageous rider	Teams classification
1	Mark Cavendish	Mark Cavendish	Zico Waeytens	not awarded (Note: On Stage 2, Peter Sagan wore the jersey, although no points were awarded on the first stage.)	Mark Cavendish (Note: On Stage 2, Will Clarke (second in the sprints classification) wore the green jersey as Mark Cavendish (first in the sprints classification) wore the yellow jersey of race leader. Peter Sagan (second in the sprints classification) wore the green jersey on Stage 3, as Cavendish maintained the race lead.)	Will Clarke (Note: Clarke did not wear this jersey on Stage 2, as he wore the green jersey instead of sprints classification leader Mark Cavendish. The jersey was worn by Robert Sweeting.)	BMC Racing Team
2	Mark Cavendish	Mark Cavendish	Robin Carpenter (Note: On Stage 3, Danny van Poppel (second in the young rider classification) wore the white jersey as Robin Carpenter (first in the young rider classification) wore the polka dot jersey of mountains classification leader.)	Robin Carpenter	Mark Cavendish	Markel Irizar	Tinkoff–Saxo
3	Toms Skujiņš	Toms Skujiņš	Julian Alaphilippe (Note: On Stage 8, Tao Geoghegan Hart (second in the young rider classification) wore the white jersey as Julian Alaphilippe (first in the young rider classification) wore the yellow jersey of race leader.)	Toms Skujiņš (Note: On Stages 4 to 6, Daniel Oss (second in the mountains classification) wore the polka dot jersey as Toms Skujiņš (first in the mountains classification) wore the yellow jersey of race leader.)	Mark Cavendish	Daniel Oss (Note: Oss did not wear this jersey on Stage 4, as he wore the polka dot jersey instead of mountains classification leader Toms Skujiņš. The jersey was worn by Danilo Wyss.)	BMC Racing Team
4	Peter Sagan	Toms Skujiņš	Julian Alaphilippe	Toms Skujiņš	Mark Cavendish	Gregory Daniel	BMC Racing Team
5	Mark Cavendish	Toms Skujiņš	Julian Alaphilippe	Toms Skujiņš	Mark Cavendish	Danilo Wyss	BMC Racing Team
6	Peter Sagan	Peter Sagan	Julian Alaphilippe	Toms Skujiņš	Mark Cavendish	not awarded	BMC Racing Team
7	Julian Alaphilippe	Julian Alaphilippe	Julian Alaphilippe	Daniel Oss	Mark Cavendish	Lachlan Morton	Team Sky
8	Mark Cavendish	Peter Sagan	Julian Alaphilippe	Daniel Oss	Mark Cavendish	Oscar Clark	Team Sky
Final		Peter Sagan	Julian Alaphilippe	Daniel Oss	Mark Cavendish	not awarded	Team Sky

== Classification standings ==
Legend
Yellow jersey	Denotes the leader of the General classification	Polka dot jersey	Denotes the leader of the Mountains classification
Green jersey	Denotes the leader of the Sprints classification	White jersey	Denotes the leader of the Young rider classification

=== General classification ===
Final general classification
Rank	Rider	Team	Time
1	Peter Sagan (SVK)	Tinkoff–Saxo	28h 13' 12"
2	Julian Alaphilippe (FRA)	Etixx–Quick-Step	+ 3"
3	Sergio Henao (COL)	Team Sky	+ 37"
4	Joe Dombrowski (USA)	Cannondale–Garmin	+ 1' 14"
5	Robert Gesink (NED)	LottoNL–Jumbo	+ 1' 15"
6	Haimar Zubeldia (ESP)	Trek Factory Racing	+ 1' 16"
7	Ian Boswell (USA)	Team Sky	+ 1' 23"
8	Riccardo Zoidl (AUT)	Trek Factory Racing	+ 1' 24"
9	Peter Kennaugh (GBR)	Team Sky	+ 1' 44"
10	Rob Britton (CAN)	Team SmartStop	+ 2' 10"

=== Sprints classification ===
Final sprints classification
Rank	Rider	Team	Points
1	Mark Cavendish (GBR)	Etixx–Quick-Step	75
2	Peter Sagan (SVK)	Tinkoff–Saxo	62
3	Wouter Wippert (NED)	Drapac Professional Cycling	38
4	Jempy Drucker (LUX)	BMC Racing Team	26
5	Zico Waeytens (BEL)	Team Giant–Alpecin	22
6	Will Clarke (AUS)	Drapac Professional Cycling	20
7	John Murphy (USA)	UnitedHealthcare	19
8	Tyler Farrar (USA)	MTN–Qhubeka	19
9	Lucas Sebastián Haedo (ARG)	Jamis–Hagens Berman	16
10	Robin Carpenter (USA)	Hincapie Racing Team	15

=== Young rider classification ===
Final young rider classification
Rank	Rider	Team	Time
1	Julian Alaphilippe (FRA)	Etixx–Quick-Step	28h 13' 15"
2	Tao Geoghegan Hart (GBR)	Axeon Cycling Team	+ 2' 33"
3	Jay McCarthy (AUS)	Tinkoff–Saxo	+ 3' 13"
4	Manuel Senni (ITA)	BMC Racing Team	+ 4' 43"
5	Dion Smith (NZL)	Hincapie Racing Team	+ 4' 52"
6	Lawson Craddock (USA)	Team Giant–Alpecin	+ 9' 35"
7	Ruben Guerreiro (POR)	Axeon Cycling Team	+ 12' 47"
8	James Oram (NZL)	Axeon Cycling Team	+ 20' 38"
9	Jasper Stuyven (BEL)	Trek Factory Racing	+ 22' 59"
10	Robin Carpenter (USA)	Hincapie Racing Team	+ 25' 43"

=== Mountains classification ===
Final mountains classification
Rank	Rider	Team	Points
1	Daniel Oss (ITA)	BMC Racing Team	48
2	Toms Skujiņš (LAT)	Hincapie Racing Team	33
3	Lachlan Morton (AUS)	Jelly Belly–Maxxis	20
4	Julian Alaphilippe (FRA)	Etixx–Quick-Step	14
5	Johann van Zyl (RSA)	MTN–Qhubeka	14
6	Evan Huffman (USA)	Team SmartStop	13
7	Jonathan Clarke (AUS)	UnitedHealthcare	13
8	Sergio Henao (COL)	Team Sky	11
9	Ian Boswell (USA)	Team Sky	11
10	Danilo Wyss (SWI)	BMC Racing Team	10

=== Teams classification ===
Final teams classification
Rank	Team	Time
1	Team Sky	84h 43' 10"
2	Trek Factory Racing	+ 4' 06"
3	BMC Racing Team	+ 5' 35"
4	Tinkoff–Saxo	+ 8' 40"
5	Cannondale–Garmin	+ 22' 01"
6	Axeon Cycling Team	+ 23' 37"
7	LottoNL–Jumbo	+ 38' 24"
8	Hincapie Racing Team	+ 42' 52"
9	Team Giant–Alpecin	+ 45' 22"
10	Team SmartStop	+ 46' 28"
