= 2009 Nature Valley Grand Prix =

Race details
- Dates: June 10—14
- Stages: 6
- Winning time: 9h 28' 29"

Results
Jersey awarded to the overall winner	Winner	Rory Sutherland (AUS)	(OUCH–Maxxis)
	Second	Tom Zirbel (USA)	(Bissell)
	Third	Lucas Sebastian Haedo (ARG)	(Colavita–Sutter Home)
Jersey awarded to the mountains classification winner	Mountains	Chad Gerlach (USA)	(Amore & Vita–McDonald's)
Jersey awarded to the youth classification winner	Youth	Bobby Sweeting (USA)	(Land Rover-ORBEA)
Jersey awarded to the sprints classification winner	Sprints	Thomas Soladay (USA)	(Team Mountain Khakis)
	Team	Bissell	

The 2009 Nature Valley Grand Prix was the 9th edition of the Nature Valley Grand Prix stage race. It took place from June 10 through June 14 as part of the USA Cycling National Racing Calendar. The winner was Australian rider Rory Sutherland of OUCH–Maxxis who won the race on the final criterium. The race included an Individual Time Trial, two road races and three criteriums.

== Teams ==
The teams participating in the race were:

- Amore & Vita–McDonald's
- BikeReg.com
- Bissell
- Ciclismo Racing
- Colavita–Sutter Home
- CRCA/Empire
- Flander-Minneapolis
- GrandStay Hotels
- Hagens Berman
- IS Corp
- Jelly Belly Cycling Team
- Jittery Joe's
- Kenda Pro
- Land Rover-Orbea
- Mountain Khaki's
- Nature Valley Amateur team
- OUCH–Maxxis
- Team Type 1
- Texas Road House
- Trade Wind Energy
- Waste Management
- Wheel & Sprocket

== Stages ==
=== Stage 1 ===
10 June 2009 – Saint Paul, 4.5 mi (ITT)

Stage 1 Results

	Cyclist	Team	Time
1	Tom Zirbel (USA)	Bissell	12' 36"
2	Rory Sutherland (AUS)	OUCH–Maxxis	+ 13"
3	Peter Latham (NZL)	Bissell	+ 18"
4	Benjamin Jacques-Maynes (USA)	Bissell	+ 20"
5	John Murphy (USA)	OUCH–Maxxis	+ 22"

General Classification after Stage 1

	Cyclist	Team	Time
1	Tom Zirbel (USA)	Bissell	12' 36"
2	Rory Sutherland (AUS)	OUCH–Maxxis	+ 13"
3	Peter Latham (NZL)	Bissell	+ 18"
4	Benjamin Jacques-Maynes (USA)	Bissell	+ 20"
5	John Murphy (USA)	OUCH–Maxxis	+ 22"

=== Stage 2 ===
10 June 2009 – Saint Paul, 60 min

Stage 2 Results

	Cyclist	Team	Time
1	Lucas Sebastian Haedo (ARG)	Colavita–Sutter Home	57' 32"
2	Thomas Soladay (USA)	Team Mountain Khakis	s.t.
3	Alejandro Alberto Borrajo (ARG)	Colavita–Sutter Home	s.t.
4	Charles Bradley Huff (USA)	Jelly Belly Cycling Team	s.t.
5	Rory Sutherland (AUS)	OUCH–Maxxis	s.t.

General Classification after Stage 2

	Cyclist	Team	Time
1	Tom Zirbel (USA)	Bissell	1h 10' 14"
2	Rory Sutherland (AUS)	OUCH–Maxxis	+ 7"
3	Peter Latham (NZL)	Bissell	+ 12"
4	Karl Menzies (AUS)	OUCH–Maxxis	+ 20"
5	Benjamin Jacques-Maynes (USA)	Bissell	s.t.

=== Stage 3 ===
11 June 2009 – Cannon Falls, 60 mi

Stage 3 Results

	Cyclist	Team	Time
1	Alejandro Borrajo (ARG)	Colavita–Sutter Home	
2	Lucas Sebastian Haedo (ARG)	Colavita–Sutter Home	
3	John Murphy (USA)	OUCH–Maxxis	
4	Yuriy Metlushenko (UKR)	Amore & Vita–McDonald's	
5	Kenneth Hanson (USA)	Team Type 1	

General Classification after Stage 3

	Cyclist	Team	Time
1	Tom Zirbel (USA)	Bissell	3h 33' 08"
2	Rory Sutherland (AUS)	OUCH–Maxxis	+ 7"
3	Peter Latham (NZL)	Bissell	+ 12"
4	John Murphy (USA)	OUCH–Maxxis	+ 16"
5	Karl Menzies (AUS)	OUCH–Maxxis	+ 20"

=== Stage 4 ===
12 June 2009 – Uptown Minneapolis, 60 min

Stage 4 Results

	Cyclist	Team	Time
1	Lucas Sebastian Haedo (ARG)	Colavita–Sutter Home	1h 09' 55"
2	Charles Huff (USA)	Jelly Belly Cycling Team	+ 0"
3	Andrew Pinfold (CAN)	OUCH–Maxxis	+ 0"
4	John Murphy (USA)	OUCH–Maxxis	+ 0"
5	Yuriy Metlushenko (UKR)	Amore & Vita–McDonald's	+ 0"

General Classification after Stage 4

	Cyclist	Team	Time
1	Tom Zirbel (USA)	Bissell	4h 43' 03"
2	Rory Sutherland (AUS)	OUCH–Maxxis	+ 7"
3	Lucas Sebastian Haedo (ARG)	Colavita–Sutter Home	+ 10"
4	Peter Latham (NZL)	Bissell	+ 12"
5	John Murphy (USA)	OUCH–Maxxis	+ 16"

=== Stage 5 ===
13 June 2009 – Mankato, 86 mi

Stage 5 Results

	Cyclist	Team	Time
1	Andrew Crater (USA)	Wheel & Sprocket	3h 34' 47"
2	Chad Gerlach (USA)	Amore & Vita–McDonald's	s.t.
3	Mike Northey (USA)	Land Rover-ORBEA	s.t.
4	Phillip Mamos (GER)	Amore & Vita–McDonald's	+ 10"
5	Anthony Colby (USA)	Colavita–Sutter Home	+ 10"

General Classification after Stage 5

	Cyclist	Team	Time
1	Tom Zirbel (USA)	Bissell	8h 18' 06"
2	Rory Sutherland (AUS)	OUCH–Maxxis	+ 7"
3	Lucas Sebastian Haedo (ARG)	Colavita–Sutter Home	+ 10"
4	Mike Creed (USA)	Team Type 1	+ 23"
5	Peter Latham (NZL)	Bissell	+ 23"

=== Stage 6 ===
14 June 2009 – Stillwater, 50 min

Stage 6 Results

	Cyclist	Team	Time
1	Phillip Mamos (GER)	Amore & Vita–McDonald's	1h 10' 14"
2	Anthony Colby (USA)	Colavita–Sutter Home	+ 2"
3	Rory Sutherland (AUS)	OUCH–Maxxis	+ 2"
4	Luis Romero Amaran (CUB)	Colavita–Sutter Home	+ 10"
5	Tom Zirbel (USA)	Bissell	+ 10"

General Classification after Stage 6

	Cyclist	Team	Time
1	Rory Sutherland (AUS)	OUCH–Maxxis	9h 28' 29"
2	Tom Zirbel (USA)	Bissell	+ 1"
3	Lucas Sebastian Haedo (ARG)	Colavita–Sutter Home	+ 21"
4	Tyler Wren (USA)	Colavita–Sutter Home	+ 29"
5	Anthony Colby (USA)	Colavita–Sutter Home	+ 35"

== Classification leadership progress table ==
Stage	Winner	General classification	Mountains classification	Points classification	Youth classification	Team Classification
1	Tom Zirbel	Tom Zirbel	Tom Zirbel	Tom Zirbel	Nick Frey	Bissell
2	Lucas Sebastian Haedo	Tom Zirbel	Tom Zirbel	Thomas Soladay	Nick Frey	Bissell
3	Alejandro Borrajo	Tom Zirbel	Kenneth Hanson	Thomas Soladay	Nick Frey	Bissell
4	Lucas Sebastian Haedo	Tom Zirbel	Kenneth Hanson	Thomas Soladay	Nick Frey	Bissell
5	Andrew Crater	Tom Zirbel	Chad Gerlach	Thomas Soladay	Mike Northey	Bissell
6	Phillip Mamos	Rory Sutherland	Chad Gerlach	Thomas Soladay	Bobby Sweeting	Bissell
Final		Rory Sutherland	Chad Gerlach	Thomas Soladay	Bobby Sweeting	Bissell
