= Tom Zirbel =

American road bicycle racer

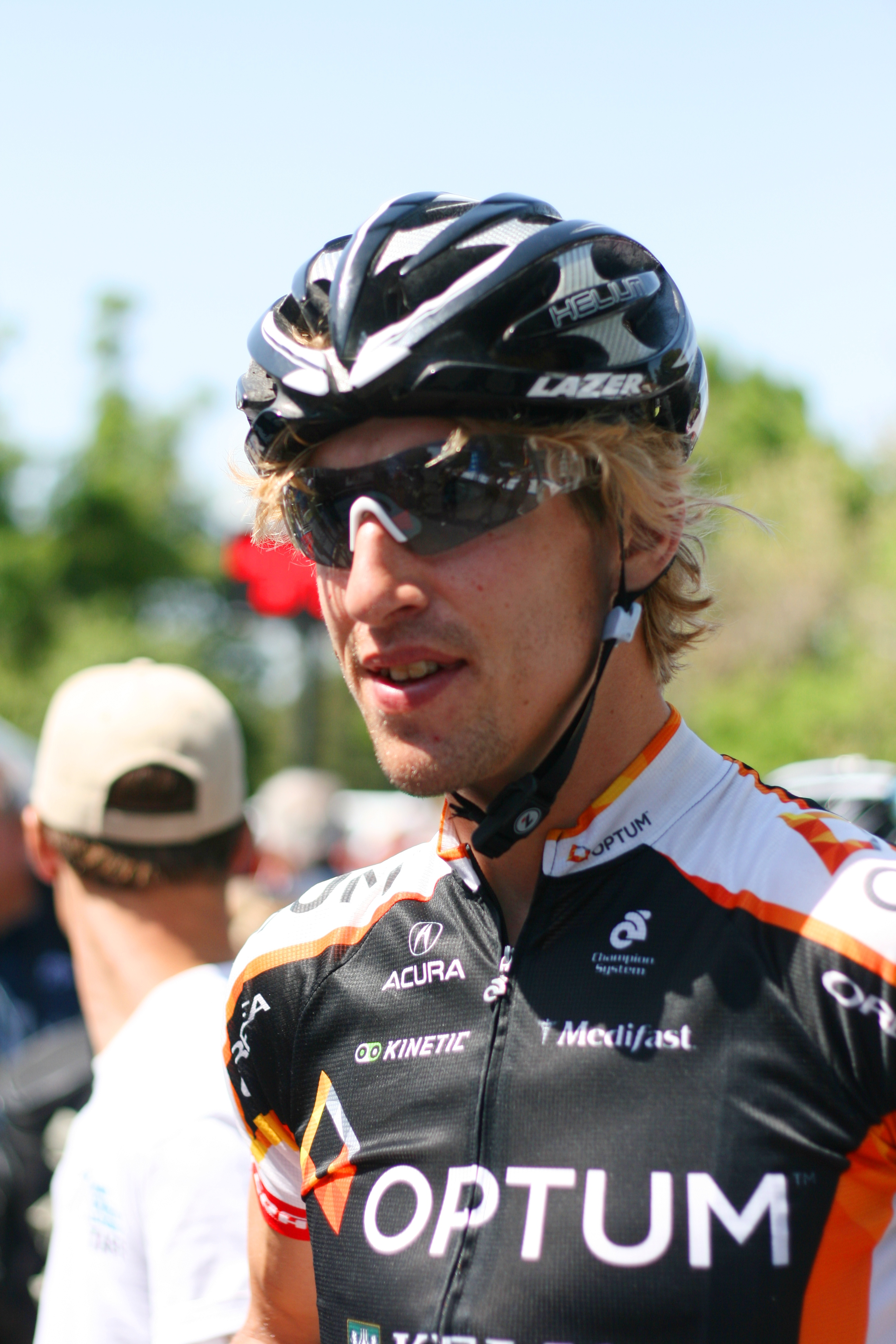
- Zirbel at the 2012 Tour of California

Personal information
- Born: October 30, 1978 (age 47) Clear Lake, Iowa, United States

Cycling career
- Sport: Cycling
- Current team: Retired
- Discipline: Road
- Role: Rider
- Rider type: Time trialist

Professional teams
- 2006–2009: Priority Health
- 2011: Jamis–Sutter Home
- 2012–2016: Optum–Kelly Benefit Strategies

Tom Zirbel (born October 30, 1978) is an American former road bicycle racing cyclist, who rode professionally between 2006 and 2016 for the Bissell, Jamis–Sutter Home and Rally Cycling teams.

== Career ==
Born in Clear Lake, Iowa, Zirbel rode for Priority Health from 2006 to 2009. He came fourth in the UCI Road World Championships time trial in September 2009, and had signed to join UCI ProTour team Garmin–Transitions the following season.

In December 2009, a urine test taken at the United States National Time Trial Championships the previous August, in which Zirbel came second, tested positive for dehydroepiandrosterone (DHEA). Zirbel denied having taken the substance knowingly, but he nevertheless voluntarily accepted a two-year suspension, and immediately announced his retirement. His suspension was reduced in March 2011 to 18 months, which had already been served, in recognition of assistance given to the United States Anti-Doping Agency (USADA). He suggested that, despite earlier comments about retiring, he would seek to resume his racing career. He maintains that he ingested the banned product inadvertently.

In 2011, Zirbel rode for Jamis–Sutter Home. On May 28, 2011, he placed 2nd in the United States National Time Trial Championships, behind David Zabriskie. He joined Optum–Kelly Benefit Strategies for the 2012 season. In an interview with cyclingnews.com in early 2016, Zirbel confirmed that the upcoming season would be his last as a professional cyclist before retiring. In September of that year, he set a new American national hour record in Aguascalientes, Mexico, completing 53.037 kilometres (32.956 miles) to break the 1997 record of 51.505 kilometres (32.004 miles) set by Norman Alvis.

== Major results ==
2007
Tour of Southland

1st Stages 1 (ITT) & 9

10th Tour de Leelanau
2008
1st Stage 3 Tour of the Gila
1st Stage 5 Tour of Utah
2nd Time trial, National Road Championships
3rd Overall Tour of Elk Grove

1st Prologue

8th Overall Cascade Cycling Classic
2009
2nd Time trial, National Road Championships
2nd Overall Redlands Bicycle Classic
2nd Overall Nature Valley Grand Prix

1st Stage 1 (ITT)

4th Time trial, UCI Road World Championships
4th Overall Tour of Missouri
2011
2nd Time trial, National Road Championships
3rd Univest Grand Prix
2012
2nd Overall Vuelta del Uruguay
5th Chrono Champenois
6th Overall Tour of Elk Grove

1st Stage 1 (ITT)

7th Duo Normand (with Scott Zwizanski)
2013
1st Time trial, National Road Championships
1st Stage 4 Volta ao Alentejo
9th Overall Tour of the Gila

1st Stage 3 (ITT)

2014
2nd Time trial, National Road Championships
2015
1st Stage 3 (ITT) Tour of the Gila
2016
1st Stage 3 (ITT) Tour of the Gila
2nd Time trial, National Road Championships

Sporting positions
Preceded by David Zabriskie	United States National Time Trial; Champion; 2013	Succeeded by Taylor Phinney
