= Travis Livermon =

American cyclist (born 1988)

- Travis Livermon (USA). UCI Cyclocross World Cup, Heusden-Zolder, Belgium, 2015.

Personal information
- Full name: Travis Livermon
- Born: April 2, 1988 (age 38) United States

Cycling career
- Sport: Cycling
- Disciplines: Road; Cyclo-cross
- Role: Rider

Amateur teams
- 2011: Team Mountain Khakis
- 2018–2019: Enfusion / Endurance Collective

Professional teams
- 2012–2015: Team Smartstop–Mountain Khakis
- 2016: Astellas

Travis Livermon (born April 2, 1988) is an American cyclist, who most recently rode for American amateur team Endurance Collective.
