= Adam Myerson =

American professional bicycle racer

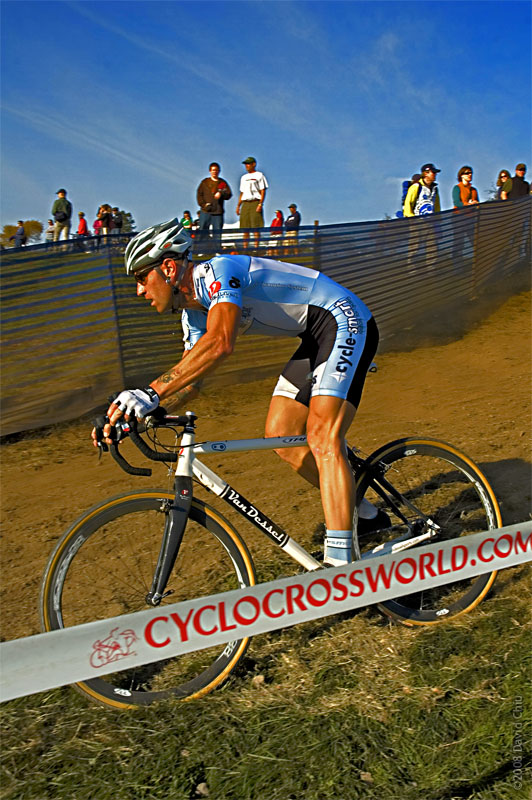
- Adam Myerson (Cycle-Smart) racing at Stage Fort Park in Gloucester, MA at the 2008 edition of the Grand Prix of Gloucester

Personal information
- Full name: Adam Myerson
- Born: May 9, 1972 (age 54) Norwood, Massachusetts, USA
- Height: 5 ft 10 in (1.78 m)

Cycling career
- Sport: Cycling
- Current team: Cycle-Smart
- Disciplines: Road; Cyclo-cross
- Role: Rider
- Rider type: Sprinter

Amateur teams
- 1991: Mass Bay Road Club
- 1992: Team Healthshare
- 1993: Team Ringle/Finals
- 1994–1995: G.S. Mengoni/Colnago
- 1996-1998: Breakaway Courier Systems
- 1999: Northampton Cycling Club
- 2000: Breakaway Courier Systems
- 2001–2002: G.S. Mengoni USA
- 2011: Mountain Khakis–Jittery Joe’s
- 2016–: Cycle-Smart

Professional teams
- 2003: Sportsbook.com Cycling Team
- 2004: Sharper Image–Mathis Brothers Furniture
- 2005–2007: Nerac Pro Cycling Team
- 2008–2014: Team Mountain Khakis
- 2015: Astellas

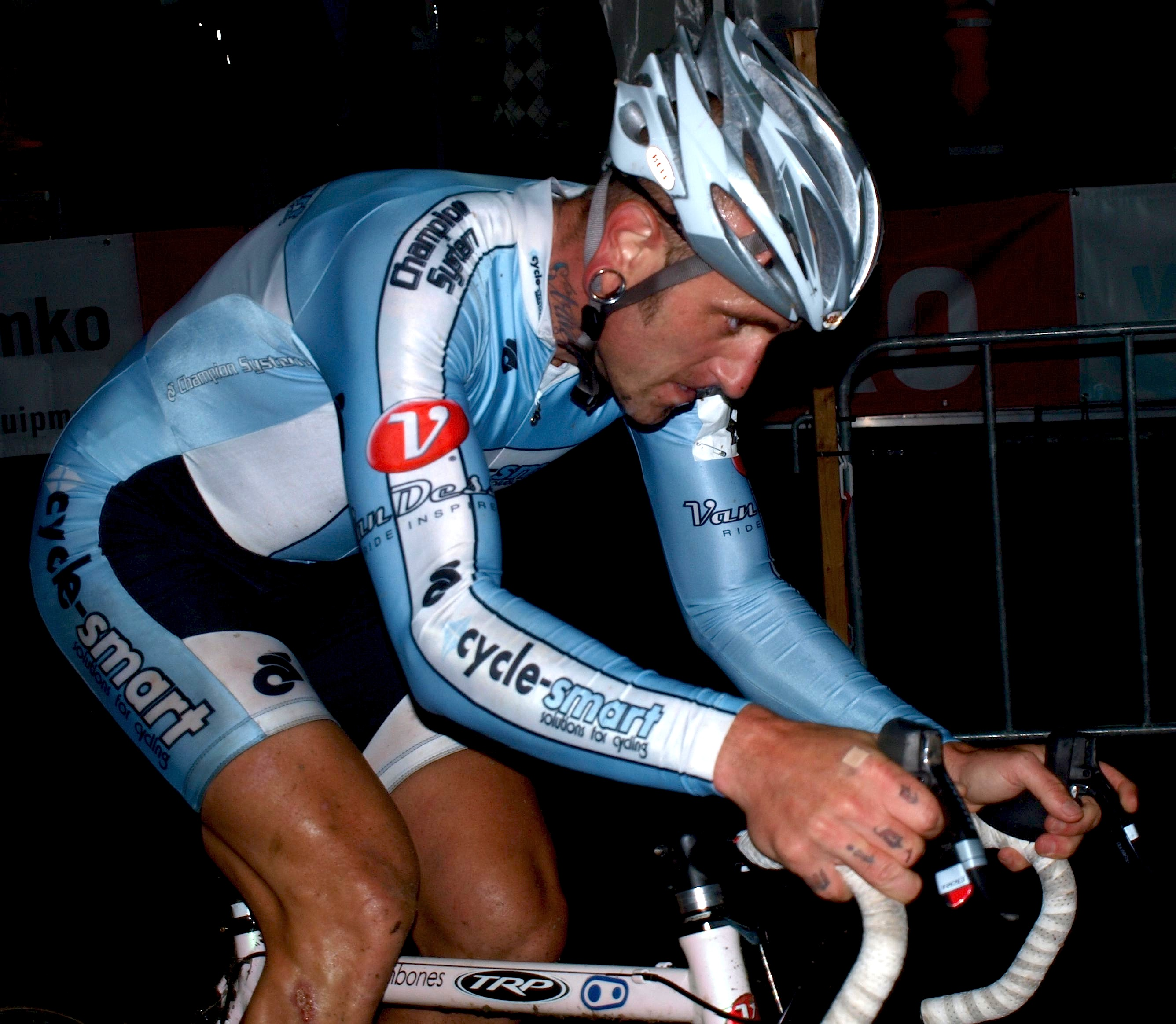
Myerson racing in Europe.

Adam Myerson (born May 9, 1972) is an American professional bicycle racer specializing in cyclo-cross and criterium racing.

Adam is an active race promoter, series organizer, and coach; was the first American on the Union Cycliste Internationale Cyclo-cross commission (until 2009) as well as the AIOC-Cross Management Committee; and was the USA Cycling Collegiate National Cyclocross Champion in 1997. Myerson lives in Dorchester, Massachusetts, USA.

Myerson has been a vegetarian since 1989, primarily for animal rights reasons. He was also a strict vegan from the early 2000s to 2006. Myerson has published several articles on being a meat-free endurance athlete. He is an outspoken anti-doping advocate as well.

He is the owner and head coach of Cycle-Smart, Inc.

== Major results ==
=== Cyclo-cross ===
1997
1st National Collegiate Championships
2003–2004
2nd Michael R. Rabe Midwest Cyclo-Cross
2008–2009
3rd NBX Grand Prix of Cross Day 1
2009–2010
2nd Nittany Lion Cross
2nd NBX Grand Prix of Cross Day 1
3rd NBX Grand Prix of Cross Day 2
3rd HPCX
3rd Charm City Cross
2010–2011
1st Verge New England Championship Cyclocross Series
1st Downeast Cyclocross Day 2
1st NBX Grand Prix of Cross Day 1
2nd NBX Grand Prix of Cross Day 2
2nd The Cycle-Smart International Day 2
2nd Nittany Lion Cross
2nd HPCX
3rd Baystate Cyclo-cross Day 1
3rd Baystate Cyclo-cross Day 2
2011–2012
3rd National Masters 40-45 Championships
3rd Kingsport Cyclo-cross Cup
2013–2014
3rd Kingsport Cyclo-cross Cup
2016–2017
1st National Masters 45-49 Championships
2017–2018
1st National Masters 45-49 Championships
2018–2019
1st Pan American Masters 45-54 Championships
1st National Masters 45-49 Championships
2021–2022
1st Pan American Masters 50-54 Championships

=== Road ===
2003
1st Stage 8 FBD Milk Rás
2007
3rd Harlem Skyscraper Classic
4th Overall USA Crits
2008
2nd Overall USA Crits
2009
3rd Overall USA CRITS
5th Criterium, National Road Championships
2015
1st Stage 8 Tour of America's Dairyland
2nd Tour of Somerville
2017
1st Road race, National Masters 45-49 Championships
3rd Clarendon Cup
2018
1st Criterium, National Masters 45-49 Championships
