= Thomas Soladay =

American bicycle racer

Personal information
- Full name: Thomas Soladay
- Born: August 20, 1983 (age 43) Bethesda, Maryland, United States

Cycling career
- Sport: Cycling
- Current team: Human Powered Health
- Discipline: Road
- Role: Rider (retired); Team manager

Amateur team
- 2008: Time

Professional teams
- 2009: Team Mountain Khakis
- 2010: Team Type 1
- 2011–2017: Kelly Benefit Strategies–OptumHealth

Managerial team
- 2018–2022: Rally Cycling (communications director)

Thomas Soladay (born August 20, 1983) is an American former professional racing cyclist, who competed professionally between 2009 and 2017 for the Team Mountain Khakis, Team Type 1 and Rally Cycling teams. He worked as the communications director for the Human Powered Health team.

He rode in the men's team time trial at the 2015 UCI Road World Championships in Richmond, Virginia.

== Major results ==
2008
9th US Air Force Cycling Classic
2011
International Cycling Classic

1st Stages 9 & 16

2013
6th Tour de Delta
2014
7th Bucks County Classic
2016
5th White Spot / Delta Road Race

== Post-racing career ==
Tom is currently the Director of Communications & Marketing for the College of Agriculture and Life Sciences at Virginia Tech and Virginia Cooperative Extension.
