= Oscar Clark =

American cyclist

Personal information
- Born: February 20, 1989 (age 37) Atlanta, Georgia, U.S.

Cycling career
- Sport: Cycling
- Current team: Retired
- Discipline: Road
- Role: Rider

Professional teams
- 2010: Mountain Khakis–Jittery Joe’s
- 2011: Realcyclist.com Cycling Team
- 2012–2017: BMC–Hincapie Sportswear Team

Oscar Clark (born February 20, 1989, in Atlanta, Georgia) is an American former road racing cyclist who competed professionally between 2010 and 2017 for the Mountain Khakis–Jittery Joe’s, Realcyclist.com Cycling Team and Holowesko Citadel Racing Team squads.

== Major results ==
2012
1st Stage 5 Tour of China II
2013
1st Stage 5 Flèche du Sud
2016
1st The Reading 120
1st Fort McLellan Road Race
2017
1st Bucks County Classic
