= Lucas Sebastián Haedo =

Argentine cyclist

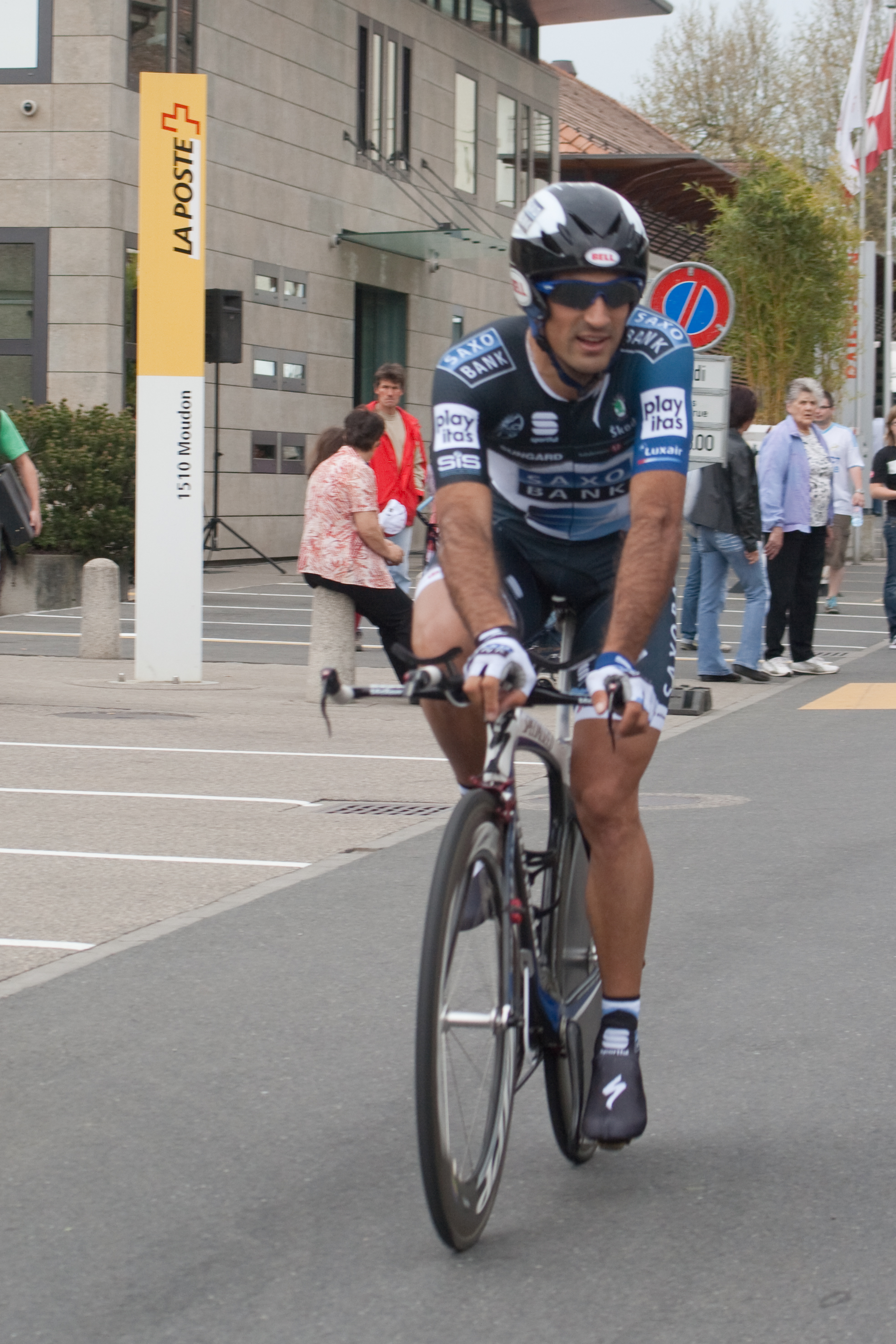
- Haedo at the 2010 Tour de Romandie.

Personal information
- Full name: Lucas Sebastián Haedo
- Born: 18 April 1983 (age 43) Chascomús, Buenos Aires, Argentina
- Height: 1.73 m (5 ft 8 in)
- Weight: 64 kg (141 lb)

Cycling career
- Sport: Cycling
- Current team: Retired
- Discipline: Road
- Role: Rider
- Rider type: Sprinter

Amateur team
- 2005–2006: Diputacion León–Idea–Danis

Professional teams
- 2007: Rock Racing
- 2008–2009: Colavita–Sutter Home
- 2010–2012: Team Saxo Bank
- 2013: Cannondale
- 2014: Skydive Dubai Pro Cycling
- 2015–2016: Jamis–Hagens Berman
- 2017–2018: UnitedHealthcare

Lucas Sebastián Haedo (born 18 April 1983) is an Argentine former road racing cyclist from Chascomús, Buenos Aires. He competed as a professional from 2007 to 2018, for the Rock Racing, Saxo Bank–Tinkoff Bank, Cannondale, Skydive Dubai Pro Cycling, Team Jamis and UnitedHealthcare teams. He is the younger brother of fellow racing cyclist Juan José Haedo.

== Major results ==
2005
Vuelta Ciclista a León

1st Stages 3 & 5

2008
1st Crystal Cup
1st Tour of Somerville
2009
1st Tour of Somerville
1st Stage 2 Tour de San Luis
1st Stage 2 Nature Valley Grand Prix
8th Philadelphia International Championship
2012
4th Châteauroux Classic
2014
4th Overall Tour of Thailand

1st Stage 1

6th Melaka Governor's Cup
2015
Redlands Bicycle Classic

1st Stages 1 & 5

1st Stage 4 Joe Martin Stage Race
1st Stage 4 Tour of the Gila
2016
Vuelta a Colombia

1st Stages 3 & 5

1st Stage 2 Joe Martin Stage Race
4th Philadelphia International Cycling Classic
2017
1st Stage 2 Joe Martin Stage Race
2018
8th Overall Tour de Korea

=== Grand Tour general classification results timeline ===
Grand Tour	2010	2011	2012	2013
Giro d'Italia	128	—	128	—
Tour de France	—	—	—	—
Vuelta a España	—	—	—	139

Legend
—	Did not compete
DNF	Did not finish
