= Andrew Crater =

American cyclist

Andrew Crater (born February 20, 1978, in Greensboro, North Carolina) is an American ex-professional road racing cyclist. On September 9, 2010, it was announced by the United States Anti-Doping Agency (USADA) that Crater accepted a three-month period of ineligibility for an anti-doping rule violation. His period of ineligibility began on September 7, 2010, the day he accepted the sanction. However, the period of ineligibility was suspended and reduced to time served because of Crater's cooperation with USADA.

Crater tested positive for Carboxy THC, a metabolite of marijuana in the class of Cannabinoids, in a sample collected on August 1, 2010, at the Tour of Elk Grove, in Elk Grove Village, Illinois.
