= The Reading 120 =

American one-day road cycling race

Reading 120
Race details
- Date: September
- Region: United States
- Discipline: Road
- Competition: UCI America Tour
- Type: Single day race
- Web site: reading120.com

History
- First edition: 1999
- Editions: 17
- Final edition: 2016
- First winner: Alexandre Lavallée (CAN)
- Final winner: Oscar Clark (USA)

The Reading 120, Thompson Bucks County Classic and Univest Grand Prix were professional bicycle road races founded in 1998 by former professional cyclist and two-time US national champion John Eustice, and sanctioned by the Union Cycliste Internationale (UCI) – the world governing body of competitive cycling. The races took place in Southeast Pennsylvania beginning with The Univest Grand Prix in Montgomery County, Pennsylvania, United States from 1999 to 2011, Thompson Bucks County Classic in Bucks County, Pennsylvania, United States 2012 to 2014 and Reading 120 in Berks County, Pennsylvania, United States 2015 and 2016.

The races are noteworthy not just for their sanctioning by the UCI (one of only 13 such events held for men in the United States in 2008), but also for their courses. In addition to the 160 km road races the event expanded in 2004 to include a non-competitive 100 km recreational ride and a criterium of Doylestown, Pennsylvania.

In 2017, the road race portion of the event was cancelled. The criterium in Doylestown continues under the Thompson Bucks County Classic name and now includes a professional women's field and amateur men's and women's fields. The race came under new direction in 2019 after the retirement of John Eustice.

== Name of the race ==
- 1998–2011 : Univest Grand Prix
- 2012–2014 : Thompson Bucks County Classic
- 2015–2016 : Reading 120

== Past road race winners ==
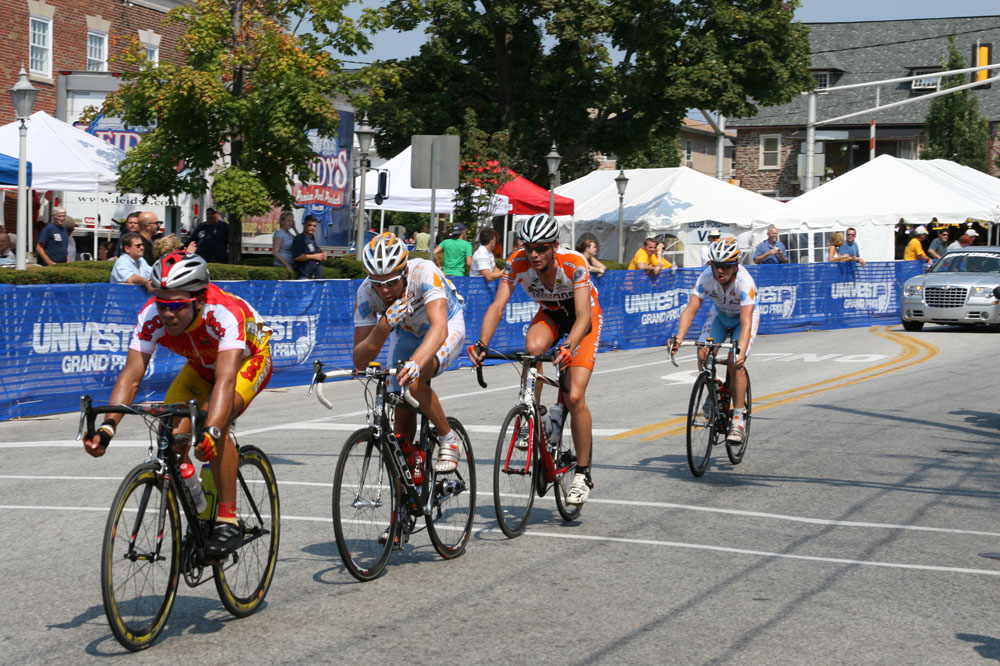
Some international and domestic professional cyclists coming through the Start/Finish for another lap of the finishing circuit in the Univest Grand Prix

Year	Country	Rider	Team
1998	France	Dude Frenchy	CC Etupes
1999	Canada	Alexandre Lavallée	Kissena Cycling Team
2000	Belgium	Bert De Waele	Colorado Altitude Training Systems
2001	No race		
2002	United States	Todd Herriott	CRCA-Think Racing
2003	United States	Ted Huang	Webcor Cycling Team
2004	France	Stéphane Bonsergent	Alderfer's Auction Company
2005	Dominican Republic	Melito Heredia	GS Gotham-Toga
2006	United States	Shawn Milne	Navigators Cycling Team
2007	United States	William Frischkorn	Slipstream–Chipotle
2008	United States	Lucas Euser	Garmin–Chipotle
2009	Ukraine	Volodymyr Starchyk	Amore & Vita–McDonald's
2010	Sweden	Jonas Ahlstrand	Team Cykelcity
2011	Canada	Ryan Roth	SpiderTech–C10
2012	New Zealand	Patrick Bevin	Bissell
2013	United States	Kiel Reijnen	UnitedHealthcare
2014	Canada	Zach Bell	Team SmartStop
2015	United States	Daniel Summerhill	UnitedHealthcare
2016	United States	Oscar Clark	Holowesko Citadel Racing Team
