= Team SmartStop =

American professional cycling team

Team information
- UCI code: SSC
- Registered: United States
- Founded: 2008
- Disbanded: 2015
- Discipline: Road
- Status: UCI Continental
- Bicycles: Wilier
- Website: Team home page

Key personnel
- General manager: James Bennett
- Team manager: Michael Creed

Team name history
- 2008 Jan. 2009 – April 2009 May 2009 – Dec. 2009 2010–2011 2012–2013 2014–2015: Time Pro Cycling; Mountain Khakis; Mountain Khakis Ep-No; Mountain Khakis-Jittery Joe's; SmartStop-Mountain Khakis; SmartStop

Team SmartStop was an American UCI Continental cycling team that was formed in 2008 when the team Time was disbanded. SmartStop was originally named Mountain Khakis. Team SmartStop was directed by former professional cyclist Mike Creed, who in his own right had a very successful international cycling career. After coming on board with Team SmartStop and changing the program to a stage racing team, Creed led the team to many victories in 2014 including the USA Pro Road Race National Championships and the UCI America's Tour. It disbanded after the 2015 season. In January 2016 riders came forward saying their wages for 2015 had not been fully paid yet.

== 2015 Roster ==
As at 1 January 2015

Rider	Date of birth
Zachary Bell (CAN)	November 14, 1982 (aged 32)
Rob Britton (CAN)	September 22, 1984 (aged 30)
Chris Butler (USA)	February 16, 1988 (aged 26)
Kris Dahl (CAN)	July 7, 1992 (aged 22)
Flavio De Luna (MEX)	October 26, 1990 (aged 24)
Evan Huffman (USA)	January 7, 1990 (aged 24)
Nate King (USA)	September 3, 1987 (aged 27)
Shane Kline (USA)	April 11, 1989 (aged 25)

Rider	Date of birth
Jure Kocjan (SLO)	October 18, 1984 (aged 30)
Julian Kyer (USA)	May 15, 1988 (aged 26)
Travis Livermon (USA)	April 2, 1988 (aged 26)
Eric Marcotte (USA)	February 8, 1980 (aged 34)
Travis McCabe (USA)	May 12, 1989 (aged 25)
Robert Sweeting (USA)	June 5, 1987 (aged 27)
Juan Pablo Villegas (COL)	October 15, 1987 (aged 27)

== Major wins ==
2008
Harlem Skyscraper Classic, Erik Barlevav
Stage 1 Tour of Ohio, David Duncan
Marlton Criterium, Adam Myerson
Louisville Criterium, Adam Myerson
Taylorsville Criterium, Daniel Ramsey
Lenoir Criterium, Daniel Ramsey
Morganton Criterium, Daniel Ramsey
Salem Criterium, Adam Myerson
GP Mengoni, Adam Myerson
San Francisco Criterium, Daniel Ramsey
Winston-Salem Cyclo-cross, Jonathan Hamblen
2009
Salisbury Crossroads Classic, Adam Myerson
Roswell Criterium, Thomas Soladay
Beaufort Criterium, Thomas Soladay
Overall USA Crits Series Speed Week, Mark Hekman
City Bikes Criterium, Erik Barlevav
Stage 3 Tulsa, Daniel Ramsey
Stage 5 Giro di Jersey, Isaac Howe
Greensboro Carolina Cup, Isaac Howe
2010
Atlanta US 100 K Classic, Joey Rosskopf
New Gloucester Cyclo-cross, Adam Myerson
Warwick Cyclo-cross, Adam Myerson
2012
Delray Beach, Benjamin Charles Zawacki
Athens Criterium, Luke Keough
Roswell Criterium, Benjamin Charles Zawacki
Somerville, Luke Keough
Stage 3 Anderson Omnium, Jonathan Hamblen
Boston Criterium, Luke Keough
Southern Pines, Cyclo-cross, Travis Livermon
2013
Dana Point, Shane Kline
Stage 3 Johnson City Omnium, Christopher Uberti
Breinigsville Scratch, Shane Kline
United States National Novices Track Championships, Jackie Simes
United States National Track Championships (Madison), Jackie Simes & Bobby Lea
Madison Cup, Jackie Simes
Madison Cup, Bobby Lea
2014
Stage 1 Vuelta a la Independencia Nacional, Eric Marcotte
Stages 3 & 6 Vuelta a la Independencia Nacional, Jure Kocjan
Abbotsford, Zachary Bell
Stage 3 Redlands Bicycle Classic, Travis McCabe
Winston-Salem Cycling Classic, Travis McCabe
Stage 3 Joe Martin Stage Race, Travis McCabe
United States National Road Race Championships, Eric Marcotte
Overall Grand Prix Cycliste de Saguenay, Jure Kocjan

Stage 4, Jure Kocjan

Stage 5 Nature Valley Grand Prix, Travis McCabe
Canada Under-23 Time Trial National Championships, Kris Dahl
Stage 2 Delta Road race, Shane Kline
Stage 1 Cascade Cycling Classic, Eric Marcotte
Stages 3 & 5 Cascade Cycling Classic, Travis McCabe
Sprints classification Tour of Utah, Jure Kocjan
Bucks County Classic Road Race, Zachary Bell
Bucks County Classic Criterium, Shane Kline
UCI America's Tour Individual, Jure Kocjan
UCI America's Tour Team
2015
Stage 3 Vuelta a la Independencia Nacional, Evan Huffman
Stage 8 Vuelta a la Independencia Nacional, Robert Sweeting
Teams classification Vuelta a la Independencia Nacional
United States National Criterium Championships, Eric Marcotte
Overall Tour of the Gila, Rob Britton
Stage 2 Tour of Utah, Jure Kocjan

== National champions ==
2013
USA National Novices Track Championships, Jackie Simes
USA National Track Championships (Madison), Jackie Simes
USA National Track Championships (Madison), Robert Lea
2014
USA National Road Race Championships, Eric Marcotte
Canada U23 Time Trial National Championships, Kris Dahl
2015
USA National Criterium Championships, Eric Marcotte
Mexico Time Trial National Championships, Flavio De Luna
