= Tour of California =

American multi-day road cycling race

Race details
- Date: May (Formerly in February)
- Region: California, United States
- Discipline: Road
- Competition: UCI World Tour
- Type: Stage race
- Organiser: AEG
- Race director: David Salzman
- Web site: www.amgentourofcalifornia.com

History
- First edition: 2006
- Editions: 14 (as of 2019)
- First winner: Floyd Landis (USA)
- Most wins: Levi Leipheimer (USA) (3 times)
- Most recent: Tadej Pogačar (SLO)

The Tour of California (officially sponsored as the Amgen Tour of California) was an annual professional road cycling stage race on the UCI World Tour and USA Cycling Professional Tour that ran from 2006 to 2019. It was the only event on the top-level World Tour in the United States. The eight-day race covered 650–700 miles (1,045–1,126 km) through the U.S. state of California.

A typical edition might begin in the Sierra Nevada in northern California, travel through the Redwood forests, California's Wine Country and the Pacific Coast, and finish in southern California. The 2009 race crossed the Central Valley from Merced to Fresno, with an excursion through the Sierra Nevada foothills, before crossing over to the coast.

With eight or nine of the 20 UCI ProTour teams (known as ProTeams) usually racing, the Tour of California was one of the most important cycling races in the United States. On November 28, 2006, the UCI upgraded it from 2.1 (category 1) to 2.HC (French: Hors categorie; English: beyond category), the highest rating for races on the UCI Continental Circuits; the Tour of Utah is the only other 2.HC race as of 2019. On August 2, 2016, the UCI upgraded the race to World Tour status and added it to the 2017 UCI World Tour schedule.

The race was originally staged in February, but the 2010 Tour of California was moved to May, the same time that the Giro d'Italia is held. At the time of the move it was considered likely that the number of Americans in the Giro and Italians in the Tour of California would decrease. Tour of California organizers sought to make the race a preparatory event for the Tour de France, believing few riders who seek a serious position in the Tour would ride the Giro. Since the change in schedule, the race continued to be held in May.

The tour was sponsored by Amgen, a California-based biotechnology company most famous for developing the anti anemia drug Erythropoietin (EPO), which has been used by professional cyclists in several blood doping scandals.

In October 2019, organizers announced that the tour would go on hiatus and not continue in 2020, citing a change in "business fundamentals." No plans have been announced regarding if or when the tour will return.

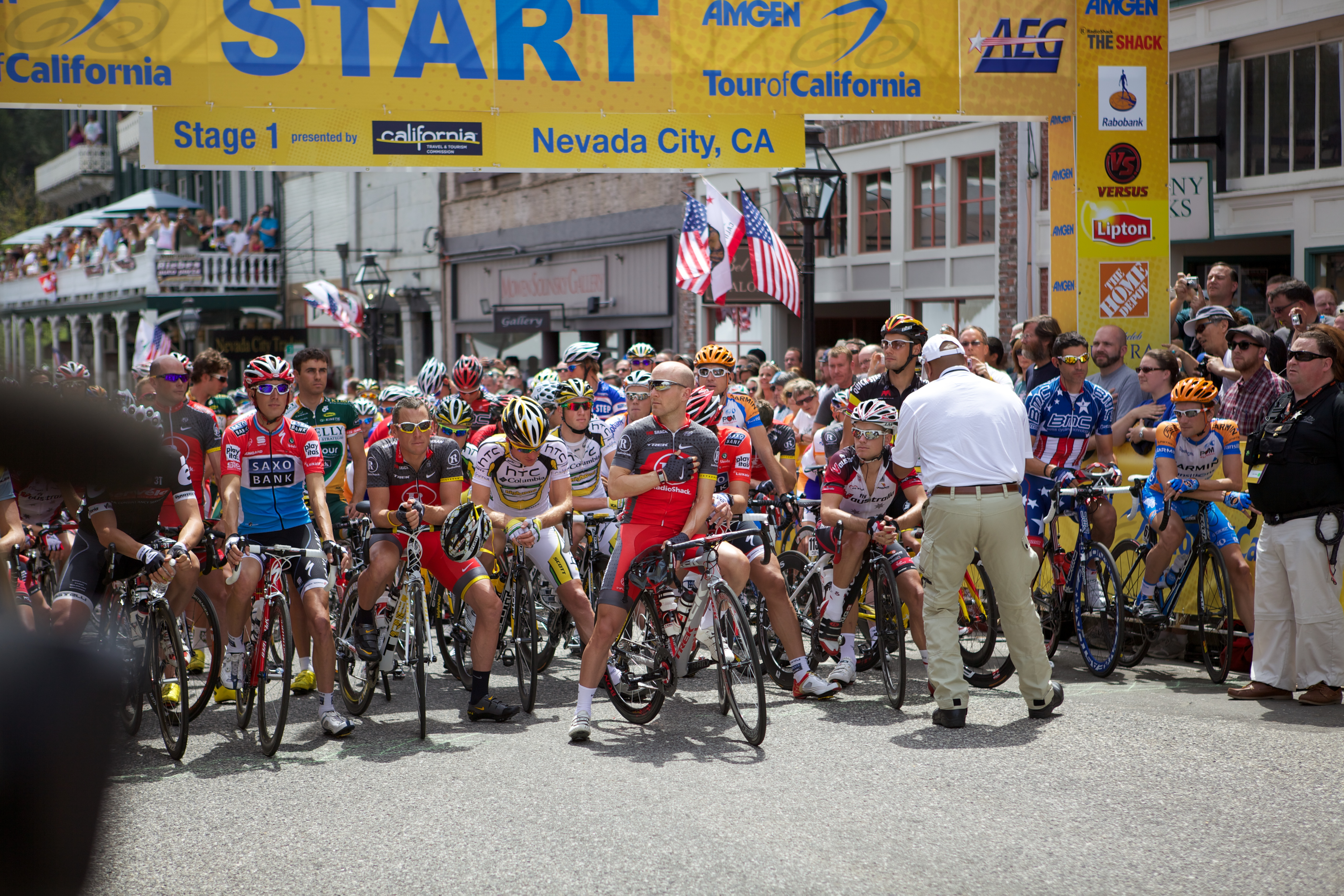
The start of the first leg of the 2010 race in Nevada City

== General Classification Results ==
The leader and overall winner by time after each stage and at the conclusion of the race wore a Yellow Jersey. Originally the leader's jersey was gold, a reference to the California Gold Rush, but in 2009 the jersey color was changed to yellow.

Year	1st place	Team	2nd place	Team	3rd place	Team
2006	Floyd Landis (USA)	Phonak	~~David Zabriskie (USA)~~	~~Team CSC~~	Bobby Julich (USA)	Team CSC
2007	Levi Leipheimer (USA)	Discovery Channel	Jens Voigt (GER)	Team CSC	Jason McCartney (USA)	Discovery Channel
2008	Levi Leipheimer (USA)	Astana	David Millar (GBR)	Slipstream–Chipotle	Christian Vande Velde (USA)	Slipstream–Chipotle
2009	Levi Leipheimer (USA)	Astana	David Zabriskie (USA)	Garmin–Slipstream	Michael Rogers (AUS)	Team Columbia–High Road
2010	Michael Rogers (AUS)	Team HTC–Columbia	David Zabriskie (USA)	Garmin–Transitions	Levi Leipheimer (USA)	Team RadioShack
2011	Chris Horner (USA)	Team RadioShack	Levi Leipheimer (USA)	Team RadioShack	Tom Danielson (USA)	Garmin–Cervélo
2012	Robert Gesink (NED)	Rabobank	David Zabriskie (USA)	Garmin–Barracuda	Tom Danielson (USA)	Garmin–Barracuda
2013	Tejay van Garderen (USA)	BMC Racing Team	Michael Rogers (AUS)	Saxo–Tinkoff	Janier Acevedo (COL)	Jamis–Hagens Berman
2014	Bradley Wiggins (GBR)	Team Sky	Rohan Dennis (AUS)	Garmin–Sharp	Lawson Craddock (USA)	Giant–Shimano
2015	Peter Sagan (SVK)	Tinkoff–Saxo	Julian Alaphilippe (FRA)	Etixx–Quick-Step	Sergio Henao (COL)	Team Sky
2016	Julian Alaphilippe (FRA)	Etixx–Quick-Step	Rohan Dennis (AUS)	BMC Racing Team	Brent Bookwalter (USA)	BMC Racing Team
2017	George Bennett (NZL)	LottoNL–Jumbo	Rafał Majka (POL)	Bora–Hansgrohe	Andrew Talansky (USA)	Cannondale–Drapac
2018	Egan Bernal (COL)	Team Sky	Tejay van Garderen (USA)	BMC Racing Team	Daniel Martínez (COL)	EF Education First–Drapac p/b Cannondale
2019	Tadej Pogačar (SLO)	UAE Team Emirates	Sergio Andrés Higuita García (COL)	EF Education First	Kasper Asgreen (DEN)	Deceuninck–Quick-Step

== Records and Jerseys ==
=== Most Stage Victories ===
- Peter Sagan (SVK), 17 (2019: 1; 2017: 1; 2016: 2; 2015: 2; 2014: 1; 2013: 2; 2012: 5; 2011: 1; 2010: 2)
- Mark Cavendish (GBR), 10 (2016: 1; 2015: 4; 2014: 2; 2010; 2009: 2)
- Levi Leipheimer (USA), 6 (2011; 2009; 2008; 2007: 2; 2006: 1)
- Juan José Haedo (ARG), 5 (2008; 2007: 2; 2006: 2)
- Fernando Gaviria (COL), 3 (2018)
- George Hincapie (USA), 3 (2008; 2006: 2)
- Toms Skujiņš (LAT), 3 (2018; 2016; 2015)
- Dave Zabriskie (USA), 3 (2012; 2011; 2010)
- Egan Bernal (COL), 2 (2018)
- Olaf Pollack (GER), 2 (2006: 2)
- Fabian Cancellara (SUI), 2 (2009; 2008)
- Jens Voigt (GER), 2 (2013; 2007)
- Robert Gesink (NED), 2 (2012; 2008)
- Rohan Dennis (AUS), 2 (2016; 2014)
- Julian Alaphilippe (FRA), 2 (2016; 2015)
- Evan Huffman (USA), 2 (2017)

=== Most Days in Leader's Jersey ===
- Levi Leipheimer (USA), 22 days (2009: 7; 2008: 5; 2007: 8; 2006: 2)
- Tejay van Garderen (USA), 10 days (2019: 4; 2018: 2; 2013: 4)
- Peter Sagan (SVK), 8 days (2019: 1; 2016: 1; 2015: 2; 2012: 4)
- Bradley Wiggins (GBR), 7 days (2014: 7)
- Julian Alaphilippe (FRA), 6 days (2016: 5; 2015: 1)
- Floyd Landis (USA), 5 days (2006: 5)
- Chris Horner (USA), 5 days (2011: 5)
- Egan Bernal (COL), 4 days (2018)
- Mark Cavendish (GBR), 4 days (2015: 2; 2014: 1; 2010; 1)
- Michael Rogers (AUS), 4 days (2010: 4)
- David Zabriskie (USA), 4 days (2010: 2; 2012: 2)
- Rafał Majka (POL), 4 days (2017: 4)

=== Sprints Classification ===
The leader and overall winner by points from intermediate and final sprints wears the Green Jersey.

==== Sprint Winners ====
- 2006 : Olaf Pollack (GER), T-Mobile Team
- 2007 : Juan José Haedo (ARG), Team CSC
- 2008 : Dominique Rollin (CAN), Toyota–United
- 2009 : Mark Cavendish (GBR), Team Columbia–High Road
- 2010 : Peter Sagan (SVK), Liquigas–Doimo
- 2011 : Peter Sagan (SVK), Liquigas–Cannondale
- 2012 : Peter Sagan (SVK), Liquigas–Cannondale
- 2013 : Peter Sagan (SVK), Cannondale
- 2014 : Peter Sagan (SVK), Cannondale
- 2015 : Mark Cavendish (GBR), Etixx–Quick-Step
- 2016 : Peter Sagan (SVK), Tinkoff
- 2017 : Peter Sagan (SVK), Bora–Hansgrohe
- 2018 : Fernando Gaviria (COL), Quick-Step Floors
- 2019 : Kasper Asgreen (DEN), Deceuninck–Quick-Step

==== Most Days in Green Jersey ====
- Peter Sagan (SVK), 42 days (2019: 2; 2017: 5; 2016: 8; 2014: 4; 2013: 5; 2012: 8; 2011: 6; 2010: 4)
- Mark Cavendish (GBR), 18 days (2015: 8; 2014: 3; 2010: 3; 2009: 4)
- Juan José Haedo (ARG), 6 days (2007: 4; 2006: 2)
- Kasper Asgreen (DEN), 5 days (2019)
- Egan Bernal (COL), 4 days (2018)
- George Hincapie (USA), 4 days (2006)
- Dominique Rollin (CAN), 4 days (2008)
- Francisco Mancebo (ESP), 4 days (2009)
- Allan Davis (AUS), 3 days (2007)
- Lieuwe Westra (NED), 3 days (2013)

=== Mountains Classification ===
The leader and overall winner by points in mountain climbs is awarded the Red Jersey (Orange in the past, before 2009) and is known as the race's King of the Mountains or "KOM."

==== KOM Winners ====
- 2006 : Levi Leipheimer (USA), Gerolsteiner
- 2007 : Christophe Laurent (FRA), Crédit Agricole
- 2008 : Scott Nydam (USA), BMC Racing Team
- 2009 : Jason McCartney (USA), Team Saxo Bank
- 2010 : Thomas Rabou (NED), Team Type 1
- 2011 : Pat McCarty (USA), SpiderTech–C10
- 2012 : Sebastian Salas (CAN), Optum–Kelly Benefit Strategies
- 2013 : Carter Jones (USA), Bissell
- 2014 : Will Routley (CAN), Optum–Kelly Benefit Strategies
- 2015 : Daniel Oss (ITA), BMC Racing Team
- 2016 : Evan Huffman (USA), Rally Cycling
- 2017 : Daniel Jaramillo (COL), UnitedHealthcare
- 2018 : Toms Skujiņš (LAT), Trek–Segafredo
- 2019 : Davide Ballerini (ITA), Astana

==== Most Days in Mountains Jersey ====
- Carter Jones (USA), 8 days (2013)
- Will Routley (CAN), 8 days (2014)
- Evan Huffman (USA), 7 days (2016)
- Francisco Mancebo (ESP), 6 days (2009)
- Sebastian Salas (CAN), 6 days (2012)
- Daniel Jaramillo (COL), 6 days (2017)
- Toms Skujiņš (LAT), 6 days (2018; 2, 2015; 4)
- Bernhard Kohl (AUT), 5 days (2006)
- Scott Nydam (USA), 5 days (2008)
- Thomas Rabou (NED), 5 days (2010)
- Pat McCarty (USA), 5 days (2011)
- Egan Bernal (COL), 4 days (2018)
- Christophe Laurent (FRA), 4 days (2007)
- Davide Ballerini (ITA), 4 days (2019)
- Levi Leipheimer (USA), 3 days (2006)
- Tom Peterson (USA), 3 days (2007)

=== Best Young Rider Classification ===
The leader and overall winner by time for riders under 23 is awarded the White Jersey. Before 2009, this jersey was silver and blue.

==== Best Young Rider Winners ====
- 2006 : Tom Peterson (USA), TIAA–CREF
- 2007 : Robert Gesink (NED), Rabobank
- 2008 : Robert Gesink (NED), Rabobank
- 2009 : Robert Gesink (NED), Rabobank
- 2010 : Peter Sagan (SVK), Liquigas–Doimo
- 2011 : Tejay van Garderen (USA), HTC–Highroad
- 2012 : Wilco Kelderman (NED), Rabobank
- 2013 : Lawson Craddock (USA), Bontrager Cycling Team
- 2014 : Lawson Craddock (USA), Giant–Shimano
- 2015 : Julian Alaphilippe (FRA), Etixx–Quick-Step
- 2016 : Neilson Powless (USA), Axeon–Hagens Berman
- 2017 : Lachlan Morton (AUS), Team Dimension Data
- 2018 : Egan Bernal (COL), Team Sky
- 2019 : Tadej Pogačar (SLO), UAE Team Emirates

==== Most Days in Youth Jersey ====
- Robert Gesink (NED), 16 days (2009: 8; 2008: 5; 2007: 3)
- Lawson Craddock (USA), 14 days (2014: 7; 2013: 7)
- Peter Sagan (SVK), 13 days (2012: 4; 2011: 2; 2010: 7)
- Egan Bernal (COL), 7 days (2018)
- Tom Peterson (USA), 6 days (2006)
- Julian Alaphilippe (FRA), 6 days (2015)
- Neilson Powless (USA), 6 days (2016)
- Tadej Pogačar (SLO), 6 days (2019)
- Lachlan Morton (AUS), 5 days (2017)
- Tejay van Garderen (USA), 4 days (2011)
- Taylor Tolleson (USA), 3 days (2007)

=== Teams Classification ===
Teams are classified based on the total time of the team's top three finishers in each stage.

==== Best Team Winners ====
- 2006 : (Denmark) Team CSC
- 2007 : (Denmark) Team CSC
- 2008 : (United States) Slipstream–Chipotle
- 2009 : (Kazakhstan) Astana
- 2010 : (United States) Garmin–Transitions
- 2011 : (United States) Garmin–Cervélo
- 2012 : (Luxembourg) RadioShack–Nissan
- 2013 : (United States) BMC Racing Team
- 2014 : (United States) Garmin–Sharp
- 2015 : (United Kingdom) Team Sky
- 2016 : (United States) BMC Racing Team
- 2017 : (United Kingdom) Team Sky
- 2018 : (United Kingdom) Team Sky
- 2019 : (United States) EF Education First

=== Most Courageous Rider Classification ===
The Blue Jersey is given to the most courageous rider at the end of each stage. In 2008, the jersey was red. George Hincapie has won this jersey three times, after stages in 2008, 2009 and 2010. Jan Bárta won the award twice during the 2011 edition. Ben Wolfe and Evan Huffman both won the jersey twice during the 2017 race. No one else has won this jersey more than once.

== Doping controversy ==
The main sponsor of the event, Amgen, is the producer of the medical drug Erythropoietin, also called EPO. EPO has been used as a performance-enhancing drug by professional cyclists. Former professional cyclists who admitted their doping, such as Tyler Hamilton, claim that for some time most of the world's top cyclists used EPO.

A plan to perform comprehensive anti-doping tests for the 2011 event was terminated by the UCI. The plan was to do blood tests performed by the United States Anti-Doping Agency (USADA), which would have been able to detect EPO, but the UCI and the USADA couldn't agree on the details of the doping tests. For the 2013 edition, the UCI elected to reintroduce testing based on the biological passport, as USADA would also take care of pre-race testing, but with no cooperation between the two agencies.
