= 2016 Tour of California =

2016 UCI America Tour

Race details
- Dates: May 15–22, 2016
- Stages: 8
- Distance: 779 mi (1,254 km)
- Winning time: 31h 47' 50"

Results
Jersey awarded to the overall winner	Winner	Julian Alaphilippe (FRA)	(Etixx–Quick-Step)
	Second	Rohan Dennis (AUS)	(BMC Racing Team)
	Third	Brent Bookwalter (USA)	(BMC Racing Team)
Jersey awarded to the mountains classification winner	Mountains	Evan Huffman (USA)	(Rally Cycling)
Jersey awarded to the youth classification winner	Youth	Neilson Powless (USA)	(Axeon–Hagens Berman)
Jersey awarded to the sprints classification winner	Sprints	Peter Sagan (SVK)	(Tinkoff)
	Team	BMC Racing Team	

The 2016 Amgen Tour of California was the eleventh edition of the Tour of California cycling stage race. It was held from May 15–22, and rated as a 2.HC event on the UCI America Tour. It began in San Diego and finished in Sacramento.

== Schedule ==
List of stages
Stage	Date	Course	Distance	Type	Winner
1	May 15	San Diego	108.7 mi (174.9 km)	Hilly stage	Peter Sagan (SVK)
2	May 16	South Pasadena to Santa Clarita	92.3 mi (148.5 km)	Medium-mountain stage	Ben King (USA)
3	May 17	Thousand Oaks to Santa Barbara County (Gibraltar Road)	104.1 mi (167.5 km)	Mountain stage	Julian Alaphilippe (FRA)
4	May 18	Morro Bay to Monterey County (Laguna Seca)	134.8 mi (216.9 km)	Hilly stage	Peter Sagan (SVK)
5	May 19	Lodi to South Lake Tahoe	131.7 mi (212.0 km)	Mountain stage	Toms Skujiņš (LAT)
6	May 20	Folsom	12.6 mi (20.3 km)	Individual time trial	Rohan Dennis (AUS)
7	May 21	Santa Rosa	109.1 mi (175.6 km)	Hilly stage	Alexander Kristoff (NOR)
8	May 22	Sacramento	85.7 mi (137.9 km)	Flat stage	Mark Cavendish (GBR)
	Total		779 mi (1,254 km)		

== Teams ==
18 teams were selected to take part in the race. 10 UCI WorldTeams were invited, along with 3 Professional Continental teams and 5 Continental teams.

World Tour Teams

- BMC Racing Team
- Team Dimension Data
- Etixx–Quick-Step
- Team Giant–Alpecin
- Team Katusha
- LottoNL–Jumbo
- Team Sky
- Tinkoff
- Trek–Segafredo
- Cannondale

Professional Continental teams

- Direct Énergie
- Team Novo Nordisk
- UnitedHealthcare

Continental teams

- Axeon–Hagens Berman
- Holowesko Citadel Racing Team
- Jelly Belly–Maxxis
- Rally Cycling
- WIGGINS

== Stages ==
=== Stage 1 ===
15 May 2016 — San Diego to San Diego, 175 km (108.7 mi)

Result of Stage 1
Rank	Rider	Team	Time
1	Peter Sagan (SVK)	Tinkoff	4h 20' 41"
2	Wouter Wippert (NED)	Cannondale	s.t.
3	Dylan Groenewegen (NED)	LottoNL–Jumbo	s.t.
4	Bryan Coquard (FRA)	Direct Énergie	s.t.
5	Martijn Verschoor (NED)	Team Novo Nordisk	s.t.
6	Niccolo Bonifazio (ITA)	Trek–Segafredo	s.t.
7	Ruben Guerreiro (POR)	Axeon–Hagens Berman	s.t.
8	Tom Boonen (BEL)	Etixx–Quick-Step	s.t.
9	Jempy Drucker (LUX)	BMC Racing Team	s.t.
10	John Murphy (USA)	UnitedHealthcare	s.t.

General classification after Stage 1
Rank	Rider	Team	Time
1	Peter Sagan (SVK)	Tinkoff	4h 20' 31"
2	Wouter Wippert (NED)	Cannondale	+ 4"
3	Michael Sheehan (USA)	Jelly Belly–Maxxis	+ 4"
4	Dylan Groenewegen (NED)	LottoNL–Jumbo	+ 6"
5	Daniel Eaton (USA)	UnitedHealthcare	+ 7"
6	Joonas Henttala (FIN)	Team Novo Nordisk	+ 8"
7	Bryan Coquard (FRA)	Direct Énergie	+ 10"
8	Martijn Verschoor (NED)	Team Novo Nordisk	+ 10"
9	Niccolo Bonifazio (ITA)	Trek–Segafredo	+ 10"
10	Ruben Guerreiro (POR)	Axeon–Hagens Berman	+ 10"

=== Stage 2 ===
16 May 2016 — South Pasadena to Santa Clarita, 148.5 km (92.3 mi)

Result of Stage 2
Rank	Rider	Team	Time
1	Ben King (USA)	Cannondale	3h 52' 09"
2	Evan Huffman (USA)	Rally Cycling	s.t.
3	Alexander Kristoff (NOR)	Team Katusha	+ 8"
4	Peter Sagan (SVK)	Tinkoff	+ 8"
5	Niccolo Bonifazio (ITA)	Trek–Segafredo	+ 8"
6	Danny van Poppel (NED)	Team Sky	+ 8"
7	Patrick Bevin (NZL)	Cannondale	+ 8"
8	Nathan Haas (AUS)	Team Dimension Data	+ 8"
9	Bryan Coquard (FRA)	Direct Énergie	+ 8"
10	Marco Canola (ITA)	UnitedHealthcare	+ 8"

General classification after Stage 2
Rank	Rider	Team	Time
1	Ben King (USA)	Cannondale	8h 12' 34"
2	Evan Huffman (USA)	Rally Cycling	+ 8"
3	Peter Sagan (SVK)	Tinkoff	+ 14"
4	Alexander Kristoff (NOR)	Team Katusha	+ 20"
5	Daniel Eaton (USA)	UnitedHealthcare	+ 21"
6	William Barta (USA)	Axeon–Hagens Berman	+ 21"
7	Sindre Skjøstad Lunke (NOR)	Team Giant–Alpecin	+ 23"
8	Niccolo Bonifazio (ITA)	Trek–Segafredo	+ 24"
9	Bryan Coquard (FRA)	Direct Énergie	+ 24"
10	Danny van Poppel (NED)	Team Sky	+ 24"

=== Stage 3 ===
17 May 2016 — Thousand Oaks to Santa Barbara County (Gibraltar Road), 167.5 km (104.1 mi)

Result of Stage 3
Rank	Rider	Team	Time
1	Julian Alaphilippe (FRA)	Etixx–Quick-Step	4h 36' 59"
2	Peter Stetina (USA)	Trek–Segafredo	+ 15"
3	George Bennett (NZL)	LottoNL–Jumbo	+ 25"
4	Brent Bookwalter (USA)	BMC Racing Team	+ 27"
5	Neilson Powless (USA)	Axeon–Hagens Berman	+ 30"
6	Laurens ten Dam (NED)	Team Giant–Alpecin	+ 33"
7	Lachlan Morton (AUS)	Jelly Belly–Maxxis	+ 35"
8	Rohan Dennis (AUS)	BMC Racing Team	+ 48"
9	Samuel Sánchez (ESP)	BMC Racing Team	+ 48"
10	Andrew Talansky (USA)	Cannondale	+ 59"

General classification after Stage 3
Rank	Rider	Team	Time
1	Julian Alaphilippe (FRA)	Etixx–Quick-Step	12h 49' 47"
2	Peter Stetina (USA)	Trek–Segafredo	+ 19"
3	George Bennett (NZL)	LottoNL–Jumbo	+ 31"
4	Brent Bookwalter (USA)	BMC Racing Team	+ 37"
5	Neilson Powless (USA)	Axeon–Hagens Berman	+ 40"
6	Laurens ten Dam (NED)	Team Giant–Alpecin	+ 43"
7	Lachlan Morton (AUS)	Jelly Belly–Maxxis	+ 45"
8	Rohan Dennis (AUS)	BMC Racing Team	+ 58"
9	Samuel Sánchez (ESP)	BMC Racing Team	+ 58"
10	Haimar Zubeldia (ESP)	Trek–Segafredo	+ 1' 09"

=== Stage 4 ===
18 May 2016 — Morro Bay to Monterey County (Laguna Seca), 216.9 km (134.8 mi)

Result of Stage 4
Rank	Rider	Team	Time
1	Peter Sagan (SVK)	Tinkoff	5h 16' 33"
2	Greg Van Avermaet (BEL)	BMC Racing Team	s.t.
3	Nathan Haas (AUS)	Team Dimension Data	s.t.
4	Brent Bookwalter (USA)	BMC Racing Team	s.t.
5	Tao Geoghegan Hart (GBR)	Axeon–Hagens Berman	s.t.
6	Neilson Powless (USA)	Axeon–Hagens Berman	s.t.
7	Rohan Dennis (AUS)	BMC Racing Team	s.t.
8	Jurgen Van den Broeck (BEL)	Team Katusha	s.t.
9	Rob Britton (CAN)	Rally Cycling	s.t.
10	Julian Alaphilippe (FRA)	Etixx–Quick-Step	s.t.

General classification after Stage 4
Rank	Rider	Team	Time
1	Julian Alaphilippe (FRA)	Etixx–Quick-Step	18h 06' 17"
2	Peter Stetina (USA)	Trek–Segafredo	+ 22"
3	George Bennett (NZL)	LottoNL–Jumbo	+ 37"
4	Brent Bookwalter (USA)	BMC Racing Team	+ 40"
5	Neilson Powless (USA)	Axeon–Hagens Berman	+ 43"
6	Laurens ten Dam (NED)	Team Giant–Alpecin	+ 49"
7	Rohan Dennis (AUS)	BMC Racing Team	+ 1' 01"
8	Samuel Sánchez (ESP)	BMC Racing Team	+ 1' 01"
9	Rob Britton (CAN)	Rally Cycling	+ 1' 12"
10	Haimar Zubeldia (ESP)	Trek–Segafredo	+ 1' 15"

=== Stage 5 ===
19 May 2016 — Lodi to South Lake Tahoe, 212 km (131.7 mi)

Result of Stage 5
Rank	Rider	Team	Time
1	Toms Skujiņš (LAT)	Cannondale	5h 54' 45"
2	Adam de Vos (CAN)	Rally Cycling	s.t.
3	Xabier Zandio (ESP)	Team Sky	+ 8"
4	Jasper Stuyven (BEL)	Trek–Segafredo	+ 28"
5	Jhonatan Restrepo (COL)	Team Katusha	+ 43"
6	Rob Squire (USA)	Holowesko Citadel Racing Team	+ 43"
7	Julian Alaphilippe (FRA)	Etixx–Quick-Step	+ 43"
8	Travis McCabe (USA)	Holowesko Citadel Racing Team	+ 43"
9	Rohan Dennis (AUS)	BMC Racing Team	+ 43"
10	Lawson Craddock (USA)	Cannondale	+ 43"

General classification after Stage 5
Rank	Rider	Team	Time
1	Julian Alaphilippe (FRA)	Etixx–Quick-Step	24h 01' 45"
2	Peter Stetina (USA)	Trek–Segafredo	+ 22"
3	George Bennett (NZL)	LottoNL–Jumbo	+ 37"
4	Brent Bookwalter (USA)	BMC Racing Team	+ 40"
5	Laurens ten Dam (NED)	Team Giant–Alpecin	+ 49"
6	Neilson Powless (USA)	Axeon–Hagens Berman	+ 1' 01"
7	Rohan Dennis (AUS)	BMC Racing Team	+ 1' 01"
8	Samuel Sánchez (ESP)	BMC Racing Team	+ 1' 01"
9	Rob Britton (CAN)	Rally Cycling	+ 1' 12"
10	Haimar Zubeldia (ESP)	Trek–Segafredo	+ 1' 15"

=== Stage 6 ===
20 May 2016 — Folsom, 20.3 km (12.6 mi) Individual time trial

Result of Stage 6
Rank	Rider	Team	Time
1	Rohan Dennis (AUS)	BMC Racing Team	24' 16"
2	Andrew Talansky (USA)	Cannondale	+ 17"
3	Taylor Phinney (USA)	BMC Racing Team	+ 20"
4	Søren Kragh Andersen (DEN)	Team Giant–Alpecin	+ 33"
5	Brent Bookwalter (USA)	BMC Racing Team	+ 43"
6	Vasil Kiryienka (BLR)	Team Sky	+ 44"
7	Lawson Craddock (USA)	Cannondale	+ 44"
8	Julian Alaphilippe (FRA)	Etixx–Quick-Step	+ 45"
9	Jurgen Van den Broeck (BEL)	Team Katusha	+ 49"
10	Neilson Powless (USA)	Axeon–Hagens Berman	+ 52"

General classification after Stage 6
Rank	Rider	Team	Time
1	Julian Alaphilippe (FRA)	Etixx–Quick-Step	24h 26' 46"
2	Rohan Dennis (AUS)	BMC Racing Team	+ 16"
3	Brent Bookwalter (USA)	BMC Racing Team	+ 38"
4	Andrew Talansky (USA)	Cannondale	+ 47"
5	Neilson Powless (USA)	Axeon–Hagens Berman	+ 1' 08"
6	Lawson Craddock (USA)	Cannondale	+ 1' 17"
7	Samuel Sánchez (ESP)	BMC Racing Team	+ 1' 17"
8	Laurens ten Dam (NED)	Team Giant–Alpecin	+ 1' 24"
9	George Bennett (NZL)	LottoNL–Jumbo	+ 1' 45"
10	Jurgen Van den Broeck (BEL)	Team Katusha	+ 1' 48"

=== Stage 7 ===
21 May 2016 — Santa Rosa to Santa Rosa, 175 km (108.7 mi)

Result of Stage 7
Rank	Rider	Team	Time
1	Alexander Kristoff (NOR)	Team Katusha	4h 19' 52"
2	Peter Sagan (SVK)	Tinkoff	s.t.
3	Danny van Poppel (NED)	Team Sky	s.t.
4	Mike Teunissen (NED)	LottoNL–Jumbo	s.t.
5	Bryan Coquard (FRA)	Direct Énergie	s.t.
6	Jasper Stuyven (BEL)	Trek–Segafredo	s.t.
7	Travis McCabe (USA)	Holowesko Citadel Racing Team	s.t.
8	John Degenkolb (GER)	Team Giant–Alpecin	s.t.
9	Timo Roosen (NED)	LottoNL–Jumbo	s.t.
10	Ruben Guerreiro (POR)	Axeon–Hagens Berman	s.t.

General classification after Stage 7
Rank	Rider	Team	Time
1	Julian Alaphilippe (FRA)	Etixx–Quick-Step	28h 46' 38"
2	Rohan Dennis (AUS)	BMC Racing Team	+ 16"
3	Brent Bookwalter (USA)	BMC Racing Team	+ 38"
4	Andrew Talansky (USA)	Cannondale	+ 47"
5	Neilson Powless (USA)	Axeon–Hagens Berman	+ 1' 08"
6	Lawson Craddock (USA)	Cannondale	+ 1' 17"
7	Samuel Sánchez (ESP)	BMC Racing Team	+ 1' 17"
8	Laurens ten Dam (NED)	Team Giant–Alpecin	+ 1' 24"
9	George Bennett (NZL)	LottoNL–Jumbo	+ 1' 45"
10	Jurgen Van den Broeck (BEL)	Team Katusha	+ 1' 48"

=== Stage 8 ===
22 May 2016 — Sacramento to Sacramento, 85 km (52.8 mi)

Result of Stage 8
Rank	Rider	Team	Time
1	Mark Cavendish (GBR)	Team Dimension Data	3h 1' 12"
2	Peter Sagan (SVK)	Tinkoff	s.t.
3	Alexander Kristoff (NOR)	Team Katusha	s.t.
4	Danny van Poppel (NED)	Team Sky	s.t.
5	John Degenkolb (GER)	Team Giant–Alpecin	s.t.
6	Niccolo Bonifazio (ITA)	Trek–Segafredo	s.t.
7	Jean-Pierre Drucker (LUX)	BMC Racing Team	s.t.
8	Maximiliano Richeze (ARG)	Etixx–Quick-Step	s.t.
9	Dylan Groenewegen (NED)	LottoNL–Jumbo	s.t.
10	Travis McCabe (USA)	Holowesko Citadel Racing Team	s.t.

General classification after Stage 8
Rank	Rider	Team	Time
1	Julian Alaphilippe (FRA)	Etixx–Quick-Step	28h 46' 38"
2	Rohan Dennis (AUS)	BMC Racing Team	+ 21"
3	Brent Bookwalter (USA)	BMC Racing Team	+ 43"
4	Andrew Talansky (USA)	Cannondale	+ 52"
6	Lawson Craddock (USA)	Cannondale	+ 1' 22"
7	Samuel Sánchez (ESP)	BMC Racing Team	+ 1' 22"
9	George Bennett (NZL)	LottoNL–Jumbo	+ 1' 50"
10	Jurgen Van den Broeck (BEL)	Team Katusha	+ 1' 53"
5	Neilson Powless (USA)	Axeon–Hagens Berman	+ 1' 57"
8	Laurens ten Dam (NED)	Team Giant–Alpecin	+ 2' 13"

== Classification leadership ==
In the 2016 Tour of California, 5 jerseys were awarded. For the general classification, calculated by adding the finishing times of the stages per cyclist, the leader received a yellow jersey (Amgen Race Leader Jersey). Time bonuses were awarded for the first three finishers on mass-start stages (10, 6 and 4 seconds respectively) and on intermediate sprints (3, 2 and 1 seconds respectively). This classification was considered the most important of the Tour of California, and the winner of the general classification was considered the winner of the Tour of California.

Additionally, there was also a sprints classification, akin to what is called the points classification in other races, which awards a green jersey (Visit California Sprint Jersey). In the sprints classification, cyclists received points for finishing in the top 15 in a stage. In addition, some points could be won in intermediate sprints as well as bonus seconds in the overall classification. The first across the line got 3 seconds, the second two and the third rider, one.

There was also a mountains classification, which awarded a Polka dots jersey (Lexus King of the Mountain Jersey). In the mountains classifications, points were won by reaching the top of a mountain before other cyclists. Each climb was categorized, either first, second, third, or fourth category, with more points available for the harder climbs.

There was also a youth classification. This classification was calculated the same way as the general classification, but only young cyclists (under 23) were included. The leader of the young rider classification received a white and green jersey (SRAM Best Young Rider Jersey).

The last jersey was awarded to the most combative rider of a stage for him to wear on the next stage. It was generally awarded to a rider who attacks constantly or spent a lot of time in the breakaways. This jersey was blue, white and yellow (Amgen Breakaway from Cancer© Most Courageous Rider Jersey).

There was also a classification for teams. In this classification, the times of the best three cyclists per stage were added, and the team with the lowest time was the leader.

Stage	Winner	General classification	Youth classification	Mountains classification	Sprint classification	Most courageous	Team classification
1	Peter Sagan	Peter Sagan	Dylan Groenewegen	Oscar Clark	Peter Sagan	Jacob Rathe	UnitedHealthcare
2	Ben King	Ben King	Daniel Eaton	Evan Huffman	Peter Sagan	Will Barta	Cannondale
3	Julian Alaphilippe	Julian Alaphilippe	Neilson Powless	Evan Huffman	Peter Sagan	Gregory Daniel	BMC Racing Team
4	Peter Sagan	Julian Alaphilippe	Neilson Powless	Evan Huffman	Peter Sagan	Mark Cavendish	BMC Racing Team
5	Toms Skujiņš	Julian Alaphilippe	Neilson Powless	Evan Huffman	Peter Sagan	Toms Skujiņš	BMC Racing Team
6	Rohan Dennis	Julian Alaphilippe	Neilson Powless	Evan Huffman	Peter Sagan	not awarded	BMC Racing Team
7	Alexander Kristoff	Julian Alaphilippe	Neilson Powless	Evan Huffman	Peter Sagan	Peter Sagan	BMC Racing Team
8	Mark Cavendish	Julian Alaphilippe	Neilson Powless	Evan Huffman	Peter Sagan	Toms Skujiņš	BMC Racing Team
Final		Julian Alaphilippe	Neilson Powless	Evan Huffman	Peter Sagan	not awarded	BMC Racing Team

Notes

- In stage 2, Wouter Wippert, who was second in the sprint classification, wore the green jersey, because Peter Sagan (in first place) wore the yellow jersey as leader of the general classification during that stage.
