= 2017 Tour of California =

Cycling race

2017 UCI World Tour, race 22 of 37

Race details
- Dates: 14–20 May 2017
- Stages: 7
- Distance: 938 km (582.8 mi)
- Winning time: 22h 54' 38"

Results
Jersey awarded to the overall winner	Winner	George Bennett (NZL)	(LottoNL–Jumbo)
	Second	Rafał Majka (POL)	(Bora–Hansgrohe)
	Third	Andrew Talansky (USA)	(Cannondale–Drapac)
Jersey awarded to the mountains classification winner	Mountains	Daniel Jaramillo (COL)	(UnitedHealthcare)
Jersey awarded to the youth classification winner	Youth	Lachlan Morton (AUS)	(Team Dimension Data)
Jersey awarded to the sprints classification winner	Sprints	Peter Sagan (SVK)	(Bora–Hansgrohe)
	Team	Team Sky	

The 2017 Amgen Tour of California was a road cycling stage race that took place between 14 and 20 May. It was the 12th edition of the Tour of California and the 22nd event of the 2017 UCI World Tour; the first time that the race has been staged as part of the World Tour.

New Zealand's George Bennett (LottoNL–Jumbo) took the first victory of his professional career, winning the general classification by 35 seconds ahead of Polish rider Rafał Majka, riding for the Bora–Hansgrohe team. Majka had held the race lead after winning the second stage ahead of Bennett, but Bennett's superior performance during the penultimate day time trial at Big Bear Lake allowed him to take the race lead, and ultimately the race win. Bennett's win was the first overall win by a rider from New Zealand at UCI World Tour level. The podium was completed by the top home rider, Cannondale–Drapac member Andrew Talansky, a second in arrears of Majka.

In the other classifications, Majka's teammate Peter Sagan won the sprints classification, and its accompanying green jersey, for the seventh time in eight years; Colombian rider Daniel Jaramillo (UnitedHealthcare) edged out Rally Cycling's Evan Huffman on a countback to win the polka-dot jersey for the mountains classification, while a final-day attack by Australian Lachlan Morton (Team Dimension Data) allowed him to regain the white jersey of young rider classification leader that he had lost the previous day to Team Sky's Tao Geoghegan Hart. The teams classification was won by Team Sky, after placing both Ian Boswell and Geoghegan Hart in the top-ten overall. Huffman won the most stages during the race with two, the first time that a UCI Continental team had won on the UCI World Tour.

== Teams ==
As a new event to the UCI World Tour, all UCI WorldTeams were invited to the race, but not obligated to compete in the race. Almost all the competing teams were announced on 9 March 2017, with UAE Team Emirates added to the field in the week leading up to the race.

As such, twelve of the eighteen WorldTeams competed in the race. Three UCI Professional Continental teams competed, while two UCI Continental teams were also granted permission to compete in the race. Therefore, this completed the 17-team peloton.

UCI WorldTeams

- Astana
- BMC Racing Team
- Bora–Hansgrohe
- Cannondale–Drapac
- Team Dimension Data
- Team Katusha–Alpecin
- LottoNL–Jumbo
- Quick-Step Floors
- Team Sky
- Team Sunweb
- Trek–Segafredo
- UAE Team Emirates

UCI Professional Continental teams

- Cofidis
- Team Novo Nordisk
- UnitedHealthcare

UCI Continental teams

- Jelly Belly–Maxxis
- Rally Cycling

== Route ==
For the 2017 edition, the race was shortened from eight stages to seven stages. The full race route was announced on 31 January 2017.

Stage schedule
Stage	Date	Route	Distance	Type	Winner
1	14 May	Sacramento to Sacramento	167 km (103.8 mi)	Flat stage	Marcel Kittel (GER)
2	15 May	Modesto to San Jose	144.5 km (89.8 mi)	Medium-mountain stage	Rafał Majka (POL)
3	16 May	Pismo Beach to Morro Bay	192.5 km (119.6 mi)	Flat stage	Peter Sagan (SVK)
4	17 May	Santa Barbara to Santa Clarita	159.5 km (99.1 mi)	Flat stage	Evan Huffman (USA)
5	18 May	Ontario to Mount Baldy	125.5 km (78.0 mi)	Mountain stage	Andrew Talansky (USA)
6	19 May	Big Bear Lake to Big Bear Lake	24 km (14.9 mi)	Individual time trial	Jonathan Dibben (GBR)
7	20 May	Mountain High to Pasadena	125 km (77.7 mi)	Medium-mountain stage	Evan Huffman (USA)

== Stages ==
=== Stage 1 ===
14 May 2017 — Sacramento to Sacramento, 167 km (103.8 mi)

Stage 1 result
Rank	Rider	Team	Time
1	Marcel Kittel (GER)	Quick-Step Floors	3h 45' 35"
2	Peter Sagan (SVK)	Bora–Hansgrohe	+ 0"
3	Elia Viviani (ITA)	Team Sky	+ 0"
4	John Degenkolb (GER)	Trek–Segafredo	+ 0"
5	Jempy Drucker (LUX)	BMC Racing Team	+ 0"
6	Reinardt Janse van Rensburg (RSA)	Team Dimension Data	+ 0"
7	Jonas van Genechten (BEL)	Cofidis	+ 0"
8	Marko Kump (SLO)	UAE Team Emirates	+ 0"
9	Wouter Wippert (NED)	Cannondale–Drapac	+ 0"
10	Travis McCabe (USA)	UnitedHealthcare	+ 0"

General classification after Stage 1
Rank	Rider	Team	Time
1	Marcel Kittel (GER)	Quick-Step Floors	3h 45' 25"
2	Peter Sagan (SVK)	Bora–Hansgrohe	+ 4"
3	Elia Viviani (ITA)	Team Sky	+ 6"
4	Floris Gerts (NED)	BMC Racing Team	+ 9"
5	Jonathan Clarke (AUS)	UnitedHealthcare	+ 9"
6	John Degenkolb (GER)	Trek–Segafredo	+ 10"
7	Jempy Drucker (LUX)	BMC Racing Team	+ 10"
8	Reinardt Janse van Rensburg (RSA)	Team Dimension Data	+ 10"
9	Jonas van Genechten (BEL)	Cofidis	+ 10"
10	Marko Kump (SLO)	UAE Team Emirates	+ 10"

=== Stage 2 ===
15 May 2017 — Modesto to San Jose, 144.5 km (89.8 mi)

Stage 2 result
Rank	Rider	Team	Time
1	Rafał Majka (POL)	Bora–Hansgrohe	3h 43' 46"
2	George Bennett (NZL)	LottoNL–Jumbo	+ 0"
3	Ian Boswell (USA)	Team Sky	+ 7"
4	Lachlan Morton (AUS)	Team Dimension Data	+ 7"
5	Robert Gesink (NED)	LottoNL–Jumbo	+ 37"
6	Brent Bookwalter (USA)	BMC Racing Team	+ 37"
7	Tao Geoghegan Hart (GBR)	Team Sky	+ 37"
8	Sam Oomen (NED)	Team Sunweb	+ 37"
9	Enric Mas (ESP)	Quick-Step Floors	+ 37"
10	Andrew Talansky (USA)	Cannondale–Drapac	+ 37"

General classification after Stage 2
Rank	Rider	Team	Time
1	Rafał Majka (POL)	Bora–Hansgrohe	7h 29' 14"
2	George Bennett (NZL)	LottoNL–Jumbo	+ 2"
3	Ian Boswell (USA)	Team Sky	+ 14"
4	Lachlan Morton (AUS)	Team Dimension Data	+ 16"
5	Robert Gesink (NED)	LottoNL–Jumbo	+ 48"
6	Brent Bookwalter (USA)	BMC Racing Team	+ 48"
7	Sam Oomen (NED)	Team Sunweb	+ 48"
8	Andrew Talansky (USA)	Cannondale–Drapac	+ 48"
9	Maximilian Schachmann (GER)	Quick-Step Floors	+ 48"
10	Vegard Stake Laengen (NOR)	UAE Team Emirates	+ 48"

=== Stage 3 ===
16 May 2017 — Pismo Beach to Morro Bay, 192.5 km (119.6 mi)

Stage 3 result
Rank	Rider	Team	Time
1	Peter Sagan (SVK)	Bora–Hansgrohe	4h 53' 26"
2	Rick Zabel (GER)	Team Katusha–Alpecin	+ 0"
3	Simone Consonni (ITA)	UAE Team Emirates	+ 0"
4	Alexander Kristoff (NOR)	Team Katusha–Alpecin	+ 0"
5	Jempy Drucker (LUX)	BMC Racing Team	+ 0"
6	Reinardt Janse van Rensburg (RSA)	Team Dimension Data	+ 0"
7	Taylor Phinney (USA)	Cannondale–Drapac	+ 0"
8	Ramon Sinkeldam (NED)	Team Sunweb	+ 0"
9	Travis McCabe (USA)	UnitedHealthcare	+ 0"
10	Mike Teunissen (NED)	Team Sunweb	+ 0"

General classification after Stage 3
Rank	Rider	Team	Time
1	Rafał Majka (POL)	Bora–Hansgrohe	12h 22' 43"
2	George Bennett (NZL)	LottoNL–Jumbo	+ 2"
3	Ian Boswell (USA)	Team Sky	+ 14"
4	Lachlan Morton (AUS)	Team Dimension Data	+ 16"
5	Robert Gesink (NED)	LottoNL–Jumbo	+ 45"
6	Brent Bookwalter (USA)	BMC Racing Team	+ 48"
7	Sam Oomen (NED)	Team Sunweb	+ 48"
8	Andrew Talansky (USA)	Cannondale–Drapac	+ 48"
9	Vegard Stake Laengen (NOR)	UAE Team Emirates	+ 48"
10	Maximilian Schachmann (GER)	Quick-Step Floors	+ 48"

=== Stage 4 ===
17 May 2017 — Santa Barbara to Santa Clarita, 159.5 km (99.1 mi)

Stage 4 result
Rank	Rider	Team	Time
1	Evan Huffman (USA)	Rally Cycling	3h 41' 52"
2	Rob Britton (CAN)	Rally Cycling	+ 0"
3	Lennard Hofstede (NED)	Team Sunweb	+ 0"
4	Mathias Le Turnier (FRA)	Cofidis	+ 0"
5	Gavin Mannion (USA)	UnitedHealthcare	+ 0"
6	Peter Sagan (SVK)	Bora–Hansgrohe	+ 13"
7	John Degenkolb (GER)	Trek–Segafredo	+ 13"
8	Marcel Kittel (GER)	Quick-Step Floors	+ 13"
9	Alexander Kristoff (NOR)	Team Katusha–Alpecin	+ 13"
10	Simone Consonni (ITA)	UAE Team Emirates	+ 13"

General classification after Stage 4
Rank	Rider	Team	Time
1	Rafał Majka (POL)	Bora–Hansgrohe	16h 04' 48"
2	George Bennett (NZL)	LottoNL–Jumbo	+ 2"
3	Ian Boswell (USA)	Team Sky	+ 14"
4	Lachlan Morton (AUS)	Team Dimension Data	+ 16"
5	Robert Gesink (NED)	LottoNL–Jumbo	+ 45"
6	Brent Bookwalter (USA)	BMC Racing Team	+ 48"
7	Sam Oomen (NED)	Team Sunweb	+ 48"
8	Andrew Talansky (USA)	Cannondale–Drapac	+ 48"
9	Vegard Stake Laengen (NOR)	UAE Team Emirates	+ 48"
10	Maximilian Schachmann (GER)	Quick-Step Floors	+ 48"

=== Stage 5 ===
18 May 2017 — Ontario to Mount Baldy, 125.5 km (78.0 mi)

Stage 5 result
Rank	Rider	Team	Time
1	Andrew Talansky (USA)	Cannondale–Drapac	3h 43' 15"
2	Rafał Majka (POL)	Bora–Hansgrohe	+ 0"
3	George Bennett (NZL)	LottoNL–Jumbo	+ 2"
4	Ian Boswell (USA)	Team Sky	+ 5"
5	Brent Bookwalter (USA)	BMC Racing Team	+ 8"
6	Sam Oomen (NED)	Team Sunweb	+ 20"
7	Lachlan Morton (AUS)	Team Dimension Data	+ 27"
8	Tao Geoghegan Hart (GBR)	Team Sky	+ 40"
9	Robert Gesink (NED)	LottoNL–Jumbo	+ 40"
10	Sepp Kuss (USA)	Rally Cycling	+ 56"

General classification after Stage 5
Rank	Rider	Team	Time
1	Rafał Majka (POL)	Bora–Hansgrohe	19h 47' 57"
2	George Bennett (NZL)	LottoNL–Jumbo	+ 6"
3	Ian Boswell (USA)	Team Sky	+ 25"
4	Andrew Talansky (USA)	Cannondale–Drapac	+ 44"
5	Lachlan Morton (AUS)	Team Dimension Data	+ 49"
6	Brent Bookwalter (USA)	BMC Racing Team	+ 1' 02"
7	Sam Oomen (NED)	Team Sunweb	+ 1' 14"
8	Robert Gesink (NED)	LottoNL–Jumbo	+ 1' 31"
9	Tao Geoghegan Hart (GBR)	Team Sky	+ 1' 34"
10	Vegard Stake Laengen (NOR)	UAE Team Emirates	+ 1' 50"

=== Stage 6 ===
19 May 2017 — Big Bear Lake to Big Bear Lake, 24 km (14.9 mi), individual time trial (ITT)

Stage 6 result
Rank	Rider	Team	Time
1	Jonathan Dibben (GBR)	Team Sky	28' 27"
2	Brent Bookwalter (USA)	BMC Racing Team	+ 7"
3	Andrew Talansky (USA)	Cannondale–Drapac	+ 16"
4	George Bennett (NZL)	LottoNL–Jumbo	+ 18"
5	Filippo Ganna (ITA)	UAE Team Emirates	+ 21"
6	Maximilian Schachmann (GER)	Quick-Step Floors	+ 21"
7	Peter Sagan (SVK)	Bora–Hansgrohe	+ 23"
8	Maciej Bodnar (POL)	Bora–Hansgrohe	+ 23"
9	Martin Elmiger (SUI)	BMC Racing Team	+ 25"
10	Nils Politt (GER)	Team Katusha–Alpecin	+ 27"

General classification after Stage 6
Rank	Rider	Team	Time
1	George Bennett (NZL)	LottoNL–Jumbo	20h 16' 48"
2	Rafał Majka (POL)	Bora–Hansgrohe	+ 35"
3	Andrew Talansky (USA)	Cannondale–Drapac	+ 36"
4	Brent Bookwalter (USA)	BMC Racing Team	+ 45"
5	Ian Boswell (USA)	Team Sky	+ 1' 00"
6	Vegard Stake Laengen (NOR)	UAE Team Emirates	+ 1' 54"
7	Tao Geoghegan Hart (GBR)	Team Sky	+ 2' 12"
8	Sam Oomen (NED)	Team Sunweb	+ 2' 15"
9	Lachlan Morton (AUS)	Team Dimension Data	+ 2' 20"
10	Haimar Zubeldia (ESP)	Trek–Segafredo	+ 3' 14"

=== Stage 7 ===
20 May 2017 — Mountain High to Pasadena, 125 km (77.7 mi)

Stage 7 result
Rank	Rider	Team	Time
1	Evan Huffman (USA)	Rally Cycling	2h 37' 28"
2	David López (ESP)	Team Sky	+ 0"
3	Nicolas Edet (FRA)	Cofidis	+ 0"
4	Lachlan Morton (AUS)	Team Dimension Data	+ 0"
5	Rob Britton (CAN)	Rally Cycling	+ 0"
6	Peter Sagan (SVK)	Bora–Hansgrohe	+ 22"
7	Matteo Trentin (ITA)	Quick-Step Floors	+ 22"
8	John Degenkolb (GER)	Trek–Segafredo	+ 22"
9	Ben King (USA)	Team Dimension Data	+ 22"
10	Jhonatan Restrepo (COL)	Team Katusha–Alpecin	+ 22"

Final general classification
Rank	Rider	Team	Time
1	George Bennett (NZL)	LottoNL–Jumbo	22h 54' 38"
2	Rafał Majka (POL)	Bora–Hansgrohe	+ 35"
3	Andrew Talansky (USA)	Cannondale–Drapac	+ 36"
4	Brent Bookwalter (USA)	BMC Racing Team	+ 45"
5	Ian Boswell (USA)	Team Sky	+ 1' 00"
6	Vegard Stake Laengen (NOR)	UAE Team Emirates	+ 1' 54"
7	Lachlan Morton (AUS)	Team Dimension Data	+ 1' 55"
8	Tao Geoghegan Hart (GBR)	Team Sky	+ 2' 12"
9	Sam Oomen (NED)	Team Sunweb	+ 2' 15"
10	Haimar Zubeldia (ESP)	Trek–Segafredo	+ 3' 14"

== Classification leadership table ==
In the 2017 Tour of California, five different jerseys were awarded. For the general classification, calculated by adding each cyclist's finishing times on each stage, and allowing time bonuses for the first three finishers at intermediate sprints and at the finish of mass-start stages, the leader received a yellow jersey. This classification was considered the most important of the 2017 Tour of California, and the winner of the classification was considered the winner of the race.

Additionally, there was a sprints classification, which awarded a green jersey. In the sprints classification, cyclists received points for finishing in the top 10 in a stage. For winning a stage, a rider earned 15 points, with 12 for second, 9 for third, 7 for fourth with a point fewer per place down to a single point for 10th place. Points towards the classification could also be accrued – awarded on a 3–2–1 scale – at intermediate sprint points during each stage; these intermediate sprints also offered bonus seconds towards the general classification. There was also a mountains classification, the leadership of which was marked by a white jersey with red polka dots. In the mountains classification, points were won by reaching the top of a climb before other cyclists, with more points available for the higher-categorised climbs.

The fourth jersey represented the young rider classification, marked by a predominantly "white design" jersey. This was decided in the same way as the general classification, but only riders born after 1 January 1992 were eligible to be ranked in the classification. There was also a classification for teams, in which the times of the best three cyclists per team on each stage were added together; the leading team at the end of the race was the team with the lowest total time. In addition, there was a combativity award given after each stage to the rider considered, by a jury, to have "who best exemplifies the character of those engaged in the fight against cancer / heart disease", in line with the jersey's sponsors. This award was marked by a blue jersey.

Stage	Winner	General classification	Sprints classification	Mountains classification	Young rider classification	Most courageous rider	Team classification
1	Marcel Kittel	Marcel Kittel	Marcel Kittel (Note: In stage 2, Peter Sagan, who was second in the sprints classification, wore the green jersey, because Marcel Kittel (in first place) wore the yellow jersey as leader of the general classification during that stage.)	Not awarded	Floris Gerts	Ben Wolfe	Team Katusha–Alpecin
2	Rafał Majka	Rafał Majka	Rafał Majka (Note: In stage 3, Marcel Kittel, who was second in the sprints classification, wore the green jersey, because Rafał Majka (in first place) wore the yellow jersey as leader of the general classification during that stage.)	Daniel Jaramillo	Lachlan Morton	George Bennett	Team Sky
3	Peter Sagan	Rafał Majka	Peter Sagan	Daniel Jaramillo	Lachlan Morton	Ben Wolfe	Team Sky
4	Evan Huffman	Rafał Majka	Peter Sagan	Daniel Jaramillo	Lachlan Morton	Evan Huffman	Team Sky
5	Andrew Talansky	Rafał Majka	Peter Sagan	Daniel Jaramillo	Lachlan Morton	Rob Britton	Team Sky
6	Jonathan Dibben	George Bennett	Peter Sagan	Daniel Jaramillo	Tao Geoghegan Hart	Not awarded	Team Sky
7	Evan Huffman	George Bennett	Peter Sagan	Daniel Jaramillo	Lachlan Morton	Evan Huffman	Team Sky
Final		George Bennett	Peter Sagan	Daniel Jaramillo	Lachlan Morton	Not awarded	Team Sky
