= 2013 Paris–Nice =

2013 UCI World Tour, race 2 of 28
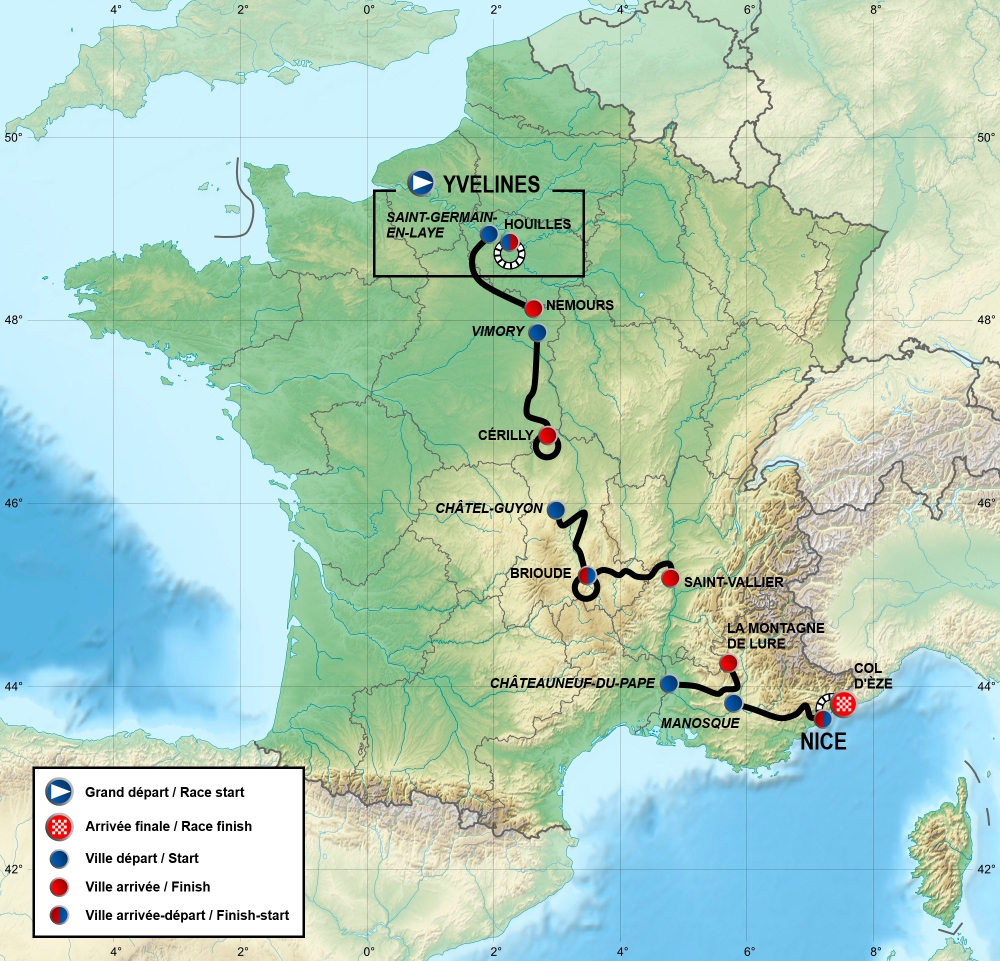
- Route of the 2013 Paris–Nice

Race details
- Dates: 3–10 March 2013
- Stages: 8
- Distance: 1,174 km (729.5 mi)
- Winning time: 29h 59' 47"

Results
Jersey awarded to the overall winner	Winner	Richie Porte (AUS)	(Team Sky)
	Second	Andrew Talansky (USA)	(Garmin–Sharp)
	Third	Jean-Christophe Péraud (FRA)	(Ag2r–La Mondiale)
Jersey awarded to the points classification winner	Points	Sylvain Chavanel (FRA)	(Omega Pharma–Quick-Step)
Jersey awarded to the mountains classification winner	Mountains	Johann Tschopp (SWI)	(IAM Cycling)
Jersey awarded to the youth classification winner	Youth	Andrew Talansky (USA)	(Garmin–Sharp)
	Team	Team Katusha	

The 2013 Paris–Nice was the 71st running of the Paris–Nice cycling stage race, often known as the Race to the Sun. It started on 3 March in Houilles and ended on 10 March in Nice and consisted of eight stages, including a race-commencing prologue and a race-concluding mountain individual time trial. It was the second race of the 2013 UCI World Tour season.

The race was won by Australia's Richie Porte of Team Sky, who took the lead after winning the race's queen stage – the fifth stage – to La Montagne de Lure, and also won the final time trial at Col d'Èze, to become the first Australian rider to win the race. Porte won the general classification by 55 seconds over runner-up Andrew Talansky (Garmin–Sharp), who was winner of the race's third stage. Talansky also won the white jersey for the young rider classification, as he was the highest placed rider born in 1988 or later. Ag2r–La Mondiale's Jean-Christophe Péraud completed the podium, 26 seconds behind Talansky and 81 seconds down on Porte.

In the race's other classifications, Omega Pharma–Quick-Step's Sylvain Chavanel was the winner of the green jersey for the points classification, amassing the highest number of points during stages at intermediate sprints and stage finishes, and Johann Tschopp was the winner of the mountains classification for the IAM Cycling team, who were making their World Tour début at the race. Team Katusha were the winners of the teams classification on their World Tour return, having missed the Tour Down Under after temporarily losing their World Tour status before successfully appealing the decision to the Court of Arbitration for Sport.

== Teams ==
As Paris–Nice was a UCI World Tour event, all UCI ProTeams were invited automatically and obligated to send a squad. Originally, eighteen ProTeams were invited to the race, with four other squads given wildcard places, and as such, would have formed the event's 22-team peloton. Team Katusha subsequently regained their ProTour status after an appeal to the Court of Arbitration for Sport. With Team Katusha not originally invited to the race, race organisers announced their inclusion to the race, bringing the total number of teams competing to twenty-three.

The 23 teams that competed in the race were:

- Ag2r–La Mondiale
- Argos–Shimano
- Astana
- Blanco Pro Cycling
- BMC Racing Team
- Cannondale
- Cofidis
- Team Europcar
- Euskaltel–Euskadi
- FDJ
- Garmin–Sharp
- IAM Cycling
- Team Katusha
- Lampre–Merida
- Lotto–Belisol
- Movistar Team
- Omega Pharma–Quick-Step
- Orica–GreenEDGE
- RadioShack–Leopard
- Saxo–Tinkoff
- Team Sky
- Sojasun
- Vacansoleil–DCM

Among the 184-rider start list was only one previous race winner; Andreas Klöden, who triumphed in 2000, competed for the RadioShack–Leopard team.

== Route ==
Stage characteristics and winners
Stage	Date	Course	Distance	Type	Winner
P	3 March	Houilles	2.9 km (1.8 mi)	Individual time trial	Damien Gaudin (FRA)
1	4 March	Saint-Germain-en-Laye to Nemours	195 km (121 mi)	Flat stage	Nacer Bouhanni (FRA)
2	5 March	Vimory to Cérilly	200.5 km (124.6 mi)	Flat stage	Marcel Kittel (GER)
3	6 March	Châtel-Guyon to Brioude	170.5 km (105.9 mi)	Hilly stage	Andrew Talansky (USA)
4	7 March	Brioude to Saint-Vallier	199.5 km (124.0 mi)	Hilly stage	Michael Albasini (SUI)
5	8 March	Châteauneuf-du-Pape to La Montagne de Lure	176 km (109 mi)	Medium mountain stage	Richie Porte (AUS)
6	9 March	Manosque to Nice	220 km (140 mi)	Medium mountain stage	Sylvain Chavanel (FRA)
7	10 March	Nice to Col d'Èze	9.6 km (6.0 mi)	Individual time trial	Richie Porte (AUS)

== Stages ==
=== Prologue ===
3 March 2013 — Houilles, 2.9 km (1.8 mi) (ITT)

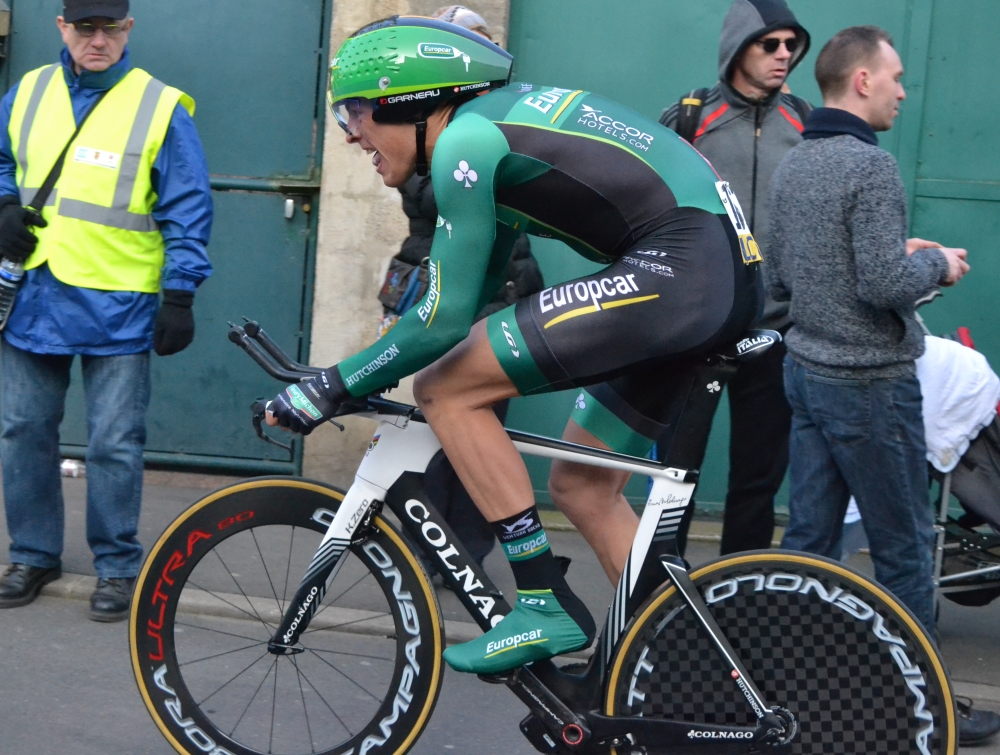
Team Europcar rider Damien Gaudin took the first victory of his professional career, winning the stage in a time of 3' 37".

The opening stage of the 2013 Paris–Nice was a short, flat, yet technical individual time trial stage in and around the Yvelines commune of Houilles, around 15 km (9.3 mi) outside Paris. Packed into just under 3 km (1.9 mi) of racing were numerous 90-degree bends, requiring riders to make short, sharp bursts of acceleration. As such, the stage itself was not suited towards any kind of time trial specialists; instead, riders who had a track background, rouleurs or certain sprinters who had sufficient pace to complete the course in a favourable time. Weather was not expected to be a major factor in the stage proceedings, unlike previous race-opening time trial stages. Marco Bandiera was the first rider to start the stage, on the World Tour début for his team, IAM Cycling.

Bandiera recorded a time of 3' 55" for the course, but was almost immediately bettered by Team Katusha's Yuri Trofimov and Omega Pharma–Quick-Step rider Stijn Vandenbergh. Vandenbergh's time of 3' 50" was marginally beaten by Sébastien Minard of Ag2r–La Mondiale, setting the tone for most of the stage with numerous placings set to be settled by tenths of a second. FDJ sprinter Nacer Bouhanni, riding a road bike for the course, was the first rider to go beneath 3' 50", as he set a time of 3' 47". However, his stay at the top was also short-lived as Blanco Pro Cycling's Maarten Tjallingii went three seconds quicker to move to the top of the timesheets. Astana sprinter Borut Božič was the next rider to assume the stage lead, as he set a time of 3' 40"; his time was ultimately good enough for a final placing of eighth. Božič's time provided a stiff test for the majority of the field, as his time held on at the top for over half an hour, but Peter Velits (Omega Pharma–Quick-Step) ultimately went quicker by less than a second to take the lead.

Another FDJ sprinter, and former French under-23 time trial champion, Geoffrey Soupe was the first rider to go underneath 3' 40", but he would ultimately lose out on white jersey honours – for young rider classification leader – to Tjallingii's teammate Wilco Kelderman, who completed the course marginally quicker. French national champion Sylvain Chavanel was next to assume the lead for Omega Pharma–Quick-Step, going a second faster than Kelderman, but immediately after, Damien Gaudin – a former team pursuitist on the track for France – knocked another second off the benchmark for Team Europcar. Gaudin's time of 3' 37" held until the end of the stage, and gave him his first victory as a professional, a performance he later described as "mad". Besides Chavanel, Lieuwe Westra recorded the best time of the overall contenders for Vacansoleil–DCM, finishing less than a second off Gaudin's stage-winning time, in third position. Both riders were satisfied with their performances post-stage.

Prologue Result and General Classification after Prologue

	Rider	Team	Time
1	Damien Gaudin (FRA)	Team Europcar	3' 37"
2	Sylvain Chavanel (FRA)	Omega Pharma–Quick-Step	+ 1"
3	Lieuwe Westra (NED)	Vacansoleil–DCM	+ 1"
4	Wilco Kelderman (NED)	Blanco Pro Cycling	+ 2"
5	Geoffrey Soupe (FRA)	FDJ	+ 2"
6	Peter Velits (SVK)	Omega Pharma–Quick-Step	+ 3"
7	Tony Gallopin (FRA)	RadioShack–Leopard	+ 3"
8	Borut Božič (SLO)	Astana	+ 3"
9	Sébastien Turgot (FRA)	Team Europcar	+ 4"
10	Andriy Hrivko (UKR)	Astana	+ 5"

=== Stage 1 ===
4 March 2013 — Saint-Germain-en-Laye to Nemours, 195 km (121.2 mi)

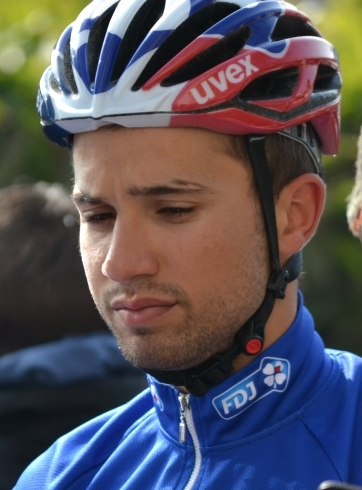
FDJ rider Nacer Bouhanni – pictured after the prologue – won the sprint finish into Nemours, to take the overall lead of the race, ahead of overnight leader Damien Gaudin of Team Europcar.

The first mass-start stage of the race was set up ideally for the sprinters, with very little on the course to threaten the peloton. Over the course of the 195 km (121.2 mi) parcours, there was very little fluctuation of altitude, even with only one categorised climb en route. The fourth-category Côte de Buthiers ascent offered the first points towards the mountains classification of the race, but at 500 m (1,600 ft) long and a gradient of 4.2%, was not going to test the riders too much. Intermediate sprints at Malesherbes and La Madeleine-sur-Loing offered bonus seconds towards the general classification, the latter coming on a 47 km (29.2 mi) loop around Nemours, before the stage finish.

A trio of riders – Vacansoleil–DCM's Bert-Jan Lindeman, Euskaltel–Euskadi rider Romain Sicard and Yannick Talabardon of Sojasun – made the early breakaway from the field, and managed to extend their advantage to the peloton to almost seven-and-a-half minutes at one point during the stage, before eventually stabilising at the five-minute mark for the majority of the stage. Lindeman took maximum points on offer during the stage; he crossed each of the two intermediate sprint lines in first position, ahead of Talabardon and Sicard on both occasions, while it was the same order at the Côte de Buthiers, where Lindeman secured the polka-dot jersey for the day. After the climb, there was a crash in the peloton, which forced Rui Costa (Movistar Team) to withdraw from the race, with a wrist injury, bruising and stitches.

As the leaders were brought back towards the main field, an increase of pace in the peloton caused it to separate, and caught out several of the expected stage challengers, such as Argos–Shimano's Marcel Kittel and Omega Pharma–Quick-Step's Tom Boonen, who won the first mass-start stage in the 2012 edition of the race. Both riders would eventually finish in a group that finished just under two minutes behind the lead group. The lead trio were eventually caught with around 23 km (14.3 mi) remaining, with the sprinters' teams moving towards the front of the peloton from there on, before the finish in Nemours. Orica–GreenEDGE tried to set it up for Leigh Howard but their sprint train was overhauled by Boonen's teammate Sylvain Chavanel, who launched his sprint first. French national champion Nacer Bouhanni (FDJ) launched his sprint off Chavanel's wheel, and went side-by-side with Alessandro Petacchi of Lampre–Merida, with Bouhanni just prevailing ahead of Petacchi and Cannondale's Elia Viviani. With ten bonus seconds on the finish line, Bouhanni took the leader's yellow jersey from Team Europcar's Damien Gaudin, who finished in the main field.

Stage 1 Result

	Rider	Team	Time
1	Nacer Bouhanni (FRA)	FDJ	4h 47' 24"
2	Alessandro Petacchi (ITA)	Lampre–Merida	s.t.
3	Elia Viviani (ITA)	Cannondale	s.t.
4	Jens Debusschere (BEL)	Lotto–Belisol	s.t.
5	Heinrich Haussler (AUS)	IAM Cycling	s.t.
6	Mark Renshaw (AUS)	Blanco Pro Cycling	s.t.
7	José Joaquín Rojas (ESP)	Movistar Team	s.t.
8	Leigh Howard (AUS)	Orica–GreenEDGE	s.t.
9	Borut Božič (SLO)	Astana	s.t.
10	Romain Feillu (FRA)	Vacansoleil–DCM	s.t.

General Classification after Stage 1

	Rider	Team	Time
1	Nacer Bouhanni (FRA)	FDJ	4h 51' 01"
2	Damien Gaudin (FRA)	Team Europcar	+ 0"
3	Sylvain Chavanel (FRA)	Omega Pharma–Quick-Step	+ 1"
4	Lieuwe Westra (NED)	Vacansoleil–DCM	+ 1"
5	Elia Viviani (ITA)	Cannondale	+ 1"
6	Alessandro Petacchi (ITA)	Lampre–Merida	+ 2"
7	Wilco Kelderman (NED)	Blanco Pro Cycling	+ 2"
8	Geoffrey Soupe (FRA)	FDJ	+ 2"
9	Peter Velits (SVK)	Omega Pharma–Quick-Step	+ 3"
10	Tony Gallopin (FRA)	RadioShack–Leopard	+ 3"

=== Stage 2 ===
5 March 2013 — Vimory to Cérilly, 200.5 km (124.6 mi)

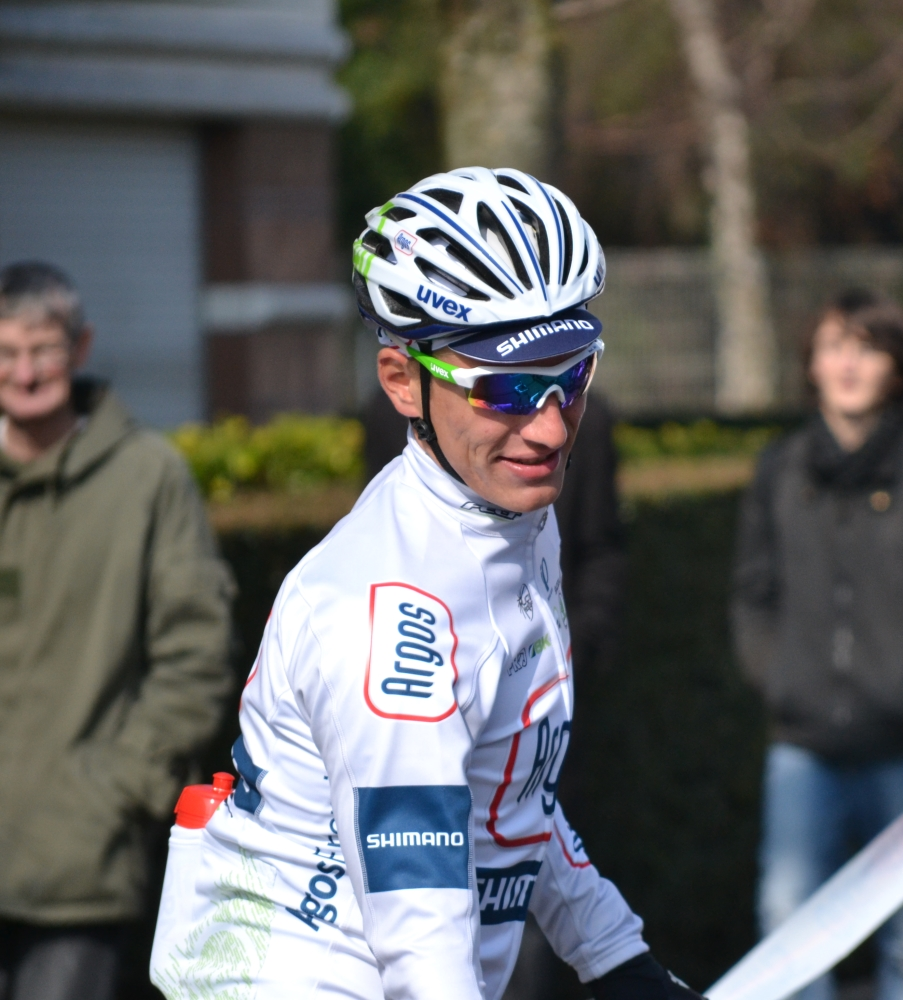
Argos–Shimano sprinter Marcel Kittel – pictured before the prologue – claimed his second victory of the 2013 season, winning the uphill sprint into Cérilly.

The second stage was run predominantly in a north-to-south direction, starting in Vimory in the Loiret department and finishing in the Allier commune of Cérilly, via a finishing loop of 18 km (11.2 mi) in length, and two intermediate sprint points – one in Les Choux, while the other came on the first passage of the finish line in Cérilly – respectively. Although there were no categorised climbs during the stage, the final kilometre of the stage – at the end of a 4 km (2.5 mi) long stretch of road – was uphill, reaching a gradient of 4% in certain places. However, the stage was still designed to suit the sprinters, with the uphill finish also aiding the chances for the puncheurs.

Strong headwinds were prominent during the stage, although this did not stop three riders attacking in the opening kilometre; Kris Boeckmans of Vacansoleil–DCM was joined by Saxo–Tinkoff's Mads Christensen and Team Katusha's Gatis Smukulis, and the trio remained together until Les Choux, when Boeckmans elected to return to the main field after winning the intermediate sprint. Smukulis and Christensen soldiered on with a lead of around four minutes, but the peloton were back together by the 43 km (26.7 mi) mark, as FDJ established the pace of the group, to keep the overall leader Nacer Bouhanni out of danger. After around 20 km (12.4 mi) of stasis within the field, two of Boeckmans' teammates – Thomas De Gendt and Juan Antonio Flecha – attacked, along with Euskaltel–Euskadi rider Mikel Astarloza and Maxime Bouet of Ag2r–La Mondiale, and their advantage reached a similar mark to that achieved by the first breakaway, at around four minutes. FDJ continued to set the pace on the front, bringing the lead gap to around a minute with 60 km (37.3 mi) remaining.

However, Bouhanni hit the ground heavily while negotiating a left-hand bend, falling face first. He had to abandon the race with two broken teeth, and required eight stitches for a burst lip. The peloton was neutralised as Bouhanni was receiving treatment by the roadside, but the pace lifted once again, after confirmation of Bouhanni's abandonment had been received by his teammates. The breakaway was negated with 45 km (28.0 mi) left to cover of the stage, when the sprinters' teams started to make early headway towards the front of the peloton. Cannondale, Omega Pharma–Quick-Step and Argos–Shimano moved forward ahead of the second intermediate sprint, where Elia Viviani took maximum points for Cannondale, ahead of Sylvain Chavanel (Omega Pharma–Quick-Step) and the rest of the field. Several solo attacks were neutralised on the loop around Cérilly, which set up a sprint finish. Lampre–Merida tried to launch Alessandro Petacchi first, but Marcel Kittel (Argos–Shimano) finished strongest down the right-hand side of the road and achieved his second win of the season by three bike lengths. Finishing just behind was Viviani, who became the race's third leader in successive days, as well as taking the lead of both the points and young rider classifications.

Stage 2 Result

	Rider	Team	Time
1	Marcel Kittel (GER)	Argos–Shimano	5h 42' 18"
2	Elia Viviani (ITA)	Cannondale	s.t.
3	Leigh Howard (AUS)	Orica–GreenEDGE	s.t.
4	Borut Božič (SLO)	Astana	s.t.
5	Samuel Dumoulin (FRA)	Ag2r–La Mondiale	s.t.
6	Gianni Meersman (BEL)	Omega Pharma–Quick-Step	s.t.
7	Romain Feillu (FRA)	Vacansoleil–DCM	s.t.
8	Jens Debusschere (BEL)	Lotto–Belisol	s.t.
9	José Joaquín Rojas (ESP)	Movistar Team	s.t.
10	Tony Gallopin (FRA)	RadioShack–Leopard	s.t.

General Classification after Stage 2

	Rider	Team	Time
1	Elia Viviani (ITA)	Cannondale	10h 33' 11"
2	Sylvain Chavanel (FRA)	Omega Pharma–Quick-Step	+ 7"
3	Damien Gaudin (FRA)	Team Europcar	+ 8"
4	Lieuwe Westra (NED)	Vacansoleil–DCM	+ 9"
5	Alessandro Petacchi (ITA)	Lampre–Merida	+ 10"
6	Wilco Kelderman (NED)	Blanco Pro Cycling	+ 10"
7	Geoffrey Soupe (FRA)	FDJ	+ 10"
8	Peter Velits (SVK)	Omega Pharma–Quick-Step	+ 11"
9	Tony Gallopin (FRA)	RadioShack–Leopard	+ 11"
10	Borut Božič (SLO)	Astana	+ 11"

=== Stage 3 ===
6 March 2013 — Châtel-Guyon to Brioude, 170.5 km (105.9 mi)

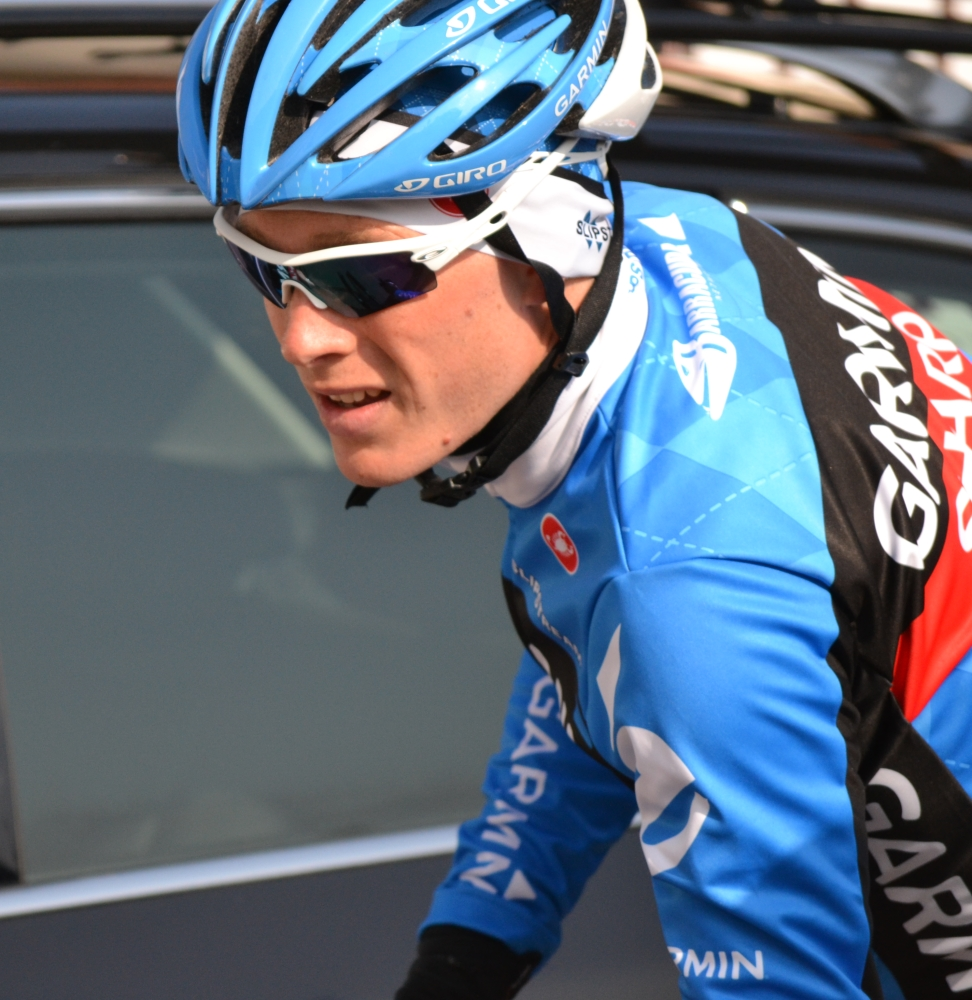
Garmin–Sharp rider Andrew Talansky – pictured before the prologue – achieved his first victory at World Tour level, winning a seven-rider sprint in Brioude. His stage victory also enabled him to become the race's fourth different leader in four stages.

Following the sprinter-friendly stages of the previous two days, the third stage was more undulating and included three categorised climbs during its 170.5 km (105.9 mi) itinerary. In between the two intermediate sprint points – coming in the communes of Joze, and in Brioude itself – were two third-category climbs of the Col de Potey and the Côte de la Forêt de la Comté, but neither averaged more than 5% in gradient over the duration of their ascents. After reaching Brioude, the peloton completed a finishing loop of around 28 km (17.4 mi) in length; halfway around the loop was the day's final climb, the second-category Côte de Mauvagnat ascent, a 2.7 km (1.7 mi) long climb with a listed average gradient of 6.7%. The climb itself was seen as the pivotal point of the day's action, whether the sprinters could stay with the main field before the descent back into Brioude.

Heavy rain made riding conditions slightly treacherous, but the day's breakaway formed in the opening kilometres as normal. For the second day running, Saxo–Tinkoff's Mads Christensen made it into an attacking move, where he was joined by Vacansoleil–DCM rider Martijn Keizer, Sébastien Minard (Ag2r–La Mondiale) and Alexis Vuillermoz of the Sojasun team. The quartet slowly built up their advantage over the peloton, being led by the Cannondale team – protecting the race leader Elia Viviani – to a maximum advantage of around four minutes. Keizer led the group over the top of the two third-category climbs, and as a result, took the polka-dot jersey for mountains classification leader away from his teammate Bert-Jan Lindeman. The quartet were slowly brought back, and with added impetus from Team Katusha, RadioShack–Leopard and Astana, the peloton had caught them prior to the Côte de Mauvagnat, with 23 km (14.3 mi) remaining. After several foiled attacks from his Astana teammate Maxim Iglinsky, Andriy Hrivko attacked towards the top of the Côte de Mauvagnat, and managed to build a small advantage before Team Sky's Vasil Kiryienka bridged the gap on the descent from the climb.

Kiryienka crashed on the wet roads several kilometres later, which delayed Hrivko enough for him to be caught by a group of four riders – Kiryienka's teammate David López, Gorka Izagirre of Euskaltel–Euskadi, Team Europcar's Davide Malacarne and hometown rider Romain Bardet (Ag2r–La Mondiale) – which later became seven riders in total as another Team Sky rider joined the lead group, with Richie Porte linking up with Garmin–Sharp's Andrew Talansky. BMC Racing Team and Omega Pharma–Quick-Step tried to lead the chase for the respective overall contenders Tejay van Garderen and Sylvain Chavanel, but the lead group managed to survive off the front by seconds. Malacarne tried a solo attack at the flamme rouge, but was chased down not long after, gesturing at his fellow escapees as they did so. Porte tried a long stint on the front of the group, but Bardet accelerated past him only to fade shortly after, and it was Talansky that prevailed by a bike length over Malacarne and Izagirre. With Viviani distanced on the final climb, Talansky became the race's fourth different leader, taking the young rider lead from Viviani as well.

Stage 3 Result

	Rider	Team	Time
1	Andrew Talansky (USA)	Garmin–Sharp	4h 06' 15"
2	Davide Malacarne (ITA)	Team Europcar	s.t.
3	Gorka Izagirre (ESP)	Euskaltel–Euskadi	s.t.
4	David López (ESP)	Team Sky	s.t.
5	Richie Porte (AUS)	Team Sky	s.t.
6	Romain Bardet (FRA)	Ag2r–La Mondiale	s.t.
7	Andriy Hrivko (UKR)	Astana	s.t.
8	Jonathan Hivert (FRA)	Sojasun	+ 7"
9	Enrico Gasparotto (ITA)	Astana	+ 7"
10	Maxime Bouet (FRA)	Ag2r–La Mondiale	+ 7"

General Classification after Stage 3

	Rider	Team	Time
1	Andrew Talansky (USA)	Garmin–Sharp	14h 39' 36"
2	Andriy Hrivko (UKR)	Astana	+ 3"
3	Davide Malacarne (ITA)	Team Europcar	+ 3"
4	Sylvain Chavanel (FRA)	Omega Pharma–Quick-Step	+ 4"
5	Gorka Izagirre (ESP)	Euskaltel–Euskadi	+ 5"
6	Lieuwe Westra (NED)	Vacansoleil–DCM	+ 6"
7	Richie Porte (AUS)	Team Sky	+ 7"
8	Peter Velits (SVK)	Omega Pharma–Quick-Step	+ 8"
9	David López (ESP)	Team Sky	+ 9"
10	Jonathan Hivert (FRA)	Sojasun	+ 12"

=== Stage 4 ===
7 March 2013 — Brioude to Saint-Vallier, 199.5 km (124.0 mi)

Starting in the previous day's finishing commune of Brioude, the fourth stage was packed full of climbs, with a total of seven over the course of the 199.5 km (124.0 mi) parcours. The last two climbs – both coming inside the final 25 km (15.5 mi) of racing – were both second-category ascents of the Côte de Talencieux and the Côte de la Sizeranne, with gradients of 8.1% and 6.6% respectively. The Côte de la Sizeranne, which was situated 8.5 km (5.3 mi) from the finish in Saint-Vallier, had most recently featured during the first stage of the 2012 Critérium du Dauphiné; the climb had been a catalyst to a late-stage attack from Cadel Evans, Jérôme Coppel and Andrey Kashechkin, with the trio managing to hold off the advancing peloton by just four seconds. Along with the seven climbs, there were two intermediate sprint points at La Chaise-Dieu and Saint-Romain-d'Ay.

After an initial solo move from Saxo–Tinkoff's Michael Mørkøv was chased down, Gianni Meersman (Omega Pharma–Quick-Step) along with Johann Tschopp of IAM Cycling and Javier Moreno of the Movistar Team went clear on the day's first climb, the Côte de Lachaud. Moreno elected not to continue with the breakaway, but the group remained as a trio, as Team Europcar's Thomas Voeckler moved up on them. After a near-40 km (24.9 mi) chase, Mørkøv and three other riders – Argos–Shimano rider Warren Barguil, Hubert Dupont of Ag2r–La Mondiale and Euskaltel–Euskadi's Romain Sicard – were able to join the lead trio and eventually formed a breakaway of seven. The group's maximum advantage was around four minutes, with Garmin–Sharp setting the pace for race leader Andrew Talansky. Numerous teams had stints on the front of the peloton, as they steadily brought back the lead group, as Tschopp accumulated enough points to take the polka-dot jersey as mountains classification leader.

With 25 km (15.5 mi) remaining, Voeckler made a move off the front of the lead group, with only Dupont able to follow in the original instance. Tschopp and Meersman both later rejoined in the crosswinds, while behind the peloton was splitting into several groups; the front group of the main field eventually recaptured the four leaders with around 15 km (9.3 mi) remaining. With the group back together, several riders attempted to create solo moves on the final climb, the Côte de la Sizeranne, and on its descent. Omega Pharma–Quick-Step's Sylvain Chavanel was prominent in several moves on the climb; with assistance from teammate Kevin De Weert, Chavanel chased down a move by Maxime Monfort, but was not allowed to gain sufficient ground due to his placing in the general classification. Coppel tried to repeat his Dauphiné move in the closing stages, but it was left to a group sprint of around forty riders. Maxim Iglinsky was first to launch his sprint for Astana, but Michael Albasini finished the strongest to take the victory for Orica–GreenEDGE. Iglinsky managed to hold on to second ahead of Chavanel's teammate Peter Velits, while Talansky maintained the race lead with a sixth-place finish.

Stage 4 Result

	Rider	Team	Time
1	Michael Albasini (SUI)	Orica–GreenEDGE	4h 55' 41"
2	Maxim Iglinsky (KAZ)	Astana	s.t.
3	Peter Velits (SVK)	Omega Pharma–Quick-Step	s.t.
4	Enrico Gasparotto (ITA)	Astana	s.t.
5	Diego Ulissi (ITA)	Lampre–Merida	s.t.
6	Andrew Talansky (USA)	Garmin–Sharp	s.t.
7	Romain Bardet (FRA)	Ag2r–La Mondiale	s.t.
8	Jens Keukeleire (BEL)	Orica–GreenEDGE	s.t.
9	Andreas Klöden (GER)	RadioShack–Leopard	s.t.
10	Xavier Florencio (ESP)	Team Katusha	s.t.

General Classification after Stage 4

	Rider	Team	Time
1	Andrew Talansky (USA)	Garmin–Sharp	19h 35' 17"
2	Andriy Hrivko (UKR)	Astana	+ 3"
3	Peter Velits (SVK)	Omega Pharma–Quick-Step	+ 4"
4	Sylvain Chavanel (FRA)	Omega Pharma–Quick-Step	+ 4"
5	Gorka Izagirre (ESP)	Euskaltel–Euskadi	+ 5"
6	Lieuwe Westra (NED)	Vacansoleil–DCM	+ 6"
7	Richie Porte (AUS)	Team Sky	+ 7"
8	Maxim Iglinsky (KAZ)	Astana	+ 13"
9	Jean-Christophe Péraud (FRA)	Ag2r–La Mondiale	+ 13"
10	Bart De Clercq (BEL)	Lotto–Belisol	+ 15"

=== Stage 5 ===
8 March 2013 — Châteauneuf-du-Pape to La Montagne de Lure, 176 km (109.4 mi)

The queen stage of the 2013 Paris–Nice, the fifth stage included the only summit finish of the race, finishing 1,600 metres (5,200 ft) above sea level at La Montagne de Lure after a near-14 km (8.7 mi) climb at an average gradient of 6.6% and reaching 8.5% in places. The climb itself was the last of six categorised climbs during the stage, although the other climbs en route – mainly second- and third-category climbs compared to the first-category finishing climb – were less steep and challenging to the field as a whole. Also as part of the parcours were two intermediate sprint points at Saint-Saturnin-lès-Apt and Forcalquier. La Montagne de Lure, described as the "little sister of Mont Ventoux", had previously featured in the race in 2009, when Alberto Contador soloed to victory during that year's sixth stage, beating closest rivals Fränk Schleck and Luis León Sánchez by almost a minute, and taking the race lead in the process.

RadioShack–Leopard's Jens Voigt – who finished in the top ten on the stage in 2009 – initiated the day's breakaway after 14 km (8.7 mi) of racing, and was later joined by Sojasun rider Cyril Lemoine, Paolo Longo Borghini of Cannondale and Thierry Hupond of the Argos–Shimano team. The quartet steadily built up a lead over the peloton, eventually reaching a maximum advantage of around six-and-a-half minutes, but still causing no threat overall as Hupond was the best placed of the riders, some nine minutes behind the overnight leader Garmin–Sharp's Andrew Talansky. For most of the stage, the advantage remained between four and five minutes, with Talansky's squad maintaining their presence at the front of the peloton. Heading towards the final climb at La Montagne de Lure, the leaders still held a lead of approaching two minutes but was quickly being dwindled, with Team Sky moving their riders towards the front.

At the foot of the climb, Voigt attacked on his own for the second time during the stage, as the peloton began to shrink with the pace mainly being set by Kanstantsin Sivtsov and David López, with the squad's leader Richie Porte just behind them. Voigt's fellow breakaway companions were caught with around 10 km (6.2 mi) remaining, while Voigt remained a further minute up the road. He was caught 3 km (1.9 mi) later, which set up a spate of attacks in the following few kilometres. Michele Scarponi was able to gain a slight advantage for Lampre–Merida, to which Talansky and Porte later closed down, while Nairo Quintana (Movistar Team) also latched onto the group. Talansky tried a second move, but Quintana led the rest of the ever-decreasing group up to him. Denis Menchov attacked just before 2 km (1.2 mi) to go, and was initially given freedom to build a gap, at which point, Talansky made a third move before Porte closed him down again. Porte launched his own attack with 1.4 km (0.9 mi) left, quickly catching and passing Menchov, and soloed away to the stage victory and the yellow jersey. Menchov finished second, 26 seconds behind, while Talansky led a small group over the line in third, 33 seconds behind Porte.

Stage 5 Result

	Rider	Team	Time
1	Richie Porte (AUS)	Team Sky	4h 50' 54"
2	Denis Menchov (RUS)	Team Katusha	+ 26"
3	Andrew Talansky (USA)	Garmin–Sharp	+ 33"
4	Tejay van Garderen (USA)	BMC Racing Team	+ 33"
5	Diego Ulissi (ITA)	Lampre–Merida	+ 33"
6	Lieuwe Westra (NED)	Vacansoleil–DCM	+ 33"
7	Jean-Christophe Péraud (FRA)	Ag2r–La Mondiale	+ 33"
8	Nairo Quintana (COL)	Movistar Team	+ 33"
9	Simon Špilak (SLO)	Team Katusha	+ 33"
10	Michele Scarponi (ITA)	Lampre–Merida	+ 33"

General Classification after Stage 5

	Rider	Team	Time
1	Richie Porte (AUS)	Team Sky	24h 26' 08"
2	Andrew Talansky (USA)	Garmin–Sharp	+ 32"
3	Lieuwe Westra (NED)	Vacansoleil–DCM	+ 42"
4	Jean-Christophe Péraud (FRA)	Ag2r–La Mondiale	+ 49"
5	Tejay van Garderen (USA)	BMC Racing Team	+ 52"
6	Sylvain Chavanel (FRA)	Omega Pharma–Quick-Step	+ 53"
7	Simon Špilak (SLO)	Team Katusha	+ 53"
8	Diego Ulissi (ITA)	Lampre–Merida	+ 54"
9	Michele Scarponi (ITA)	Lampre–Merida	+ 54"
10	Peter Velits (SVK)	Omega Pharma–Quick-Step	+ 56"

=== Stage 6 ===
9 March 2013 — Manosque to Nice, 220 km (136.7 mi)

The penultimate stage of the race was also its longest of the 2013 edition, with a 220 km (136.7 mi) itinerary for the peloton as the race moved towards the coast and Nice itself. There were five categorised climbs on the route, the first of which commenced just after the 2 km (1.2 mi) point of the stage, with the third-category Côte du Bois de Rousset climb, an ascent of 4.4 km (2.7 mi) and a 4.5% average gradient. The tougher climbs came in the second half of the stage, with a pair of first-category climbs – the Côte de Cabris, 7.6 km (4.7 mi) at 5.8% and the Col du Ferrier, 4.3 km (2.7 mi) at 6.8% – but with the summit of the Col du Ferrier still being over 70 km (43.5 mi) from the finish, on the Promenade des Anglais in Nice. As a result, it was still expected to come down to a sprint finish at the end, but the severity of the climbs was certain to rule out many of the pure sprinters from the finish.

Astana rider Egor Silin was the catalyst of the breakaway, attacking on the Côte du Bois de Rousset, gaining maximum points on offer for the climb. He was later joined by ten other riders, with Johann Tschopp also being part of the group as he was looking to secure the mountains classification for IAM Cycling. Team Sky only allowed the breakaway to build up a lead of around three minutes due to the fact that another member of the breakaway, Arnold Jeannesson of FDJ, was only 1' 49" behind the race leader, Richie Porte. After taking second place points behind Silin on the first climb of the day, Tschopp proceeded to take maximum points at the remaining four climbs of the day's stage, guaranteeing himself an unassailable lead in the classification. With 64 points, Tschopp held a 40-point lead over Argos–Shimano's Thierry Hupond, with only ten points left to be taken at the finish of the following day's individual time trial at Col d'Èze, a first-category climb.

By the time the lead group was on the descent of the Col du Ferrier, only six members of the original eleven-rider lead group remained out front, and were only a minute clear of the peloton that was being led by the BMC Racing Team, Euskaltel–Euskadi and Team Sky. The breakaway was brought back by the main field prior to the day's second and final intermediate sprint point at Tourrettes-sur-Loup, with 34.5 km (21.4 mi) remaining of the stage. Astana's Andriy Hrivko as well as Omega Pharma–Quick-Step pairing Peter Velits and Sylvain Chavanel attacked prior to the sprint, to gain vital bonus seconds towards the general classification. The trio returned to the peloton after the sprint, and ultimately Team Sky manned the front of the main group towards the finish in Nice, to set up the bunch sprint of around sixty riders. Ag2r–La Mondiale and the BMC Racing Team moved towards the front for Samuel Dumoulin and Philippe Gilbert respectively, but Chavanel surprised both riders to take the sprint on the line. His result, a third stage win at Paris–Nice, gave him the lead in the points classification as well as moving him into third place overall, with ten bonus seconds.

Stage 6 Result

	Rider	Team	Time
1	Sylvain Chavanel (FRA)	Omega Pharma–Quick-Step	5h 14' 23"
2	Philippe Gilbert (BEL)	BMC Racing Team	s.t.
3	José Joaquín Rojas (ESP)	Movistar Team	s.t.
4	Samuel Dumoulin (FRA)	Ag2r–La Mondiale	s.t.
5	Tony Gallopin (FRA)	RadioShack–Leopard	s.t.
6	Julien Simon (FRA)	Sojasun	s.t.
7	Borut Božič (SLO)	Astana	s.t.
8	Heinrich Haussler (AUS)	IAM Cycling	s.t.
9	Jonathan Hivert (FRA)	Sojasun	s.t.
10	Alberto Losada (ESP)	Team Katusha	s.t.

General Classification after Stage 6

	Rider	Team	Time
1	Richie Porte (AUS)	Team Sky	29h 40' 31"
2	Andrew Talansky (USA)	Garmin–Sharp	+ 32"
3	Sylvain Chavanel (FRA)	Omega Pharma–Quick-Step	+ 42"
4	Lieuwe Westra (NED)	Vacansoleil–DCM	+ 42"
5	Jean-Christophe Péraud (FRA)	Ag2r–La Mondiale	+ 49"
6	Tejay van Garderen (USA)	BMC Racing Team	+ 52"
7	Peter Velits (SVK)	Omega Pharma–Quick-Step	+ 53"
8	Simon Špilak (SLO)	Team Katusha	+ 53"
9	Diego Ulissi (ITA)	Lampre–Merida	+ 54"
10	Andriy Hrivko (UKR)	Astana	+ 1' 06"

=== Stage 7 ===
10 March 2013 — Nice to Col d'Èze, 9.6 km (6.0 mi) (ITT)

For the second year in succession, the race concluded at Col d'Èze on the outskirts of Nice, with a mountainous individual time trial. The 9.6 km (6.0 mi) test against the clock began in Nice, with the steepest part of the climb coming in the early stages, reaching a gradient of 8.5% – against the average for the climb of 4.7% – in the second kilometre. The intermediate timing point came at the Col des Quatre Chemins, 4 km (2.5 mi) from the finish, with the final 1.5 km (0.9 mi) towards the summit of Col d'Èze were contested on a false flat. In 2012, the stage saw Bradley Wiggins and Lieuwe Westra battle it out for the general classification, with Wiggins winning the stage by two seconds and the race by eight seconds. As was customary of time trial stages, cyclists set off in reverse order from where they were ranked in the general classification at the end of the previous stage. Thus, Rick Flens of Blanco Pro Cycling, who, in 151st place, trailed overall leader Richie Porte (Team Sky) by one hour, twenty minutes and nine seconds, was the first rider to set off on the final stage.

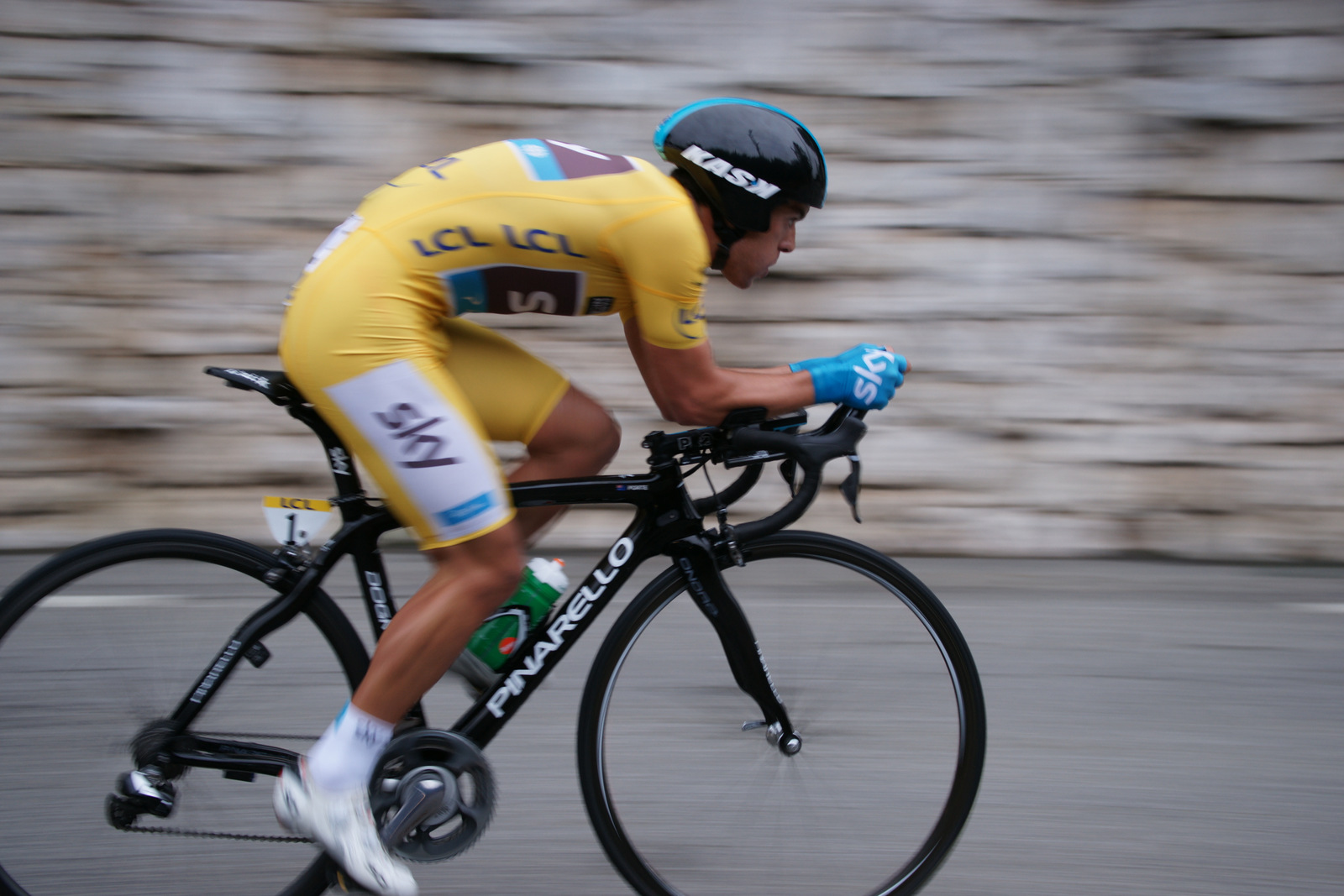
Team Sky's Richie Porte, in the leader's yellow jersey, won the final stage by 23 seconds over Garmin–Sharp rider Andrew Talansky. As a result, Porte won the race overall by 55 seconds ahead of Talansky.

Flens set the first benchmark with a time of 22' 35". Evaldas Šiškevičius of the Sojasun team was next to hold first place, going eleven seconds quicker than Flens, before prologue winner Damien Gaudin (Team Europcar) went fastest with a time of 22' 11". His lead was to last less than a minute as FDJ's Jérémy Roy went comfortably quicker than his time, more than a minute faster in a time of 20' 59". Roy held the best time for the best part of an hour before Lampre–Merida's Mattia Cattaneo knocked eight seconds off the benchmark. Javier Moreno (Movistar Team) also went quickest for a period of time before Jérôme Coppel – fifth on the climb in 2012 – moved top for Cofidis in a time of 20' 33". Ion Izagirre moved the best time nearer the 20-minute mark as he took another eleven seconds off the best time, before his time was usurped by Michele Scarponi, as the Lampre–Merida rider put in a solid performance and went top on 20' 19". The first of four sub 20-minute times was recorded by the Movistar Team's Nairo Quintana, setting a time of 19' 43", holding his pace all the way up the climb.

Quintana's time held into the later moments of the stage, as the top ten overall contenders hit the course. Simon Špilak (Team Katusha) had gone quicker to the intermediate point than Quintana, but faded in the second half of the stage, and was thus unable to match his fourth place of 2012. Quintana's time remained untouched until the final two riders to start the stage; much like 2012, the top two were to battle for victory, as Porte and Andrew Talansky of Garmin–Sharp were split by 32 seconds pre-stage. Talansky set the fastest intermediate split at the time, going six seconds quicker than Ag2r–La Mondiale's Jean-Christophe Péraud, but Porte passed the same point 21 seconds quicker than Talansky had done so. Péraud had faded to five seconds behind Quintana at the finish – despite falling at the start – and with slower times for those around in him the general classification, he sealed a place on the final podium. Talansky crossed the finish line with the fastest time, going four seconds quicker than Quintana with a time of 19' 39". However, Porte sealed victory in the race, and the stage itself, punching the air as he crossed the line in a time of 19' 16", four seconds slower than Wiggins' winning time of 2012.

Stage 7 Result

	Rider	Team	Time
1	Richie Porte (AUS)	Team Sky	19' 16"
2	Andrew Talansky (USA)	Garmin–Sharp	+ 23"
3	Nairo Quintana (COL)	Movistar Team	+ 27"
4	Jean-Christophe Péraud (FRA)	Ag2r–La Mondiale	+ 32"
5	Tejay van Garderen (USA)	BMC Racing Team	+ 52"
6	Simon Špilak (SLO)	Team Katusha	+ 55"
7	Diego Ulissi (ITA)	Lampre–Merida	+ 1' 00"
8	Michele Scarponi (ITA)	Lampre–Merida	+ 1' 03"
9	Sylvain Chavanel (FRA)	Omega Pharma–Quick-Step	+ 1' 05"
10	Ion Izagirre (ESP)	Euskaltel–Euskadi	+ 1' 06"

Final General Classification

	Rider	Team	Time
1	Richie Porte (AUS)	Team Sky	29h 59' 47"
2	Andrew Talansky (USA)	Garmin–Sharp	+ 55"
3	Jean-Christophe Péraud (FRA)	Ag2r–La Mondiale	+ 1' 21"
4	Tejay van Garderen (USA)	BMC Racing Team	+ 1' 44"
5	Sylvain Chavanel (FRA)	Omega Pharma–Quick-Step	+ 1' 47"
6	Simon Špilak (SLO)	Team Katusha	+ 1' 48"
7	Diego Ulissi (ITA)	Lampre–Merida	+ 1' 54"
8	Lieuwe Westra (NED)	Vacansoleil–DCM	+ 2' 17"
9	Andreas Klöden (GER)	RadioShack–Leopard	+ 2' 22"
10	Peter Velits (SVK)	Omega Pharma–Quick-Step	+ 2' 28"

== Classification leadership table ==
In the 2013 Paris–Nice, four different jerseys were awarded. For the general classification, calculated by adding each cyclist's finishing times on each stage, and allowing time bonuses for the first three finishers on mass-start stages, the leader received a yellow jersey. This classification was considered the most important of the 2013 Paris–Nice, and the winner of the classification was considered the winner of the race.

Additionally, there was a points classification, which awarded a green jersey. In the points classification, cyclists got points for finishing in the top 20 in a stage. Unlike in the better known points classification in the Tour de France, the type of stage had no effect on what points were on offer – each stage had the same points available on the same scale. The win earned 25 points, second place earned 22 points, third 20, fourth 18, fifth 16, and one point fewer per place down to a single point for 20th. In addition, points could be won in intermediate sprints; three points for crossing the sprint line first, two points for second place, and one for third.

There was also a mountains classification, the leadership of which was marked by a red and white polka-dot jersey. In the mountains classification, points were won by reaching the top of a climb before other cyclists. Each climb was categorised as either first, second, or third-category, with more points available for the higher-categorised climbs. For first-category climbs, points were awarded on a scale of 10 points for first across the climb, second place earned 8 points, third 6, fourth 4, and one point fewer per place down to a single point for seventh. Second-category climbs awarded points on a scale of 7 points for first place, second place earned 5 points, third 3, and one point fewer per place down to a single point for fifth. Third-category climbs, and the one fourth-category climb, awarded points to the top three riders only; 4 points for first across the climb, second place earned 2 points, third place earned 1 point.

The fourth jersey represented the young rider classification, marked by a white jersey. This was decided the same way as the general classification, but only riders born after 1 January 1988 were eligible to be ranked in the classification.

There was also a classification for teams, in which the times of the best three cyclists per team on each stage were added together; the leading team at the end of the race was the team with the lowest total time.

Stage	Winner	General Classification	Points Classification	Mountains Classification	Young Rider Classification	Team Classification
P	Damien Gaudin	Damien Gaudin	Damien Gaudin	not awarded	Wilco Kelderman	Omega Pharma–Quick-Step
1	Nacer Bouhanni	Nacer Bouhanni	Sylvain Chavanel	Bert-Jan Lindeman	Nacer Bouhanni	Omega Pharma–Quick-Step
2	Marcel Kittel	Elia Viviani	Elia Viviani	Bert-Jan Lindeman	Elia Viviani	Omega Pharma–Quick-Step
3	Andrew Talansky	Andrew Talansky	Elia Viviani	Martijn Keizer	Andrew Talansky	Astana
4	Michael Albasini	Andrew Talansky	Elia Viviani	Johann Tschopp	Andrew Talansky	Astana
5	Richie Porte	Richie Porte	Andrew Talansky	Johann Tschopp	Andrew Talansky	Team Katusha
6	Sylvain Chavanel	Richie Porte	Sylvain Chavanel	Johann Tschopp	Andrew Talansky	Team Katusha
7	Richie Porte	Richie Porte	Sylvain Chavanel	Johann Tschopp	Andrew Talansky	Team Katusha
Final		Richie Porte	Sylvain Chavanel	Johann Tschopp	Andrew Talansky	Team Katusha
