= Brent Bookwalter =

American racing cyclist (born 1984)

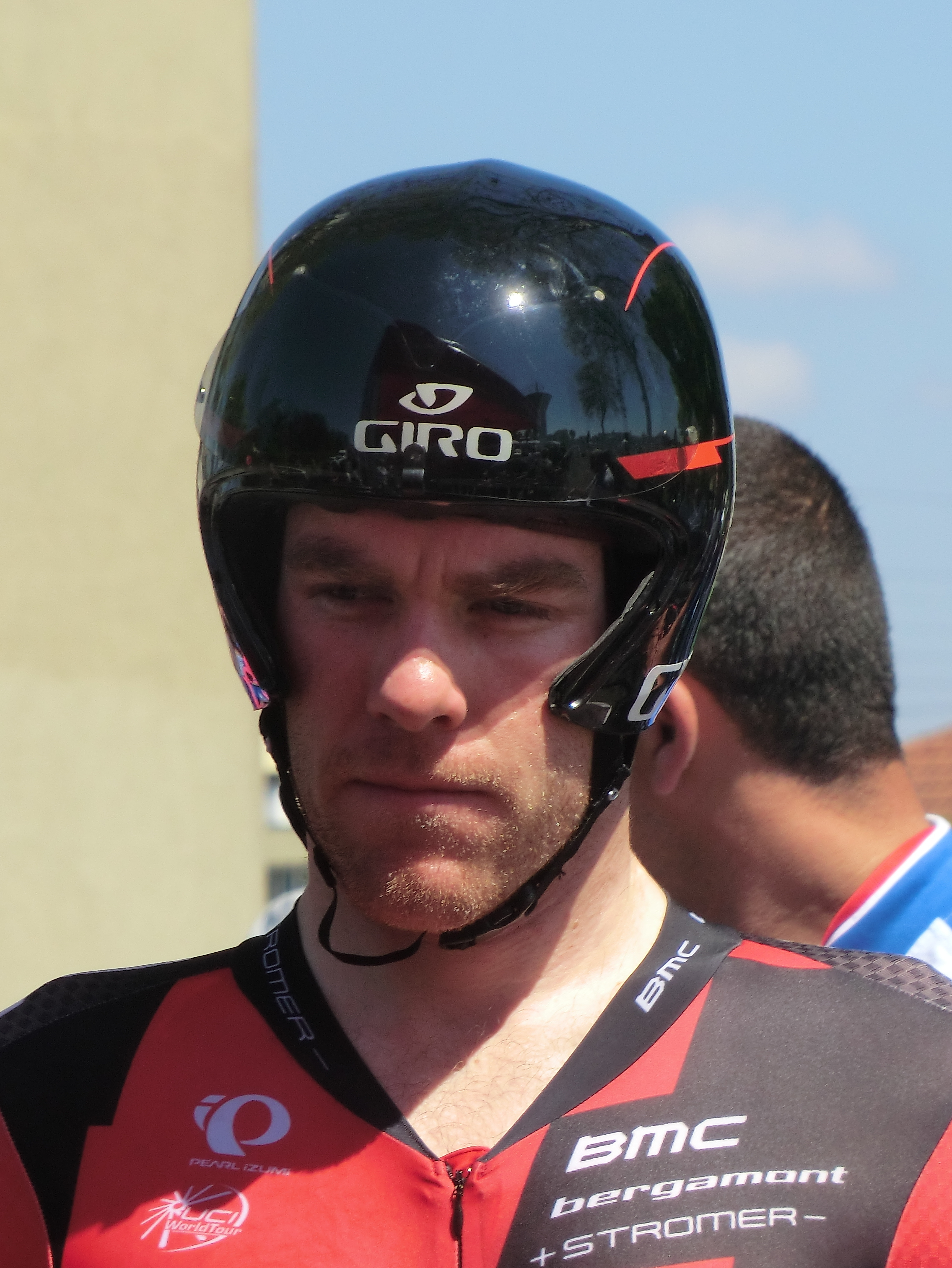
- Bookwalter at the 2013 Critérium du Dauphiné

Personal information
- Born: February 16, 1984 (age 42) Albuquerque, New Mexico, U.S.
- Height: 1.80 m (5 ft 11 in)
- Weight: 70 kg (154 lb)

Cycling career
- Sport: Cycling
- Current team: Retired
- Discipline: Road
- Role: Rider
- Rider type: Time trialist; Domestique

Amateur teams
- 2005–2006: Advantage Benefits–Endeavour
- 2007: USA Cycling National Development Team

Professional teams
- 2008–2018: BMC Racing Team
- 2019–2021: Mitchelton–Scott

Brent Bookwalter (born February 16, 1984) is an American former professional cyclist, who last rode for UCI WorldTeam Team BikeExchange.

== Career ==
Born in Albuquerque, New Mexico, United States, Bookwalter was a member of the Lees–McRae College (Banner Elk, NC) cycling team from 2003–2006. While a member they won 7 national titles as a team and Bookwalter won nine individual national titles in Mountain Bike, Road and Cyclo-Cross disciplines. He graduated from Lees-McRae in 2006 with a BS in Biology. Bookwalter was crowned United States national under-23 time trial champion the following year. In 2009 he won the prologue in the Tour of Utah.

He came to the attention of many cycling fans for the first time when he finished second behind Bradley Wiggins in the opening time trial at the 2010 Giro d'Italia.

He has competed at (amongst others) the 2010 Liège–Bastogne–Liège and the 2009 Critérium du Dauphiné Libéré. He also competed at the 2009 UCI Road World Championships in the Men's Road Race. Across his career he competed in seven UCI world championships. In addition he was part of the BMC squad that helped deliver Cadel Evans to victory in the 2011 Tour de France.

In 2013, Bookwalter won the first stage of the Tour of Qatar, which was marked by strong winds, creating breaks in the peloton. Bookwalter and two other riders escaped from the leading group with 11 kilometres (6.8 mi) to cover and successfully defended their lead, and Bookwalter outsprinted the pair. The chasers were on their heels as they crossed the line and were awarded the same time as him. A team time trial victory in stage two allowed Bookwalter to keep the yellow jersey through stage three before ultimately finishing in second overall to Mark Cavendish. Bookwalter would go on to finish runner-up in the U.S. National Time Trial and Road Race that spring as well as runner-up to Rohan Dennis in the inaugural Tour of Alberta.

In 2015, Bookwalter captured his first classification title by winning the points classification at the Tour of Utah, where he also finished on the overall podium. He won the second stage of the 2015 USA Pro Cycling Challenge, a mountaintop finish, to claim the yellow jersey which he would wear for two days before ultimately finishing second overall to teammate Rohan Dennis. The following year he would take another podium finish on home soil in the Tour of California. That year he would also compete for Team USA at the 2016 Summer Olympics in the road race and time trial.

Bookwalter joined Mitchelton–BikeExchange in 2019, where he took on the role of road captain, helping the team to stage victories in all three Grand Tours and taking a seventh place finish in the 2020 Strade Bianche. In June 2021 Bookwalter announced that he would retire from competition at the end of the season.

== Broadcasting career ==
In 2023, Bookwalter joined the team of broadcaster NBC for their coverage of the Tour de France, acting as a commentator,

== Major results ==
2005
2nd Time trial, National Under-23 Road Championships
2006
1st Time trial, National Under-23 Road Championships
2008
7th Tour de Leelanau
2009
1st Prologue Tour of Utah
2010
1st Fall Tour Invitational
2011
4th Time trial, National Road Championships
2012
3rd Time trial, National Road Championships
2013
National Road Championships

2nd Time trial
2nd Road race

2nd Overall Tour of Qatar

1st Stages 1 & 2 (TTT)

2nd Overall Tour of Alberta
2014
1st Stage 1 (TTT) Giro del Trentino
2015
2nd Overall USA Pro Cycling Challenge

1st Stage 2

3rd Overall Tour of Utah

1st Sprints classification

4th Overall Tour of Austria
7th Trofeo Laigueglia
2016
3rd Overall Tour of California
8th Overall Vuelta a Andalucía
2017
1st Stage 2 (TTT) Volta a Catalunya
2nd Time trial, National Road Championships
4th Overall Tour of California
4th Overall Tour de Yorkshire
5th Overall Tour of Utah

1st Stage 2

7th Overall Tour du Haut Var
7th Overall Colorado Classic
2018
1st Stage 3 (TTT) Volta a la Comunitat Valenciana
3rd Time trial, National Road Championships
4th Overall Tour of Utah
2019
1st Stage 1 (TTT) Tirreno–Adriatico
1st Stage 1 (TTT) Czech Cycling Tour
1st Stage 1b (TTT) Settimana Internazionale di Coppi e Bartali
8th Overall CRO Race
2020
7th Strade Bianche
2021
2nd Road race, National Road Championships

=== Grand Tour general classification results timeline ===
Grand Tour	2010	2011	2012	2013	2014	2015	2016	2017	2018	2019	2020
Giro d'Italia	95	—	—	—	68	66	—	—	—	DNF	DNF
Tour de France	147	114	—	91	—	—	117	—	—	—	—
Vuelta a España	—	—	78	—	—	—	—	—	66	—	—

Legend
—	Did not compete
DNF	Did not finish
