= Evan Huffman =

American road cyclist (born 1990)

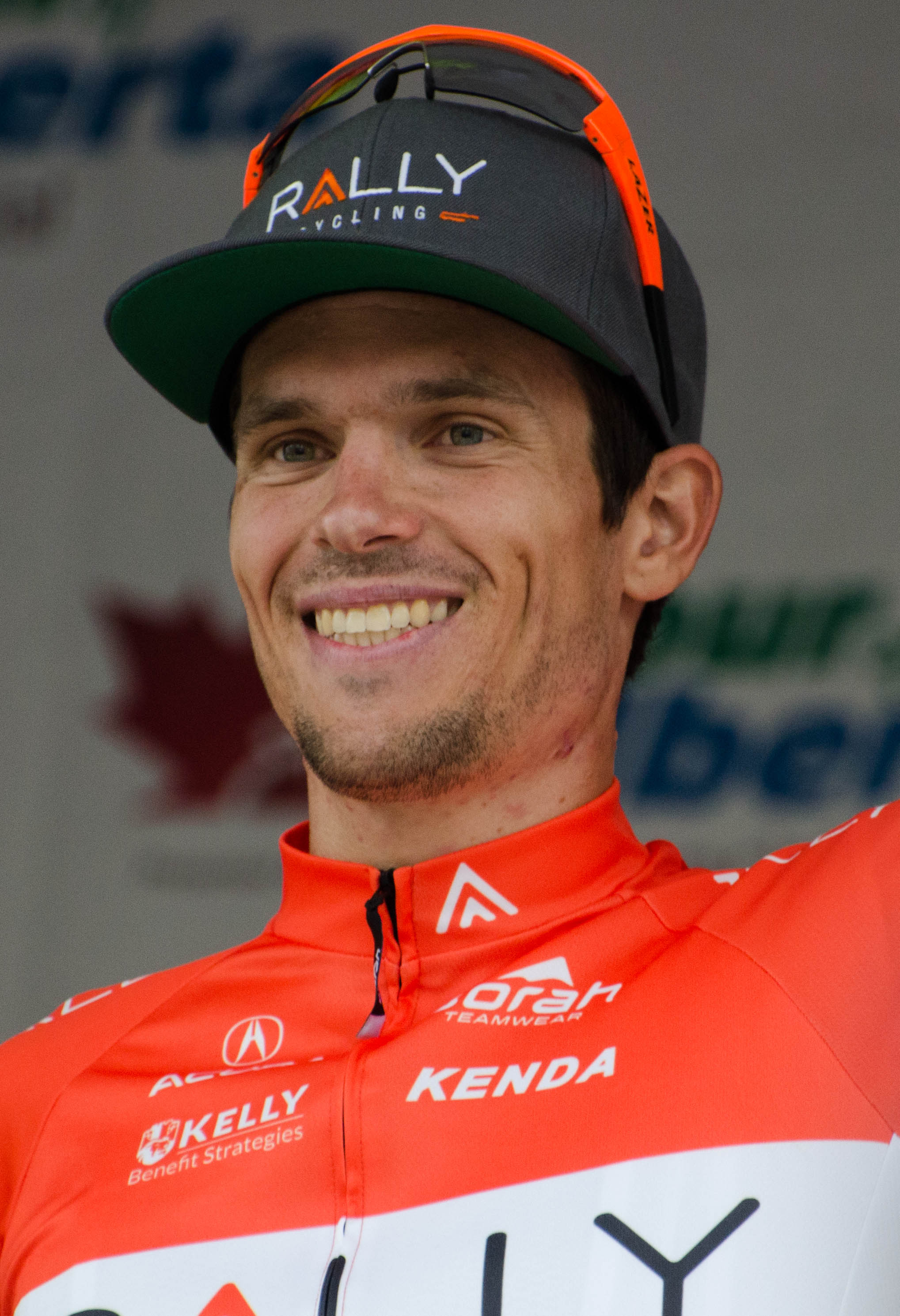
- Huffman at the 2016 Tour of Alberta

Personal information
- Full name: Evan Lukas Huffman
- Born: January 7, 1990 (age 36) Elk Grove, California, U.S.
- Height: 5 ft 9 in (175 cm)
- Weight: 156 lb (71 kg)

Cycling career
- Sport: Cycling
- Current team: Retired
- Discipline: Road
- Role: Rider
- Rider type: Rouleur; Time trialist

Amateur teams
- 2008: California Polytechnic State University
- 2011–2012: California Giant Berry–Specialized

Professional teams
- 2013–2014: Astana
- 2015: Team SmartStop
- 2016–2019: Rally Cycling

Evan Lukas Huffman (born January 7, 1990) is an American former professional cyclist, who rode professionally between 2013 and 2019 for the Astana, Team SmartStop and Rally UHC Cycling teams. His notable wins include the mountains classification at the 2016 Tour of California, and overall wins at the 2017 editions of the Tour of Alberta and the Tour of the Gila.

== Career ==
=== Early career ===
Huffman, a multi-sport athlete at Elk Grove High School in California, first competed in cycling in 2007 and rode for California Polytechnic State University the following year. He first attracted international attention with several time-trial victories and an under-age-23 national championship in 2012 while riding for the Cal-Giant team.

=== 2013–2015 ===
Greatly increasing his international experience, Huffman joined Astana, then the sport's No. 1-ranked WorldTour team, in 2013. His placement on the team was due in great part to the efforts of Specialized Bicycle Components. Going to Astana as the lone American and living in Europe while away from his home and family was difficult for him. Additionally, getting lost in the shuffle of a large team led to infrequent racing, few notable results, and returning to California without a contract for 2015. He then joined Team SmartStop which folded the same year.

=== 2016–2017 ===
Huffman rode for Rally Cycling in 2016 and had a breakthrough year culminating with earning the King of the Mountains jersey at the 2016 Tour of California. For Huffman, 2017 was a season unparalleled success for himself and for his team. He took first overall in the Tour of Alberta and the Tour of the Gila road races. In addition to winning stages 4 and 7 in the Tour of California, Huffman was twice awarded the Blue Jersey given to the most courageous rider at the end of each stage.

After the Tour of Alberta win, Huffman commented about his success: "I don't know what's better, two wins in California or the overall here. Earlier this year Tour of the Gila was the biggest before this, so I've just really shown a lot of progression in a short amount of time over the last two years with this team."

== Personal life ==
Huffman dons a tattoo on his inner forearms and another across his chest, all designations of his Christianity. On Huffman's left forearm is a tattoo that says "Truth" and on his right, "Grace." He added the tattoos at the end of 2014 when he returned to the United States from Europe; they remind him of why he rides, races and sacrifices. He married his wife Heather in October 2017, and resides in Northern California.

== Major results ==
2008
1st Road race, National Junior Road Championships
2011
2nd Nevada Classic
3rd Road race, National Under-23 Road Championships
2012
1st Time trial, National Under-23 Road Championships
1st Stage 3 (ITT) Tour of the Gila
1st Stage 2 (ITT) McLane Pacific Classic
2015
Vuelta a la Independencia Nacional

1st Mountains classification
1st Stage 3

8th Winston-Salem Cycling Classic
2016
1st Mountains classification Tour of California
3rd Overall Tour of Alberta

1st Stage 4

3rd Winston-Salem Cycling Classic
6th The Reading 120
2017
1st Overall Tour of Alberta

1st Stage 1

1st Overall Tour of the Gila

1st Stage 3 (ITT)

Tour of California

1st Stages 4 & 7

3rd Overall Cascade Cycling Classic

1st Stage 2 (ITT)

5th Overall Joe Martin Stage Race
