= Andrew Talansky =

American racing cyclist

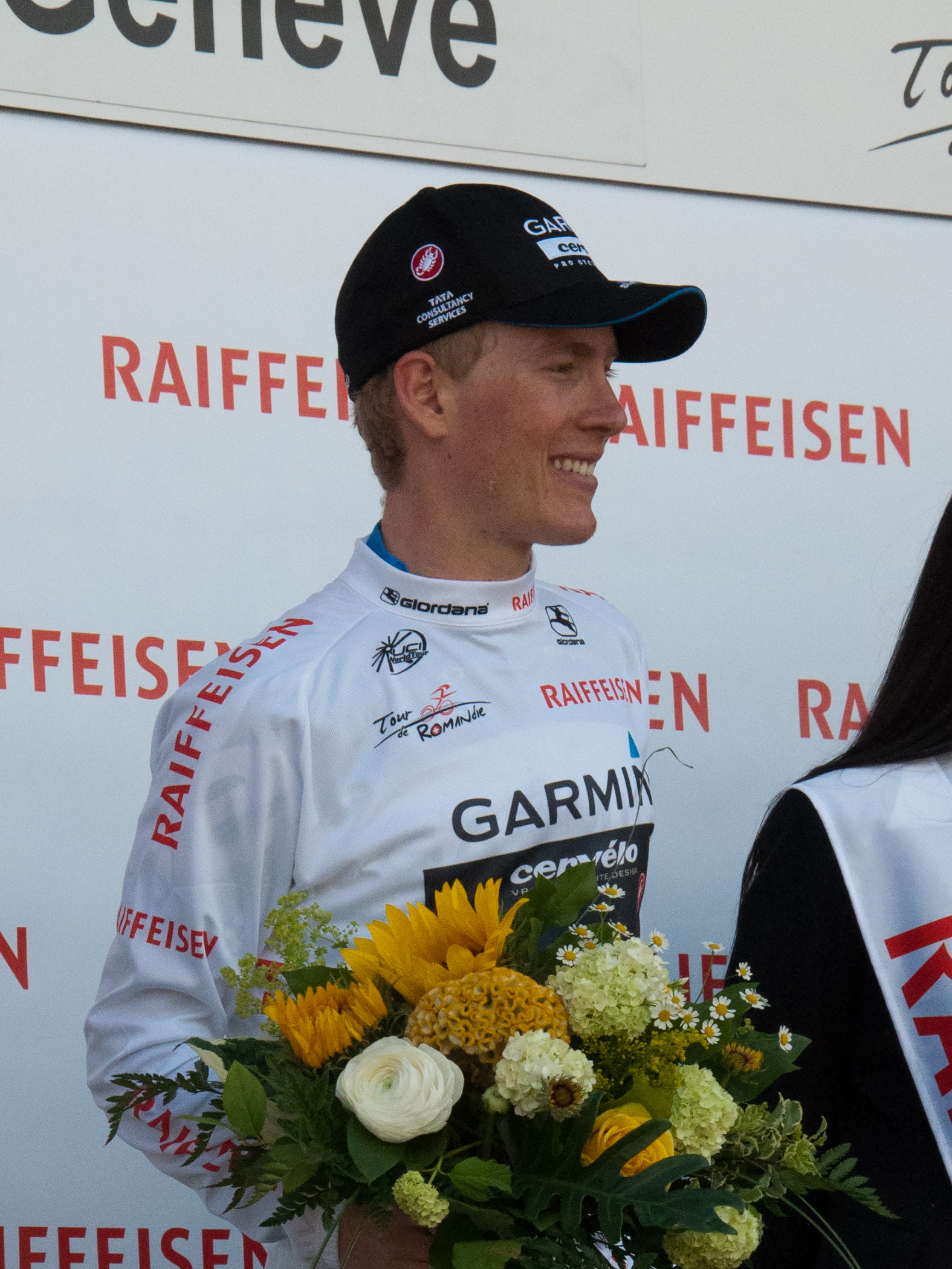
- Talansky at the 2011 Tour de Romandie

Personal information
- Nickname: Pit Bull
- Born: November 23, 1988 (age 37) Manhattan, New York, U.S.
- Height: 1.75 m (5 ft 9 in)
- Weight: 63 kg (139 lb)

Cycling career
- Sport: Cycling
- Discipline: Road
- Role: Rider
- Rider type: All-rounder

Amateur teams
- 2005–2006: Laser-es
- 2007–2008: Herbalife–bikeam.com
- 2010: Garmin–Transitions (stagiaire)

Professional teams
- 2009: Amore & Vita–McDonald's
- 2010: Giant Berry Farm–Specialized
- 2011–2017: Garmin–Cervélo

Major wins
- Stage races Critérium du Dauphiné (2014) One-day races and Classics National Time Trial Championships (2015)

Andrew Talansky (born November 23, 1988) is a former professional cyclist. Between 2011 and 2017, he competed for Garmin–Cervélo on the UCI World Tour, cycling's highest road racing category.

== Early life and education ==
Talansky was born in Manhattan, New York City, and grew up in Key Biscayne, Florida, near Miami.

Talansky competed in cross-country running at high school in Florida before taking up competitive cycling at age 17. After success in local amateur races, he moved to Lees–McRae College in Banner Elk, North Carolina, winning the collegiate national championship race in his freshman year.

== Career ==
In 2009, he left college after one year to join the Amore & Vita–McDonald's team in Italy, but found the conditions unsatisfactory and returned to the US that spring. He raced in the US in 2009 without team support. After a strong ride at the Tour of the Gila race, he joined Garmin for the 2010 season, moving up to the professional team for 2011, where he made the top ten at the 2011 Tour de Romandie.

In 2012, Talansky scored his first professional victory in Europe at the Tour de l'Ain, and again rode the Tour de Romandie. This time he finished second overall behind Bradley Wiggins, having finished second to Wiggins on the final stage, a 16.24-kilometre (10.09-mile) individual time trial. Later in the season he was named Garmin's lead rider for the Vuelta a España, finishing seventh in the general classification. In 2013, he came second in Paris–Nice, having led the race for two days, and was selected for the Tour de France for the first time, again making the top ten overall.

He won the 2014 Critérium du Dauphiné, joining a high-quality breakaway group on the final stage to overcome a 39-second deficit to overnight race leader Alberto Contador. He retired from the 2014 Tour de France after a very uncomfortable day on his bike, due to multiple crashes. The broom wagon was following him at the end of the stage. He returned to the Tour de France in 2015, finishing eleventh overall. The following year he once again contested the Tour de Romandie, but rode in support of Rigoberto Urán and Pierre Rolland. Later in the season, he took fifth-place overall finishes at the Tour de Suisse and the Vuelta a España.

In September 2017 Talansky announced his retirement from competition via an Instagram post. However, the following month he indicated that he had "un-retired" and would take up competing in triathlon. He permanently retired from professional endurance sport at the end of the 2019 season after competing in his final Ironman in Chattanooga, TN.

== Major results ==
2008
1st Road race, National Collegiate Road Championships
2010
1st Time trial, National Under-23 Road Championships
1st Stage 2 Tour des Pays de Savoie
2nd Overall Tour de l'Avenir
3rd Overall Ronde de l'Isard
6th Overall Tour of the Gila
10th Overall Giro della Valle d'Aosta
2011
4th Overall Tour Méditerranéen
9th Overall Tour de Romandie

1st Young rider classification

2012 (2 pro wins)
1st Overall Tour de l'Ain

1st Points classification
1st Stage 4

2nd Overall Tour de Romandie

1st Young rider classification

7th Overall Vuelta a España
8th Overall Volta ao Algarve
2013 (1)
2nd Overall Paris–Nice

1st Young rider classification
1st Stage 3

6th Overall Critérium International
10th Overall Tour de France
2014 (1)
1st Overall Critérium du Dauphiné
7th Overall Volta a Catalunya
2015 (1)
1st Time trial, National Road Championships
10th Overall Critérium du Dauphiné
2016 (1)
3rd Overall Tour of Utah

1st Stage 6

4th Overall Tour of California
5th Overall Vuelta a España
5th Overall Tour de Suisse
2017 (1)
3rd Overall Tour of California

1st Stage 5

=== Grand Tour general classification results timeline ===
Grand Tour	2011	2012	2013	2014	2015	2016	2017
Giro d'Italia	Did not contest during his career						
Tour de France	—	—	10	DNF	11	—	49
Vuelta a España	79	7	—	51	DNF	5	—
Major stage race general classification results
Major stage race	2011	2012	2013	2014	2015	2016	2017
Paris–Nice	61	—	2	—	50	DNF	—
Tirreno–Adriatico	—	120	—	17	—	—	—
Volta a Catalunya	—	—	—	7	31	—	DNF
Tour of the Basque Country	97	—	29	—	49	—	DNF
Tour de Romandie	9	2	16	11	—	105	—
Critérium du Dauphiné	—	—	28	1	10	—	22
Tour de Suisse	DNF	—	—	—	—	5	—

Legend
—	Did not compete
DNF	Did not finish
