= 2010 Tour of Utah =

U.S. national tour

Race details
- Dates: August 17–22, 2010
- Stages: 6
- Winning time: 12h 39' 40"

Results
Jersey awarded to the overall winner	Winner	Levi Leipheimer (USA)	(Mellow Johnny's)
	Second	Francisco Mancebo (ESP)	(Canyon Bicycles)
	Third	Ian Boswell (USA)	(Bissell)
Jersey awarded to the mountains classification winner	Mountains	Jai Crawford (AUS)	(Fly V Australia)
Jersey awarded to the youth classification winner	Youth	Ian Boswell (USA)	(Bissell)
Jersey awarded to the sprints classification winner	Sprints	David Tanner (AUS)	(Fly V Australia)
	Team	Fly V Australia	

The 2010 Tour of Utah was the seventh edition of the Tour of Utah. It was held August 17-22, 2010. The race was distinguished by the decision of the organizers prior to the race to submit the 2011 edition of the race for addition to the UCI America Tour, upgrading it from national status to international status. Although UCI Pro Tour team were not allowed to compete in the race, Levi Leipheimer of Team RadioShack, who had just won the Leadville Trail 100 MTB mountain-bike race in Colorado, raced as the sole member of a team sponsored by Lance Armstrong's Austin bicycle shop, Mellow Johnny's, and won the overall title. Consistent with its self-proclaimed title of "America's toughest stage race", only 71 of the original 140 starters finished the race.

== Stages ==
Like 2009, the 2010 race had a prologue, three road stages, a criterium and a time trial. In addition to Leipheimer, Taylor Phinney, who was a stagiaire at RadioShack at the time, entered as part of RadioShack's U23 team Trek-Livestrong. Only one UCI Professional Continental team, BMC Racing Team, competed in the race, along with several UCI Continental teams, some national teams and a few entries like Mellow Johnny's. In total, 140 riders began the race.

Leipheimer won alone on stage 2, came in second on stage 3 and second in a two-man finish on stage 5 to beat the previous year's winner, Francisco Mancebo, by 2:30. 19-year-old Ian Boswell from Bissell came in a surprising third and was also Best Young Rider; after the race, he joined Trek-Livestrong as well. The only riders to wear the yellow jersey in the race were affiliated with RadioShack: Phinney (after the Prologue), Trek-Livestrong's Alex Dowsett (after Stage One), and Leipheimer (remainder).

=== Prologue ===
August 17, 2010 -- Salt Lake City, 2.8 miles (4.5 km)
The prologue, a loop around the State Capitol in Salt Lake City, was identical to the previous year's prologue. This time, it was dominated by Phinney and Dowsett from Trek-Livestrong, with Brent Bookwalter, the 2009 winner of the prologue, coming in third.

Prologue Result

	Rider	Team	Time
1	Taylor Phinney (USA)	Trek-Livestrong	6' 02"
2	Alex Dowsett (GBR)	Trek-Livestrong	+ 3"
3	Brent Bookwalter (USA)	BMC Racing Team	+ 11"
4	Rory Sutherland (AUS)	UnitedHealthcare–Maxxis	+ 12"
5	Bobby Lea (USA)	On the Rivet-Ion	+ 13"
6	Benjamin Jacques-Maynes (USA)	Bissell	+ 14"
7	Jeff Louder (USA)	BMC Racing Team	+ 15"
8	George Hincapie (USA)	BMC Racing Team	+ 16"
9	Jeremy Vennell (NZL)	Bissell	s.t.
10	Levi Leipheimer (USA)	Mellow Johnny's	+ 18"

General Classification after Prologue

	Rider	Team	Time
1	Taylor Phinney (USA)	Trek-Livestrong	6' 02"
2	Alex Dowsett (GBR)	Trek-Livestrong	+ 3"
3	Brent Bookwalter (USA)	BMC Racing Team	+ 11"
4	Rory Sutherland (AUS)	UnitedHealthcare–Maxxis	+ 12"
5	Bobby Lea (USA)	On the Rivet-Ion	+ 13"
6	Benjamin Jacques-Maynes (USA)	Bissell	+ 14"
7	Jeff Louder (USA)	BMC Racing Team	+ 15"
8	George Hincapie (USA)	BMC Racing Team	+ 16"
9	Jeremy Vennell (NZL)	Bissell	s.t.
10	Levi Leipheimer (USA)	Mellow Johnny's	+ 18"

=== Stage 1 ===
August 18, 2010 -- Ogden to Salt Lake City, 82 miles (132 km)
Stage 1 presented a flat, hot finish that was likely to end up in a bunch sprint. However, two of the leaders, David Tanner of Fly V Australia and Alex Dowsett of Trek-Livestrong, managed to break away on the last descent and hang on to beat the pack by 26 seconds, giving Dowsett the overall lead after time bonuses. Seven riders failed to complete the stage, and two riders were time-cut after this stage, leaving 131 riders still competing.

Stage 1 Result

	Rider	Team	Time
1	David Tanner (AUS)	Fly V Australia	3h 22' 11"
2	Alex Dowsett (GBR)	Trek-Livestrong	s.t.
3	Javier Mejías (ESP)	Team Type 1	+ 26"
4	Caleb Fairly (USA)	Holowesko Partners	s.t.
5	Frank Pipp (USA)	Bissell	s.t.
6	Rory Sutherland (AUS)	UnitedHealthcare–Maxxis	s.t.
7	Scott Stewart (USA)	Team Type 1	s.t.
8	George Hincapie (USA)	BMC Racing Team	s.t.
9	Tyler Wren (USA)	Jamis–Sutter Home	s.t.
10	Cesar Grajales (COL)	On the Rivet-Ion	s.t.

General Classification after Stage 1

	Rider	Team	Time
1	Alex Dowsett (GBR)	Trek-Livestrong	3h 28' 16"
2	David Tanner (AUS)	Fly V Australia	+ 11"
3	Brent Bookwalter (USA)	BMC Racing Team	+ 40"
4	Rory Sutherland (AUS)	UnitedHealthcare–Maxxis	+ 41"
5	Jeff Louder (USA)	BMC Racing Team	+ 44"
6	George Hincapie (USA)	BMC Racing Team	+ 45"
7	Levi Leipheimer (USA)	Mellow Johnny's	+ 47"
8	Francisco Mancebo (ESP)	Canyon Bicycles	+ 48"
9	Cesar Grajales (COL)	On the Rivet-Ion	+ 50"
10	Jason Donald (USA)	Team Rio Grande	s.t.

=== Stage 2 ===
August 19, 2010 -- Thanksgiving Point to Mount Nebo, 77 miles (124 km)
Stage 2 started in the Salt Lake City suburb of Thanksgiving Point and ended with a mountaintop finish above 9,000 feet on Mount Nebo, the highest peak in the Wasatch Range. A select group of six riders broke away from the pack on the final ascent, but Leipheimer than pedaled away from the selection for the stage win and the overall lead. Four riders dropped out, and 8 riders were time-cut, leaving 119 riders still competing.

Stage 2 Result

	Rider	Team	Time
1	Levi Leipheimer (USA)	Mellow Johnny's	3h 11' 43"
2	Francisco Mancebo (ESP)	Canyon Bicycles	+ 51"
3	Ian Boswell (USA)	Bissell	s.t.
4	Darren Lill (RSA)	Fly V Australia	+ 1' 00"
5	Philip Zajicek (USA)	Fly V Australia	+ 1' 18"
6	Jonathan McCarty (USA)	Team Rio Grande	+ 2' 00"
7	Maxim Jenkins (USA)	UnitedHealthcare–Maxxis	s.t.
8	Tyler Wren (USA)	Jamis–Sutter Home	s.t.
9	Cesar Grajales (COL)	On the Rivet-Ion	s.t.
10	Tim Roe (AUS)	Trek-Livestrong	s.t.

General Classification after Stage 2

	Rider	Team	Time
1	Levi Leipheimer (USA)	Mellow Johnny's	6h 40' 36"
2	Francisco Mancebo (ESP)	Canyon Bicycles	+ 56"
3	Darren Lill (RSA)	Fly V Australia	+ 1' 16"
4	Ian Boswell (USA)	Bissell	s.t.
5	Philip Zajicek (USA)	Fly V Australia	+ 1' 34"
6	Cesar Grajales (COL)	On the Rivet-Ion	+ 2' 13"
7	Jonathan McCarty (USA)	Team Rio Grande	+ 2' 17"
8	Tim Roe (AUS)	Trek-Livestrong	+ 2' 20"
9	Brent Bookwalter (USA)	BMC Racing Team	+ 2' 24"
10	Tyler Wren (USA)	Jamis–Sutter Home	+ 2' 26"

=== Stage 3 ===
August 20, 2010 -- Miller Motorsports Park, individual time trial, 9.2 miles (14.8 km)
Stage 3 started about a half-hour late due to the high temperatures around the racetrack, which finally started to cool off by the race's actual start time of 6:30 PM. In a repeat of the prologue, Taylor Phinney claimed the victory, this time by edging Leipheimer. Phinney, Leipheimer and third-place finisher Jeremy Vennell all surpassed Tom Zirbel's winning time from the 2009 Tour individual time trial, run on the identical course, which was 14 seconds slower than Phinney's time.

Stage 3 Result

	Rider	Team	Time
1	Taylor Phinney (USA)	Trek-Livestrong	16' 46"
2	Levi Leipheimer (USA)	Mellow Johnny's	+ 2"
3	Jeremy Vennell (NZL)	Bissell	+ 11"
4	Alex Dowsett (GBR)	Trek-Livestrong	+ 16"
5	Brent Bookwalter (USA)	BMC Racing Team	+ 18"
6	Benjamin Jacques-Maynes (USA)	Bissell	+ 24"
7	Darren Lill (RSA)	Fly V Australia	+ 35"
8	Philip Zajicek (USA)	Fly V Australia	s.t.
9	Daniel Summerhill (USA)	Holowesko Partners	+ 41"
10	Francisco Mancebo (ESP)	Canyon Bicycles	+ 43"

General Classification after Stage 3

	Rider	Team	Time
1	Levi Leipheimer (USA)	Mellow Johnny's	6h 57' 24"
2	Francisco Mancebo (ESP)	Canyon Bicycles	+ 1' 37"
3	Darren Lill (RSA)	Fly V Australia	+ 1' 49"
4	Philip Zajicek (USA)	Fly V Australia	+ 2' 07"
5	Ian Boswell (USA)	Bissell	+ 2' 29"
6	Brent Bookwalter (USA)	BMC Racing Team	+ 2' 40"
7	Cesar Grajales (COL)	On the Rivet-Ion	+ 3' 05"
8	Tim Roe (AUS)	Trek-Livestrong	+ 3' 17"
9	Jonathan McCarty (USA)	Team Rio Grande	+ 3' 27"
10	Rory Sutherland (AUS)	UnitedHealthcare–Maxxis	+ 3' 34"

=== Stage 4 ===
August 21, 2010 -- Park City, 75 minutes
Stage 4, the Park City Criterium, was measured by time instead of distance. The riders circled a one-mile loop with a 10% grade at 7,000 feet for 75 minutes. Because of the uncertain length, the riders tried to close any breaks down before they could become established. The high speeds and high altitude wreaked havoc on the field, as 33 riders dropped out, leaving just 86 riders remaining. Former Tour of Utah champion Jeff Louder of the BMC Racing Team, a Utah native who was over five minutes down in the overall standings, managed to break away without being chased down by the field for a 22-second victory.

Stage 4 Result

	Rider	Team	Time
1	Jeff Louder (USA)	BMC Racing Team	1h 14' 45"
2	Jai Crawford (AUS)	Fly V Australia	+ 22"
3	Francisco Mancebo (ESP)	Canyon Bicycles	s.t.
4	Davide Frattini (ITA)	Team Type 1	+ 27"
5	Benjamin Jacques-Maynes (USA)	Bissell	s.t.
6	Frank Pipp (USA)	Bissell	s.t.
7	Brent Bookwalter (USA)	BMC Racing Team	s.t.
8	Christopher Jones (USA)	Team Type 1	s.t.
9	Levi Leipheimer (USA)	Mellow Johnny's	s.t.
10	Darrel Lill (RSA)	Fly V Australia	s.t.

General Classification after Stage 4

	Rider	Team	Time
1	Levi Leipheimer (USA)	Mellow Johnny's	8h 12' 36"
2	Francisco Mancebo (ESP)	Canyon Bicycles	+ 1' 28"
3	Darren Lill (RSA)	Fly V Australia	+ 1' 49"
4	Philip Zajicek (USA)	Fly V Australia	+ 2' 07"
5	Ian Boswell (USA)	Bissell	+ 2' 29"
6	Brent Bookwalter (USA)	BMC Racing Team	+ 2' 40"
7	Cesar Grajales (COL)	On the Rivet-Ion	+ 3' 05"
8	Jonathan McCarty (USA)	Team Rio Grande	+ 3' 27"
9	Lachlan Morton (AUS)	Holowesko Partners	+ 3' 41"
10	Tyler Wren (USA)	Jamis–Sutter Home	+ 3' 45"

=== Stage 5 ===
August 22, 2010 -- Kimball Junction to Snowbird, 161 kilometres (100 mi)
The final stage of the 2010 Tour, Stage 5, began from Kimball Junction, just outside Park City, and trekked for 161 km through the mountains until ending on a mountaintop finish at the Snowbird ski resort. Leipheimer and Fly V Australia's Jai Crawford broke away from the rest of the elite riders to win the stage by a minute over defending champion Francisco Mancebo, who finished second behind Leipheimer in the general classification. By winning the stage, Crawford won the "King of the Mountains" jersey for the event. After another 15 people failed to finish this stage, the race ended with only 71 of the original 140 contestants (50.7%).

Stage 5 Result

	Rider	Team	Time
1	Jai Crawford (AUS)	Fly V Australia	4h 27' 10"
2	Levi Leipheimer (USA)	Mellow Johnny's	s.t.
3	Francisco Mancebo (ESP)	Canyon Bicycles	1' 00"
4	Alex Hagman (USA)	On the Rivet-Ion	s.t.
5	Jonathan McCarty (USA)	Team Rio Grande	+ 1' 03"
6	Ben King (AUS)	Trek-Livestrong	+ 1' 21"
7	Lachlan Morton (AUS)	Holowesko Partners	s.t.
8	Ian Boswell (USA)	Bissell	s.t.
9	Matthew Cooke (USA)	Teamgive	+ 2' 18"
10	Davide Frattini (ITA)	Team Type 1	+ 2' 28"

Final General Classification

	Rider	Team	Time
1	Levi Leipheimer (USA)	Mellow Johnny's	12h 39' 40"
2	Francisco Mancebo (ESP)	Canyon Bicycles	+ 2' 30"
3	Ian Boswell (USA)	Bissell	+ 3' 56"
4	Jai Crawford (AUS)	Fly V Australia	+ 3' 56"
5	Darren Lill (RSA)	Fly V Australia	+ 4' 32"
6	Jonathan McCarty (USA)	Team Rio Grande	+ 4' 36"
7	Lachlan Morton (AUS)	Holowesko Partners	+ 5' 08"
8	Alex Hagman (USA)	On the Rivet-Ion	+ 5' 48"
9	Cesar Grajales (COL)	On the Rivet-Ion	+ 6' 56"
10	Tyler Wren (USA)	Jamis–Sutter Home	+ 7' 07"

== Overall ==
Stage	Date	Route	Winner	Overall leader
Prologue	Tuesday, August 17	Salt Lake City	Taylor Phinney (USA)	Taylor Phinney (USA)
1	Wednesday, August 18	Ogden to Salt Lake City	David Tanner (AUS)	Alex Dowsett (GBR)
2	Thursday, August 19	Thanksgiving Point to Mount Nebo	Levi Leipheimer (USA)	Levi Leipheimer (USA)
3	Friday, August 20	Miller Motorsports Park	Taylor Phinney (USA)	Levi Leipheimer (USA)
4	Saturday, August 21	Park City	Jeff Louder (USA)	Levi Leipheimer (USA)
5	Sunday, August 22	Kimball Junction (Park City) to Snowbird	Jai Crawford (AUS)	Levi Leipheimer (USA)
