= 2010 Tour of California =

UCI America Tour
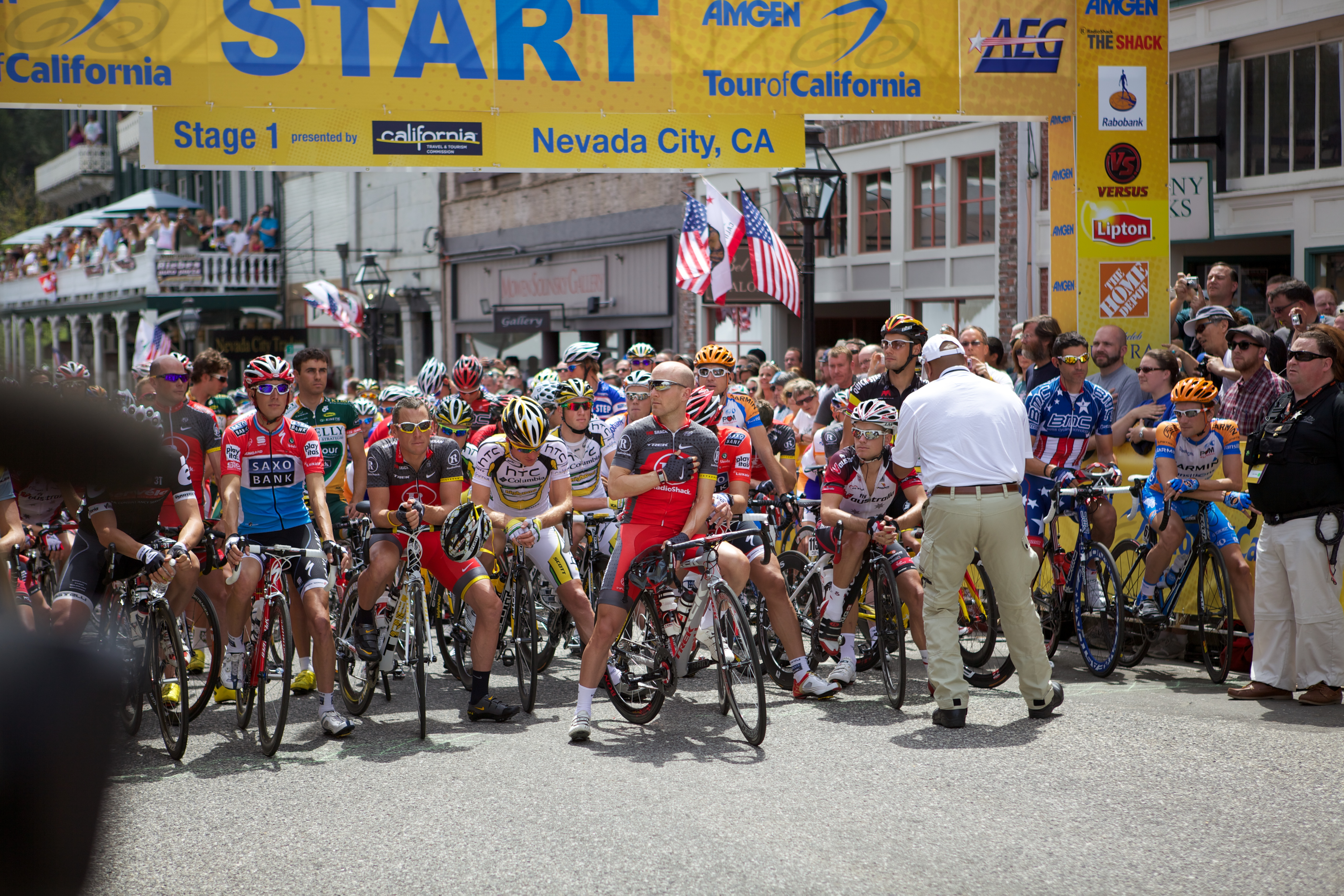
- The start of the race in Nevada City

Race details
- Dates: May 16–23, 2010
- Stages: 8
- Distance: 810 mi (1,304 km)
- Winning time: 33h 08' 30"

Results
Jersey awarded to the overall winner	Winner	Michael Rogers (AUS)	(Team HTC–Columbia)
	Second	David Zabriskie (USA)	(Garmin–Transitions)
	Third	Levi Leipheimer (USA)	(Team RadioShack)
Jersey awarded to the mountains classification winner	Mountains	Thomas Rabou (NED)	(Team Type 1)
Jersey awarded to the youth classification winner	Youth	Peter Sagan (SVK)	(Liquigas–Doimo)
Jersey awarded to the sprints classification winner	Sprints	Peter Sagan (SVK)	(Liquigas–Doimo)
	Team	Garmin–Transitions	

The 2010 Tour of California was the fifth running of the Tour of California cycling stage race. It was held from May 16–23, and was the first edition of the race held in the month of May, after the first four occurred in February. It was rated as a 2.HC event on the UCI America Tour. It began in Nevada City and concluded in the Agoura Hills.

The event's move to later in the year has made it so the route was different from previous editions of the race, and also provided for a different makeup of ridership, as it conflicted with the 2010 Giro d'Italia.

The race was won by Team HTC–Columbia rider Michael Rogers, who held off Garmin–Transitions' David Zabriskie and Levi Leipheimer of Team RadioShack. In other classifications, Liquigas–Doimo's Peter Sagan won both the points and young rider classifications, Thomas Rabou of Team Type 1 won the mountains classification and Garmin-Transitions won the teams classification.

== Participating teams ==
Sixteen teams participated in the Tour of California. These included seven UCI ProTour teams, two UCI Professional Continental teams, and seven UCI Continental teams. They were:

UCI ProTour Teams

- GRM – Garmin–Transitions
- LIQ – Liquigas–Doimo
- QST – Quick-Step
- RAB – Rabobank
- THR – Team HTC–Columbia
- RSH – Team RadioShack
- SAX – Team Saxo Bank

UCI Professional Continental Teams

- BMC – BMC Racing Team
- CTT – Cervélo TestTeam

UCI Continental Teams

- BPC – Bissell
- FAS – Fly V Australia
- JBC – Jelly Belly–Kenda
- KBS – Kelly Benefit Strategies
- CSM – SpiderTech-Planet Energy
- TT1 – Team Type 1
- UHC – UnitedHealthcare–Maxxis

Team RadioShack's Levi Leipheimer returned, to try for a fourth consecutive overall victory. Leipheimer's teammate Lance Armstrong has also committed to the race, as has George Hincapie, riding in 2010 for BMC Racing Team. Garmin–Transitions rider David Zabriskie, second-place finisher in 2006 and 2009, has also been announced for the race.

== Changes from 2009 ==
The 2010 Tour was the first to take place in May rather than February. This has allowed race organizers to move the race inland from the coastal route it used in its four editions. This eliminated Solvang, which had hosted an individual time trial in each of the last three editions of the race, from the route, along with other past cities. Moving to May allowed the race to visit some taller, more difficult climbs further inland, which were too cold to visit in February. Andrew Messick, president of Anschutz Entertainment Group (the organizers of the race), has said that the route for the 2010 Tour will be more difficult than it was in 2009, and that the May time position also moves them from cycling's "pre-season" and gives a better chance to showcase the race, as it now takes place at a time when more riders should be at or near peak form. Race officials also hoped to make the event a preparatory one for the Tour de France.

The race was held at the same time of year as the Giro d'Italia. Messick has admitted that this will probably result in fewer Italians starting this race, and fewer Americans in the Giro. However, the consensus among race organizers was that few riders who seek a high position in the Tour de France also ride the Giro d'Italia, so the possible loss of riders such as Carlos Sastre and Mark Cavendish (who rode the Tour of California, the Giro d'Italia, and the Tour de France in 2009) was not seen as a major risk.

== Tour stages ==
The 2010 Tour was held over eight days, down from nine in 2009. This change is due to the current economic state after the recession of the last several years. The prologue has been eliminated.

=== Stage 1 ===
May 16, 2010 — Nevada City to Sacramento, 104.3 miles (167.9 km)

While past editions of the Tour of California began with a prologue time trial, the first stage in 2010 was a road race from Nevada City to the state capital Sacramento. The course consisted of a lot of descending, starting at 2,500 feet (760 m) and ending near sea level with three laps of a circuit in Sacramento, and a mass sprint finish the expectation.

A four-rider breakaway took the intermediate sprints and the one small climb on the course. The riders in the break were Maarten Tjallingii, Marc de Maar, Paul Mach, and Chad Beyer. A chase group, with a rider each from Jelly Belly–Kenda, Team Type 1, and Fly V Australia was between the leaders and the peloton for several miles of racing, but were unable to make the bridge. They attained a maximum advantage of close to six minutes, but Team HTC–Columbia at the head of the peloton did not let them stay away. The catch occurred shortly before the circuits in Sacramento began. Team HTC-Columbia continued to control the race during the circuits in preparation for Mark Cavendish's sprint, except for a brief moment when Team Saxo Bank appeared at the head of the peloton to try to set up Juan José Haedo. Crashes depleted the leading group and reduced the number of sprinters present to try for the stage win, though all riders were given the same time as stage winner Cavendish since the crashes took place very close to the finish line on a flat stage. Time bonuses won during the stage meant the first general classification was not the same as the results of stage one.

Stage 1 Result

	Rider	Team	Time
1	Mark Cavendish (GBR)	Team HTC–Columbia	4h 04' 46"
2	Juan José Haedo (ARG)	Team Saxo Bank	s.t.
3	Alexander Kristoff (NOR)	BMC Racing Team	s.t.
4	Robert Hunter (RSA)	Garmin–Transitions	s.t.
5	Jonathan Cantwell (AUS)	Fly V Australia	s.t.
6	Marcus Burghardt (GER)	BMC Racing Team	s.t.
7	Guillaume Boivin (CAN)	SpiderTech-Planet Energy	s.t.
8	Andreas Stauff (GER)	Quick-Step	s.t.
9	Nikolas Maes (BEL)	Quick-Step	s.t.
10	Tom Leezer (NED)	Rabobank	s.t.

General Classification after Stage 1

	Rider	Team	Time
1	Mark Cavendish (GBR)	Team HTC–Columbia	4h 04' 36"
2	Juan José Haedo (ARG)	Team Saxo Bank	+ 4"
3	Alexander Kristoff (NOR)	BMC Racing Team	+ 6"
4	Maarten Tjallingii (NED)	Rabobank	+ 6"
5	Marc de Maar (NED)	UnitedHealthcare–Maxxis	+ 7"
6	Chad Beyer (USA)	BMC Racing Team	+ 8"
7	Paul Mach (USA)	Bissell	+ 10"
8	Robert Hunter (RSA)	Garmin–Transitions	+ 10"
9	Jonathan Cantwell (AUS)	Fly V Australia	+ 10"
10	Marcus Burghardt (GER)	BMC Racing Team	+ 10"

=== Stage 2 ===
May 17, 2010 — Davis to Santa Rosa, 109.5 miles (176.2 km)

This stage was mostly flat, using most of the same course from stage 1 of the 2009 race. A notable diversion from that course, however, occurred around 20 miles (32 km) from the finish line in Santa Rosa, with the climb of Trinity Road.

The stage was slowed by rainy conditions. An early breakaway including Karl Menzies (UnitedHealthcare–Maxxis) and Thomas Rabou (Team Type 1) was caught. A group of twenty riders made a dash for the finish, with the win and the leader's jersey going to Brett Lancaster. For his efforts in the breakaway, Rabou gained the climber's jersey and the most-aggressive rider title.

Stage 2 Result

	Rider	Team	Time
1	Brett Lancaster (AUS)	Cervélo TestTeam	4h 38' 48"
2	Peter Sagan (SVK)	Liquigas–Doimo	s.t.
3	Lars Boom (NED)	Rabobank	s.t.
4	Rory Sutherland (AUS)	UnitedHealthcare–Maxxis	s.t.
5	André Steensen (DEN)	Team Saxo Bank	s.t.
6	François Parisien (CAN)	SpiderTech-Planet Energy	s.t.
7	Levi Leipheimer (USA)	Team RadioShack	s.t.
8	Ryder Hesjedal (CAN)	Garmin–Transitions	s.t.
9	Lars Bak (DEN)	Team HTC–Columbia	s.t.
10	Michael Rogers (AUS)	Team HTC–Columbia	s.t.

General Classification after Stage 2

	Rider	Team	Time
1	Brett Lancaster (AUS)	Cervélo TestTeam	8h 43' 24"
2	Peter Sagan (SVK)	Liquigas–Doimo	+ 4"
3	Karl Menzies (AUS)	UnitedHealthcare–Maxxis	+ 4"
4	Lars Boom (NED)	Rabobank	+ 6"
5	Thomas Rabou (NED)	Team Type 1	+ 6"
6	Marc de Maar (NED)	UnitedHealthcare–Maxxis	+ 7"
7	Paul Mach (USA)	Bissell	+ 8"
8	Michael Rogers (AUS)	Team HTC–Columbia	+ 10"
9	Janez Brajkovič (SLO)	Team RadioShack	+ 10"
10	Ryder Hesjedal (CAN)	Garmin–Transitions	+ 10"

=== Stage 3 ===
May 18, 2010 — San Francisco to Santa Cruz, 113.6 miles (182.8 km)

This course included the Tour's first major climb, of Bonny Doon road, 12 miles (19 km) from the finish. It was on this climb in the 2009 race that Leipheimer first took the lead that was eventually his overall margin of victory. At Bonny Doon, Levi Leipheimer, David Zabriskie, and Michael Rogers charged ahead. The peloton gave chase, but failed to make the catch, ending up 17 seconds behind. At the line it was Zabriskie who edged out the other two, to gain the time bonus and overall lead.

Stage 3 Result

	Rider	Team	Time
1	David Zabriskie (USA)	Garmin–Transitions	4h 26' 09"
2	Michael Rogers (AUS)	Team HTC–Columbia	s.t.
3	Levi Leipheimer (USA)	Team RadioShack	s.t.
4	Peter Sagan (SVK)	Liquigas–Doimo	+ 17"
5	Rory Sutherland (AUS)	UnitedHealthcare–Maxxis	+ 17"
6	Heinrich Haussler (GER)	Cervélo TestTeam	+ 17"
7	Jens Voigt (GER)	Team Saxo Bank	+ 17"
8	Chris Horner (USA)	Team RadioShack	+ 17"
9	François Parisien (CAN)	SpiderTech-Planet Energy	+ 17"
10	Ryder Hesjedal (CAN)	Garmin–Transitions	+ 17"

General Classification after Stage 3

	Rider	Team	Time
1	David Zabriskie (USA)	Garmin–Transitions	13h 09' 33"
2	Michael Rogers (AUS)	Team HTC–Columbia	+ 4"
3	Levi Leipheimer (USA)	Team RadioShack	+ 6"
4	Peter Sagan (SVK)	Liquigas–Doimo	+ 21"
5	Marc de Maar (NED)	UnitedHealthcare–Maxxis	+ 24"
6	Janez Brajkovič (SLO)	Team RadioShack	+ 27"
7	Ryder Hesjedal (CAN)	Garmin–Transitions	+ 27"
8	Peter Stetina (USA)	Garmin–Transitions	+ 27"
9	Rory Sutherland (AUS)	UnitedHealthcare–Maxxis	+ 27"
10	Tom Danielson (USA)	Garmin–Transitions	+ 27"

=== Stage 4 ===
May 19, 2010 — San José to Modesto, 121.5 miles (195.5 km)

This was a flat stage, and used the same course as Stage 3 from 2009. At the 6 miles (9.7 km) mark, the peloton faced a difficult, technical climb up Sierra Road, but after descending it there were no further difficulties in the route. A mass sprint finish was expected, with the potential for high winds, common in the San Joaquin Valley, to make it so general classification contenders have to work hard to stay with the leading group.

Stage 4 Result

	Rider	Team	Time
1	Francesco Chicchi (ITA)	Liquigas–Doimo	4h 55' 02"
2	Juan José Haedo (ARG)	Team Saxo Bank	s.t.
3	Mark Cavendish (GBR)	Team HTC–Columbia	s.t.
4	Theo Bos (NED)	Cervélo TestTeam	s.t.
5	Jonathan Cantwell (AUS)	Fly V Australia	s.t.
6	Alexander Kristoff (NOR)	BMC Racing Team	s.t.
7	Ken Hanson (USA)	Team Type 1	s.t.
8	Andreas Stauff (GER)	Quick-Step	s.t.
9	Alex Candelario (USA)	Kelly Benefit Strategies	s.t.
10	Guillaume Boivin (CAN)	SpiderTech-Planet Energy	s.t.

General Classification after Stage 4

	Rider	Team	Time
1	David Zabriskie (USA)	Garmin–Transitions	18h 04' 35"
2	Michael Rogers (AUS)	Team HTC–Columbia	+ 4"
3	Levi Leipheimer (USA)	Team RadioShack	+ 6"
4	Peter Sagan (SVK)	Liquigas–Doimo	+ 21"
5	Marc de Maar (NED)	UnitedHealthcare–Maxxis	+ 24"
6	Janez Brajkovič (SLO)	Team RadioShack	+ 27"
7	Ryder Hesjedal (CAN)	Garmin–Transitions	+ 27"
8	Rory Sutherland (AUS)	UnitedHealthcare–Maxxis	+ 27"
9	Tom Danielson (USA)	Garmin–Transitions	+ 27"
10	Peter Stetina (USA)	Garmin–Transitions	+ 27"

=== Stage 5 ===
May 20, 2010 — Visalia to Bakersfield, 121.5 miles (195.5 km)

After a lengthy transfer, two new towns were visited in Stage 5. This was categorized as a flat stage, though a climb with a 14% gradient occurs early in the stage and the finish in Bakersfield included three visits to a climb that tops out over 10% in grade. However, Lance Armstrong crashed just outside Visalia in Stage 5 and had to withdraw from the Tour of California.

Stage 5 Result

	Rider	Team	Time
1	Peter Sagan (SVK)	Liquigas–Doimo	4h 52' 28"
2	Michael Rogers (AUS)	Team HTC–Columbia	s.t.
3	David Zabriskie (USA)	Garmin–Transitions	s.t.
4	Chris Horner (USA)	Team RadioShack	s.t.
5	Paul Martens (GER)	Rabobank	s.t.
6	Tony Martin (GER)	Team HTC–Columbia	s.t.
7	Levi Leipheimer (USA)	Team RadioShack	s.t.
8	Ryder Hesjedal (CAN)	Garmin–Transitions	s.t.
9	Jens Voigt (GER)	Team Saxo Bank	s.t.
10	Rory Sutherland (AUS)	UnitedHealthcare–Maxxis	s.t.

General Classification after Stage 5

	Rider	Team	Time
1	Michael Rogers (AUS)	Team HTC–Columbia	22h 56' 59"
2	David Zabriskie (USA)	Garmin–Transitions	+ 0"
3	Levi Leipheimer (USA)	Team RadioShack	+ 10"
4	Peter Sagan (SVK)	Liquigas–Doimo	+ 15"
5	Marc de Maar (NED)	UnitedHealthcare–Maxxis	+ 28"
6	Janez Brajkovič (SLO)	Team RadioShack	+ 31"
7	Ryder Hesjedal (CAN)	Garmin–Transitions	+ 31"
8	Peter Stetina (USA)	Garmin–Transitions	+ 31"
9	Tom Danielson (USA)	Garmin–Transitions	+ 31"
10	Rory Sutherland (AUS)	UnitedHealthcare–Maxxis	+ 31"

=== Stage 6 ===
May 21, 2010 — Palmdale to Big Bear Lake, 135 miles (217 km)

This has already been declared the queen stage of the 2010 Tour, and may be the most difficult stage in the Tour's five-year history. It was the first Tour of California stage ever to conclude with a mountain climb. The climb to Big Bear Lake reached 6,752 ft (2,058 m) in elevation. This stage was originally scheduled to begin at the Rose Bowl in Pasadena, but the roads on which the course would have traveled were damaged by heavy snowfall at high elevations in 2010, making them unsafe to use. The stage began just north of the Angeles National Forest at Palmdale City Hall and visited the San Gabriel and San Bernardino Mountains, incorporating 2,000 ft (610 m) more climbing than the original course from Pasadena. From there, the race headed south along the Angeles Forest Highway before cutting across the Upper Big Tujunga Canyon to travel on the undamaged part of the course as previously designed.

Stage 6 Result

	Rider	Team	Time
1	Peter Sagan (SVK)	Liquigas–Doimo	6h 07' 08"
2	Rory Sutherland (AUS)	UnitedHealthcare–Maxxis	s.t.
3	Michael Rogers (AUS)	Team HTC–Columbia	s.t.
4	Levi Leipheimer (USA)	Team RadioShack	s.t.
5	Ryder Hesjedal (CAN)	Garmin–Transitions	s.t.
6	Phil Zajicek (USA)	Fly V Australia	s.t.
7	Paul Martens (GER)	Rabobank	s.t.
8	David Zabriskie (USA)	Garmin–Transitions	s.t.
9	Jens Voigt (GER)	Team Saxo Bank	s.t.
10	Tom Danielson (USA)	Garmin–Transitions	s.t.

General Classification after Stage 6

	Rider	Team	Time
1	Michael Rogers (AUS)	Team HTC–Columbia	29h 04' 03"
2	David Zabriskie (USA)	Garmin–Transitions	+ 4"
3	Peter Sagan (SVK)	Liquigas–Doimo	+ 9"
4	Levi Leipheimer (USA)	Team RadioShack	+ 14"
5	Rory Sutherland (AUS)	UnitedHealthcare–Maxxis	+ 29"
6	Marc de Maar (NED)	UnitedHealthcare–Maxxis	+ 32"
7	Janez Brajkovič (SLO)	Team RadioShack	+ 35"
8	Ryder Hesjedal (CAN)	Garmin–Transitions	+ 35"
9	Tom Danielson (USA)	Garmin–Transitions	+ 35"
10	Peter Stetina (USA)	Garmin–Transitions	+ 35"

=== Stage 7 ===
May 22, 2010 — Los Angeles 20 mi (32 km) (individual time trial)

The one race against the clock for the 2010 Tour took place in Los Angeles, on a longer course than was used in Solvang in the previous three editions of the race. It ran twenty miles over two laps in downtown Los Angeles. The course passed such landmarks as the Millennium Biltmore Hotel, Walt Disney Concert Hall, Cathedral of Our Lady of the Angels, and Los Angeles City Hall, finishing at Chick Hearn Court at L.A. Live. It was expected that the riders complete the course in anywhere from 41 to 48 minutes. The first 90 riders to take the course were staggered one minute at a time, and the final 30 spaced out with two minutes separating their departures.

Stage 7 Result

	Rider	Team	Time
1	Tony Martin (GER)	Team HTC–Columbia	41' 41"
2	Michael Rogers (AUS)	Team HTC–Columbia	+ 22"
3	David Zabriskie (USA)	Garmin–Transitions	+ 27"
4	Levi Leipheimer (USA)	Team RadioShack	+ 33"
5	Jens Voigt (GER)	Team Saxo Bank	+ 59"
6	Bert Grabsch (GER)	Team HTC–Columbia	+ 1' 06"
7	Maarten Tjallingii (NED)	Rabobank	+ 1' 12"
8	Chris Horner (USA)	Team RadioShack	+ 1' 19"
9	Rory Sutherland (AUS)	UnitedHealthcare–Maxxis	+ 1' 19"
10	Robert Hunter (RSA)	Garmin–Transitions	+ 1' 21"

General Classification after Stage 7

	Rider	Team	Time
1	Michael Rogers (AUS)	Team HTC–Columbia	29h 46' 06"
2	David Zabriskie (USA)	Garmin–Transitions	+ 9"
3	Levi Leipheimer (USA)	Team RadioShack	+ 25"
4	Jens Voigt (GER)	Team Saxo Bank	+ 1' 12"
5	Rory Sutherland (AUS)	UnitedHealthcare–Maxxis	+ 1' 26"
6	Chris Horner (USA)	Team RadioShack	+ 1' 32"
7	Peter Sagan (SVK)	Liquigas–Doimo	+ 1' 34"
8	Ryder Hesjedal (CAN)	Garmin–Transitions	+ 1' 46"
9	Janez Brajkovič (SLO)	Team RadioShack	+ 2' 10"
10	Tom Danielson (USA)	Garmin–Transitions	+ 2' 21"

=== Stage 8 ===
May 23, 2010 — Thousand Oaks circuit race, 83.5 miles (134.4 km)

The Tour concluded with a hilly circuit race in Thousand Oaks, with a steep climb up Mulholland Highway before finishing in Westlake. The circuit course was 21 miles (34 km) long, and it was covered four times. It reaches a height of 2,000 feet (610 m).

Stage 8 Result

	Rider	Team	Time
1	Ryder Hesjedal (CAN)	Garmin–Transitions	3h 21' 56"
2	George Hincapie (USA)	BMC Racing Team	s.t.
3	Carlos Barredo (ESP)	Quick-Step	s.t.
4	Chris Horner (USA)	Team RadioShack	s.t.
5	Óscar Pujol (ESP)	Cervélo TestTeam	+ 5"
6	Sebastian Langeveld (NED)	Rabobank	+ 28"
7	Levi Leipheimer (USA)	Team RadioShack	+ 28"
8	Michael Rogers (AUS)	Team HTC–Columbia	+ 28"
9	David Zabriskie (USA)	Garmin–Transitions	+ 28"
10	Yaroslav Popovych (UKR)	Team RadioShack	+ 34"

Final General Classification

	Rider	Team	Time
1	Michael Rogers (AUS)	Team HTC–Columbia	33h 08' 30"
2	David Zabriskie (USA)	Garmin–Transitions	+ 9"
3	Levi Leipheimer (USA)	Team RadioShack	+ 25"
4	Chris Horner (USA)	Team RadioShack	+ 1' 04"
5	Ryder Hesjedal (CAN)	Garmin–Transitions	+ 1' 08"
6	Jens Voigt (GER)	Team Saxo Bank	+ 1' 44"
7	Rory Sutherland (AUS)	UnitedHealthcare–Maxxis	+ 1' 58"
8	Peter Sagan (SVK)	Liquigas–Doimo	+ 2' 06"
9	Janez Brajkovič (SLO)	Team RadioShack	+ 2' 42"
10	Phil Zajicek (USA)	Fly V Australia	+ 3' 21"

== Final standings ==
=== General Classification ===
#	Rider	Team	Time
1	Michael Rogers (AUS)	Team HTC–Columbia	33h 08' 30"
2	David Zabriskie (USA)	Garmin–Transitions	+ 9"
3	Levi Leipheimer (USA)	Team RadioShack	+ 25"
4	Chris Horner (USA)	Team RadioShack	+ 1' 04"
5	Ryder Hesjedal (CAN)	Garmin–Transitions	+ 1' 08"
6	Jens Voigt (GER)	Team Saxo Bank	+ 1' 44"
7	Rory Sutherland (AUS)	UnitedHealthcare–Maxxis	+ 1' 58"
8	Peter Sagan (SVK)	Liquigas–Doimo	+ 2' 06"
9	Janez Brajkovič (SLO)	Team RadioShack	+ 2' 42"
10	Phil Zajicek (USA)	Fly V Australia	+ 3' 21"

=== Teams Classification ===
#	Team	Time
1	Garmin–Transitions	99h 29' 17"
2	Team RadioShack	+ 2"
3	Team HTC–Columbia	+ 6' 58"
4	UnitedHealthcare–Maxxis	+ 38' 38"
5	Team Type 1	+ 51' 37"
6	BMC Racing Team	+ 1h 00' 54"
7	Team Saxo Bank	+ 1h 04' 11"
8	Rabobank	+ 1h 23' 35"
9	Fly V Australia	+ 1h 33' 35"
10	Bissell	+ 1h 57' 41"

=== King of the Mountains Classification ===
#	Rider	Team	Points
1	Thomas Rabou (NED)	Team Type 1	77
2	George Hincapie (USA)	BMC Racing Team	27
3	Davide Frattini (ITA)	Team Type 1	20
4	Andy Schleck (LUX)	Team Saxo Bank	15
5	Jason McCartney (USA)	Team RadioShack	15
6	Paul Mach (USA)	Bissell	14
7	Matthew Wilson (AUS)	Garmin–Transitions	14
8	Levi Leipheimer (USA)	Team RadioShack	11
9	Rob Britton (CAN)	Bissell	11
10	Jakob Fuglsang (DEN)	Team Saxo Bank	10

=== Sprint Classification ===
#	Rider	Team	Points
1	Peter Sagan (SVK)	Liquigas–Doimo	49
2	Michael Rogers (AUS)	Team HTC–Columbia	41
3	David Zabriskie (USA)	Garmin–Transitions	30
4	Levi Leipheimer (USA)	Team RadioShack	29
5	Ryder Hesjedal (CAN)	Garmin–Transitions	28
6	Rory Sutherland (AUS)	UnitedHealthcare–Maxxis	26
7	George Hincapie (USA)	BMC Racing Team	19
8	Chris Horner (USA)	Team RadioShack	17
9	Carlos Barredo (ESP)	Quick-Step	15
10	Paul Martens (GER)	Rabobank	12

=== Young Rider Classification ===
#	Rider	Team	Time
1	Peter Sagan (SVK)	Liquigas–Doimo	33h 10' 36"
2	Peter Stetina (USA)	Garmin–Transitions	+ 1' 51"
3	Tom Peterson (USA)	Garmin–Transitions	+ 34' 20"
4	Tejay van Garderen (USA)	Team HTC–Columbia	+ 39' 36"
5	David Boily (CAN)	SpiderTech-Planet Energy	+ 54' 29"
6	Chris Butler (USA)	BMC Racing Team	+ 1h 04' 29"
7	Max Jenkins (USA)	UnitedHealthcare–Maxxis	+ 1h 19' 16"
8	Chad Beyer (USA)	BMC Racing Team	+ 1h 29' 52"
9	Kiel Reijnen (USA)	Jelly Belly–Kenda	+ 1h 30' 55"
10	Nikolas Maes (BEL)	Quick-Step	+ 1h 38' 17"

== Classification leadership ==
In the 2010 Tour of California, five different jerseys were awarded. For the general classification, calculated by adding the finishing times of the stages per cyclist, the leader received a yellow jersey. This classification was considered the most important of the Tour of California, and the winner of the general classification was considered the winner of the Tour of California.

Additionally, there was also a sprints classification, akin to what is called the points classification in other races, which awarded a green jersey. In the sprints classification, cyclists received points for finishing in the top 10 in a stage. The winner got 15 points, second place 12, third 10, fourth 7, and one point less per place down the line, to a single point for tenth. In addition, some points could be won in intermediate sprints.

There was also a mountains classification, which awarded a red jersey. In the mountains classifications, points were won by reaching the top of a mountain before other cyclists. Each climb was categorized, either first, second, third, or fourth category, with more points available for the harder climbs.

There was also a youth classification. This classification was calculated the same way as the general classification, but only young cyclists (under 23) were in. The leader of the young rider classification received a white jersey.

The fifth jersey was not awarded on the basis of a time or points-based classification. It was for each stage's "Most Courageous" rider, akin to the combativity award in the Tour de France. The rider who received this award as given a blue jersey on the podium, and wore a red bib number in the next stage. Unlike the Tour de France's combativity award, there was no overall award given.

There was also a classification for teams. In this classification, the times of the best three cyclists per stage were added, and the team with the lowest time was leader.

Stage	Winner	General Classification	Youth Classification	Mountains Classification	Sprint Classification	Most Courageous	Team Classification
1	Mark Cavendish	Mark Cavendish	Alexander Kristoff	Paul Mach	Mark Cavendish	Maarten Tjallingii	Team HTC–Columbia
2	Brett Lancaster	Brett Lancaster	Peter Sagan	Thomas Rabou	Brett Lancaster	Thomas Rabou	UnitedHealthcare–Maxxis
3	David Zabriskie	David Zabriskie	Peter Sagan	Thomas Rabou	Mark Cavendish	Will Routley	Team RadioShack
4	Francesco Chicchi	David Zabriskie	Peter Sagan	Ryan Anderson	Mark Cavendish	Lars Boom	Team RadioShack
5	Peter Sagan	Michael Rogers	Peter Sagan	Ryan Anderson	Peter Sagan	Ben Day	Team RadioShack
6	Peter Sagan	Michael Rogers	Peter Sagan	Thomas Rabou	Peter Sagan	George Hincapie	Team RadioShack
7	Tony Martin	Michael Rogers	Peter Sagan	Thomas Rabou	Peter Sagan	Tony Martin	Garmin–Transitions
8	Ryder Hesjedal	Michael Rogers	Peter Sagan	Thomas Rabou	Peter Sagan	Yaroslav Popovych	Garmin–Transitions
Final		Michael Rogers	Peter Sagan	Thomas Rabou	Peter Sagan	n/a	Garmin–Transitions
