= Tour of Utah =

Annual cycling race in the United States

- Official logo

Race details
- Date: August
- Region: Idaho; Utah; Wyoming
- Local name(s): The Tour
- Nickname(s): America's Toughest Stage Race
- Discipline: Road
- Competition: UCI America Tour (2.HC)
- Type: Stage race
- Organiser: Larry H. Miller Group of Companies
- Web site: www.tourofutah.com

History
- First edition: 2004
- Editions: 15 (as of 2019)
- First winner: John Osguthorpe (USA)
- Most wins: Levi Leipheimer (USA); Tom Danielson (USA) (2 wins)
- Most recent: Ben Hermans (BEL)

The Larry H. Miller Tour of Utah, was an annual multi-day road cycling race; traversing the states of Idaho, Utah, and Wyoming. (Note: Stage 5, in the 2014 edition, started in Evanston, Wyoming. Stage 1, in the 2015 edition, looped through Bear Lake County, Idaho.) Since the 2011 edition, the tour holds UCI classification (currently as 2.HC). Between five and six UCI WorldTeams compete annually.

== History ==
The Tour of Utah began as an amateur race in 2000. It was originally called the Thanksgiving Point Stage Race. It received its final name in 2004. Originally organized by cycling enthusiasts, the race was purchased by the Larry H. Miller Group of Companies, Larry H. Miller's holding company, in 2007. The tour received UCI classification (2.2) in 2006. However, the 2007 edition was postponed due to lack of sponsorship.

The 2008 and 2009 editions subsequently returned to United States National Racing Calendar. After the 2010 edition, the Tour of Utah was placed in the UCI America Tour, and regained UCI classification (2.1). Five UCI ProTeams were among the sixteen teams competing in the 2011 and 2013 editions, and six were among the seventeen teams competing in the 2012 edition. In the 2014 edition, six of the sixteen teams were UCI ProTeams. In 2015, the Tour rating was elevated to 2.HC, one of the few UCI-sanctioned, multi-stage, pro cycling events in North America.

In 2010, only 71 of the initial 140 riders finished. After receiving 2.1 status in 2011, a stronger field participated; 88 of the initial 120 competitors finished. In September 2014, it was announced that the race was promoted to 2.HC status, from 2015 and onwards.

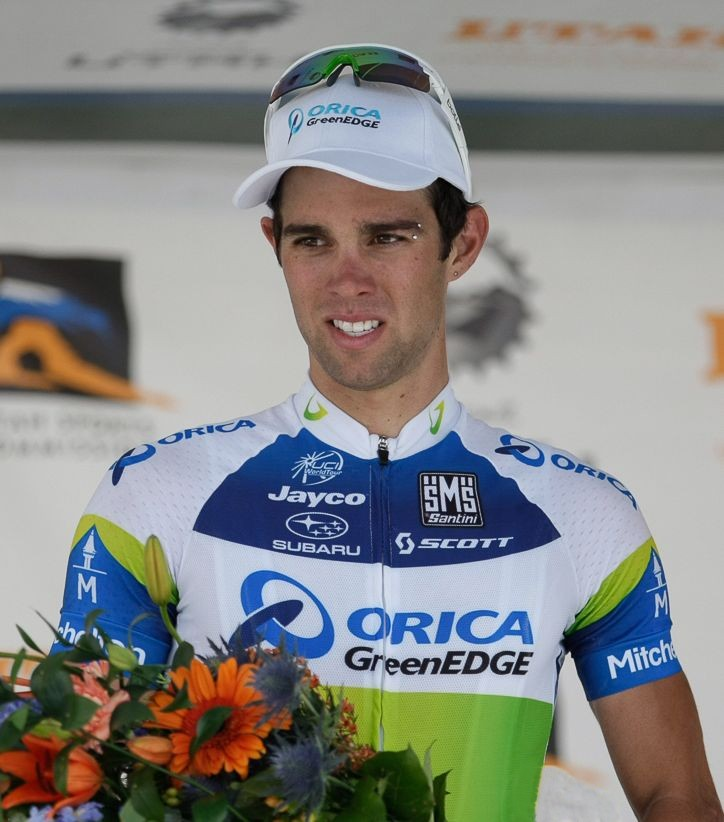
Michael Matthews winner of Stage 2 of the 2013 Tour of Utah

With the Tour of California ending in 2019, the United States has no event that is part of the UCI World Tour. This made the Tour of Utah the highest level multi-day road cycling race in the United States. Additionally, it was tied with the one-day Maryland Cycling Classic as the highest overall road cycling race in the United States.

The 2020 and 2021 editions of the Larry H. Miller Tour of Utah were cancelled due to safety concerns surrounding the COVID-19 pandemic.

Tour of Utah operations were licensed to Medalist Sports in 2021. The event was cancelled again for 2022. On December 22, 2021, Medalist Sports stated it would no longer pursue the return of the Tour of Utah.

== Results ==
=== General classification ===
Year	Yellow jersey	
2004	Johnathan Osguthorpe (USA)	Ogden One
2005	Andrew Bajadali (USA)	Vitamin Cottage
2006	Scott Moninger (USA)	Health Net Pro Cycling
2007	Not held	
2008	Jeff Louder (USA)	BMC Racing Team
2009	Francisco Mancebo (ESP)	Rock Racing
2010	Levi Leipheimer (USA)	Mellow Johnny's
2011	Levi Leipheimer (USA)	Team RadioShack
2012	Johann Tschopp (SUI)	BMC Racing Team
2013	Tom Danielson (USA)	Garmin–Sharp
2014	Tom Danielson (USA)	Garmin–Sharp
2015	Joe Dombrowski (USA)	Cannondale–Garmin
2016	Lachlan Morton (AUS)	Jelly Belly–Maxxis
2017	Rob Britton (CAN)	Rally Cycling
2018	Sepp Kuss (USA)	LottoNL–Jumbo
2019	Ben Hermans (BEL)	Israel Cycling Academy
2020	Not held	
2021	Not held	
2022	Not held	

=== Sprints classification ===
Year	White jersey	
2004	Not awarded	
2005	Charles Coyle (USA)	Vitamin Cottage
2006	Sergey Lagutin (UZB)	Navigators Insurance
2007	Not held	
2008	Bradley White (USA)	SuccessfulLiving.com
2009	David Veilleux (CAN)	Kelly Benefit Strategies
2010	David Tanner (AUS)	Fly V Australia
2011	Roman Van Uden (NZL)	PureBlack Racing
2012	Michael Matthews (AUS)	Rabobank
2013	Michael Matthews (AUS)	Orica–GreenEDGE
2014	Jure Kocjan (SLO)	Team SmartStop
2015	Brent Bookwalter (USA)	BMC Racing Team
2016	Kiel Reijnen (USA)	Trek–Segafredo
2017	Travis McCabe (USA)	UnitedHealthcare
2018	Travis McCabe (USA)	UnitedHealthcare
2019	Travis McCabe (USA)	Floyd's Pro Cycling
2020	Not held	
2021	Not held	
2022	Not held	

=== Youth classification ===
Year	Blue jersey	
2004	Not awarded	
2005	Tyler Butterfield (BER)	Vendee U
2006	Blake Caldwell (USA)	TIAA–CREF
2007	Not held	
2008	Peter Stetina (USA)	Garmin–Chipotle p/b H30
2009	Alex Howes (USA)	Felt–Holowesko Partners
2010	Ian Boswell (USA)	Bissell
2011	Cristhian Montoya (COL)	Gobernación de Antioquia
2012	Joe Dombrowski (USA)	Bontrager–Livestrong
2013	Lachlan Morton (AUS)	Garmin–Sharp
2014	Dylan Teuns (BEL)	BMC Racing Team
2015	Daniel Martínez (COL)	Colombia
2016	Adrien Costa (USA)	Axeon–Hagens Berman
2017	Neilson Powless (USA)	Axeon–Hagens Berman
2018	Luis Villalobos (MEX)	Aevolo
2019	João Almeida (POR)	Hagens Berman Axeon
2020	Not held	
2021	Not held	
2022	Not held	

=== Mountains classification ===
Year	Polka-dot jersey	
2004	Not awarded	
2005	Burke Swindlehurst (USA)	Seasilver
2006	Neil Shirley (USA)	KJZZ-Pro Composite
2007	Not held	
2008	Glen Chadwick (NZL)	Team Type 1
2009	Alex Howes (USA)	Felt–Holowesko Partners
2010	Jai Crawford (AUS)	Fly V Australia
2011	Levi Leipheimer (USA)	Team RadioShack
2012	Ben Jacques-Maynes (USA)	Bissell
2013	Michael Torckler (NZL)	Bissell
2014	Joey Rosskopf (USA)	Hincapie Sportswear Development Team
2015	Gregory Daniel (USA)	Axeon Cycling Team
2016	Adrien Costa (USA)	Axeon–Hagens Berman
2017	Jacob Rathe (USA)	Jelly Belly–Maxxis
2018	Sepp Kuss (USA)	LottoNL–Jumbo
2019	Hayden McCormick (NZL)	Team BridgeLane
2020	Not held	
2021	Not held	
2022	Not held	

=== Teams classification ===
Year	Green jersey
2004	Not awarded
2005	Vitamin Cottage
2006	Navigators Insurance
2007	Not held
2008	BMC Racing Team
2009	Rock Racing
2010	Fly V Australia
2011	Gobernación de Antioquia
2012	RadioShack–Nissan
2013	RadioShack–Leopard
2014	Lampre–Merida
2015	Colombia
2016	BMC Racing Team
2017	BMC Racing Team
2018	EF Education First–Drapac p/b Cannondale
2019	EF Education First
2020	Not held
2021	Not held
2022	Not held
