= 2011 Tour of Utah =

2010–11 UCI America Tour

Race details
- Dates: August 9–14, 2011
- Stages: 6
- Winning time: 15h 53' 12"

Results
Jersey awarded to the overall winner	Winner	Levi Leipheimer (USA)	(Team RadioShack)
	Second	Sergio Henao (COL)	(Gobernación de Antioquia)
	Third	Janez Brajkovič (SLO)	(Team RadioShack)
Jersey awarded to the mountains classification winner	Mountains	Levi Leipheimer (USA)	(Team RadioShack)
Jersey awarded to the youth classification winner	Youth	Cristian Montoya (COL)	(Gobernación de Antioquia)
Jersey awarded to the sprints classification winner	Sprints	Roman Van Uden (NZL)	(PureBlack Racing)
	Team	Gobernación de Antioquia	

The 2011 Tour of Utah was the eighth edition of the Tour of Utah. For the first time, the race was included on the UCI America Tour, with a classification of 2.1. As such, the race is only open to teams on the UCI Pro Tour, UCI Professional Continental and UCI Continental circuits. The race took place between August 9–14, 2011 as a six-day, six-stage race, similar to the prior two years. The race joined the 2011 Tour of California and the 2011 USA Pro Cycling Challenge as the only three UCI-ranked stage races in the United States

== Teams ==
After receiving UCI status, the race confirmed that three ProTeams will compete in the 2011 Tour: Team RadioShack, HTC–Highroad and BMC Racing Team. Later, two more ProTeams, Garmin–Cervélo and Liquigas–Cannondale, entered the race, making for a total of five ProTeams, including all four of the US-based ProTeams. Also appearing will be four UCI Professional Continental teams and seven UCI Continental teams, making a total of 16 teams that will be sending either 6 or 8 riders per team to the event for a total of 120 riders. Trek-Livestrong U23, the North American developmental team of Team RadioShack, was originally scheduled to compete but was bumped by all the additions of higher-ranked UCI Continental teams. Of the teams competing, only six of the teams had competed in the 2010 Tour of Utah (not counting the partial participation by two members of Team RadioShack in 2010).

UCI ProTeams

- BMC Racing Team *
- Garmin–Cervélo
- HTC–Highroad
- Liquigas–Cannondale
- Team RadioShack

UCI Professional Continental Teams

- SpiderTech–C10
- Geox–TMC
- Team Type 1–Sanofi *
- UnitedHealthcare *

(* – participated in 2010)

UCI Continental Teams

- Bissell *
- Jamis–Sutter Home *
- Kelly Benefit Strategies–OptumHealth *
- Endura Racing
- PureBlack Racing (Rabobank Continental Team)
- Gobernación de Antioquia-Indeportes Antiquia
- Realcyclist.com Cycling Team

== Contenders ==
In addition to all of the last three champions of the race -- (Jeff Louder (BMC), Francisco Mancebo (Realcyclist.com) and Leipheimer (RadioShack)) -- the race added potential contenders Tom Danielson (Garmin), Christian Vande Velde (Garmin), Tejay van Garderen (HTC), Ryder Hesjedal (Garmin), George Hincapie (BMC), Jani Brajkovič (RadioShack), David Zabriskie (Garmin) and Óscar Sevilla (Gobernación). Because the race was held earlier in August this year than in previous years, a few riders—notably Brajkovič—were using Utah as their final tune-up for the 2011 Vuelta a España.

== Stages ==
Like 2009 and 2010, the 2011 race had a prologue, three road stages, a criterium and a time trial. Unlike the 2010 race, though, the criterium was measured by distance instead of time. In addition, the race had stages finish in Ogden and Provo, reducing its focus on Salt Lake City and Park City. Although the significantly stronger UCI-ranked field figured to create a more competitive race, a breakaway on the mountainous first stage gave four riders—Leipheimer and Brajkovič from RadioShack and Sevilla and Sergio Henao from Gobernación—a lead over all the other contenders of more than 2:30. Leipheimer then used second-place finishes in stages 3 and 5 to defend his championship and become the race's first repeat winner.

Stage results
Stage	Date	Route	Terrain	Length	Winner
P	9 August	Utah Olympic Park	Individual time trial	2.0 km (1.2 mi)	Sergio Henao (COL)
1	10 August	Ogden – Ogden	Medium mountain stage	182.9 km (113.6 mi)	Jesse Anthony (USA)
2	11 August	Lehi – Provo	Hilly stage	159.6 km (99.2 mi)	Jack Bauer (NZL)
3	12 August	Miller Motorsports Park	Individual time trial	15.6 km (9.7 mi)	Tejay van Garderen (USA)
4	13 August	Salt Lake City	Criterium	129 km (80 mi)	Janier Acevedo (COL)
5	14 August	Kimball Junction – Snowbird	Mountain stage	160.8 km (99.9 mi)	Sergio Henao (COL)

=== Prologue ===
August 9, 2011 -- Utah Olympic Park, individual time trial, 2.0 kilometres (1.2 mi)
The uphill prologue required the riders to time trial along a road running parallel to the bobsled run at the Utah Olympic Park in Park City. Because of the nature of the climb, most cyclists used their regular bikes instead of time-trial bikes. Colombian and Spanish riders took the first three places, with Sergio Henao of the Colombian team Gobernacion de Antioquia showing his climbing skills by winning the sprint.

Prologue Result

	Rider	Team	Time
1	Sergio Henao (COL)	Gobernacion de Antioquia	4' 05"
2	Francisco Mancebo (ESP)	Realcyclist.com Cycling Team	+ 3"
3	Óscar Sevilla (ESP)	Gobernacion de Antioquia	+ 6"
4	Tejay van Garderen (USA)	HTC–Highroad	s.t.
5	Tom Danielson (USA)	Garmin–Cervélo	+ 8"
6	Levi Leipheimer (USA)	Team RadioShack	s.t.
7	Christian Vande Velde (USA)	Garmin–Cervélo	+ 10"
8	Jack Bauer (NZL)	Endura Racing	+ 11"
9	Tyler Wren (USA)	Jamis–Sutter Home	+ 12"
10	César Grajales (COL)	Realcyclist.com Cycling Team	+ 13"

General Classification after Prologue

	Rider	Team	Time
1	Sergio Henao (COL)	Gobernacion de Antioquia	4' 05"
2	Francisco Mancebo (ESP)	Realcyclist.com Cycling Team	+ 3"
3	Óscar Sevilla (ESP)	Gobernacion de Antioquia	+ 6"
4	Tejay van Garderen (USA)	HTC–Highroad	s.t.
5	Tom Danielson (USA)	Garmin–Cervélo	+ 8"
6	Levi Leipheimer (USA)	Team RadioShack	s.t.
7	Christian Vande Velde (USA)	Garmin–Cervélo	+ 10"
8	Jack Bauer (NZL)	Endura Racing	+ 11"
9	Tyler Wren (USA)	Jamis–Sutter Home	+ 12"
10	César Grajales (COL)	Realcyclist.com Cycling Team	+ 13"

=== Stage 1 ===
August 10, 2011 -- Ogden to Ogden, 182.9 kilometres (113.6 mi)
Stage 1 featured three loops of a 61 km course around Ogden, with each loop featuring an ascent of North Ogden Pass Road. Jesse Anthony of Kelly Benefit Strategies–OptumHealth was the last survivor of an early breakaway and then managed to join up with a four-man breakaway that formed on the final ascent. In the end, as the four riders in the breakaway worked to gain time on the rest of the field, Anthony was able to sit on the breakaway and then attack it at the end for the stage win. However, the other four riders in the break established a huge advantage of over 2' 30" on their main rivals in the general classification. 116 riders remained in the race after this stage.

Stage 1 result

	Rider	Team	Time
1	Jesse Anthony (USA)	Kelly Benefit Strategies–OptumHealth	4h 39' 29"
2	Sergio Henao (COL)	Gobernacion de Antioquia	s.t.
3	Óscar Sevilla (ESP)	Gobernacion de Antioquia	s.t.
4	Levi Leipheimer (USA)	Team RadioShack	s.t.
5	Jani Brajkovič (SLO)	Team RadioShack	s.t.
6	Paul Voss (GER)	Endura Racing	+ 2' 35"
7	Rory Sutherland (AUS)	UnitedHealthcare	s.t.
8	Chase Pinkham (USA)	Bissell	s.t.
9	Maurizio Gorato (ITA)	Geox–TMC	s.t.
10	Flavio De Lune (MEX)	SpiderTech–C10	s.t.

General Classification after Stage 1

	Rider	Team	Time
1	Sergio Henao (COL)	Gobernacion de Antioquia	4h 43' 28"
2	Óscar Sevilla (ESP)	Gobernacion de Antioquia	+ 7"
3	Levi Leipheimer (USA)	Team RadioShack	+ 13"
4	Jesse Anthony (USA)	Kelly Benefit Strategies–OptumHealth	+ 18"
5	Jani Brajkovič (SLO)	Team RadioShack	+ 21"
6	Francisco Mancebo (ESP)	Realcyclist.com Cycling Team	+ 2' 43"
7	Tejay van Garderen (USA)	HTC–Highroad	+ 2' 46"
8	Tom Danielson (USA)	Garmin–Cervélo	+ 2' 48"
9	Christian Vande Velde (USA)	Garmin–Cervélo	+ 2' 50"
10	César Grajales (COL)	Realcyclist.com Cycling Team	+ 2' 53"

=== Stage 2 ===
August 11, 2011 -- Lehi to Provo, 159.6 kilometres (99.2 mi)
Stage 2 featured rolling hills but was largely flat and was anticipated to finish in a bunch sprint, with Elia Viviani of Liquigas–Cannondale and Jake Keough of UnitedHealthcare favored. However, Jack Bauer from Endura Racing managed to get a jump on both sprinters due to two crashes inside of 7 km, took off with a kilometer to go and was able to hold on for victory. Only three riders failed to finish the stage.

Stage 2 result

	Rider	Team	Time
1	Jack Bauer (NZL)	Endura Racing	3h 33' 43"
2	Elia Viviani (ITA)	Liquigas–Cannondale	s.t.
3	Jacob Keough (USA)	UnitedHealthcare	s.t.
4	Robert Förster (GER)	UnitedHealthcare	s.t.
5	Daniel Summerhill (USA)	Garmin–Cervélo	s.t.
6	Jeff Louder (USA)	BMC Racing Team	s.t.
7	Tommy Nankervis (AUS)	Realcyclist.com Cycling Team	s.t.
8	Scott Thwaites (GBR)	Endura Racing	s.t.
9	Davide Cimolai (ITA)	Liquigas–Cannondale	s.t.
10	Roman Van Uden (NZL)	PureBlack Racing	s.t.

General Classification after Stage 2

	Rider	Team	Time
1	Sergio Henao (COL)	Gobernacion de Antioquia	8h 17' 11"
2	Óscar Sevilla (ESP)	Gobernacion de Antioquia	+ 7"
3	Levi Leipheimer (USA)	Team RadioShack	+ 13"
4	Jesse Anthony (USA)	Kelly Benefit Strategies–OptumHealth	+ 18"
5	Jani Brajkovič (SLO)	Team RadioShack	+ 21"
6	Francisco Mancebo (ESP)	Realcyclist.com Cycling Team	+ 2' 43"
7	Tejay van Garderen (USA)	HTC–Highroad	+ 2' 46"
8	Tom Danielson (USA)	Garmin–Cervélo	+ 2' 48"
9	Christian Vande Velde (USA)	Garmin–Cervélo	+ 2' 50"
10	Jack Bauer (NZL)	Endura Racing	+ 2' 51"

=== Stage 3 ===
August 12, 2011 -- Miller Motorsports Park, individual time trial, 15.6 kilometres (9.7 mi)
Stage 3 was contested on a similar but slightly longer course than the 2009 and 2010 Tours used. American Tejay van Garderen of HTC–Highroad achieved his first professional victory on his 23rd birthday by edging Leipheimer of Team RadioShack. However, Leipheimer took over the general classification lead, with his teammate Jani Brajkovič taking over second. 112 riders remained in the race.

Stage 3 result

	Rider	Team	Time
1	Tejay van Garderen (USA)	HTC–Highroad	17' 33"
2	Levi Leipheimer (USA)	Team RadioShack	+ 6"
3	Patrick Gretsch (GER)	HTC–Highroad	+ 10"
4	Alexander Wetterhall (SWE)	Endura Racing	+ 18"
5	Christian Vande Velde (USA)	Garmin–Cervélo	+ 19"
6	Jani Brajkovič (SLO)	Team RadioShack	+ 25"
7	Danny Pate (USA)	HTC–Highroad	+ 27"
8	Tom Danielson (USA)	Garmin–Cervélo	+ 30"
9	Tom Zirbel (USA)	Jamis–Sutter Home	+ 30"
10	George Hincapie (USA)	BMC Racing Team	+ 30"

General Classification after Stage 3

	Rider	Team	Time
1	Levi Leipheimer (USA)	Team RadioShack	8h 35' 04"
2	Jani Brajkovič (SLO)	Team RadioShack	+ 27"
3	Óscar Sevilla (ESP)	Gobernacion de Antioquia	+ 29"
4	Sergio Henao (COL)	Gobernacion de Antioquia	+ 56"
5	Jesse Anthony (USA)	Kelly Benefit Strategies–OptumHealth	+ 1' 24"
6	Tejay van Garderen (USA)	HTC–Highroad	+ 2' 27"
7	Christian Vande Velde (USA)	Garmin–Cervélo	+ 2' 50"
8	Tom Danielson (USA)	Garmin–Cervélo	+ 2' 59"
9	George Hincapie (USA)	BMC Racing Team	+ 3' 17"
10	Jack Bauer (NZL)	Endura Racing	+ 3' 20"

=== Stage 4 ===
August 13, 2011 -- Salt Lake City, 129 kilometres (80 mi)
Stage 4 was a criterium around the state capital in Salt Lake City, using part of the course employed for the prologue in the previous two tours. The loop was around 12 km, and the riders were required to make 11 circuits of it, including a 13% climb up East Capitol Street in each circuit. Another Colombian rider, Janier Acevedo from Gobernacion de Antioquia, won the stage and returned his team to the lead in the teams classification. After this stage, 104 riders remained in the race, meaning that only a total of 16 riders had left the race, but among the riders failing to complete this stage was fifth-place Jesse Anthony, who fell ill overnight.

Stage 4 result

	Rider	Team	Time
1	Janier Acevedo (COL)	Gobernacion de Antioquia	2h 56' 18"
2	Javier Mejías (ESP)	Team Type 1–Sanofi	+ 5"
3	Rubens Bertogliati (SUI)	Team Type 1–Sanofi	+ 6"
4	Francisco Mancebo (ESP)	Realcyclist.com Cycling Team	s.t.
5	Chad Beyer (USA)	BMC Racing Team	s.t.
6	Lucas Euser (USA)	SpiderTech–C10	s.t.
7	Pat McCarty (USA)	SpiderTech–C10	s.t.
8	Timothy Duggan (USA)	Liquigas–Cannondale	s.t.
9	Christian Vande Velde (USA)	Garmin–Cervélo	s.t.
10	Christopher Jones (USA)	UnitedHealthcare	s.t.

General Classification after Stage 4

	Rider	Team	Time
1	Levi Leipheimer (USA)	Team RadioShack	11h 32' 59"
2	Sergio Henao (COL)	Gobernacion de Antioquia	+ 23"
3	Jani Brajkovič (SLO)	Team RadioShack	+ 27"
4	Óscar Sevilla (ESP)	Gobernacion de Antioquia	+ 29"
5	Christian Vande Velde (USA)	Garmin–Cervélo	+ 1' 18"
6	Timothy Duggan (USA)	Liquigas–Cannondale	+ 2" 06"
7	Francisco Mancebo (ESP)	Realcyclist.com Cycling Team	+ 2' 09"
8	Janier Acevedo (COL)	Gobernacion de Antioquia	+ 2' 27"
9	Tejay van Garderen (USA)	HTC–Highroad	s.t.
10	Pat McCarty (USA)	SpiderTech–C10	+ 2' 30"

=== Stage 5 ===
August 14, 2010 -- Kimball Junction to Snowbird, 160.8 kilometres (99.9 mi)
The final stage of the 2010 Tour, Stage 5, was identical to the previous year's final stage. It began from Kimball Junction, just outside Park City, and trekked for 161 km through the mountains until ending on a mountaintop finish at the Snowbird ski resort. The top two riders in the general classification, Leipheimer and Sergio Henao, broke away from the rest of the elite riders to win the stage, with Henao finishing slightly ahead. Leipheimer's finish also propelled him to a one-point victory in the "King of the Mountains" competition. 16 people failed to finish this stage, but the race ended with 88 of the original 120 contestants completing the tour.

Stage 5 result

	Rider	Team	Time
1	Sergio Henao (COL)	Gobernacion de Antioquia	4h 20' 13"
2	Levi Leipheimer (USA)	Team RadioShack	s.t.
3	Jani Brajkovič (SLO)	Team RadioShack	+ 18"
4	Tom Danielson (USA)	Garmin–Cervélo	+ 50"
5	Óscar Sevilla (ESP)	Gobernacion de Antioquia	+ 1' 25"
6	Christian Vande Velde (USA)	Garmin–Cervélo	+ 2' 33"
7	Pat McCarty (USA)	SpiderTech–C10	s.t.
8	Christopher Butler (USA)	BMC Racing Team	s.t.
9	Timothy Duggan (USA)	Liquigas–Cannondale	+ 2' 38"
10	Lucas Euser (USA)	SpiderTech–C10	s.t.

Final General Classification

	Rider	Team	Time
1	Levi Leipheimer (USA)	Team RadioShack	15h 53' 12"
2	Sergio Henao (COL)	Gobernación de Antioquia	+ 23"
3	Jani Brajkovič (SLO)	Team RadioShack	+ 45"
4	Óscar Sevilla (ESP)	Gobernación de Antioquia	+ 1' 54"
5	Tom Danielson (USA)	Garmin–Cervélo	+ 3' 49"
6	Christian Vande Velde (USA)	Garmin–Cervélo	+ 3' 51"
7	Timothy Duggan (USA)	Liquigas–Cannondale	+ 4' 44"
8	Pat McCarty (USA)	SpiderTech–C10	+ 5' 03"
9	Lucas Euser (USA)	SpiderTech–C10	+ 5' 34"
10	Jeff Louder (USA)	BMC Racing Team	+ 7' 31"

== Overall ==
=== Classification leadership ===
Stage	Winner	General classification	Sprints classification	Mountains classification	Young rider classification	Most Aggressive	Team classification
P	Sergio Henao	Sergio Henao	no award	no award	Tejay van Garderen	no award	Gobernacion de Antioquia
1	Jesse Anthony	Sergio Henao	Jesse Anthony	Rubens Bertogliati	Tejay van Garderen	Jay Thompson	Gobernacion de Antioquia
2	Jack Bauer	Sergio Henao	Roman Van Uden	Rubens Bertogliati	Tejay van Garderen	John Anderson	Gobernacion de Antioquia
3	Tejay van Garderen	Levi Leipheimer	Roman Van Uden	Rubens Bertogliati	Tejay van Garderen	no award	Team RadioShack
4	Janier Acevedo	Levi Leipheimer	Janier Acevedo	Rubens Bertogliati	Tejay van Garderen	Daniel Summerhill	Gobernacion de Antioquia
5	Sergio Henao	Levi Leipheimer	Roman Van Uden	Levi Leipheimer	Cristian Montoya	Giampaolo Cheula	Gobernacion de Antioquia
Final		Levi Leipheimer	Roman Van Uden	Levi Leipheimer	Cristian Montoya	no award	Gobernacion de Antioquia
