= Darren Lill =

South African cyclist

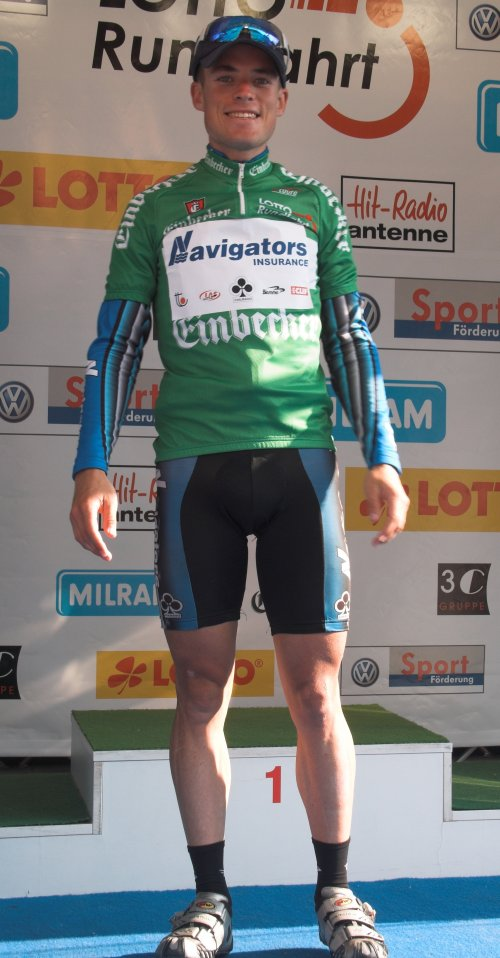
- Darren Lill in 2007

Personal information
- Born: 20 August 1982 (age 44) Grahamstown, South Africa

Cycling career
- Sport: Cycling
- Role: Rider

Professional teams
- 2001: Team IBM–Lotus Development
- 2003: Team HSBC
- 2004–2005: Barloworld
- 2007: Navigators Insurance
- 2008: BMC Racing Team
- 2009: Team Type 1
- 2010: Fly V Australia
- 2011–2012: Team Bonitas

Darren Lill (born 20 August 1982) is a South African professional racing cyclist. In 2011 he won the South African National Road Race Championships.

== Personal life ==
He is married to fellow South African cyclist Candice Lill.

== Major results ==
2006
African Road Championships

1st Road race
5th Time trial

2nd Road race, National Road Championships
4th Overall Giro del Capo

1st Mountains classification

2008
5th Tour de Leelanau
2009
6th Overall Tour de Beauce
2010
5th Overall Tour of Utah
7th Overall Tour of the Gila

1st Stage 5

2011
National Road Championships

1st Road race
3rd Time trial

All-Africa Games

2nd Time trial
4th Road race

9th Overall Tour of South Africa

1st Stage 6

2012
1st Overall Tour of Rwanda

1st Stages 3 & 7

1st Mountains classification Volta ao Alentejo
2014
4th Road race, National Road Championships
