= Pat McCarty =

American racing cyclist (born 1982)

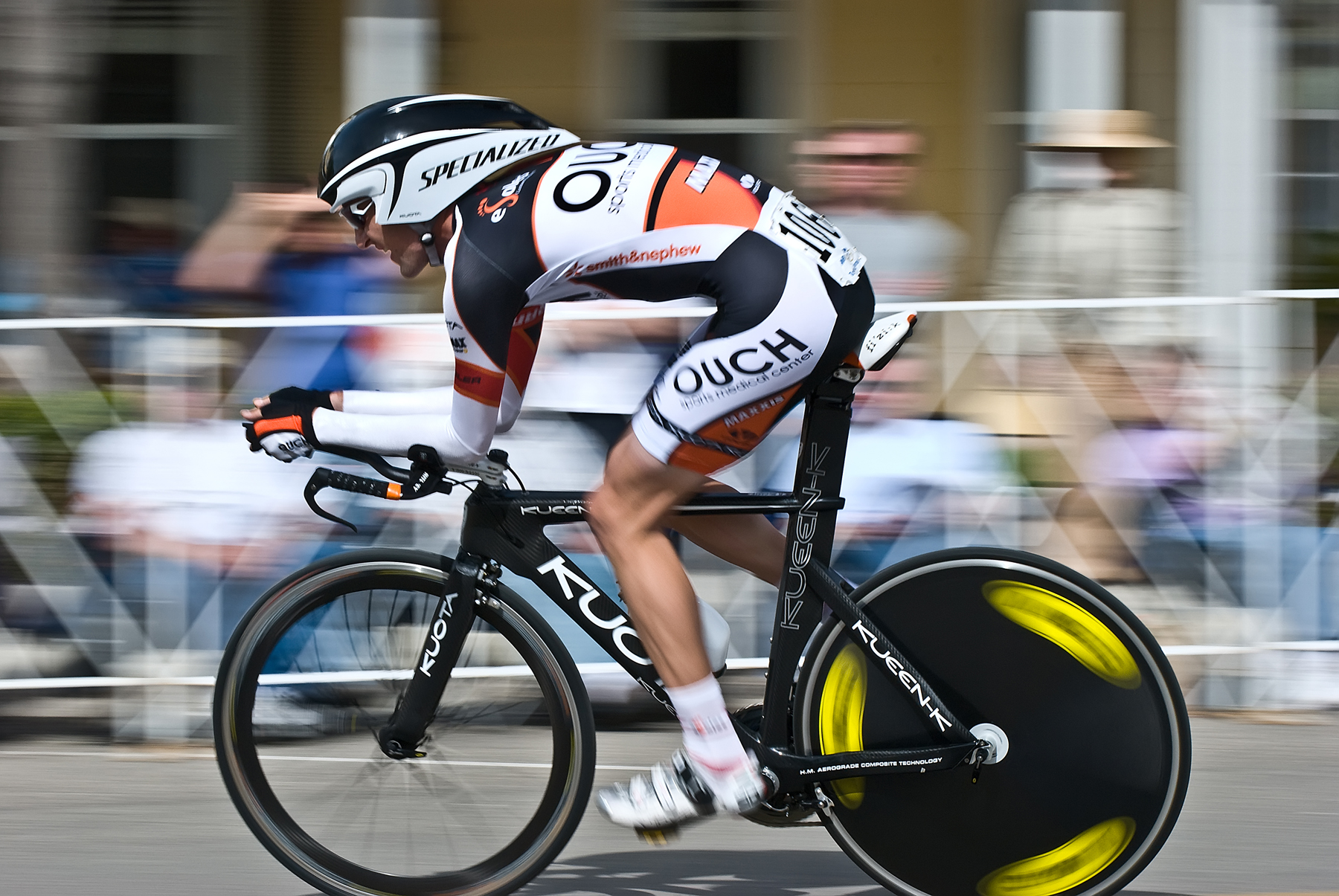
- McCarty at the 2009 Tour of California

Personal information
- Full name: Jonathan Patrick McCarty
- Born: January 24, 1982 (age 44) Allen, Texas, United States
- Height: 1.78 m (5 ft 10 in)
- Weight: 68 kg (150 lb; 10.7 st)

Cycling career
- Sport: Cycling
- Current team: Human Powered Health
- Discipline: Road
- Role: Rider; Directeur sportif
- Rider type: Climber

Professional teams
- 2004–2005: U.S. Postal Service
- 2006: Phonak
- 2007–2008: Slipstream–Chipotle
- 2009: OUCH–Maxxis
- 2010: Rock Racing
- 2011–2012: SpiderTech–C10
- 2013: Bissell

Managerial team
- 2016–: Rally Cycling

Jonathan Patrick "Pat" McCarty (born January 24, 1982) is an American former professional racing cyclist. He now works as a directeur sportif for Human Powered Health.

McCarty grew up in Allen, Texas, a suburb of Dallas. When McCarty was 11, his brother went to college and left his bike. Growing up in a cycling family, he started riding .

During 2006 McCarty rode the Giro for Phonak. After Phonak folded, he was offered a spot on Slipstream–Chipotle, but his contract was not renewed after the 2008 season.

== Major results ==
2002
4th Overall Ronde de l'Isard
6th Overall Le Triptyque des Monts et Châteaux
7th La Côte Picarde
9th Liège–Bastogne–Liège U23
2003
1st Overall Ronde de l'Isard

1st Stage 3

3rd La Transalsace
3rd Tour de Saône-et-Loire
7th Liège–Bastogne–Liège U23
2004
Tour de Nez

2nd Road race
2nd Criterium
5th Time trial

2007
2nd U.S. Open Cycling Championships
2008
1st Stage 1 (TTT) Giro d'Italia
1st Mountains classification, Vuelta a Chihuahua
3rd Univest Grand Prix
2009
8th Overall Univest Grand Prix
2010
6th Overall Tour of Utah
2011
1st Mountains classification, Tour of California
8th Overall Tour of Utah
9th Overall Tour de Beauce
2013
1st Mountains classification, Tour de Beauce
