= Janez Brajkovič =

Slovenian road bicycle racer (born 1983)

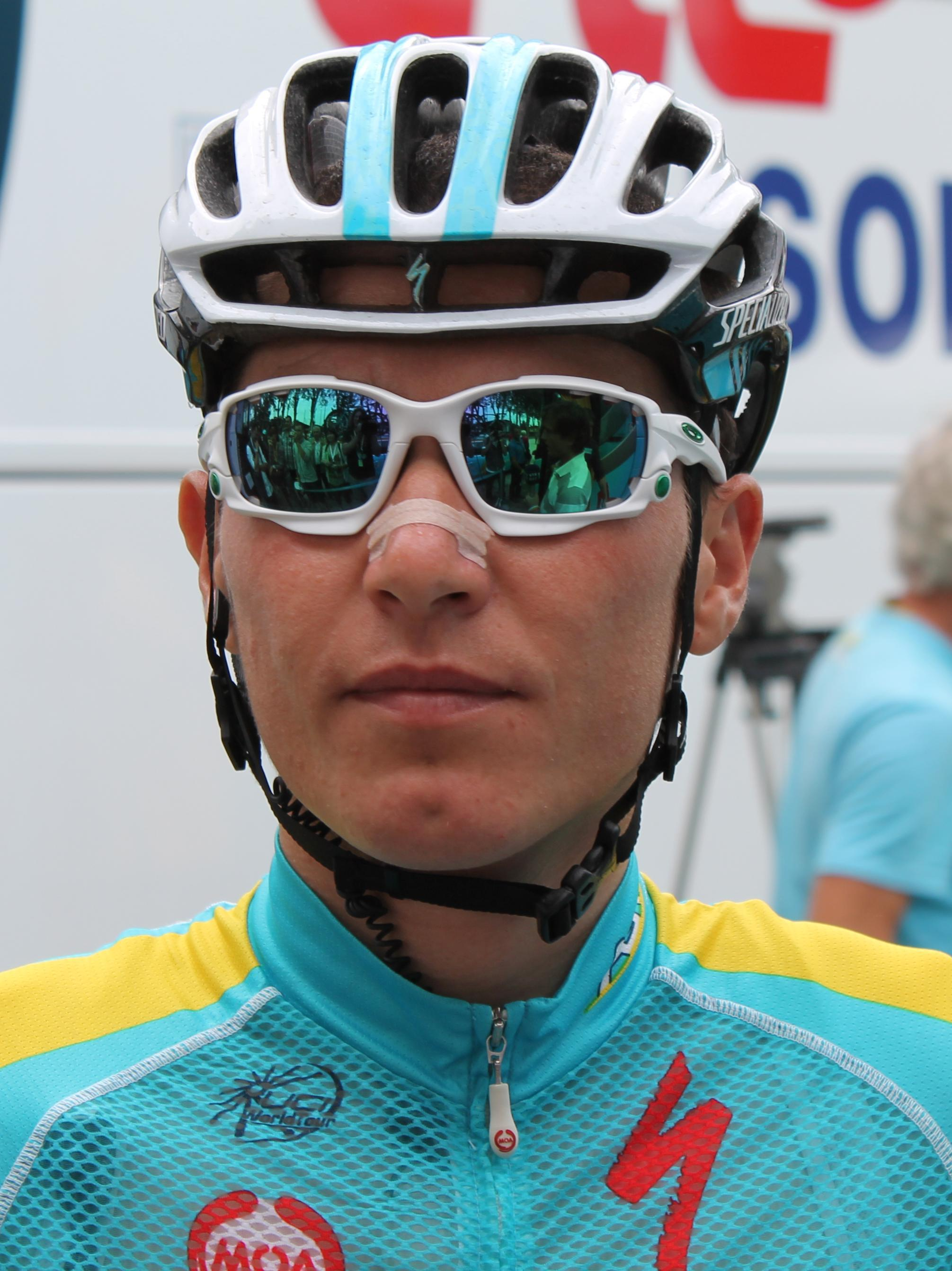
- Brajkovič at the 2012 Tour de France

Personal information
- Full name: Janez Brajkovič
- Nickname: JB Junior (Note: After his shared initials and physical resemblance with Johan Bruyneel)
- Born: 18 December 1983 (age 42) Metlika, Slovenia
- Height: 1.77 m (5 ft 9 1/2 in)
- Weight: 60 kg (132 lb; 9 st 6 lb)

Cycling career
- Sport: Cycling
- Discipline: Road
- Role: Rider
- Rider type: Time-trialist

Professional teams
- 2005: KRKA–Adria Mobil
- 2005–2007: Discovery Channel
- 2008–2009: Astana
- 2010–2011: Team RadioShack
- 2012–2014: Astana
- 2015–2016: UnitedHealthcare
- 2017: Bahrain–Merida
- 2018–2020: Adria Mobil

Major wins
- Grand Tours Vuelta a España 1 TTT stage (2013) Stage races Critérium du Dauphiné (2010) Tour de Georgia (2007) Tour of Slovenia (2012) One-day races and Classics National Time Trial Championships (2009, 2011)

Janez "Jani" Brajkovič (born 18 December 1983) is a racing cyclist from Metlika, Slovenia, who most recently rode for UCI Continental team Adria Mobil. He was the world under-23 Time Trial champion in 2004.

In 2018, while riding for the Adria Mobil team, Brajkovič was suspended after a positive anti-doping test. He was banned for just over a year, and once his suspension was complete, he rejoined the Adria Mobil team.

== Career ==
Before he turned professional, Brajkovič won the under-23 world time trial title in 2004 by beating pre-race favourite Thomas Dekker (formerly of Lotto–Domo) by 18 seconds, with a time of 46:56.39 – an average speed of 46.975 kilometres per hour (29.189 miles per hour).

=== Discovery Channel (2005–2007) ===
Brajkovič joined Discovery Channel midway through the 2005 season. Brajkovič was signed up as a first year professional but missed the first half of the season due to contractual obligations; he was still contracted with KRKA–Adria Mobil. In July he turned professional and made his début at the Eneco Tour and had a brilliant début start. He finished 7th in the time trial, helped sprinter Max van Heeswijk win two stages, and finished in the top 20 overall in a race won by Bobby Julich of Team CSC. But to prove it was no fluke he finished 14th in the time trial in the Deutschland Tour, and eleventh in the road race at the UCI Road World Championships.

Brajkovič started 2006 impressively as well, finishing 4th in the final time trial of Tour de Suisse to take 5th overall in the general classification. Before that, in the Volta a Catalunya, he took 3rd in the stage 1 time trial, and finished 5th overall just 48 seconds down on race winner David Cañada (Saunier Duval–Prodir). He did not get to ride the Tour de France, but raced the Vuelta a España where he finished second on the first mountain stage, after getting beaten by Danilo Di Luca in the sprint at the summit. After finishing fourth in the second mountain stage to the Puerto de El Morredero, he took the lead in the general classification, giving him the leader's jersey in a major tour for the first time.

On 22 April 2007 Brajkovič won the Tour de Georgia for his first win as a professional. He then endured a dry spell where he further acclimatised to regular top-level competition before finishing second to Damiano Cunego at the Giro di Lombardia end of season classic.

=== Astana (2008–2009) ===
In 2008 Brajkovič raced in the Tour of California, the Vuelta a Murcia, Settimana Ciclistica Lombarda, the Volta a Catalunya, the Critérium du Dauphiné Libéré, the Slovenian National Road Race Championships, the Tour of Austria, the Deutschland Tour, the UCI Road World Championships, the Military World Championship, the Coppa Sabatini, the Giro dell'Emilia, the Gran Premio Bruno Beghelli and the Giro di Lombardia.

In 2009, Brajkovič took the leader's jersey in Stage 2 of the Giro del Trentino and held it until Ivan Basso took it on the final climb in Stage 4. Showing strong form, he rode in support of Levi Leipheimer in the Giro d'Italia.

=== Team RadioShack (2010–2011) ===
Following the 2009 season, Brajkovič left Astana for Team RadioShack, joining many of his former Astana teammates and manager Johan Bruyneel. During the 2010 season, he won the Critérium du Dauphiné after being able to follow Tour de France champion Alberto Contador in the mountains and besting him in the longer time trial of the race. Following this victory, he was selected by the team to ride in his first Tour de France, mainly to support Lance Armstrong.

His 2011 Tour de France with Team RadioShack ended early on stage 5 after a crash prevented him from finishing.

=== Astana (2012–2014) ===
On 30 September 2011, it was announced that Brajkovič would be returning to Astana for the 2012 season. He won the Tour of Slovenia in 2012. Brajkovic later rode the Tour de France where he ended up finishing 9th overall.

After having a relatively quiet 2013 season, Brajkovič wore the red leader's jersey after his team won the stage 1 team time trial in the Vuelta a España. He wore it for one day and then lost it to teammate Vincenzo Nibali.

The 2014 season was statistically the worst year of Brajkovič's career. He failed to record a stage win for the first time, which was attributed to many injuries and illnesses.

=== UnitedHealthcare (2015–2016) ===
On 29 October 2014, it was announced that Brajkovič would be joining professional continental team UnitedHealthcare after 3 seasons at Astana. Brajkovič expressed an interest in wanting to return and ride in the United States for his third different American team.

=== Bahrain–Merida (2017) ===
Brajkovič joined newly formed team Bahrain–Merida for the 2017 season.

=== Adria Mobil (2018–2020) ===
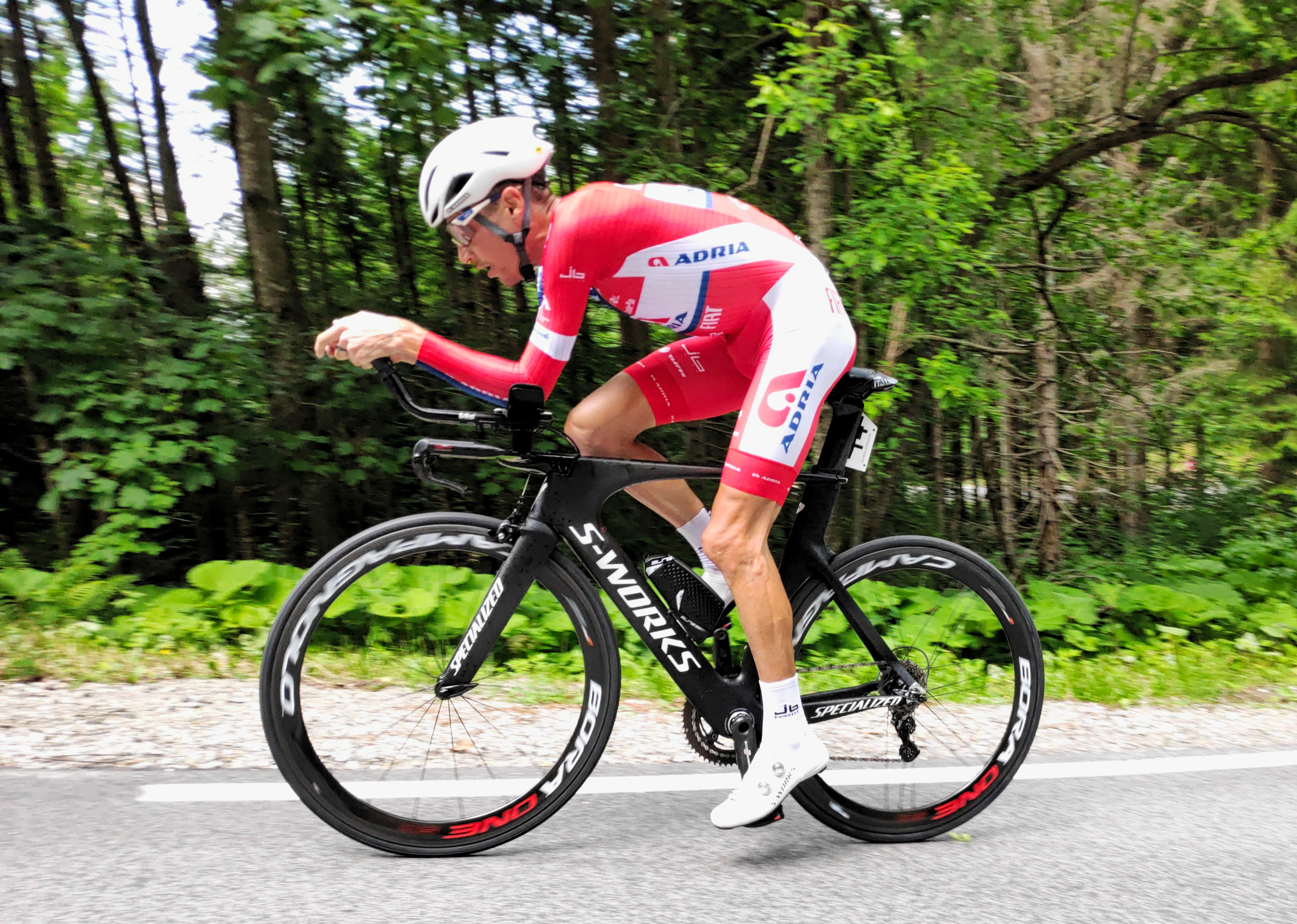
Brajkovič at the 2020 Slovenian National Time Trial Championships. He finished fourth in the event, having also finished fourth in the Slovenian National Road Race Championships a week prior.

After an unsuccessful 2017 season, Brajkovič rejoined his first professional team Adria Mobil. In July 2018 the Union Cycliste Internationale (UCI) informed the team about a positive anti-doping test for methylhexanamine recorded by Brajkovič. Brajkovič could have received a ban of up to two years, but this was reduced to ten months by the UCI. He initially did not extend his contract beyond the end of 2018.

After his suspension ended in September 2019, he re-signed with Adria Mobil. His first race was the 2.1-classified CRO Race.

== Personal life ==
After his doping sentence, Brajkovič took to his personal website on 8 August 2019 to discuss his suffering with an eating disorder. He alleged that his positive test was the result of methylhexanamine contained in a food supplement he took while not being able to eat properly. He stated that he knew numerous fellow professional cyclists who suffered from the condition as well and that too little was done to prevent it.

== Major results ==
2003
7th Overall Giro delle Regioni
2004
1st Time trial, UCI Under-23 Road World Championships
National Under-23 Road Championships

1st Road race
1st Time trial

1st Trofeo Banca Popolare di Vicenza
2nd Time trial, UEC European Under-23 Road Championships
2nd Overall Grand Prix Guillaume Tell

1st Stage 4a (ITT)

2nd Gran Premio Palio del Recioto
3rd Giro del Belvedere
4th Overall Tour de Berlin
5th Overall Tour of Slovenia
2005
1st Stage 3 Jadranska Magistrala
3rd Time trial, UEC European Under-23 Road Championships
5th Overall Tour of Slovenia

1st Young rider classification

5th Gran Premio Palio del Recioto
8th Trofeo Zsšdi
9th Overall Giro del Trentino
9th Giro d'Oro
2006
5th Overall Tour de Georgia

1st Young rider classification

5th Overall Volta a Catalunya
5th Overall Tour de Suisse
9th Overall Vuelta a Castilla y León
Vuelta a España

Held after Stages 7–8

2007 (1 pro win)
1st Overall Tour de Georgia

1st Young rider classification

4th Overall Volta a la Comunitat Valenciana
5th Overall Tirreno–Adriatico
10th Overall Tour de Romandie
10th Overall Volta a Catalunya
2008
2nd Giro di Lombardia
3rd Overall Deutschland Tour
7th Overall Volta a Catalunya
7th Overall Tour of Austria
8th Time trial, UCI Road World Championships
8th Overall Tour de l'Ain
2009 (1)
National Road Championships

1st Time trial
3rd Road race

2nd Overall Giro del Trentino
6th Time trial, UCI Road World Championships
2010 (2)
1st Overall Critérium du Dauphiné

1st Stage 3 (ITT)

4th Overall Giro di Sardegna
4th Overall Vuelta a Castilla y León
5th Overall Tour de Romandie
8th Classica Sarda
9th Overall Volta a Catalunya
9th Overall Tour of California
2011 (1)
1st Time trial, National Road Championships
3rd Overall Tour of Utah
7th Overall Paris–Nice
7th Overall Tour de Romandie
9th Overall Critérium du Dauphiné
2012 (2)
1st Overall Tour of Slovenia
1st Stage 3 Volta a Catalunya
5th Overall USA Pro Cycling Challenge
7th Overall Critérium du Dauphiné
9th Overall Tour de France
9th Overall Tour de Romandie
10th Time trial, Olympic Games
2013
Vuelta a España

1st Stage 1 (TTT)
Held after Stage 1

2014
3rd Overall Vuelta a Burgos
2015
4th Overall Abu Dhabi Tour
5th Overall Tour of the Gila
2016
8th Overall Tour of the Gila
9th Overall Tour of Slovenia
2018
8th Overall Tour of Slovenia
2020
6th Overall Tour de Hongrie
8th Overall Giro della Regione Friuli Venezia Giulia

=== General classification results timeline ===
Grand Tour general classification results
Grand Tour	2006	2007	2008	2009	2010	2011	2012	2013	2014	2015	2016	2017
Giro d'Italia	—	—	—	18	—	—	—	—	DNF	—	—	—
Tour de France	—	—	—	—	43	DNF	9	DNF	—	—	—	45
/ Vuelta a España	30	DNF	—	—	—	22	—	26	—	—	—	—
Major stage race general classification results
Race	2006	2007	2008	2009	2010	2011	2012	2013	2014	2015	2016	2017
Paris–Nice	—	—	—	—	11	7	56	—	—	—	—	—
/ Tirreno–Adriatico	—	5	—	DNF	—	—	—	50	62	—	—	—
Volta a Catalunya	5	10	7	—	9	15	44	—	—	—	—	85
Tour of the Basque Country	17	—	—	40	—	—	DNF	DNF	45	—	—	56
Tour de Romandie	—	10	—	—	5	7	9	23	DNF	—	—	51
Critérium du Dauphiné	—	—	46	—	1	9	7	—	—	—	—	24
Tour de Suisse	5	DNF	—	—	—	—	—	14	—	—	—	—

Legend
—	Did not compete
DNF	Did not finish
