= 2011 Hel van het Mergelland =

Race details
- Dates: 2 April 2011
- Stages: 1
- Distance: 196 km (121.8 mi)
- Winning time: 5h 00' 39"

Results
	Winner	Pim Ligthart (NED)
	Second	Federico Canuti (ITA)
	Third	Samuel Dumoulin (FRA)

The 2011 Hel van het Mergelland was the 38th edition of the Volta Limburg Classic cycle race and was held on 2 April 2011. The race started and finished in Eijsden. The race was won by Pim Ligthart.

== General classification ==
Final general classification

Rank	Rider	Time
1	Pim Ligthart (NED)	5h 00' 39"
2	Federico Canuti (ITA)	+ 0"
3	Samuel Dumoulin (FRA)	+ 0"
4	Simon Geschke (GER)	+ 0"
5	Marcello Pavarin (ITA)	+ 0"
6	Giovanni Visconti (ITA)	+ 0"
7	Edwig Cammaerts (BEL)	+ 0"
8	Thierry Hupond (FRA)	+ 0"
9	Bert De Waele (BEL)	+ 0"
10	David Tanner (AUS)	+ 0"
