= Jeff Louder =

American racing cyclist

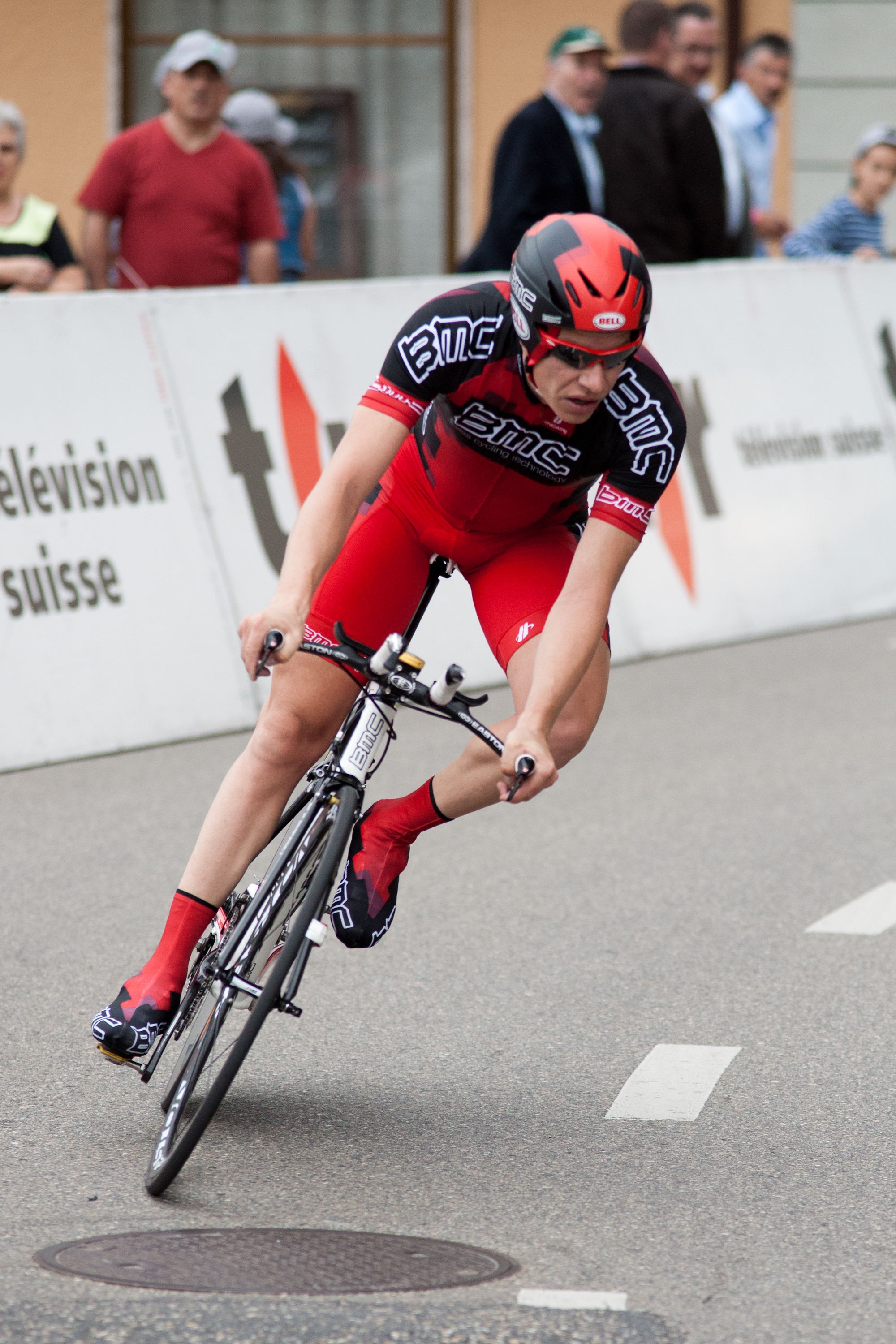
- Louder at the 2010 Tour de Romandie

Personal information
- Full name: Jeff Louder
- Born: December 8, 1977 (age 48) Salt Lake City, Utah, U.S.
- Height: 1.83 m (6 ft 0 in)
- Weight: 73 kg (161 lb; 11.5 st)

Cycling career
- Sport: Cycling
- Current team: Retired
- Discipline: Road
- Role: Rider
- Rider type: All-rounder

Professional teams
- 2000–2002: Tönissteiner–Colnago
- 2003–2005: Navigators
- 2006–2007: Health Net–Maxxis
- 2008–2011: BMC Racing Team
- 2012–2014: UnitedHealthcare

Major wins
- Tour of Utah (2008); Redlands Bicycle Classic (2009)

Jeff Louder (born December 8, 1977) is an American former professional road racing cyclist, who rode professionally between 2000 and 2014 for the Landbouwkrediet–Colnago, Navigators Insurance, BMC Racing Team and UnitedHealthcare teams. Originally from Salt Lake City, Utah, Louder won the 2008 Tour of Utah, and took part in the 2010 Giro d'Italia. At the 2014 Tour of Utah Louder announced that he would be retiring from the sport at the end of the season.

== Major results ==
2003
8th, Grand Prix Pino Cerami
2004
2nd, Overall, Cascade Cycling Classic
3rd, Overall, Tour of Qinghai Lake

1st, Stage 2

2005
2nd, National Time Trial Championships
3rd, Overall, Cascade Cycling Classic
3rd, Overall, Tour de Beauce

1st, Mountains classification

2006
2nd, Overall, Cascade Cycling Classic
3rd, Overall, Tour of Utah
4th, Overall, Tour de Taiwan
2007
1st, Mountains classification, Tour of Missouri
1st, Stage 5, Cascade Cycling Classic
7th, Overall, Tour de Georgia
2008
1st, Overall, Tour of Utah

1st, Stage 4

1st, Stage 2, Redlands Bicycle Classic
2nd, Overall, Cascade Cycling Classic

1st, Stage 4

2009
1st, Overall, Redlands Bicycle Classic

1st, Stage 1

3rd, Overall, Cascade Cycling Classic
3rd, Overall, Tour of Utah
3rd, National Road Race Championships
2010
1st, Stage 4, Tour of Utah
2011
10th, Overall, Tour of Utah
2012
6th, Tour of the Battenkill
