= Jesse Anthony =

American cyclo-cross cyclist and bicycle racer

Personal information
- Full name: Jesse D. Anthony
- Born: June 12, 1985 (age 41) Beverly, Massachusetts

Cycling career
- Sport: Cycling
- Current team: Retired
- Disciplines: Road; Cyclo-cross
- Role: Rider

Professional teams
- 2006–2007: Kodakgallery.com–Sierra Nevada
- 2008–2009: Team Type 1
- 2010–2018: Kelly Benefit Strategies

Jesse D. Anthony (born June 12, 1985 in Beverly, Massachusetts) is an American former professional road cyclist and cyclo-cross racer, who rode professionally between 2006 and 2018 for the Kodakgallery.com–Sierra Nevada, Team Type 1 and Rally Cycling teams. Anthony used to work for USA Cycling as their cyclo-cross manager.

== Major results ==
2007
4th Overall Rás Tailteann
2010
1st Overall Festningsrittet
2nd Overall Tour de Korea
2011
1st Overall Nature Valley Grand Prix
1st Stage 1 Tour of Utah
9th Overall Jelajah Malaysia
2012
1st Stage 5 Cascade Cycling Classic
2nd Tour of the Battenkill
2013
2nd Philadelphia International Championship
2014
1st Tour de Delta
3rd Bucks County Classic
9th Winston-Salem Cycling Classic
2015
3rd Clássica Loulé
4th Winston-Salem Cycling Classic
2016
Tour de Guadeloupe

1st Points classification
1st Stages 3 & 9

2017
5th Overall Tour de Normandie

2025
Platoon Leader of the 25-02 Fire Recruit Academy (10/1/2025-11/1/2025)
