= 2007 Tour de Georgia =

2006–2007 UCI America Tour

Race details
- Dates: April 16 – April 22
- Stages: 7
- Distance: 1,058.8 km (657.9 mi)
- Winning time: 25h 26' 33"

Results
	Winner	Janez Brajkovič (SLO)	(Discovery Channel)
	Second	Christian Vande Velde (USA)	(Team CSC)
	Third	David Cañada (ESP)	(Saunier Duval–Prodir)
	Points	Juan José Haedo (ARG)	(Team CSC)
	Mountains	Ryder Hesjedal (CAN)	(Health Net)
	Youth	Janez Brajkovič (SLO)	(Discovery Channel)
	Team	Discovery Channel	

The 2007 Tour de Georgia was a seven-stage professional bicycle race held from April 16 through April 22, 2007 across the state of Georgia and into Tennessee. The race was part of the 2007 USA Cycling Pro Tour. The race was the highest ranked event of the 2006–2007 UCI America Tour.

The 2007 race began in Peachtree City, and crossed parts of north Georgia, including climbing stages that went to Lookout Mountain, Tennessee and Brasstown Bald, the highest point of elevation in Georgia. The final stage was a circuit in the streets of Atlanta, and ended at Centennial Olympic Park.

== Stages ==
Stage	Route	Distance	Type	Date	Stage Winner	Team	Race Leader
1	Peachtree City – Macon	153 km 95.1 miles	Flat stage	April 16	(Italy) Daniele Contrini	(Italy) Tinkoff Credit Systems	(Italy) Daniele Contrini
2	Thomaston – Rome	217.2 km 134.8 miles	Flat stage	April 17	(Serbia and Montenegro) Ivan Stević	(United States) Toyota–United	(Italy) Daniele Contrini
3	Rome – Chattanooga	190.2 km 118.2 miles	Flat stage	April 18	(Belgium) Gianni Meersman	(United States) Discovery Channel	(Spain) David Cañada
4	Chickamauga - Lookout Mountain	30.4 km 18.9 miles	Mountain ITT	April 19	(United States) Levi Leipheimer	(United States) Discovery Channel	(Slovenia) Janez Brajkovič
5	Dalton – Brasstown Bald	172.1 km 106.9 miles	Mountain stage	April 20	(United States) Levi Leipheimer	(United States) Discovery Channel	(Slovenia) Janez Brajkovič
6	Lake Lanier Islands - Stone Mountain Park	182.9 km 113.6 miles	Flat stage	April 21	(United States) Fred Rodriguez	(Belgium) Predictor–Lotto	(Slovenia) Janez Brajkovič
7	Atlanta	123.9 km 77 miles	Circuit stage	April 22	(Argentina) Juan José Haedo	(Denmark) Team CSC	(Slovenia) Janez Brajkovič
Overall							(Slovenia) Janez Brajkovič

== Final standings ==
=== General classification ===
	Cyclist	Country	Team	Time
1	Janez Brajkovič	Slovenia	Discovery Channel	25h 26' 33"
2	Christian Vande Velde	United States	Team CSC	+ 0'12"
3	David Cañada	Spain	Saunier Duval–Prodir	+3'04"
4	Rubens Bertogliati	Switzerland	Saunier Duval–Prodir	+3'06"
5	Kevin Seeldraeyers	Belgium	Quick-Step–Innergetic	+4'22"
6	Scott Nydam	United States	BMC Racing Team	+5'35"
7	Jeff Louder	United States	Health Net – Maxxis	+6'00"
8	Timothy Johnson	United States	Health Net – Maxxis	+6'59"
9	Lucas Euser	United States	Team Slipstream	+10'08"
10	Ivan Santaromita	Switzerland	Quick-Step–Innergetic	+12'15"

=== Mountains classification ===
	Cyclist	Country	Team	Points
1	Ryder Hesjedal	Canada	Health Net – Maxxis	18
2	Anthony Colby	United States	Colavita–Sutter Home	15
3	Levi Leipheimer	United States	Discovery Channel	12

=== Points classification ===
Also known as the Sprint classification.

	Cyclist	Country	Team	Points
1	Juan José Haedo	Argentina	Team CSC	41
2	Fred Rodriguez	United States	Predictor–Lotto	37
3	Sergey Lagutin	Uzbekistan	Navigators Insurance; Cycling Team	26

=== Team classification ===
	Team	Country	Time
1	Discovery Channel	United States	76h 41'52"
2	Health Net – Maxxis	United States	+8' 42"
3	Saunier Duval–Prodir	Spain	+10'42"
