= Thomas Rabou =

Dutch bicycle racer

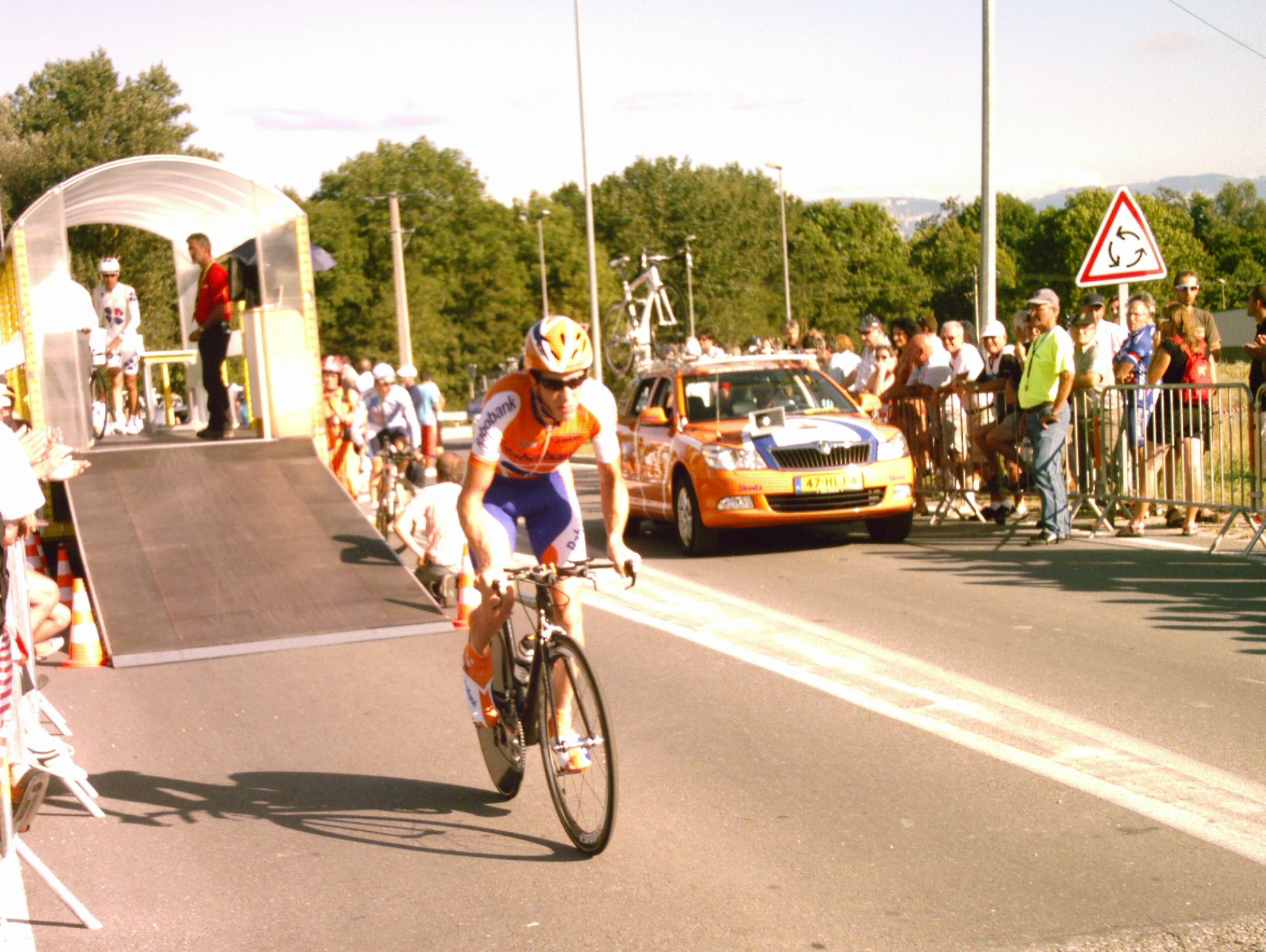
- Rabou at the 2009 Tour de l'Ain

Personal information
- Full name: Thomas Rabou
- Born: 12 December 1983 (age 42) 's-Hertogenbosch, Netherlands
- Height: 181 cm (5 ft 11 in)
- Weight: 66 kg (146 lb)

Cycling career
- Sport: Cycling
- Current team: Retired
- Discipline: Road
- Role: Rider
- Rider type: Climber

Professional teams
- 2005: Team Konica Minolta
- 2006: Marco Polo
- 2007–2009: Rabobank Continental Team
- 2010: Team Type 1
- 2011–2012: Realcyclist.com Cycling Team
- 2013–2014: OCBC Singapore Continental Cycling Team
- 2015: Attaque Team Gusto
- 2016–2017: Wisdom–Hengxiang Cycling Team

Thomas Rabou (born 12 December 1983) is a Dutch former professional cyclist, who rode professionally between 2005 and 2017.

== Major results ==
2006
1st Overall Tour of Siam
2nd Overall Tour de la Pharmacie Centrale

1st Stage 2

8th Overall Tour of Hainan
2008
1st Stage 5a (TTT) Volta a Lleida
1st Stage 2 Cinturó de l'Empordà
2009
8th Overall Les 3 Jours de Vaucluse
10th Overall Tour Alsace
2010
Tour of California

1st Mountains classification
Most courageous rider, Stage 2

2012
1st Stage 3 Vuelta Mexico Telmex
2013
3rd Melaka Governor's Cup
5th Overall Tour de Korea
9th Overall Tour de Filipinas

1st Mountains classification

2014
1st Critérium International d'Alger
3rd GP de la Ville d'Oran
4th Overall Tour de Blida

1st Stage 2

7th Overall New Zealand Cycle Classic
2015
1st Stage 3 Tour de Kumano
1st Stage 7 Tour de Singkarak
6th Overall Tour of Taihu Lake
2016
6th Overall Tour of China II

1st Prologue
