= César Grajales =

Colombian cyclist

Personal information
- Full name: César Augusto Grajales Calle
- Born: 6 May 1973 (age 53) Manizales, Colombia

Cycling career
- Sport: Cycling
- Current team: Retired
- Discipline: Road
- Role: Rider

Professional teams
- 2002–2004: Jittery Joe's
- 2005–2006: Navigators Insurance
- 2007: The Jittery Joe's Pro Cycling Team
- 2008: Rock Racing
- 2010: Bahati Foundation Pro Cycling Team
- 2011: Realcyclist.com Cycling Team

César Augusto Grajales Calle (born 6 May 1973) is a Colombian former professional road cyclist.

== Major results ==
2004
2nd Overall Redlands Bicycle Classic
6th Overall Tour of Georgia

1st Stage 4

2005
4th Overall Tour de Langkawi
2006
1st Overall Edgar Soto Memorial

1st Stage 1

4th Overall Tour de Langkawi
10th Overall Tour of Georgia
2007
1st Stage 3 San Dimas Stage Race
2010
1st Stage 6 Tour of Atlanta
9th Overall Tour of Utah
2011
1st Stages 1 & 3 Cascade Cycling Classic
