= David Tanner (cyclist) =

Australian cyclist

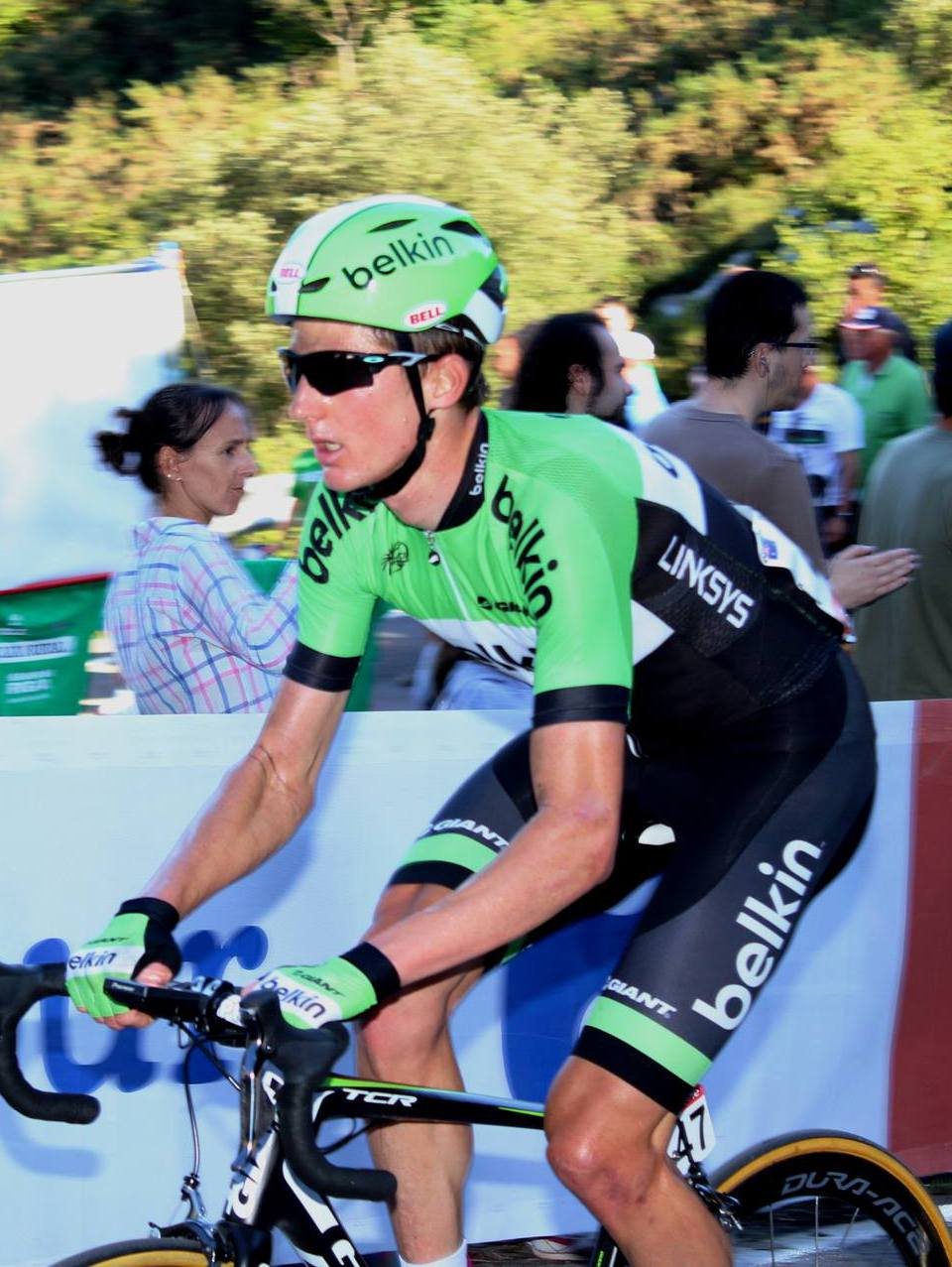
- Tanner at the 2013 Vuelta a España

Personal information
- Full name: David Tanner
- Born: 30 September 1984 (age 42) Melbourne, Australia
- Height: 1.84 m (6 ft 0 in)
- Weight: 70 kg (154 lb)

Cycling career
- Sport: Cycling
- Current team: Retired
- Discipline: Road
- Role: Rider
- Rider type: Sprinter

Professional teams
- 2009: Rock Racing
- 2010: Fly V Australia
- 2011–2012: Saxo Bank–SunGard
- 2013–2014: Blanco Pro Cycling
- 2015–2016: IAM Cycling
- 2017–2018: Vérandas Willems–Crelan

David Tanner (born 30 September 1984) is an Australian former professional road cyclist, who rode professionally between 2009 and 2018 for six different teams.

== Career ==
In December 2014 he was announced as part of the squad for the IAM Cycling team for 2015, alongside fellow Belkin Pro Cycling rider Stef Clement. In September 2016, shortly before the disbanding of the IAM squad, Tanner suffered multiple injuries after being hit by a car whilst training, resulting in him spending three weeks in intensive care. The following year he joined the Vérandas Willems–Crelan team in July, after agreeing a deal to the end of the year with team manager Nick Nuyens, Tanner's former teammate at Saxo Bank–SunGard.

== Major results ==
2005
2nd Boucle de l'Artois
5th Overall Circuit des Ardennes
10th Grand Prix de Waregem
2007
2nd Overall Tour du Gévaudan

1st Stage 1

2nd La Roue Tourangelle
3rd Overall Ronde de l'Oise
4th Boucle de l'Artois
2008
4th Overall Boucles de la Mayenne
4th Gran Premio Città di Camaiore
2009
10th Overall Herald Sun Tour
2010
Tour of Utah

1st Sprints classification
1st Stage 1

1st Stage 2 Tour de Beauce
2nd Overall Tour of China

1st Stage 2

2011
5th Overall Ster ZLM Toer
10th Hel van het Mergelland
2015
1st Stage 2 Tour of Austria
9th Gran Premio di Lugano
2016
3rd Grand Prix of Aargau Canton
