= Phil Zajicek =

American road racing cyclist

Personal information
- Full name: Philip Zajicek
- Nickname: "PZ"
- Born: March 20, 1979 (age 47) Eugene, Oregon, U.S.
- Height: 5 ft 9 in (1.75 m)
- Weight: 140 lb (64 kg)

Cycling career
- Sport: Cycling
- Current team: suspended for life
- Discipline: Road
- Role: Rider
- Rider type: All-around

Professional teams
- 2000–2002: Mercury Cycling Team
- 2003: Saturn Cycling Team
- 2004–2007: Navigators Insurance
- 2008: Health Net presented by Maxxis
- 2009–2010: Fly V Australia

Phil Zajicek (born March 20, 1979, in Eugene, Oregon) is an American ex-professional road racing cyclist who last rode professionally for the Fly V Australia Team in 2010. On June 10, 2011, the US Anti-Doping Agency (USADA) announced that Zajicek had accepted a life-ban from competition.

== Career summary ==
Zajicek, a former Junior National Champion, and a Boulder, Colorado, resident, competed throughout the United States and was known as one of the country's top domestic riders, finishing ahead of Lance Armstrong and Levi Leipheimer in Stage 5 of the 2009 Tour of the Gila. Climbing nearly 10,000 feet over 100 miles, through the Continental Divide and the high desert plains and mountains of New Mexico, Zajicek was the only athlete able to match and set pace with Armstrong and Leipheimer, besting both by multiple bicycle lengths in the final uphill sprint, after nearly 5 hours of aggressive racing as Armstrong and Leipheimer prepared for that year's Tour de France, two months later, where Armstrong finished third overall. Stage 5 of the Tour of the Gila, also known as the "Gila Monster Stage", is widely believed to be the most difficult road course in the United States. Zajicek also extensively competed in many of the world's toughest and most renowned Pro Tour Road Races, such as the Midi Libre, Biciclista Vasca, Classique des Alpes, Dauphine Libre, Route du Sud, GP Plouay, and the Tour de L’avenir. Zajicek was a key rider in 2005 for the U.S. National Team during the UCI World Championships in Madrid, Spain. For 2011, Zajicek signed a lucrative professional contract for the ill-fated Pegasus Professional Cycling Team Project, but was left without a team after the Australian squad was denied a Professional UCI License.

== Doping ==
In 2004, USADA reported that Zajicek tested positive for cathine (norpseudoephedrine), at the Tour of Qinghai Lake on July 22, 2004, in China. Zajicek, then 25, was disqualified from his first-place overall finish at the race and fined 666 Swiss francs, but he did not draw a suspension from competition Zajicek steadfastly denied any intention to dope and claimed he consumed an over-the-counter cold medicine that metabolized into a prohibited substance. Cathine is the metabolite of a legal supplement and USADA agreed with this analysis, subsequently modifying their protocols for testing norpseudoephedrine from 2004 onward.

On June 10, 2011, USADA announced that had Zajicek accepted a life-ban from competition due to alleged doping violations. According to USADA CEO Travis T. Tygart, Zajicek also pleaded no contest to a second doping violation for allegedly purchasing erythropoietin (EPO), and pleaded no contest to a third doping offense for allegedly providing false testimony at an American Arbitration Association ("AAA") hearing. The AAA is a private enterprise in the business of arbitrating civil disagreements and is not a court of law, nor does the AAA have any judicial powers. Zajicek was also accused of allegedly encouraging other witnesses to provide inaccurate testimony. Zajicek was fined $5,000, though neither the USADA nor the AAA has any means of collecting funds from athletes. Therefore, it is unlikely Zajicek will ever be required to pay the sum in question, unless he voluntarily decides to pay the fine.

=== Palmares ===
"As a result of the sanction, Zajicek is also disqualified from all competitive results obtained on and subsequent to April 24, 2007, including forfeiture of any medals, points, and prizes."

2009

- 1st Stage 5 Tour of the Gila
- 1st Stage 2 La Vuelta de Bisbee
- 2nd Stage 1 La Vuelta de Bisbee
- 2nd Stage 4a Tour de Beauce
- 2nd Stage 4 Cacade Cycling Classic
- 3rd overall Tour of the Gila
- 3rd Iron Horse Bicycle Classic Road Race
- 7th USPRO Time Trial Championships
- 8th USPRO Road Race Championships

2008

- 1st Sunshine Hill Climb
- 2nd Stage 2 Tour of the Gila
- 10th Overall Tour of Utah

2007

- 2nd overall Redlands
- 13th US Open
- 5th overall La Vuelta de Bisbee
- 1st North Boulder Park Crit
- 1st Ironhorse Bike Classic
- 2nd overall Mt Hood
- 4th overall Nature Valley Grand Prix
- 1st overall Cascade Cycling Classic

2006

- 8th overall Redlands
- 5th overall Tour of the Gila
- 1st overall La Vuelta de Bisbee
- 2nd overall Mt Hood
- 1st stage three Mt Hood
- 7th overall Tour de Nez
- 3rd overall Fitchburg
- 8th US National Road Race Championships
- 4th overall Sun Tour

2005

- 4th overall Tour of Britain (UCI 2.1)
- 2nd stage 1 Cascade Classic
- 7th stage 4 TT Cascade Classic

2004

- 1st overall Tour of QingHai Lake(yellow jersey 4 days)
- 3rd stage 5 QingHai Lake
- 4th Nevada City
- 9th National Time Trial Championships
- 12th overall Tour of Georgia
- 13th overall Cascade
- 23rd overall Tour Down Under

2003

- 4th Montreal Quebec
- 7th Fitchburg
- 11th Sea Otter
- 12th Tour of Georgia
- 32nd Peace Race

2002

- 1st stage one TT Fitchburg
- 2nd stage 6 Tour de Beauce
- 4th Stage 4 TT Tour de Beauce
- 7th overall Tour de Beauce
- 9th Saturn Cycling Classic

2001

- 1st Sprint Competition National Crit Championships
- 7th BMC Austin Criterium

== Riding injury ==
Zajicek had a serious crash in March 2016 while descending Flagstaff Mountain in Boulder, Colorado. His arm was completely severed along with numerous other injuries.

== See also ==
- List of doping cases in cycling
- List of sportspeople sanctioned for doping offences
