= Davide Frattini =

Italian cyclist

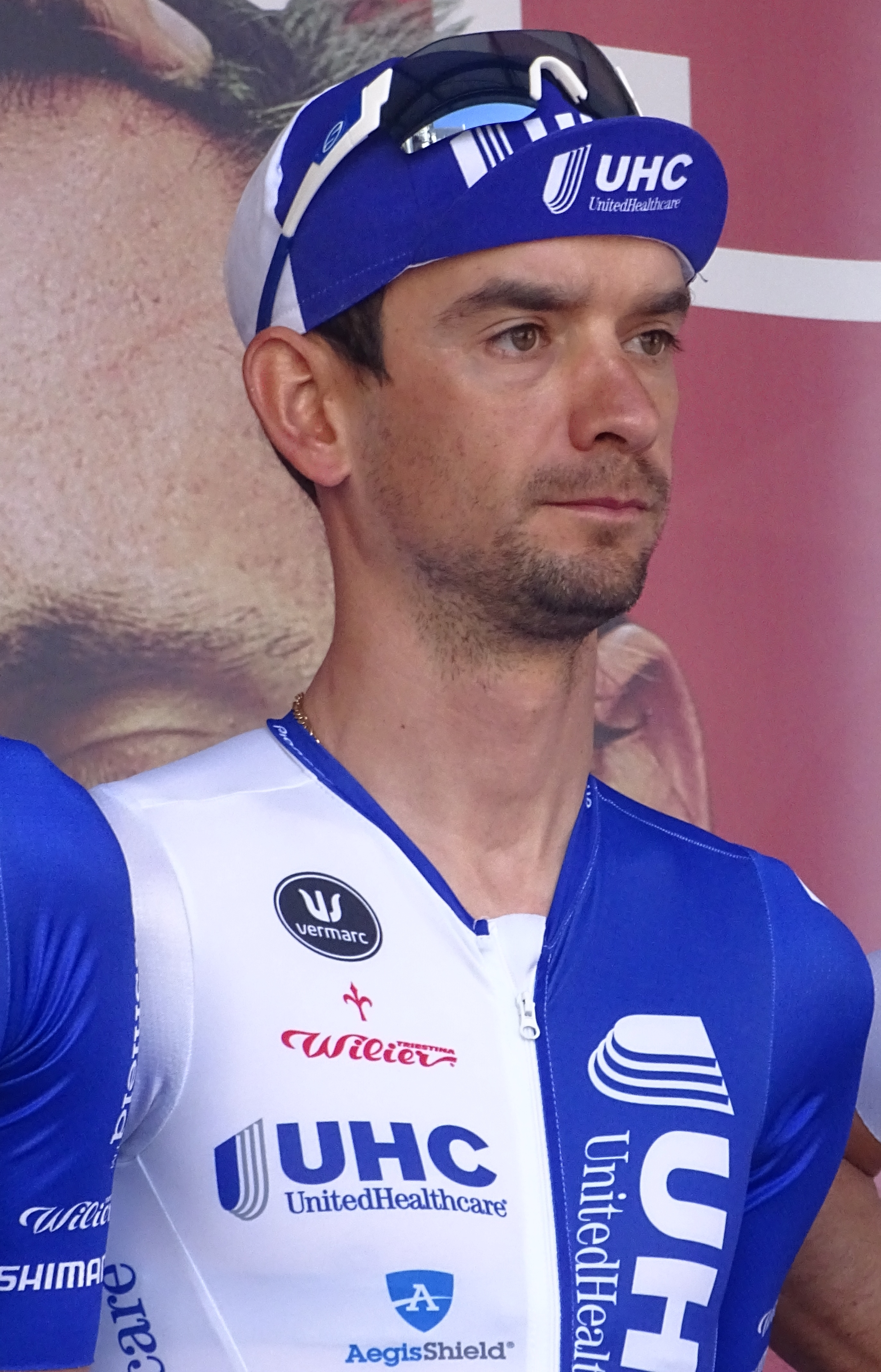
- Frattini in 2015

Personal information
- Born: 6 August 1978 (age 48) Varese
- Height: 1.80 m (5 ft 11 in)
- Weight: 63 kg (139 lb)

Cycling career
- Sport: Cycling
- Current team: Retired
- Disciplines: Road; Cyclo-cross
- Role: Rider
- Rider type: Sprinter

Professional teams
- 2002–2003: Alessio–Bianchi
- 2004: Monex
- 2005–2009: Colavita–Sutter Home
- 2010: Team Type 1
- 2011–2015: UnitedHealthcare

Davide Frattini (born 6 August 1978 in Varese) is an Italian former cyclist. He was raised in a cycling family where his father was sports director at a local club. Since childhood, he followed his brothers Francesco Frattini and Cristiano Frattini, who were also professional cyclists. In 2001, after earning his degree, he won the Baby Giro. The following year he turned professional with the team Alessio–Bianchi.

He has participated in one Grand Tour, the 2003 Vuelta a España, and three Monuments: the 2014 Milan–San Remo and the 2014 and 2015 Paris–Roubaix.

Frattini announced his retirement from competition in October 2015.

== Major results ==
2001
1st Girobio
1st Stage 2 Vuelta a Navarra
2nd Overall, Gran Premio Industria e Commercio Artigianato Carnaghese
2004
1st Tour of Bisbee
3rd Overall Tour of the Gila
2006
1st Chainbiter 8.0 by Benidorm Bikes
2007
1st Highland Park Cyclo-cross
1st USGP of Cyclocross – Mercer Park
2009
4th US Air Force Cycling Classic
2011
1st Charm City Cross 1
4th Bank of America Wilmington GP
