= Cristhian Montoya =

Colombian cyclist

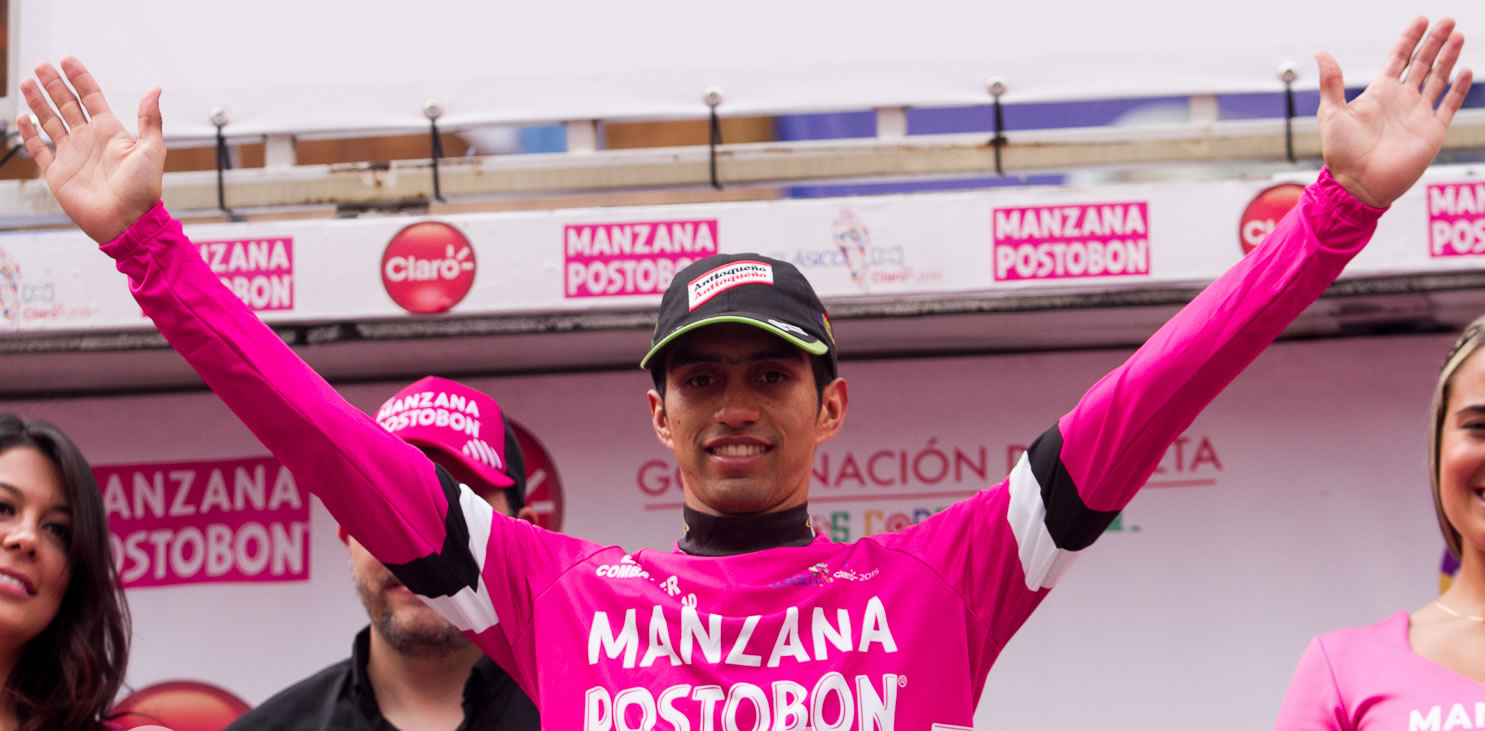
- Montoya in 2015

Personal information
- Full name: Cristhian Montoya Giraldo
- Born: 4 August 1989 (age 37) San Vicente, Antioquia, Colombia

Cycling career
- Sport: Cycling
- Current team: Team Banco Guayaquil–Bianchi
- Discipline: Road
- Role: Rider

Amateur teams
- 2009–2010: Indeportes Antioquia
- 2014: Coldeportes–Claro
- 2016: Aguardiente Antioqueño–Lotería de Medellín–Idea Indeportes Antioquia

Professional teams
- 2011–2012: Gobernación de Antioquia–Indeportes Antioquia
- 2013: Colombia–Coldeportes
- 2015: Orgullo Antioqueño
- 2017–2022: Medellín–Inder
- 2023–: Team Banco Guayaquil–Ecuador

Cristhian Montoya Giraldo (born 4 August 1989) is a Colombian cyclist, who currently rides for UCI Continental team Team Banco Guayaquil–Bianchi.

== Major results ==
2015
1st Mountains classification Tour of the Gila
3rd Overall Clásico RCN

1st Stage 6

10th Overall Joe Martin Stage Race
2016
1st Stage 10 Vuelta a Colombia
2017
1st Mountains classification Tour of Ankara
2nd Overall Vuelta Ciclista de Chile

1st Stage 4

2019
1st Stage 1 (TTT) Tour of Qinghai Lake
3rd Overall Vuelta a la Independencia Nacional

1st Mountains classification

8th Overall Volta a Portugal
9th Overall Tour of the Gila

1st Mountains classification
1st Stage 5

10th Overall Vuelta del Uruguay
2021
8th Overall Joe Martin Stage Race
2022
2nd Overall Vuelta al Ecuador
5th Road race, National Road Championships
2023
4th Overall Tour de Catamarca
