= Rory Sutherland (cyclist) =

Australian racing cyclist

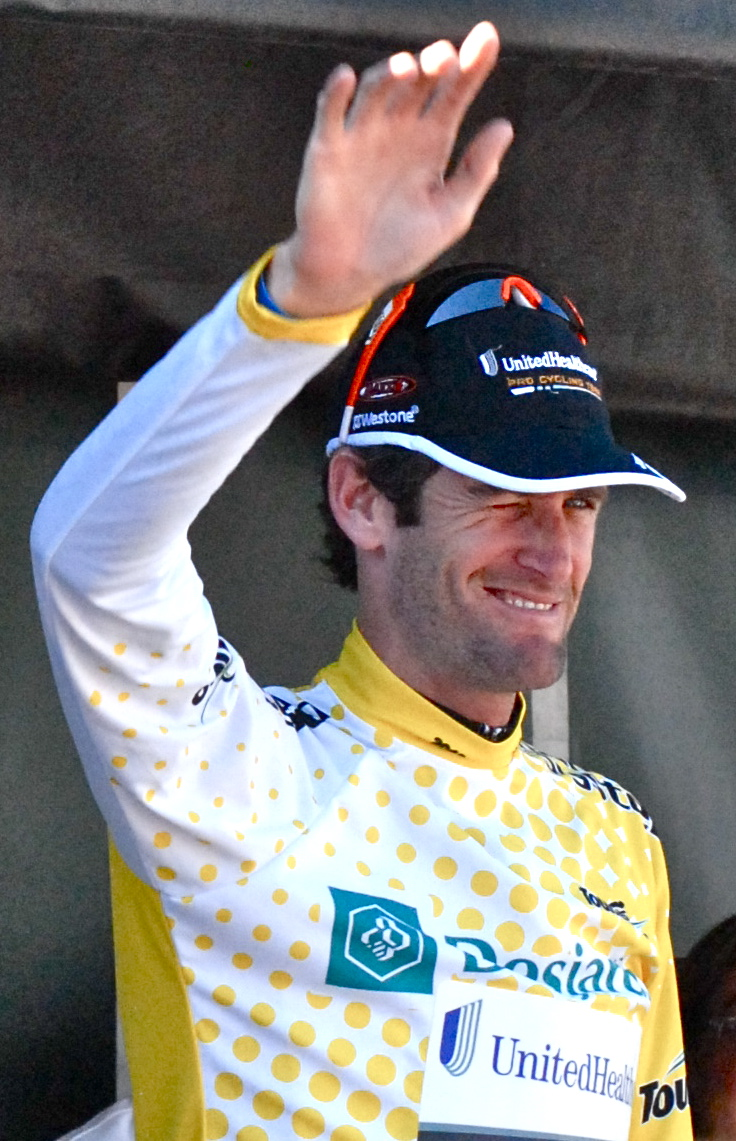
- Sutherland at the 2012 Tour de Beauce

Personal information
- Full name: Rory Sutherland
- Born: 8 February 1982 (age 44) Canberra, Australia
- Height: 1.88 m (6 ft 2 in)
- Weight: 75 kg (165 lb; 11 st 11 lb)

Cycling career
- Sport: Cycling
- Current team: Retired
- Discipline: Road
- Role: Rider

Amateur team
- 2001–2004: Rabobank GS3

Professional teams
- 2005: Rabobank
- 2007–2012: Health Net–Maxxis
- 2013–2014: Saxo–Tinkoff
- 2015–2017: Movistar Team
- 2018–2019: UAE Team Emirates
- 2020: Israel Start-Up Nation

Rory Sutherland (born 8 February 1982) is an Australian former professional road bicycle racer, who rode professionally between 2005 and 2020, for the Rabobank, UnitedHealthcare, Tinkoff–Saxo, Movistar Team, UAE Team Emirates and Israel Start-Up Nation teams.

After retiring, Sutherland became the Elite Road Coordinator for the Australian cycling team.

== Career ==
Born in Canberra, Australia, Sutherland began racing competitively at the age of 14, and rode in Europe with Rabobank GS3 and Rabobank from 2001 to 2005. He tested positive for Clomiphene, which according to some medical experts is not a performance-enhancing drug although it is on the World Anti-Doping Agency's (WADA) banned substance list. In 2006 Sutherland was given a 9-month conditional suspension by the Belgian Cycling Federation, with whom he holds a racing licence. He was named in the start list for the 2015 Vuelta a España. In 2007, he won stages 2 and 3 of the Redlands Bicycle Classic, and also finished 2nd in the Australian National Time Trial Championships.

In July 2018, he was named in the start list for the Tour de France.

== Major results ==
2000
4th Time trial, UCI Junior Road World Championships
2003
2nd Ronde van Vlaanderen U23
6th Overall Ster Elektrotoer
2004
1st Road race, National Under-23 Road Championships
1st Flèche Hesbignonne
2nd Overall Olympia's Tour

1st Stage 9

3rd Overall Le Triptyque des Monts et Châteaux
5th Rund um den Henninger Turm U23
9th Overall Istrian Spring Trophy
2005
2nd Time trial, National Road Championships
3rd Overall Danmark Rundt

1st Young rider classification

3rd Grote Prijs Jef Scherens
9th Schaal Sels
10th Overall Vuelta a Murcia
2007
1st Overall USA Cycling National Racing Calendar
2nd Time trial, National Road Championships
7th Reading Classic
2008
1st Overall Nature Valley Grand Prix

1st Stage 5

1st Overall Joe Martin Stage Race

1st Prologue

1st Overall Mount Hood Cycling Classic

1st Stage 3

1st Prologue Redlands Bicycle Classic
National Road Championships

2nd Time trial
3rd Road race

9th Overall Jayco Bay Cycling Classic
9th Overall Tour de Georgia
2009
1st Overall Joe Martin Stage Race
1st Overall Nature Valley Grand Prix
6th Overall Redlands Bicycle Classic
10th Overall Tour of Missouri
2010
1st Overall Cascade Cycling Classic
1st Overall Nature Valley Grand Prix
7th Overall Tour of California
8th Overall Tour of the Gila
2011
Nature Valley Grand Prix

1st Stages 1 & 6

6th Overall Settimana Internazionale di Coppi e Bartali
7th Overall Tour of California
9th Overall Tour of Elk Grove
10th Overall USA Pro Cycling Challenge
2012
1st Overall Tour of the Gila

1st Stage 1

1st Overall Tour de Beauce
1st Stage 1 Tour of Utah
1st Stage 6 USA Pro Cycling Challenge
9th Bucks County Classic
2013
6th Klasika Primavera
9th Overall USA Pro Cycling Challenge
9th Overall Tour of Turkey
10th Overall Circuit de la Sarthe
2014
5th Grand Prix de Wallonie
2017
1st Vuelta a La Rioja

=== Grand Tour general classification results timeline ===
| Grand Tour | 2005 | 2006 | 2007 | 2008 | 2009 | 2010 | 2011 | 2012 | 2013 | 2014 | 2015 | 2016 | 2017 | 2018 | 2019 | 2020 |
|---|---|---|---|---|---|---|---|---|---|---|---|---|---|---|---|---|
| Giro d'Italia | 108 | — | — | — | — | — | — | — | 97 | — | — | 80 | 108 | — | — | — |
| Tour de France | — | — | — | — | — | — | — | — | — | — | — | — | — | 106 | — | — |
| / Vuelta a España | — | — | — | — | — | — | — | — | — | — | 139 | 130 | — | — | — | 129 |

Legend
| — | Did not compete |
| DNF | Did not finish |
