= Fly V Australia =

V Australia
Team information
- UCI code: VAU
- Registered: Australia
- Founded: 2009
- Disbanded: 2011
- Discipline: Road
- Bicycles: De Rosa

Key personnel
- General manager: Christopher White
- Team manager: Henk Vogels

Team name history
- 2009–2010 2011: Fly V Australia; V Australia

The Fly V Australia (UCI team code: VAU) was an Australian road cycling team. The team was sponsored by Australia airline V Australia, and competed on the UCI Continental Tour. Riders on the team included Jonathan Cantwell, Bernard Sulzberger, Henk Vogels, David Kemp and David Tanner. The team found some success in the USA.
