= 2007 Tour of California =

UCI America Tour
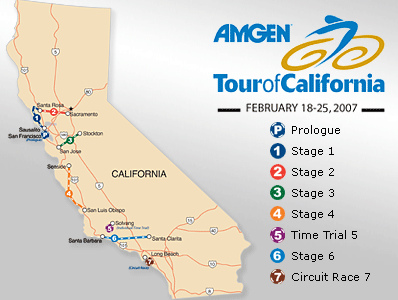
- Map of the 2007 Tour of California

Race details
- Dates: February 18–25, 2007
- Stages: 7+Prologue
- Distance: 650 mi (1,046 km)

Results
Jersey awarded to the overall winner	Winner	Levi Leipheimer (USA)	(Discovery Channel)
	Second	Jens Voigt (GER)	(Team CSC)
	Third	Jason McCartney (USA)	(Discovery Channel)
Jersey awarded to the mountains classification winner	Mountains	Christophe Laurent (FRA)	(Crédit Agricole)
Jersey awarded to the youth classification winner	Youth	Robert Gesink (NED)	(Rabobank)
Jersey awarded to the sprints classification winner	Sprints	Juan José Haedo (ARG)	(Team CSC)
	Team	Team CSC	

The 2007 Tour of California was the second edition of the Tour of California, an eight-day, 650-mile (1,045 km) stage race that passed through the California redwoods, wine country and the Pacific Coast. The road bicycle racing event was held on February 18, 2007. The 2007 Tour of California was part of the 2006–2007 UCI America Tour and the inaugural 2007 USA Cycling Professional Tour.

On November 28, 2006, the UCI upgraded the multi-day event from 2.1 (category 1) to 2.HC (French: Hors Categorie; English: beyond categorization).

== Stages and results ==
=== Prologue: San Francisco ===
The Prologue was an individual time trial held Sunday, February 18, 2007, in San Francisco. Native Californian and last year's prologue champion Levi Leipheimer edged out Colorado's Jason Donald from Slipstream–Chipotle and former NCAA Road Champion Benjamin Jacques-Maynes.

Prologue Result

	Cyclist	Team	Time
1	Levi Leipheimer (USA)	Discovery Channel	4' 49"
2	Jason Donald (USA)	Slipstream–Chipotle	+ 1"
3	Benjamin Jacques-Maynes (USA)	Priority Health–Bissell	+ 5"

General Classification after Prologue

	Cyclist	Team	Time
1	Levi Leipheimer (USA)	Discovery Channel	4' 49"
2	Jason Donald (USA)	Slipstream–Chipotle	+ 1"
3	Benjamin Jacques-Maynes (USA)	Priority Health–Bissell	+ 5"

Mountain Classification after Prologue

	Cyclist	Team	Time
1	Brian Sheedy (USA)	Priority Health–Bissell	4 pts
2	Tom Peterson (USA)	Slipstream–Chipotle	3 pts
3	Michael Jones (USA)	Jelly Belly Cycling Team	2 pts

=== Stage 1: Sausalito to Santa Rosa ===
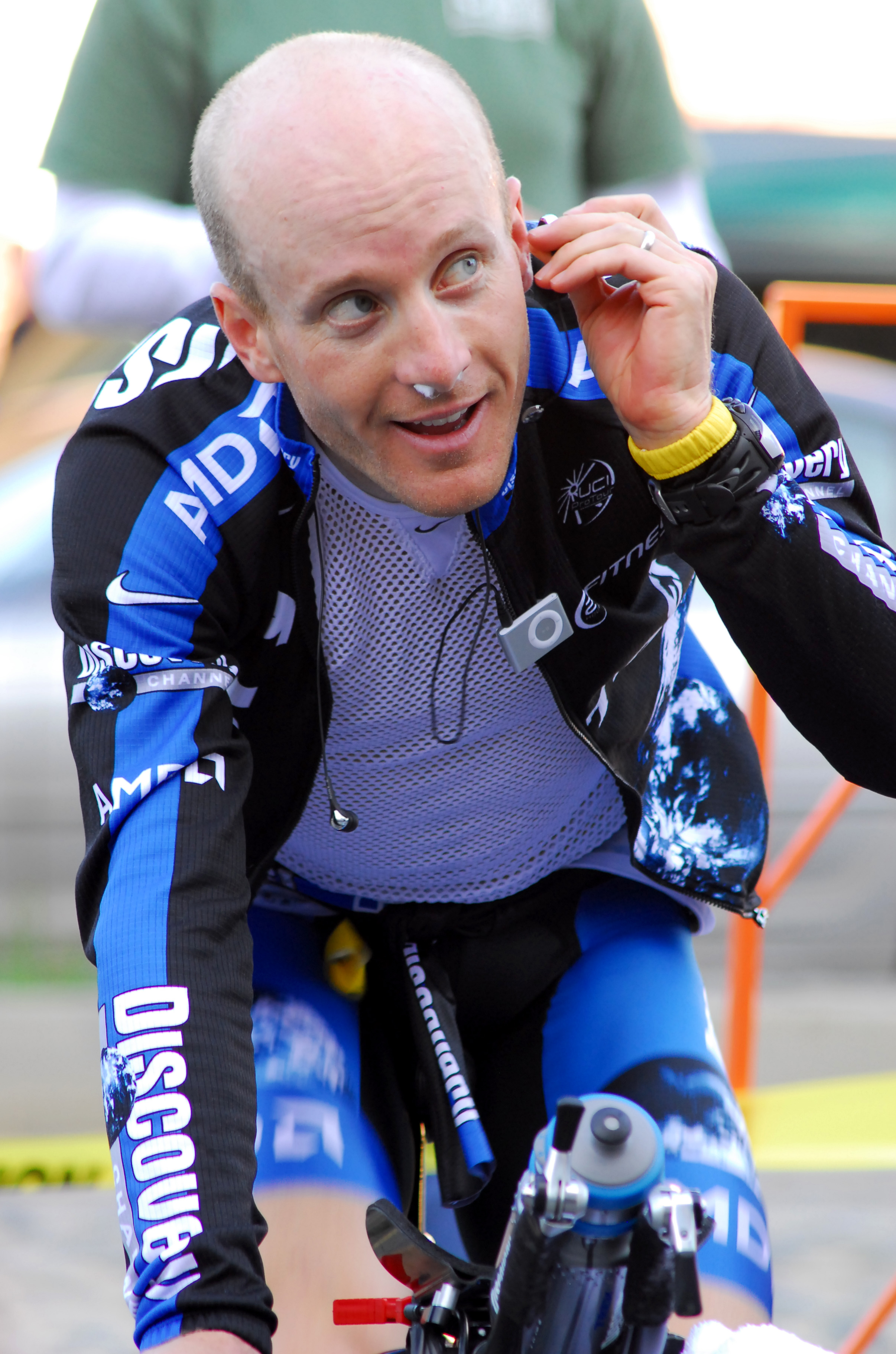
Levi Leipheimer on 2007 Tour of California

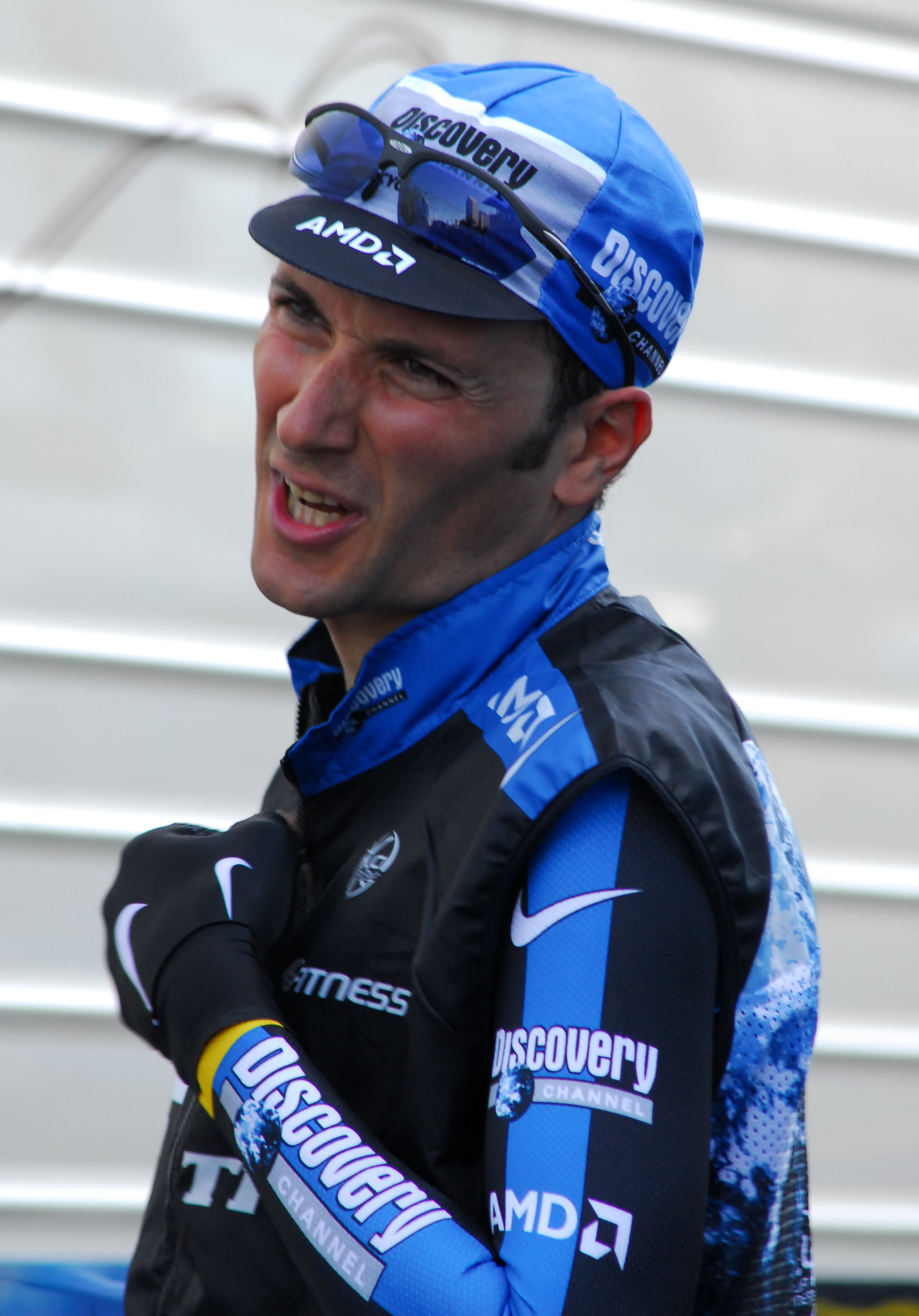
Ivan Basso after Prologue

Stage 1 was held Monday, February 19, 2007. A breakaway of four riders including Adam Hansen of T-Mobile Team was reeled in shortly before the finish in Santa Rosa. During the second of the three finishing laps in Santa Rosa, a crash took down most of the peloton, including leader Levi Leipheimer. Those not involved in the crash fought for the stage victory, taken by Graeme Brown by mere millimeters.

Riders involved in the crash lost several minutes, but the race officials decided to credit most of them with the winner's time, meaning that Leipheimer retained the leader's jersey. This decision, which meant extending the "safety zone" to 6 miles (10 km) before the end, was criticized by some riders and team staff.

Stage 1 Result

	Cyclist	Team	Time
1	Graeme Brown (AUS)	Rabobank	4h 17' 19"
2	Greg Henderson (NZL)	T-Mobile Team	+ 0"
3	Allan Davis (AUS)	Discovery Channel	+ 0"

General Classification after Stage 1

	Cyclist	Team	Time
1	Levi Leipheimer (USA)	Discovery Channel	4h 22' 08"
2	Jason Donald (USA)	Slipstream–Chipotle	+ 1"
3	Benjamin Jacques-Maynes (USA)	Priority Health–Bissell	+ 5"

Mountain Classification after Stage 1

	Cyclist	Team	Time
1	Tom Peterson (USA)	Slipstream–Chipotle	11 pts
2	Jurgen Van De Walle (BEL)	Quick-Step–Innergetic	10 pts
3	Theo Eltink (NED)	Rabobank	4 pts

Points Classification after Stage 1

	Cyclist	Team	Time
1	Allan Davis (AUS)	Discovery Channel	20 pts
2	Graeme Brown (AUS)	Rabobank	15 pts
3	Greg Henderson (NZL)	T-Mobile Team	12 pts

=== Stage 2: Santa Rosa to Sacramento ===
Held Tuesday, February 20, 2007.

Stage 2 Result

	Cyclist	Team	Time
1	Juan José Haedo (ARG)	Team CSC	4h 40' 39"
2	Luca Paolini (ITA)	Liquigas	+ 0"
3	Thor Hushovd (NOR)	Crédit Agricole	+ 0"

General Classification after Stage 2

	Cyclist	Team	Time
1	Levi Leipheimer (USA)	Discovery Channel	9h 02' 47"
2	Jason Donald (USA)	Slipstream–Chipotle	+ 1"
3	Benjamin Jacques-Maynes (USA)	Priority Health–Bissell	+ 5"

Mountain Classification after Stage 2

	Cyclist	Team	Time
1	Tom Peterson (USA)	Slipstream–Chipotle	16 pts
2	Jurgen Van De Walle (BEL)	Quick-Step–Innergetic	16 pts
3	Christophe Laurent (FRA)	Crédit Agricole	13 pts

Points Classification after Stage 2

	Cyclist	Team	Time
1	Allan Davis (AUS)	Discovery Channel	27 pts
2	Graeme Brown (AUS)	Rabobank	20 pts
3	Juan José Haedo (ARG)	Team CSC	18 pts

=== Stage 3: Stockton to San Jose ===
Held Wednesday, February 21, 2007.

Stage 3 Result

	Cyclist	Team	Time
1	Jens Voigt (GER)	Team CSC	3h 43' 44"
2	Levi Leipheimer (USA)	Discovery Channel	+ 0"
3	Chris Horner (USA)	Predictor–Lotto	+ 0"

General Classification after Stage 3

	Cyclist	Team	Time
1	Levi Leipheimer (USA)	Discovery Channel	12h 46' 31"
2	Jens Voigt (GER)	Team CSC	+ 3"
3	Rory Sutherland (AUS)	Health Net–Maxxis	+ 15"

Mountain Classification after Stage 3

	Cyclist	Team	Time
1	Tom Peterson (USA)	Slipstream–Chipotle	16 pts
2	Jurgen Van De Walle (BEL)	Quick-Step–Innergetic	16 pts
3	Christophe Laurent (FRA)	Crédit Agricole	13 pts

Points Classification after Stage 3

	Cyclist	Team	Time
1	Allan Davis (AUS)	Discovery Channel	27 pts
2	Jens Voigt (GER)	Team CSC	20 pts
3	Graeme Brown (AUS)	Rabobank	20 pts

=== Stage 4: Seaside to San Luis Obispo ===
Stage 4 was held Thursday, February 22, 2007. Reigning Olympic and World Champion Paolo Bettini captured Stage 4, the event's longest stage, edging Gerald Ciolek, Juan José Haedo, and Thor Hushovd in a sprint finish after the peloton reeled in a seven-man breakaway consisting of Hilton Clarke (Navigators Insurance), Aaron Olson (T-Mobile Team), Kirk O'Bee (Health Net–Maxxis), Alejandro Acton (Colavita–Sutter Home), Christophe Laurent (Crédit Agricole), Lucas Euser (Slipstream–Chipotle), and Sean Sullivan (Toyota–United).

Stage 4 Result

	Cyclist	Team	Time
1	Paolo Bettini (ITA)	Quick-Step–Innergetic	5h 05' 47"
2	Gerald Ciolek (GER)	T-Mobile Team	+ 0"
3	Juan José Haedo (ARG)	Team CSC	+ 0"

General Classification after Stage 4

	Cyclist	Team	Time
1	Levi Leipheimer (USA)	Discovery Channel	17h 52' 12"
2	Jens Voigt (GER)	Team CSC	+ 3"
3	Rory Sutherland (AUS)	Health Net–Maxxis	+ 15"

Mountain Classification after Stage 4

	Cyclist	Team	Time
1	Christophe Laurent (FRA)	Crédit Agricole	26 pts
2	Jurgen Van De Walle (BEL)	Quick-Step–Innergetic	16 pts
3	Tom Peterson (USA)	Slipstream–Chipotle	16 pts

Points Classification after Stage 4

	Cyclist	Team	Time
1	Juan José Haedo (ARG)	Team CSC	28 pts
2	Graeme Brown (AUS)	Rabobank	26 pts
3	Thor Hushovd (NOR)	Crédit Agricole	24 pts

=== Stage 5: Solvang time trial ===
Held Friday, February 23, 2007, Stage 5 was an individual time trial. Yellow jersey holder Levi Leipheimer extended his lead over second place Jens Voigt and the rest of the field.

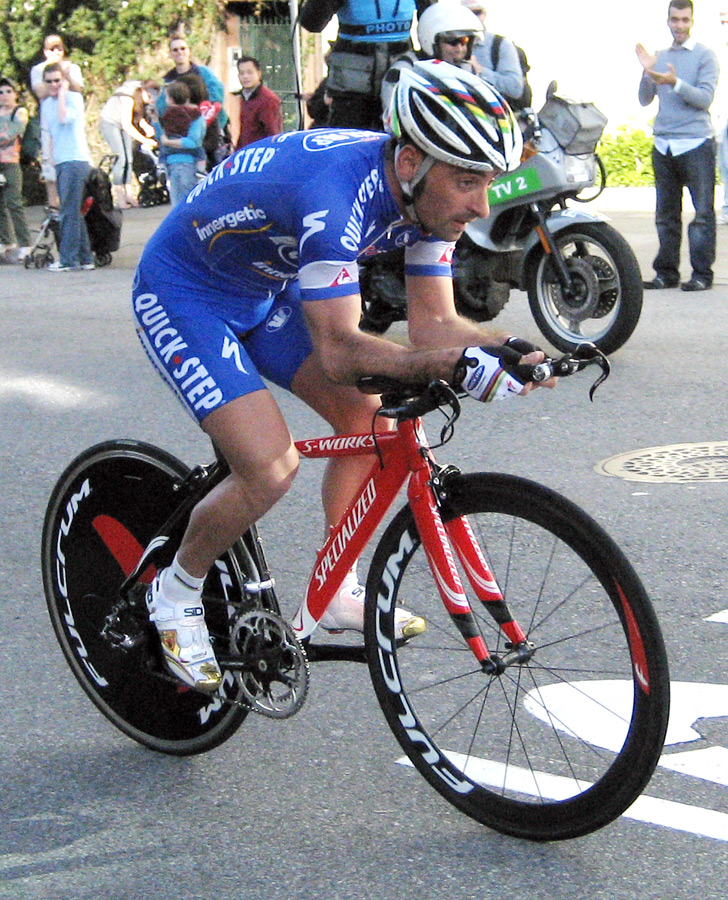
Paolo Bettini on 2007 Tour of California

Stage 5 Result

	Cyclist	Team	Time
1	Levi Leipheimer (USA)	Discovery Channel	29' 41"
2	Jens Voigt (GER)	Team CSC	+ 18"
3	Jason McCartney (USA)	Discovery Channel	+ 25"

General Classification after Stage 5

	Cyclist	Team	Time
1	Levi Leipheimer (USA)	Discovery Channel	17h 52' 12"
2	Jens Voigt (GER)	Team CSC	+ 21"
3	Jason McCartney (USA)	Discovery Channel	+ 54"

Mountain Classification after Stage 5

	Cyclist	Team	Time
1	Christophe Laurent (FRA)	Crédit Agricole	26 pts
2	Jurgen Van De Walle (BEL)	Quick-Step–Innergetic	16 pts
3	Tom Peterson (USA)	Slipstream–Chipotle	16 pts

Points Classification after Stage 5

	Cyclist	Team	Time
1	Juan José Haedo (ARG)	Team CSC	28 pts
2	Graeme Brown (AUS)	Rabobank	26 pts
3	Thor Hushovd (NOR)	Crédit Agricole	24 pts

=== Stage 6: Santa Barbara to Santa Clarita ===
Stage 6 Result

	Cyclist	Team	Time
1	Juan José Haedo (ARG)	Team CSC	3h 56' 04"
2	Greg Henderson (NZL)	T-Mobile Team	+ 0"
3	Paolo Bettini (ITA)	Quick-Step–Innergetic	+ 0"

General Classification after Stage 6

	Cyclist	Team	Time
1	Levi Leipheimer (USA)	Discovery Channel	22h 17' 56"
2	Jens Voigt (GER)	Team CSC	+ 21"
3	Jason McCartney (USA)	Team CSC	+ 54"

Mountain Classification after Stage 6

	Cyclist	Team	Time
1	Christophe Laurent (FRA)	Crédit Agricole	28 pts
2	Jurgen Van De Walle (BEL)	Quick-Step–Innergetic	25 pts
3	Tom Peterson (USA)	Slipstream–Chipotle	16 pts

Points Classification after Stage 6

	Cyclist	Team	Time
1	Juan José Haedo (ARG)	Team CSC	43 pts
2	Paolo Bettini (ITA)	Quick-Step–Innergetic	32 pts
3	Thor Hushovd (NOR)	Crédit Agricole	31 pts

Young Rider Classification

1. Robert Gesink (NED), Rabobank, 22.20.46

Most Aggressive Rider

- Stuart O'Grady (AUS), Team CSC

Team classification

1. Team CSC, 66.56.17
2. Discovery Channel, +2.19
3. T-Mobile Team, +3.20

=== Stage 7: Long Beach circuit race ===
Held Sunday, February 25, 2007.

Stage 7 Result

	Cyclist	Team	Time
1	Ivan Dominguez (CUB)	Toyota–United	2h 39' 28"
2	Graeme Brown (AUS)	Rabobank	+ 0"
3	Gerald Ciolek (GER)	T-Mobile Team	+ 0"

== Final results ==
General Classification after Stage 7 (Final results)

	Cyclist	Team	Time
1	Levi Leipheimer (USA)	Discovery Channel	24h 57' 24"
2	Jens Voigt (GER)	Team CSC	+ 21"
3	Jason McCartney (USA)	Discovery Channel	+ 54"
4	Bobby Julich (USA)	Team CSC	+ 1' 06"
5	Stuart O'Grady (AUS)	Team CSC	+ 1' 16"
6	Christian Vande Velde (USA)	Team CSC	+ 1' 24"
7	Michael Rogers (AUS)	T-Mobile Team	+ 1' 32"
8	Ben Day (AUS)	Navigators Insurance	+ 1' 38"
9	Franco Pellizotti (ITA)	Liquigas	+ 1' 41"
10	Ryder Hesjedal (CAN)	Health Net–Maxxis	+ 1' 57"

Mountain Classification after Stage 7
(Final results)

	Cyclist	Team	Time
1	Christophe Laurent (FRA)	Crédit Agricole	28 pts
2	Jurgen Van De Walle (BEL)	Quick-Step–Innergetic	25 pts
3	Tom Peterson (USA)	Slipstream–Chipotle	16 pts

Points Classification after Stage 7
(Final results)

	Cyclist	Team	Time
1	Juan José Haedo (ARG)	Team CSC	44 pts
2	Graeme Brown (AUS)	Rabobank	41 pts
3	Thor Hushovd (NOR)	Crédit Agricole	36 pts

Young Rider Classification after Stage 7
(Final results)

	Cyclist	Team	Time
1	Robert Gesink (NED)	Rabobank	25h 00' 14"
2	Matthew Lloyd (AUS)	Predictor–Lotto	+ 41"
3	Tom Peterson (USA)	Slipstream–Chipotle	+ 53"

Team Classification after Stage 7
(Final results)

	Team	Time
1	Team CSC	74h 54' 41"
2	Discovery Channel	+ 2' 19"
3	T-Mobile Team	+ 3' 20"

== Jersey progress ==
Stage (Winner)	General Classification	Sprint Classification	Mountains Classification	Youth Classification	Team Classification	Most Aggressive
Prologue (Levi Leipheimer)	Levi Leipheimer	no award	Brian Sheedy	Taylor Tolleson	Discovery Channel	no award
Stage 1 (Graeme Brown)	Levi Leipheimer	Allan Davis	Tom Peterson	Taylor Tolleson	Discovery Channel	Jurgen Van de Walle
Stage 2 (Juan José Haedo)	Levi Leipheimer	Allan Davis	Tom Peterson	Taylor Tolleson	Discovery Channel	Christophe Laurent
Stage 3 (Jens Voigt)	Levi Leipheimer	Allan Davis	Tom Peterson	Matthew Lloyd	Team CSC	Jens Voigt
Stage 4 (Paolo Bettini)	Levi Leipheimer	Juan José Haedo	Christophe Laurent	Matthew Lloyd	Team CSC	Alejandro Acton
Stage 5 (Levi Leipheimer)	Levi Leipheimer	Juan José Haedo	Christophe Laurent	Robert Gesink	Team CSC	no award
Stage 6 (Juan José Haedo)	Levi Leipheimer	Juan José Haedo	Christophe Laurent	Robert Gesink	Team CSC	Stuart O'Grady
Stage 7 (Ivan Dominguez)	Levi Leipheimer	Juan José Haedo	Christophe Laurent	Robert Gesink	Team CSC	Danny Pate
Final	Levi Leipheimer	Juan José Haedo	Christophe Laurent	Robert Gesink	Team CSC	

== Teams ==
UCI ProTour teams

- C.A - Crédit Agricole
- DSC - Discovery Channel
- GST - Gerolsteiner
- LIQ - Liquigas
- PRL - Predictor–Lotto
- QSI - Quick-Step–Innergetic
- RAB - Rabobank
- TMO - T-Mobile Team
- CSC - Team CSC

UCI Professional Continental teams

- HNM - Health Net–Maxxis
- NIC - Navigators Insurance
- TSL - Slipstream–Chipotle

UCI Continental teams

- BMC - BMC Racing Team
- TUT - Toyota–United

USA Cycling registered teams

- COL - Colavita–Sutter Home
- JBC - Jelly Belly Cycling Team
- ABB - Priority Health–Bissell
- USA - USA Cycling National Development Team
