= Ben Jacques-Maynes =

American racing cyclist (born 1978)

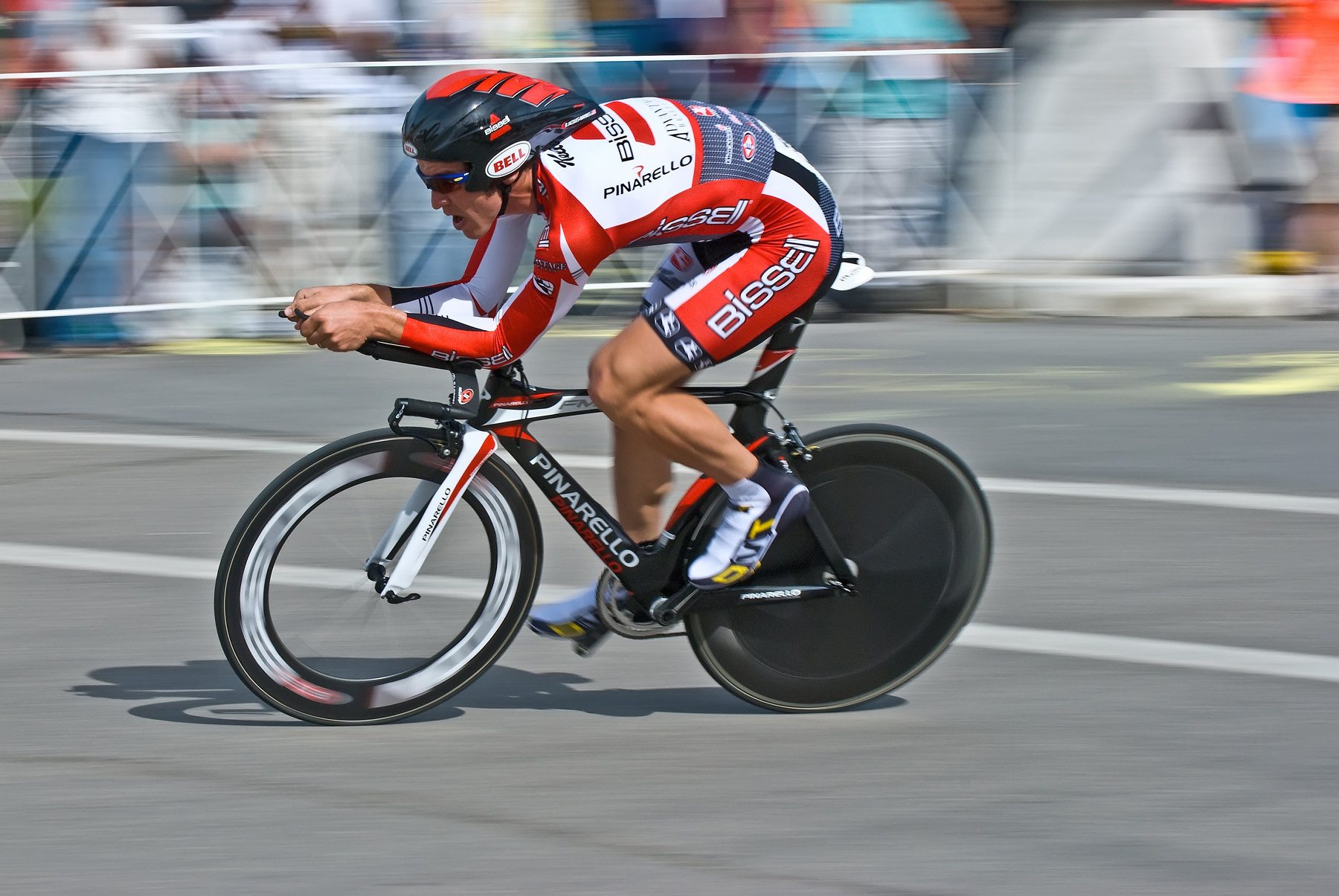
- Jacques-Maynes at the 2009 Tour of California

Personal information
- Full name: Benjamin Jacques-Maynes
- Born: September 22, 1978 (age 48) Berkeley, California, United States

Cycling career
- Sport: Cycling
- Current team: Retired
- Discipline: Road
- Role: Rider

Amateur team
- 2001: Lombardi Sports

Professional teams
- 2002–2006: Sierra Nevada–Cannondale
- 2007–2012: Priority Health–Bissell
- 2013–2015: Jamis–Hagens Berman

Benjamin Jacques-Maynes (born September 22, 1978) is an American former road bicycle racing cyclist, who competed professionally between 2002 and 2015 for the Sierra Nevada–Cannondale, Bissell and Jamis–Hagens Berman teams. His identical twin brother, Andy Jacques-Maynes, also competed professionally and was also part of the Bissell team in 2011.

== Career ==
In the 2009 Nevada City Classic in California, Jacques-Maynes took second, from a three-man break that included race-winner Lance Armstrong and Levi Leipheimer. Before an estimated 20,000 fans, the trio was able to lap the field on the very difficult short course.

In the spring of 2010, in what VeloNews called "the first major pro road race of the U.S. season", Jacques-Maynes won the Merco Credit Union Classic, a three-stage event in California. His Bissell team won the team time trial, and he won the Merced Foothills Road Race.

In Stage 2 of the weather-affected 2011 Tour of California, Jacques-Maynes played a prominent role in a four-man early breakaway that held off the peloton for approximately 50 miles (80 kilometres). Jacques-Maynes was the last of the four to be caught on the stage from Nevada City to Sacramento, just as he was entering downtown Sacramento for the finishing laps.

Jacques-Maynes entered every edition of the Tour of California from its inception, until 2015. In the 2007 Tour of California, he placed third in the prologue time trial.

== Major results ==
2004
1st Nature Valley Grand Prix
2007
1st Cascade Cycling Classic
1st Mt. Hood Cycling Classic
1st Exeter TT, Sequoia Cycling Classic
2008
1st Exeter TT, Sequoia Cycling Classic
1st Prologue Mt Hood Classic
2nd Tour de Leelanau
2009
1st Copperopolis Road Race
2nd Nevada City Classic
7th Overall Tour de San Luis
7th Overall Tour of Missouri
7th Overall Herald Sun Tour
2010
1st Merced Credit Union Cycling Classic
2012
1st Mountains classification Tour of Utah
7th Tour of the Battenkill
2013
7th Bucks County Classic
9th Overall Tour of Elk Grove
2014
1st Mountains classification 2014 USA Pro Cycling Challenge
2015
4th Overall Cascade Cycling Classic
