= 2013 Tour of Utah =

2012–13 UCI America Tour

Race details
- Dates: August 6–11, 2013
- Stages: 6
- Distance: 587 miles (945 km)
- Winning time: 23h 05' 45"

Results
| Jersey awarded to the overall winner | Winner | Tom Danielson (USA) | (Garmin–Sharp) |
| | Second | Chris Horner (USA) | (RadioShack–Leopard) |
| | Third | Janier Acevedo (COL) | (Jamis–Hagens Berman) |
| Jersey awarded to the mountains classification winner | Mountains | Michael Torckler (NZL) | (Bissell) |
| Jersey awarded to the young rider classification winner | Young rider | Lachlan Morton (AUS) | (Garmin–Sharp) |
| Jersey awarded to the sprints classification winner | Sprints | Michael Matthews (AUS) | (Orica–GreenEDGE) |
| | Team | RadioShack–Leopard | |

The 2013 Larry H. Miller Tour of Utah is the tenth edition of the Tour of Utah. Once again, the race was included on the UCI America Tour, with a UCI classification of 2.1. As such, the race is only open to teams on the UCI Pro Tour, UCI Professional Continental and UCI Continental circuits. The race took place between August 6–11, 2013 as a six-day, six-stage race, with some major differences to the prior editions, such as the elimination of the prologue, individual time trial, or team time trial. The 2013 Tour of Utah was one of six UCI-ranked stage races in the United States in 2013.

After finishing high overall in previous editions, American Tom Danielson of EF Education–EasyPost won the overall title.

== Teams ==
In July, the Tour of Utah announced a sixteen-team field, made up of five UCI ProTeams (down from six), three UCI Professional Continental teams (down from five) and eight UCI Continental teams (up from six), thus giving the race a total of sixteen-teams (down from seventeen). In total, ten of the sixteen-teams that competed in 2013 were invited to return to this event, as well as Jamis–Hagens Berman (previously Jamis–Sutter Home) who competed in the 2011 and 2010 editions. UCI ProTeams Cannondale, RadioShack–Leopard, and Orica–GreenEDGE are based in Italy, Luxembourg, and Australia, respectively; UCI Professional Continental Team MTN–Qhubeka is based in South Africa, while UCI Continental Team Funvic Brasilinvest–São José dos Campos is based in Brazil. The remaining eleven teams are based in the United States.

UCI ProTeams

- BMC Racing Team *
- Cannondale *
- Garmin–Sharp *
- Orica–GreenEDGE
- RadioShack–Leopard *

UCI Professional Continental Teams

- Champion System *
- MTN–Qhubeka
- UnitedHealthcare *

(* – participated in 2012)

UCI Continental Teams

- 5-hour Energy *
- Bissell *
- Bontrager Cycling Team *
- Funvic Brasilinvest–São José dos Campos
- Hincapie Sportswear Development Team
- Jamis–Hagens Berman
- Jelly Belly–Kenda
- Optum–Kelly Benefit Strategies *

== Contenders ==
Defending champion Johann Tschopp of Switzerland will not defend his title. Other contenders include, Jamis–Hagens Berman's Janier Acevedo of Colombia, Spain's Francisco Mancebo of 5-hour Energy, and Americans Tom Danielson of Garmin–Sharp and Chris Horner of RadioShack–Leopard.

== Stages ==
Stage results
| Stage | Date | Route | Terrain | Length | Winner |
|---|---|---|---|---|---|
| 1 | 6 August | Brian Head – Cedar City | Hilly stage | 112 mi (180 km) | Greg Van Avermaet (BEL) |
| 2 | 7 August | Panguitch – Torrey | Medium mountain stage | 131 mi (211 km) | Michael Matthews (AUS) |
| 3 | 8 August | Richfield – Payson | Medium mountain stage | 119 mi (192 km) | Lachlan Morton (AUS) |
| 4 | 9 August | Salt Lake City – Salt Lake City | Flat stage | 34 mi (55 km) | Michael Matthews (AUS) |
| 5 | 10 August | Snowbasin – Snowbird | Mountain stage | 113 mi (182 km) | Chris Horner (USA) |
| 6 | 11 August | Park City – Park City | Medium mountain stage | 78 mi (126 km) | Francisco Mancebo (ESP) |
| | Total | | 587 mi (945 km) | | |

=== Stage 1 ===
August 6, 2013 – Brian Head to Cedar City, Hilly stage, 112 miles (180 km)
For the second consecutive time, the Tour of Utah started with a full stage instead of a prologue. Although the route included two categorized climbs, a sizable peloton of a hundred returned to downtown Cedar City.

Stage 1 Results

| | Rider | Team | Time |
|---|---|---|---|
| 1 | Greg Van Avermaet (BEL) | BMC Racing Team | 4h 11' 00" |
| 2 | Michael Matthews (AUS) | Orica–GreenEDGE | s.t. |
| 3 | Ty Magner (USA) | Hincapie Sportswear Development Team | s.t. |
| 4 | Eric Young (USA) | Optum–Kelly Benefit Strategies | s.t. |
| 5 | Kiel Reijnen (USA) | UnitedHealthcare | s.t. |
| 6 | Joseph Lewis (AUS) | Hincapie Sportswear Development Team | s.t. |
| 7 | Jasper Stuyven (BEL) | Bontrager Cycling Team | s.t. |
| 8 | Christopher Baldwin (USA) | Bissell | s.t. |
| 9 | Fred Rodriguez (USA) | Jelly Belly–Kenda | s.t. |
| 10 | Jeff Louder (USA) | UnitedHealthcare | s.t. |

General Classification after Stage 1

| | Rider | Team | Time |
|---|---|---|---|
| 1 | Greg Van Avermaet (BEL) | BMC Racing Team | 4h 10' 50" |
| 2 | Michael Matthews (AUS) | Orica–GreenEDGE | + 4" |
| 3 | Christopher Jones (USA) | UnitedHealthcare | + 4" |
| 4 | Ty Magner (USA) | Hincapie Sportswear Development Team | + 6" |
| 5 | Max Jenkins (USA) | 5-hour Energy | + 9" |
| 6 | Tiago Machado (POR) | RadioShack–Leopard | + 9" |
| 7 | Eric Young (USA) | Optum–Kelly Benefit Strategies | + 10" |
| 8 | Kiel Reijnen (USA) | UnitedHealthcare | + 10" |
| 9 | Joseph Lewis (AUS) | Hincapie Sportswear Development Team | + 10" |
| 10 | Jasper Stuyven (BEL) | Bontrager Cycling Team | + 10" |

=== Stage 2 ===
August 7, 2013 – Panguitch to Torrey, Medium mountain stage, 131 miles (211 km)

Stage 2 Results

| | Rider | Team | Time |
|---|---|---|---|
| 1 | Michael Matthews (AUS) | Orica–GreenEDGE | 5h 17' 55" |
| 2 | Greg Van Avermaet (BEL) | BMC Racing Team | s.t. |
| 3 | Jasper Stuyven (BEL) | Bontrager Cycling Team | s.t. |
| 4 | Michel Koch (GER) | Cannondale | s.t. |
| 5 | Kiel Reijnen (USA) | UnitedHealthcare | s.t. |
| 6 | Ty Magner (USA) | Hincapie Sportswear Development Team | s.t. |
| 7 | Alessandro Bazzana (ITA) | UnitedHealthcare | s.t. |
| 8 | Chad Beyer (USA) | Champion System | s.t. |
| 9 | Serghei Tvetcov (MDA) | Jelly Belly–Kenda | s.t. |
| 10 | Janier Acevedo (COL) | Jamis–Hagens Berman | s.t. |

General Classification after Stage 2

| | Rider | Team | Time |
|---|---|---|---|
| 1 | Michael Matthews (AUS) | Orica–GreenEDGE | 9h 28' 39" |
| 2 | Greg Van Avermaet (BEL) | BMC Racing Team | + 1" |
| 3 | Christopher Jones (USA) | UnitedHealthcare | + 11" |
| 4 | Ty Magner (USA) | Hincapie Sportswear Development Team | + 13" |
| 5 | Jasper Stuyven (BEL) | Bontrager Cycling Team | + 13" |
| 6 | Max Jenkins (USA) | 5-hour Energy | + 16" |
| 7 | Tiago Machado (POR) | RadioShack–Leopard | + 16" |
| 8 | Kiel Reijnen (USA) | UnitedHealthcare | + 17" |
| 9 | Michel Koch (GER) | Cannondale | + 17" |
| 10 | Chad Beyer (USA) | Champion System | + 17" |

=== Stage 3 ===
August 8, 2013 – Richfield to Payson, Medium mountain stage, 119 miles (192 km)

Stage 3 Results

| | Rider | Team | Time |
|---|---|---|---|
| 1 | Lachlan Morton (AUS) | Garmin–Sharp | 4h 20' 20" |
| 2 | Greg Van Avermaet (BEL) | BMC Racing Team | + 33" |
| 3 | Lucas Euser (USA) | UnitedHealthcare | + 34" |
| 4 | George Bennett (NZL) | RadioShack–Leopard | + 34" |
| 5 | Janier Acevedo (COL) | Jamis–Hagens Berman | + 34" |
| 6 | Gregory Brenes (CRC) | Champion System | + 34" |
| 7 | Chris Horner (USA) | RadioShack–Leopard | + 34" |
| 8 | Philip Deignan (IRL) | UnitedHealthcare | + 34" |
| 9 | Tiago Machado (POR) | RadioShack–Leopard | + 34" |
| 10 | Matthew Busche (USA) | RadioShack–Leopard | + 34" |

General Classification after Stage 3

| | Rider | Team | Time |
|---|---|---|---|
| 1 | Lachlan Morton (AUS) | Garmin–Sharp | 13h 49' 07" |
| 2 | Greg Van Avermaet (BEL) | BMC Racing Team | + 22" |
| 3 | Lucas Euser (USA) | UnitedHealthcare | + 40" |
| 4 | Tiago Machado (POR) | RadioShack–Leopard | + 43" |
| 5 | Gregory Brenes (CRC) | Champion System | + 44" |
| 6 | Michael Schär (SWI) | BMC Racing Team | + 44" |
| 7 | Chris Horner (USA) | RadioShack–Leopard | + 44" |
| 8 | Ben King (USA) | RadioShack–Leopard | + 44" |
| 9 | Carter Jones (USA) | Bissell | + 44" |
| 10 | Ben Day (AUS) | UnitedHealthcare | + 44" |

=== Stage 4 ===
August 9, 2013 – Salt Lake City to Salt Lake City, Flat stage, 34 miles (55 km)

Stage 4 Results

| | Rider | Team | Time |
|---|---|---|---|
| 1 | Michael Matthews (AUS) | Orica–GreenEDGE | 1h 10' 17" |
| 2 | Greg Van Avermaet (BEL) | BMC Racing Team | s.t. |
| 3 | Jasper Stuyven (BEL) | Bontrager Cycling Team | s.t. |
| 4 | Alessandro Bazzana (ITA) | UnitedHealthcare | s.t. |
| 5 | Jesse Anthony (USA) | Optum–Kelly Benefit Strategies | s.t. |
| 6 | Kiel Reijnen (USA) | UnitedHealthcare | s.t. |
| 7 | Gregory Brenes (CRC) | Champion System | s.t. |
| 8 | Janier Acevedo (COL) | Jamis–Hagens Berman | s.t. |
| 9 | Ryder Hesjedal (CAN) | Garmin–Sharp | s.t. |
| 10 | Lachlan Morton (AUS) | Garmin–Sharp | s.t. |

General Classification after Stage 4

| | Rider | Team | Time |
|---|---|---|---|
| 1 | Lachlan Morton (AUS) | Garmin–Sharp | 14h 59' 24" |
| 2 | Greg Van Avermaet (BEL) | BMC Racing Team | + 26" |
| 3 | Lucas Euser (USA) | UnitedHealthcare | + 40" |
| 4 | Tiago Machado (POR) | RadioShack–Leopard | + 43" |
| 5 | Gregory Brenes (CRC) | Champion System | + 44" |
| 6 | Chris Horner (USA) | RadioShack–Leopard | + 44" |
| 7 | Ben King (USA) | RadioShack–Leopard | + 44" |
| 8 | Ben Day (AUS) | UnitedHealthcare | + 44" |
| 9 | Matthew Busche (USA) | RadioShack–Leopard | + 44" |
| 10 | Peter Stetina (USA) | Garmin–Sharp | + 44" |

=== Stage 5 ===
August 10, 2013 – Snowbasin – Snowbird, Mountain stage, 113 miles (182 km)

Stage 5 Results

| | Rider | Team | Time |
|---|---|---|---|
| 1 | Chris Horner (USA) | RadioShack–Leopard | 4h 52' 45" |
| 2 | Tom Danielson (USA) | Garmin–Sharp | s.t. |
| 3 | Yannick Eijssen (BEL) | BMC Racing Team | + 31" |
| 4 | George Bennett (NZL) | RadioShack–Leopard | + 37" |
| 5 | Lucas Euser (USA) | UnitedHealthcare | + 37" |
| 6 | Matthew Busche (USA) | RadioShack–Leopard | + 37" |
| 7 | Philip Deignan (IRL) | UnitedHealthcare | + 58" |
| 8 | Janier Acevedo (COL) | Jamis–Hagens Berman | + 1' 08" |
| 9 | Francisco Mancebo (ESP) | 5-hour Energy | + 1' 14" |
| 10 | Michael Schär (SWI) | BMC Racing Team | + 1' 31" |

General Classification after Stage 5

| | Rider | Team | Time |
|---|---|---|---|
| 1 | Chris Horner (USA) | RadioShack–Leopard | 19h 52' 52" |
| 2 | Tom Danielson (USA) | Garmin–Sharp | + 0" |
| 3 | Lucas Euser (USA) | UnitedHealthcare | + 32" |
| 4 | George Bennett (NZL) | RadioShack–Leopard | + 36" |
| 5 | Matthew Busche (USA) | RadioShack–Leopard | + 37" |
| 6 | Philip Deignan (IRL) | UnitedHealthcare | + 57" |
| 7 | Tiago Machado (POR) | RadioShack–Leopard | + 1' 40" |
| 8 | Michael Schär (SWI) | BMC Racing Team | + 1' 41" |
| 9 | Janier Acevedo (COL) | Jamis–Hagens Berman | + 1' 42" |
| 10 | Chris Butler (USA) | Champion System | + 1' 59" |

=== Stage 6 ===
August 11, 2013 – Park City – Park City, Mountain stage, 78 miles (126 km)

Stage 6 Results

| | Rider | Team | Time |
|---|---|---|---|
| 1 | Francisco Mancebo (ESP) | 5-hour Energy | 3h 12' 52" |
| 2 | Janier Acevedo (COL) | Jamis–Hagens Berman | s.t. |
| 3 | Tom Danielson (USA) | Garmin–Sharp | + 4" |
| 4 | Lucas Euser (USA) | UnitedHealthcare | + 1' 29" |
| 5 | Matthew Busche (USA) | RadioShack–Leopard | + 1' 29" |
| 6 | Michael Schär (SWI) | BMC Racing Team | + 1' 29" |
| 7 | Philip Deignan (IRL) | UnitedHealthcare | + 1' 29" |
| 8 | Chris Horner (USA) | RadioShack–Leopard | + 1' 29" |
| 9 | Carter Jones (USA) | Bissell | + 1' 29" |
| 10 | Jasper Stuyven (BEL) | Bontrager Cycling Team | + 1' 39" |

General Classification after Stage 6

| | Rider | Team | Time |
|---|---|---|---|
| 1 | Tom Danielson (USA) | Garmin–Sharp | 23h 05' 45" |
| 2 | Chris Horner (USA) | RadioShack–Leopard | + 1' 25" |
| 3 | Janier Acevedo (COL) | Jamis–Hagens Berman | + 1' 37" |
| 4 | Lucas Euser (USA) | UnitedHealthcare | + 2' 02" |
| 5 | Matthew Busche (USA) | RadioShack–Leopard | + 2' 06" |
| 6 | Philip Deignan (IRL) | UnitedHealthcare | + 2' 27" |
| 7 | Michael Schär (SWI) | BMC Racing Team | + 3' 11" |
| 8 | Carter Jones (USA) | Bissell | + 3' 49" |
| 9 | Francisco Mancebo (ESP) | 5-hour Energy | + 3' 50" |
| 10 | Tiago Machado (POR) | RadioShack–Leopard | + 3' 50" |

== Classification leadership ==
In the 2013 Tour of Utah, five jerseys are awarded. For the general classification, calculated by adding the finishing times of the stages per cyclist, the leader receives a yellow jersey (Larry H. Miller Dealerships Leader Jersey). This classification is considered the most important of the Tour of Utah, and the winner of the general classification will be considered the winner of the event.

Additionally, there is also a sprints classification, akin to what is called the points classification in other races, which awards a purple jersey (Xo Communications Sprint Jersey). In the sprints classification, cyclists receive points for finishing in the top twenty in a stage. In addition, some points can be won in intermediate sprints.

There is also a mountains classification, which awards a white jersey (Ski Utah King of the Mountain Jersey). In the mountains classifications, points are won by reaching the top of a mountain before other cyclists. Each climb is categorized, either first, second, third, or fourth category, with more points available for the harder climbs.

There is also a youth classification. This classification is calculated the same way as the general classification, but only young cyclists (under 23) are included. The leader of the young rider classification receives a blue jersey (Subaru Best Young Rider Jersey).

The last jersey is awarded to the most aggressive rider of a stage for him to wear on the next stage. It is generally awarded to a rider who attacks constantly or spends a lot of time in the breakaways. This jersey is orange (Vivint Most Aggressive Rider Jersey).

There is also a classification for teams. In this classification, the times of the best three cyclists per stage are added, and the team with the lowest time is the leader.

| Stage | Winner | General Classification | Youth Classification | Mountains Classification | Sprint Classification | Most Courageous | Team Classification |
|---|---|---|---|---|---|---|---|
| 1 | Greg Van Avermaet | Greg Van Avermaet | Ty Magner | Michael Torckler | Greg Van Avermaet | Christopher Jones | Optum–Kelly Benefit Strategies |
| 2 | Michael Matthews | Michael Matthews | Ty Magner | Michael Torckler | Michael Matthews | Martin Wesemann | Hincapie Sportswear Development Team |
| 3 | Lachlan Morton | Lachlan Morton | Lachlan Morton | Michael Torckler | Greg Van Avermaet | James Stemper | Garmin–Sharp |
| 4 | Michael Matthews | Lachlan Morton | Lachlan Morton | Michael Torckler | Greg Van Avermaet | Craig Lewis | Garmin–Sharp |
| 5 | Chris Horner | Chris Horner | Lachlan Morton | Michael Torckler | Greg Van Avermaet | Yannick Eijssen | RadioShack–Leopard |
| 6 | Francisco Mancebo | Tom Danielson | Lachlan Morton | Michael Torckler | Michael Matthews | Francisco Mancebo | RadioShack–Leopard |
| Final | | Tom Danielson | Lachlan Morton | Michael Torckler | Michael Matthews | not awarded | RadioShack–Leopard |

== Classification standings ==
Legend
| Yellow jersey | Denotes the leader of the General classification | White jersey | Denotes the leader of the Mountains classification |
| Violet jersey | Denotes the leader of the Points classification | Blue jersey | Denotes the leader of the Young rider classification |

=== General classification ===
| | Rider | Team | Time |
|---|---|---|---|
| 1 | Tom Danielson (USA) | Garmin–Sharp | 23h 05' 45" |
| 2 | Chris Horner (USA) | RadioShack–Leopard | + 1' 25" |
| 3 | Janier Acevedo (COL) | Jamis–Hagens Berman | + 1' 37" |
| 4 | Lucas Euser (USA) | UnitedHealthcare | + 2' 02" |
| 5 | Matthew Busche (USA) | RadioShack–Leopard | + 2' 06" |
| 6 | Philip Deignan (IRL) | UnitedHealthcare | + 2' 27" |
| 7 | Michael Schär (SWI) | BMC Racing Team | + 3' 11" |
| 8 | Carter Jones (USA) | Bissell | + 3' 49" |
| 9 | Francisco Mancebo (ESP) | 5-hour Energy | + 3' 50" |
| 10 | Tiago Machado (POR) | RadioShack–Leopard | + 3' 50" |

=== Points classification ===
| | Rider | Team | Points |
|---|---|---|---|
| 1 | Michael Matthews (AUS) | Orica–GreenEDGE | 53 |
| 2 | Greg Van Avermaet (BEL) | BMC Racing Team | 46 |
| 3 | Kiel Reijnen (USA) | UnitedHealthcare | 30 |
| 4 | Jasper Stuyven (BEL) | Bontrager Cycling Team | 25 |
| 5 | Janier Acevedo (COL) | Jamis–Hagens Berman | 22 |
| 6 | Francisco Mancebo (ESP) | 5-hour Energy | 21 |
| 7 | Lucas Euser (USA) | UnitedHealthcare | 17 |
| 8 | Lachlan Morton (AUS) | Garmin–Sharp | 16 |
| 8 | Alessandro Bazzana (ITA) | UnitedHealthcare | 11 |
| 10 | Chris Jones (USA) | UnitedHealthcare | 10 |

=== King of the Mountains classification ===
| | Rider | Team | Points |
|---|---|---|---|
| 1 | Michael Torckler (NZL) | Bissell | 40 |
| 2 | Tom Danielson (USA) | Garmin–Sharp | 33 |
| 3 | Francisco Mancebo (ESP) | 5-hour Energy | 20 |
| 4 | Chris Horner (USA) | RadioShack–Leopard | 19 |
| 5 | Tyler Wren (USA) | Jamis–Hagens Berman | 19 |
| 6 | Yannick Eijssen (BEL) | BMC Racing Team | 17 |
| 7 | Lachlan Morton (AUS) | Garmin–Sharp | 16 |
| 8 | Matthew Busche (USA) | RadioShack–Leopard | 15 |
| 9 | Carter Jones (USA) | Bissell | 14 |
| 10 | George Bennett (NZL) | RadioShack–Leopard | 12 |

=== Young riders classification ===
| | Rider | Team | Time |
|---|---|---|---|
| 1 | Lachlan Morton (AUS) | Garmin–Sharp | 23h 12' 25" |
| 2 | Gavin Mannion (USA) | Bontrager Cycling Team | + 3' 13" |
| 3 | Tsgabu Grmay (ETH) | MTN–Qhubeka | + 15' 32" |
| 4 | Luis Enrique Lemus (MEX) | Jelly Belly–Kenda | + 18' 33" |
| 5 | Andzs Flaksis (LAT) | Bontrager Cycling Team | + 25' 28" |
| 6 | Nathan Wilson (USA) | Bontrager Cycling Team | + 27' 31" |
| 7 | Michel Koch (GER) | Cannondale | + 29' 18" |
| 8 | Tanner Putt (USA) | Bontrager Cycling Team | + 29' 37" |
| 9 | Jasper Stuyven (BEL) | Bontrager Cycling Team | + 31' 26" |
| 10 | Connor O'Leary (USA) | Bontrager Cycling Team | + 36' 20" |

=== Team classification ===
| | Team | Time |
|---|---|---|
| 1 | RadioShack–Leopard | 69h 23′ 36″ |
| 2 | UnitedHealthcare | + 4' 50″ |
| 3 | BMC Racing Team | + 12' 27″ |
| 4 | Garmin–Sharp | + 16' 34″ |
| 5 | Jamis–Hagens Berman | + 25' 47″ |
| 6 | Champion System | + 34' 31″ |
| 7 | Bissell | + 43' 28″ |
| 8 | Bontrager Cycling Team | + 1h 02' 45" |
| 9 | 5-hour Energy | + 1h 10' 22″ |
| 10 | Jelly Belly–Kenda | + 1h 11' 42″ |
