= 2027 UCI America Tour =

Bicycle racing competition

- Twenty-third edition of the UCI America Tour

Details
- Dates: 23 October 2026 – 10 October 2027
- Location: North America and South America
- Races: 16

The 2027 UCI America Tour will be the 23nd season of the UCI America Tour. The season begins on 23 October 2026 with the Vuelta a Guatemala and will end in 10 October 2027 with Volta Ciclística de Santa Catarina.

New races for the 2027 season includes the return of 2 United States one-day races; Tour of the Battenkill and Amazon Armed Forces Cycling Classic. Also added were two new Mexican races; one-day Clásica de la República and stage race MEX Tour. Races of 2026 not in 2027 calendar includes the Panamian races such as Gran Prix Panamá. As the season progresses, races may be added to the calendar, changed dates or removed from the calendar.

Throughout the season, points were awarded to the top finishers of stages within stage races and the final general classification standings of each of the stages races and one-day events. The quality and complexity of a race also determined how many points were awarded to the top finishers, the higher the UCI rating of a race, the more points were awarded.

The UCI ratings from highest to lowest were as follows:

- Multi-day events: 2.1 and 2.2
- One-day events: 1.1 and 1.2

== Events ==
Races in the 2027 UCI America Tour
Race	Rating	Date	Winner	Team	Ref
Vuelta a Guatemala	2.2	23 October – 1 November 2026	Jhonatan Chaves (COL)	Nu Colombia	
(Chile) Vuelta al Bio Bio	2.2	1–6 December 2026			
Vuelta Ciclista a Costa Rica	2.2	11–20 December 2026			
Clasico Internacional Venezuela Renace	2.2	6 January 2027			
(Venezuela) Vuelta al Táchira en Bicicleta	2.2	8–17 January 2027			
(Mexico) Clásica de la República	1.1	17 January 2027			
(Mexico) MEX Tour	2.1	19-23 January 2027			
Tour Colombia	2.1	26–31 January 2027			
Jamaica International Cycling Classic	2.2	9–11 April 2027			
(United States) Tour of the Gila	2.2	28 April – 2 May 2027			
(Brazil) Volta Ciclística Internacional do Estado de Sao Paulo	2.2	3–7 May 2027			
(Brazil) Desafio das Américas de Ciclismo	1.2	9 May 2027			
(United States) Tour of the Battenkill	1.2	22 May 2027			
(United States) Amazon Armed Forces Cycling Classic	1.2	5 June 2027			
(Canada) Tour de Beauce	2.2	9–13 June 2027			
Vuelta a Colombia	2.2	6–15 August 2027			
(United States) Philadelphia Cycling Classic p/b AmeriGas	1.1	22 August 2027			
(Brazil) Volta Ciclística de Santa Catarina	2.2	6–10 October 2027			
