= 2012 Tour of Utah =

2011–12 UCI America Tour

Race details
- Dates: August 7–12, 2012
- Stages: 6
- Winning time: 21h 26' 32"

Results
Jersey awarded to the overall winner	Winner	Johann Tschopp (SUI)	(BMC Racing Team)
	Second	Matthew Busche (USA)	(RadioShack–Nissan)
	Third	Leopold König (CZE)	(Team NetApp)
Jersey awarded to the mountains classification winner	Mountains	Ben Jacques-Maynes (USA)	(Bissell)
Jersey awarded to the youth classification winner	Youth	Joseph Dombrowski (USA)	(Bontrager–Livestrong)
Jersey awarded to the sprints classification winner	Sprints	Michael Matthews (AUS)	(Rabobank)
	Team	RadioShack–Nissan	

The 2012 Tour of Utah was the ninth edition of the Tour of Utah. Once again, the race was included on the UCI America Tour, with a UCI classification of 2.1. As such, the race is only open to teams on the UCI Pro Tour, UCI Professional Continental and UCI Continental circuits. The race took place between August 7–12, 2012 as a six-day, six-stage race, with some major differences to the prior editions, such as the elimination of the prologue and the inclusion of a team time trial instead of an individual time trial. The 2012 Tour of Utah was one of five UCI-ranked stage races in the United States in 2012 and one of three (along with the 2012 Tour of California and the 2012 USA Pro Cycling Challenge, which are both ranked 2.HC) that attracted multiple ProTeams to compete.

== Teams ==
In July, the Tour of Utah announced a 17-team field, made up of six ProTeams (up from five), five UCI Professional Continental teams (up from four) and six UCI Continental teams (down from seven), thus giving the race a total of 17 teams (up from 16). In total, eight of the 16 teams that competed in 2011 were invited to return to this event, as well as a ProTeam that merged into another ProTeam (RadioShack-Nissan-Trek) and a team that competed in 2010, but did not get a place in 2011 (Bontrager-Livestrong). EPM–UNE is based in Colombia, and four of the five Professional Continental teams are not US-based, coming from Canada, China, the Netherlands and Germany.

UCI ProTeams

- BMC Racing Team *
- Garmin–Sharp *
- Liquigas–Cannondale *
- RadioShack–Nissan
- Omega Pharma–Quick-Step
- Rabobank

UCI Professional Continental Teams

- UnitedHealthcare *
- SpiderTech–C10 *
- Argos–Shimano
- Champion System
- Team NetApp

(* – participated in 2011)

UCI Continental Teams

- Bissell *
- Optum–Kelly Benefit Strategies *
- Competitive Cyclist Racing Team *
- Bontrager–Livestrong
- EPM–UNE
- Team Exergy

== Contenders ==
In addition to all of the last four champions of the race -- (Jeff Louder (UnitedHealthcare), Francisco Mancebo (Competitive Cyclist) and two-time defending champion Levi Leipheimer (Omega Pharma–Quick-Step)) -- the race included potential contenders Tom Danielson (Garmin), Christian Vande Velde (Garmin), David Zabriskie (Garmin) and Chris Horner (RadioShack-Nissan-Trek). The race was held during the 2012 Summer Olympics, and 11 current or former Olympians competed. Although each of the 17 teams was permitted to bring up to 8 starters (for a maximum of 136), the race included only 129 starters, because 3 of the ProTour teams (BMC, Omega Pharma–Quick-Step, and Liquigas-Cannondale) brought only 6 and a fourth (Rabobank) brought only 7.

== Stages ==
Stage results
Stage	Date	Route	Terrain	Length	Winner
1	7 August	Ogden – Ogden	Medium mountain stage	131 mi (211 km)	Rory Sutherland (AUS)
2	8 August	Miller Motorsports Park	Team time trial	13.5 mi (21.7 km)	Garmin–Sharp
3	9 August	Ogden – University of Utah	Medium mountain stage	88.5 mi (142.4 km)	Michael Matthews (AUS)
4	10 August	Lehi – Salt Lake City	Hilly stage	134.3 mi (216.1 km)	Jake Keough (USA)
5	11 August	Kimball Junction – Snowbird	Mountain stage	101.1 mi (162.7 km)	Johann Tschopp (SUI)
6	12 August	Park City – Park City	Hilly stage	76.73 mi (123.48 km)	Levi Leipheimer (USA)

=== Stage 1 ===
August 7, 2012 -- Ogden – Ogden, Medium mountain stage, 131 miles (211 km)
For the first time, the Tour of Utah started with a full stage instead of a prologue. Although the route included five categorized climbs, a select peloton of 40 returned to downtown Ogden with the lead, resulting in a sprint finish. After a few attempted breakaways in the final kilometers were thwarted, Rory Sutherland of UnitedHealthcare outsprinted the field, finishing several bike lengths ahead of Damiano Caruso of Liquigas–Cannondale, Brent Bookwalter of BMC Racing Team and Lawson Craddock of Bontrager–Livestrong. Although the lead pack all finished in the same time, the first three across the finish line and intermediate sprint placers received time bonuses that gave them the lead.

Stage 1 result

	Rider	Team	Time
1	Rory Sutherland (AUS)	UnitedHealthcare	5h 25' 41"
2	Damiano Caruso (ITA)	Liquigas–Cannondale	s. t.
3	Brent Bookwalter (USA)	BMC Racing Team	s. t.
4	Lawson Craddock (USA)	Bontrager–Livestrong	s. t.
5	Leopold König (CZE)	Team NetApp	s. t.
6	Michael Schär (SUI)	BMC Racing Team	s. t.
7	Christian Vande Velde (USA)	Garmin–Sharp	s. t.
8	Mathias Frank (SUI)	BMC Racing Team	s. t.
9	Christopher Baldwin (USA)	Bissell	s. t.
10	Ivan Santaromita (ITA)	BMC Racing Team	s. t.

General Classification after Stage 1

	Rider	Team	Time
1	Rory Sutherland (AUS)	UnitedHealthcare	5h 25' 31"
2	Damiano Caruso (ITA)	Liquigas–Cannondale	+ 4"
3	Brent Bookwalter (USA)	BMC Racing Team	+ 6"
4	Caleb Fairly (USA)	SpiderTech–C10	+ 8"
5	Lawson Craddock (USA)	Bontrager–Livestrong	+10"
6	Leopold König (CZE)	Team NetApp	+ 10"
7	Michael Schär (SUI)	BMC Racing Team	+ 10"
8	Christian Vande Velde (USA)	Garmin–Sharp	+ 10"
9	Mathias Frank (SUI)	BMC Racing Team	+ 10"
10	Christopher Baldwin (USA)	Bissell	+ 10"

=== Stage 2 ===
August 8, 2012 -- Miller Motorsports Park, team time trial, 13.5 miles (21.7 km)
Team time in the team time trial was determined by the fifth member of the team to cross the finish line. The stage was easily won by the Garmin–Sharp team, pushing American Christian Vande Velde into the overall lead. Levi Leipheimer's chances to defend his championships probably came to an end on this stage, as his weak Omega Pharma–Quick-Step team, which only started with six riders, quickly dropped one rider and then repeatedly had to sit up to avoid dropping a second rider, placing last among the 17 teams and losing over two minutes as a result.

Stage 2 result

	Team	Time
1	Garmin–Sharp	22' 35"
2	Rabobank	+ 33"
3	RadioShack–Nissan	+ 38"
4	Bissell	+ 50"
5	UnitedHealthcare	+ 53"
6	BMC Racing Team	+ 58"
7	Optum–Kelly Benefit Strategies	+ 1' 03"
8	Competitive Cyclist Racing Team	+ 1' 06"
9	Bontrager–Livestrong	+ 1' 08"
10	Team NetApp	+ 1' 10"

General Classification after Stage 2

	Rider	Team	Time
1	Christian Vande Velde (USA)	Garmin–Sharp	5h 48' 16"
2	Tom Danielson (USA)	Garmin–Sharp	s. t.
3	David Zabriskie (USA)	Garmin–Sharp	s. t.
4	Peter Stetina (USA)	Garmin–Sharp	+ 30"
5	Wilco Kelderman (NED)	Rabobank	+ 33"
6	Steven Kruijswijk (NED)	Rabobank	+ 33"
7	Chris Horner (USA)	RadioShack–Nissan	+ 38"
8	Matthew Busche (USA)	RadioShack–Nissan	+ 38"
9	George Bennett (NZL)	RadioShack–Nissan	+ 38"
10	Rory Sutherland (AUS)	UnitedHealthcare	+ 43"

=== Stage 3 ===
August 9, 2012 -- Ogden to University of Utah, 88.5 miles (142.4 km)

Stage 3 result

	Rider	Team	Time
1	Michael Matthews (AUS)	Rabobank	3h 24' 07"
2	Michael Schär (SUI)	BMC Racing Team	s. t.
3	Brent Bookwalter (USA)	BMC Racing Team	s. t.
4	Rory Sutherland (AUS)	UnitedHealthcare	s. t.
5	Caleb Fairly (USA)	SpiderTech–C10	s. t.
6	Gavin Mannion (USA)	Bontrager–Livestrong	s. t.
7	Damiano Caruso (ITA)	Liquigas–Cannondale	s. t.
8	Fred Rodriguez (USA)	Team Exergy	s. t.
9	Joshua Atkins (NZL)	Bontrager–Livestrong	s. t.
10	Francisco Mancebo (ESP)	Competitive Cyclist Racing Team	s. t.

General Classification after Stage 3

	Rider	Team	Time
1	Christian Vande Velde (USA)	Garmin–Sharp	9h 12' 23"
2	Tom Danielson (USA)	Garmin–Sharp	s. t.
3	David Zabriskie (USA)	Garmin–Sharp	s. t.
4	Peter Stetina (USA)	Garmin–Sharp	+ 30"
5	Wilco Kelderman (NED)	Rabobank	+ 33"
6	Steven Kruijswijk (NED)	Rabobank	+ 33"
7	Chris Horner (USA)	RadioShack–Nissan	+ 38"
8	Matthew Busche (USA)	RadioShack–Nissan	+ 38"
9	George Bennett (NZL)	RadioShack–Nissan	+ 38"
10	Rory Sutherland (AUS)	UnitedHealthcare	+ 43"

=== Stage 4 ===
August 10, 2012 -- Lehi – Salt Lake City, 134.3 miles (216.1 km)

Stage 4 result

	Rider	Team	Time
1	Jake Keough (USA)	UnitedHealthcare	4h 47' 06"
2	Marco Benfatto (ITA)	Liquigas–Cannondale	s. t.
3	Tyler Farrar (USA)	Garmin–Sharp	s. t.
4	Michael Matthews (AUS)	Rabobank	s. t.
5	Alexandro Candelario (USA)	Optum–Kelly Benefit Strategies	s. t.
6	Fred Rodriguez (USA)	Team Exergy	s. t.
7	Francisco Mancebo (ESP)	Competitive Cyclist Racing Team	s. t.
8	Brent Bookwalter (USA)	BMC Racing Team	s. t.
9	Martin Velits (SVK)	Omega Pharma–Quick-Step	s. t.
10	Robigzon Leandro Oyola (COL)	EPM–UNE	s. t.

General Classification after Stage 4

	Rider	Team	Time
1	Christian Vande Velde (USA)	Garmin–Sharp	13h 59' 29"
2	Tom Danielson (USA)	Garmin–Sharp	+ 3"
3	David Zabriskie (USA)	Garmin–Sharp	+ 3"
4	Peter Stetina (USA)	Garmin–Sharp	+ 33"
5	Wilco Kelderman (NED)	Rabobank	+ 36"
6	Steven Kruijswijk (NED)	Rabobank	+ 36"
7	George Bennett (NZL)	RadioShack–Nissan	+ 41"
8	Chris Horner (USA)	RadioShack–Nissan	+ 41"
9	Matthew Busche (USA)	RadioShack–Nissan	+ 41"
10	Brent Bookwalter (USA)	BMC Racing Team	+ 50"

=== Stage 5 ===
August 11, 2012 -- Kimball Junction to Snowbird, 101.1 miles (162.7 km)

Stage 5 result

	Rider	Team	Time
1	Johann Tschopp (SUI)	BMC Racing Team	4h 18' 20"
2	Leopold König (CZE)	Team NetApp	+ 43"
3	Joseph Dombrowski (USA)	Bontrager–Livestrong	+ 47"
4	Ian Boswell (USA)	Bontrager–Livestrong	+ 52"
5	Levi Leipheimer (USA)	Omega Pharma–Quick-Step	+ 1' 00"
6	Lucas Euser (USA)	SpiderTech–C10	+ 1' 02"
7	Matthew Busche (USA)	RadioShack–Nissan	+ 1' 02"
8	Mathias Frank (SUI)	BMC Racing Team	+ 1' 23"
9	Christian Vande Velde (USA)	Garmin–Sharp	+ 1' 38"
10	Chris Horner (USA)	RadioShack–Nissan	+ 1' 38"

General Classification after Stage 5

	Rider	Team	Time
1	Johann Tschopp (SUI)	BMC Racing Team	18h 18' 49"
2	Christian Vande Velde (USA)	Garmin–Sharp	+ 38"
3	Matthew Busche (USA)	RadioShack–Nissan	+ 43"
4	Leopold König (CZE)	Team NetApp	+ 53"
5	Joseph Dombrowski (USA)	Bontrager–Livestrong	+ 58"
6	Ian Boswell (USA)	Bontrager–Livestrong	+ 1' 03"
7	Chris Horner (USA)	RadioShack–Nissan	+ 1' 19"
8	Lucas Euser (USA)	SpiderTech–C10	+ 1' 21"
9	Peter Stetina (USA)	Garmin–Sharp	+ 1' 22"
10	Mathias Frank (SUI)	BMC Racing Team	+ 1' 24"

=== Stage 6 ===
August 12, 2012 -- Park City – Park City, 76.73 miles (123.48 km)

Stage 6 result

	Rider	Team	Time
1	Levi Leipheimer (USA)	Omega Pharma–Quick-Step	3h 06' 54"
2	Steven Kruijswijk (NED)	Rabobank	+ 49"
3	Leopold König (CZE)	Team NetApp	+ 49"
4	Johann Tschopp (SUI)	BMC Racing Team	+ 49"
5	Tom Danielson (USA)	Garmin–Sharp	+ 49"
6	Joseph Dombrowski (USA)	Bontrager–Livestrong	+ 49"
7	Matthew Busche (USA)	RadioShack–Nissan	+ 49"
8	Ian Boswell (USA)	Bontrager–Livestrong	+ 49"
9	Lucas Euser (USA)	SpiderTech–C10	+ 49"
10	Chris Horner (USA)	RadioShack–Nissan	+ 49"

Final General Classification

	Rider	Team	Time
1	Johann Tschopp (SUI)	BMC Racing Team	21h 26' 32"
2	Matthew Busche (USA)	RadioShack–Nissan	+ 43"
3	Leopold König (CZE)	Team NetApp	+ 49"
4	Joseph Dombrowski (USA)	Bontrager–Livestrong	+ 58"
5	Ian Boswell (USA)	Bontrager–Livestrong	+ 1' 03"
6	Levi Leipheimer (USA)	Omega Pharma–Quick-Step	+ 1' 08"
7	Chris Horner (USA)	RadioShack–Nissan	+ 1' 19"
8	Lucas Euser (USA)	SpiderTech–C10	+ 1' 21"
9	Steven Kruijswijk (NED)	Rabobank	+ 1' 29"
10	Mathias Frank (SUI)	BMC Racing Team	+ 1' 31"

== Overall ==
=== Classification leadership ===
Stage	Winner	General classification	Sprints classification	Mountains classification	Young rider classification	Most Aggressive	Team classification
1	Rory Sutherland	Rory Sutherland	Rory Sutherland	Ben Jacques-Maynes	Lawson Craddock	Jesse Anthony	BMC Racing Team
2	Garmin–Sharp	Christian Vande Velde	Rory Sutherland	Ben Jacques-Maynes	Wilco Kelderman	no award	Garmin–Sharp
3	Michael Matthews	Christian Vande Velde	Michael Matthews	Timmy Duggan	Wilco Kelderman	Michael Matthews	Garmin–Sharp
4	Jake Keough	Christian Vande Velde	Michael Matthews	Timmy Duggan	Wilco Kelderman	Jasper Stuyven	Garmin–Sharp
5	Johann Tschopp	Johann Tschopp	Michael Matthews	Ben Jacques-Maynes	Joseph Dombrowski	Francisco Mancebo	Garmin–Sharp
6	Levi Leipheimer	Johann Tschopp	Michael Matthews	Ben Jacques-Maynes	Joseph Dombrowski	Rory Sutherland	RadioShack–Nissan
Final		Johann Tschopp	Michael Matthews	Ben Jacques-Maynes	Joseph Dombrowski	no award	RadioShack–Nissan
