= Jeremy Vennell =

New Zealand cyclist

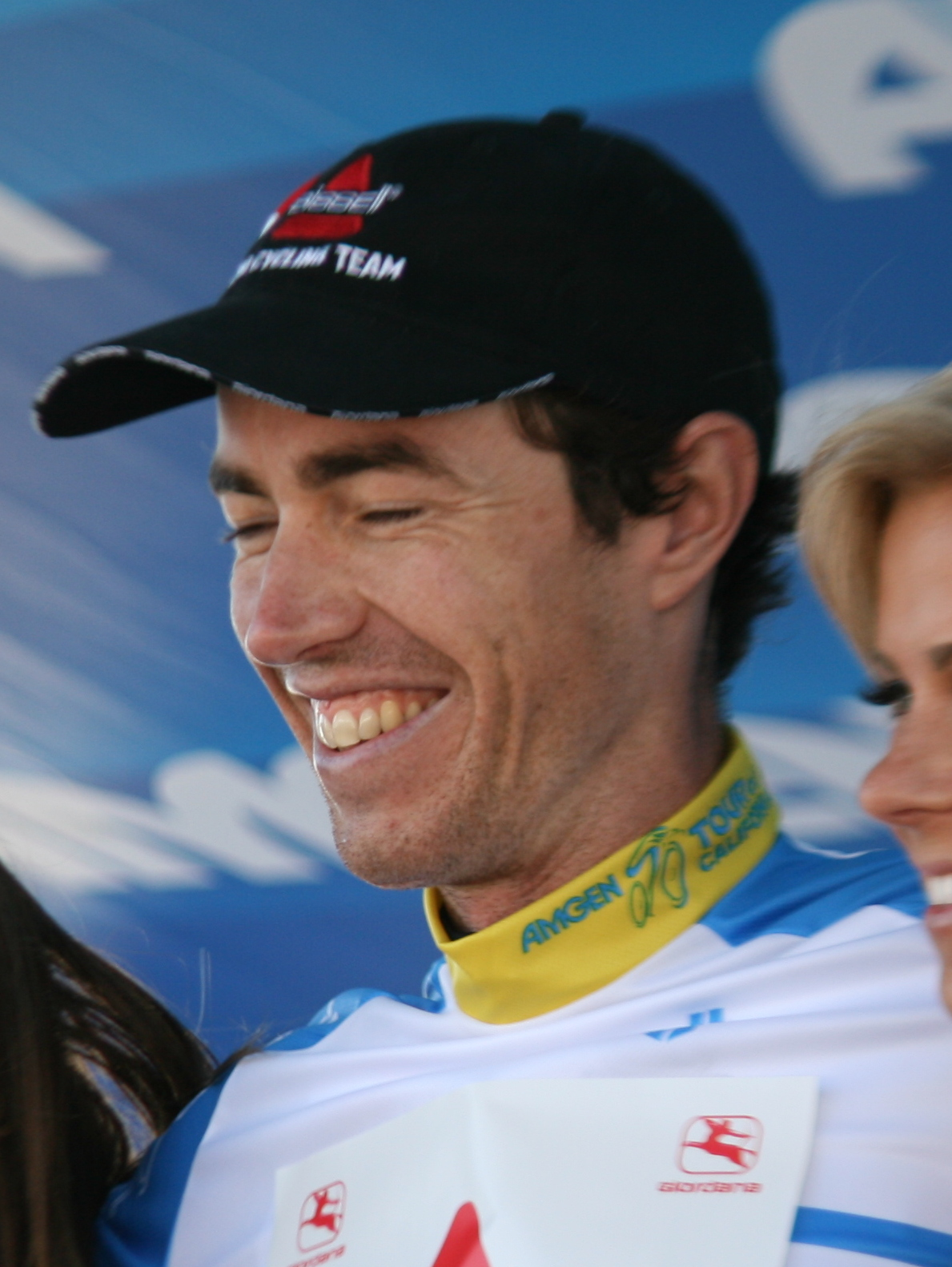
- Jeremy Vennell, Tour of California 2012

Personal information
- Full name: Jeremy Raymond Vennell
- Born: 6 October 1980 (age 46) Hastings, New Zealand

Cycling career
- Sport: Cycling
- Current team: Retired
- Disciplines: Track, road
- Role: Rider

Professional teams
- 2006–2007: DFL-Cyclingnews-Litespeed
- 2008–2013: Bissell

Jeremy Vennell (born 6 October 1980) is a former professional racing cyclist from New Zealand.

== Career ==
In 2012 Vennell rode to victory in the National Time Trial Championships which were held in Te Awamutu. Vennell retired in December 2013 after a 7-year cycling career.

== Major results ==
2003
10th Havant International GP
2004
1st Tour of Crete
4th Overall Tour of Southland
8th Overall Tour de Serbie
9th Overall Flèche du Sud
10th Overall Tour of Greece
2005
1st Ronde van Hoegaarden
3rd National Time Trial Championships
4th Overall Tour of Southland

1st Stage 6

4th Overall Tour of Wellington
7th Grote 1-MeiPrijs
2006
2nd Overall Tour of Southland
5th Overall New Zealand Cycle Classic
2007
7th Overall Tour of Southland

1st Stages 5 & 6

2008
4th Cascade Cycling Classic
2009
1st National Time Trial Championships
2nd Overall Tour of Wellington

1st Stage 6 (ITT)

5th US Air Force Cycling Classic
6th Overall Cascade Cycling Classic
7th Overall Tour of Southland
2010
1st Stage 1 Sea Otter Classic
2nd National Time Trial Championships
4th Overall Cascade Cycling Classic
5th Overall Tour of Elk Grove
9th Overall Redlands Bicycle Classic
2011
2nd Overall Joe Martin Stage Race
3rd Overall Cascade Cycling Classic
4th National Time Trial Championships
7th Overall Sea Otter Classic
2012
National Championships

4th Time Trial
6th Road Race

Tour of California

Most courageous, Stage 2
Most aggressive, Stage 3

1st The REV Classic
3rd Tour of the Battenkill
5th Overall Joe Martin Stage Race
7th Overall Cascade Cycling Classic
2013
6th Overall Tour of Southland
