= Jason Donald =

Jason Donald may refer to:

- Jason Donald (baseball) (born 1984), American baseball infielder
- Jason Donald (cyclist) (born 1980), American bicycle racer
