= Taylor Tolleson =

American cyclist (born 1985)

Personal information
- Born: July 13, 1985 (age 41) Pacific Grove, California, U.S.

Cycling career
- Sport: Cycling
- Current team: Retired
- Discipline: Road
- Role: Rider

Professional teams
- 2006–2007: TIAA–CREF
- 2008–2009: BMC Racing Team

Taylor Tolleson (born July 13, 1985) is an American former cyclist.

On July 23, 2009, while riding on his motorcycle, Tolleson was the victim of a hit-and-run, forcing him to end his career at 25. He suffered from severe head trauma and vertebrae fractures. He sued the driver, who was under the influence of drugs at the time of the incident.

== Major results ==
2005
1st Stage 5 Cascade Classic
2007
1st Stage 6 Tour de Toona
2008
1st Tour de Leelanau
