= Ian Boswell =

American racing cyclist (born 1991)

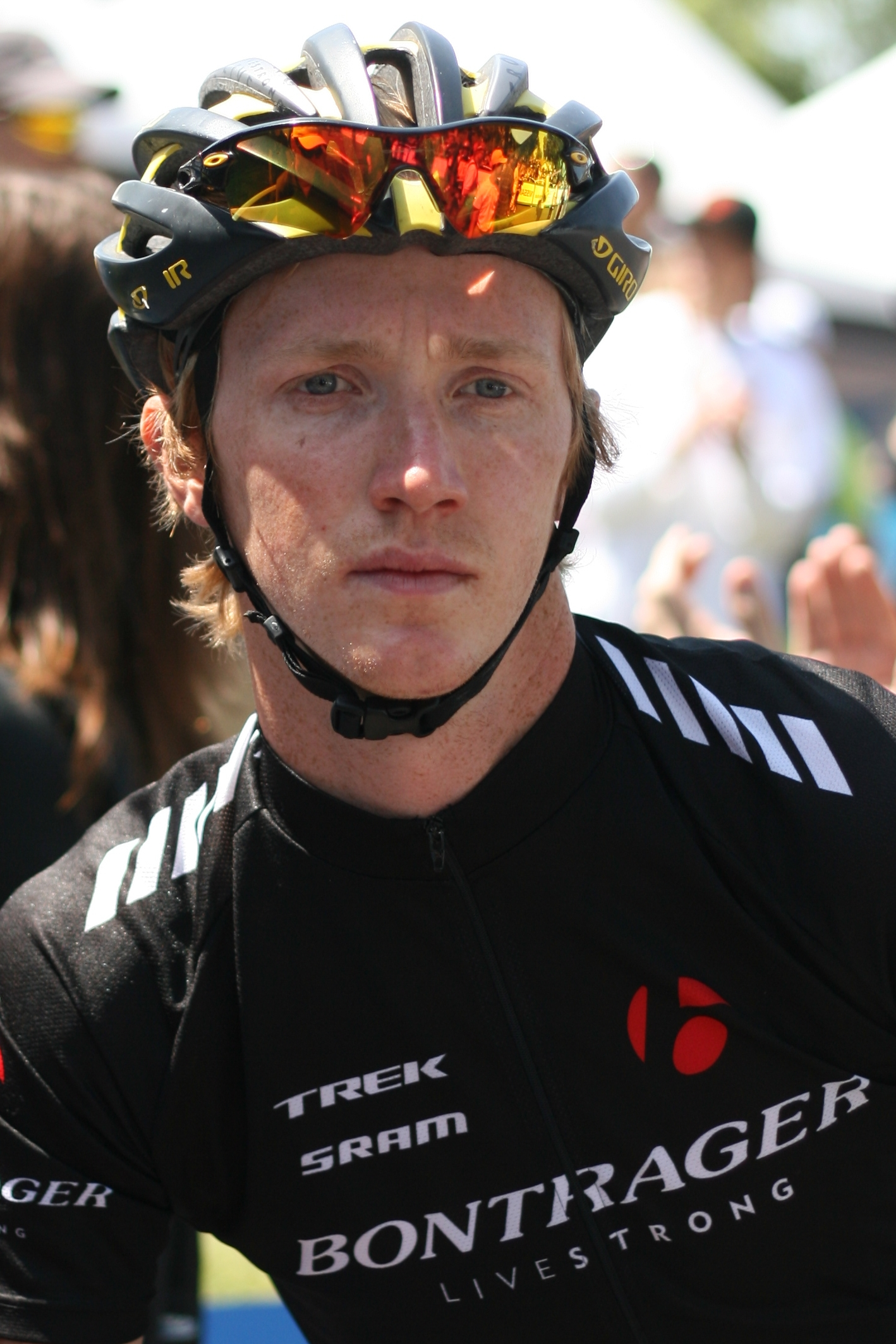
- Boswell at the 2012 Tour of California

Personal information
- Full name: Ian Boswell
- Nickname: The Boz
- Born: February 7, 1991 (age 35) Bend, Oregon, U.S.
- Height: 6 ft 1 in (185 cm)
- Weight: 154 lb (70 kg)

Cycling career
- Sport: Cycling
- Current team: Wahoo Frontiers
- Disciplines: Road (former); Gravel
- Role: Rider
- Rider type: All-rounder

Amateur teams
- 2005–2006: GS Forza Velo
- 2007: Colavita–Sutter Home (stagiaire)
- 2008: CMG Racing
- 2009: Hot Tubes
- 2012: Argos–Shimano (stagiaire)
- 2020–: Wahoo Frontiers

Professional teams
- 2010: Bissell
- 2011–2012: Trek–Livestrong
- 2013–2017: Team Sky
- 2018–2019: Team Katusha–Alpecin

Major wins
- Grand Tours Vuelta a España 1 TTT stage (2016)

Ian Boswell (born February 7, 1991) is an American off-road cyclist, who competes in gravel bike racing for the Wahoo Frontiers team. Prior to this, Boswell competed as a road racing cyclist between 2010 and 2019 for Bissell (2010), Bontrager–Livestrong (2011–2012), Argos–Shimano (2012), Team Sky (2013–2017) and Team Katusha–Alpecin (2018–2019).

== Career ==
Born in Bend, Oregon, United States, where he competed in a number of sports including high school basketball, American football, cross-country skiing and running, Boswell currently resides in Peacham, Vermont.

He was named in the start list for the 2015 Vuelta a España and the 2016 Giro d'Italia. In July 2018, he was named in the start list for the 2018 Tour de France.

He won the Unbound Gravel 200 in 2021, pipping another former WorldTour pro Laurens ten Dam to the finish.

== Major results ==
2006
3rd Road race, National Youth Road Championships
2008
2nd Time trial, National Junior Road Championships
4th Overall Tour de l'Abitibi
2010
1st Nevada City Classic
3rd Overall Tour of Utah

1st Young rider classification

2011
1st Nevada City Classic
5th Overall Cascade Cycling Classic
2012
1st Stage 5 Tour of the Gila
2nd Liège–Bastogne–Liège Espoirs
5th Overall Tour of Utah
5th Overall Tour de l'Avenir
5th Gran Premio Palio del Recioto
6th Trofeo Alcide Degasperi
2014
9th Overall Route du Sud
2015
7th Overall Tour of California
9th Trofeo Andratx–Mirador d'Es Colomer
10th Overall Tour de Langkawi
2016
1st Stage 1 (TTT) Vuelta a España
2017
5th Overall Tour of California
6th Overall Settimana Internazionale di Coppi e Bartali
8th Trofeo Pollenca–Port de Andratx
2021
1st Unbound Gravel 200
2022
3rd Unbound Gravel 200

=== Grand Tour general classification results timeline ===
Grand Tour	2015	2016	2017	2018
Giro d'Italia	—	71	—	—
Tour de France	—	—	—	79
Vuelta a España	71	80	—	126
