= Christophe Laurent =

French cyclist

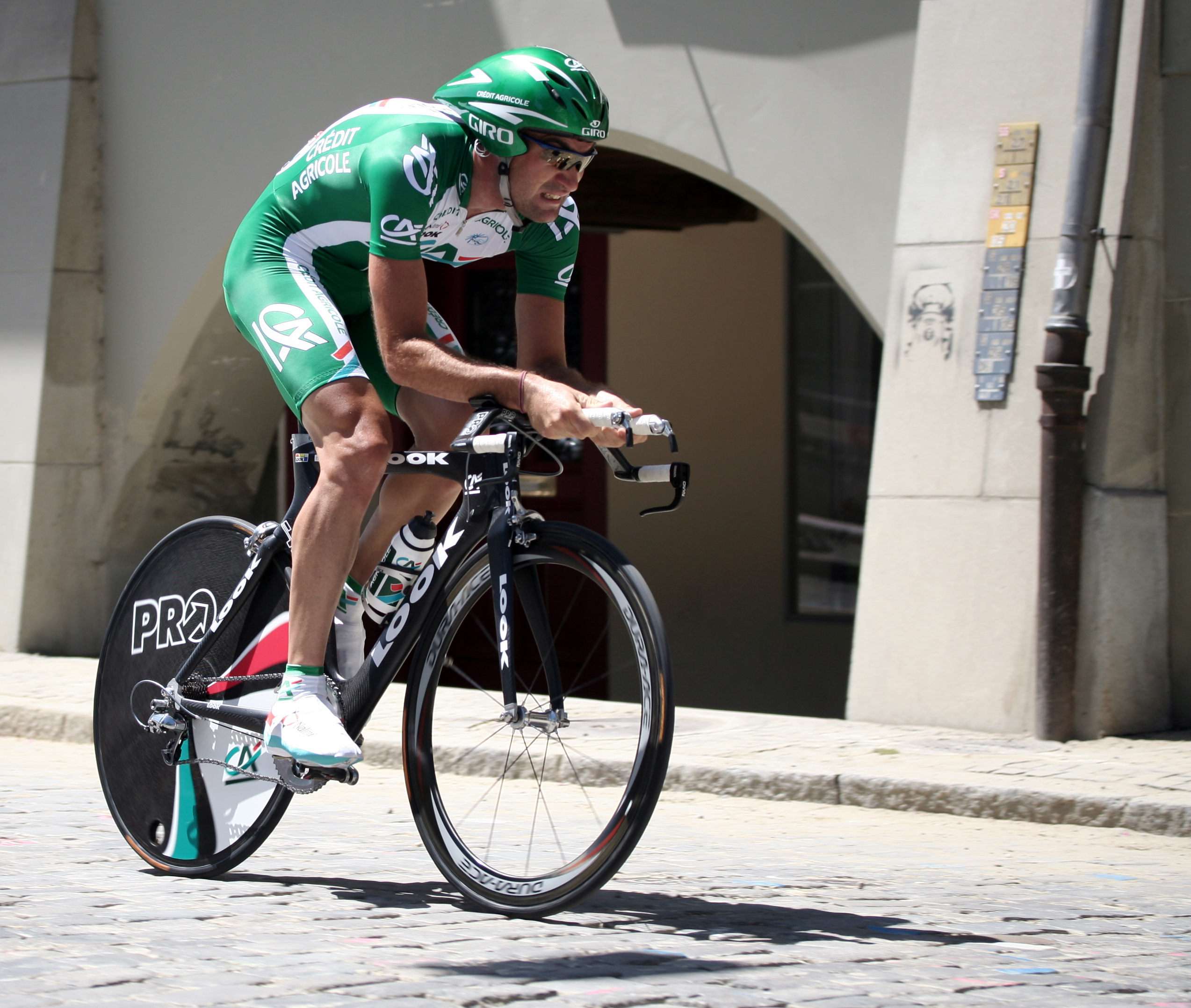
- Laurent at the 2007 Tour de Suisse

Personal information
- Full name: Christophe Laurent
- Born: 26 July 1977 (age 49) Mende, France
- Height: 1.85 m (6 ft 1 in)
- Weight: 72 kg (159 lb)

Cycling career
- Sport: Cycling
- Discipline: Road
- Role: Rider

Professional teams
- 2002–2004: Jean Delatour
- 2005–2006: Agritubel–Loudun
- 2007: Crédit Agricole
- 2008: Slipstream–Chipotle
- 2009: Agritubel

Christophe Laurent (born 26 July 1977 in Mende, Lozère) is a French former professional road cyclist.

== Major results ==
2001
1st Overall Les Boucles d'Artois
1st Stage 8 Tour de Bretagne
2nd Overall Tour de Gironde

1st Stage 3

2002
1st Mountains classification Tour de l'Avenir
2006
6th Overall Circuit de Lorraine
2007
1st Mountains classification Tour of California
2009
6th Overall Rhône-Alpes Isère Tour

1st Stage 3

7th Tour du Doubs
8th Les Boucles du Sud Ardèche
9th Overall Tour de Normandie
9th Overall Tour du Gévaudan Languedoc-Roussillon
