= Bissell (cycling team) =

American men's cycling team

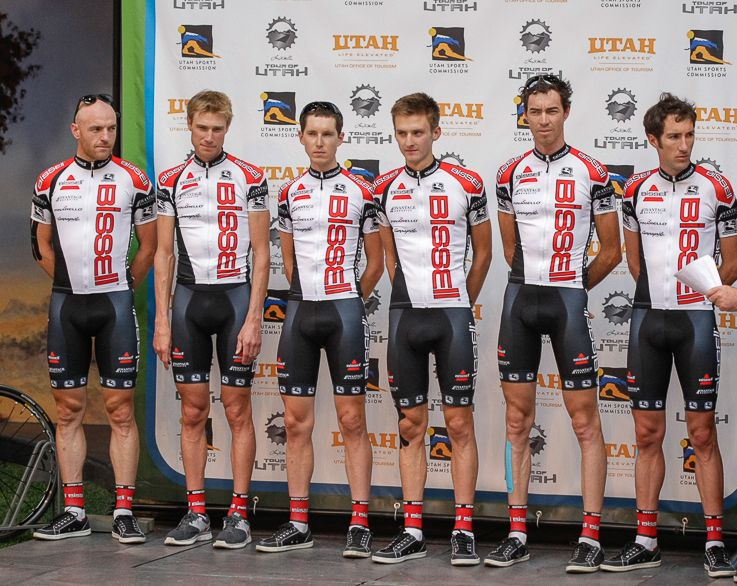
- Bissell at the 2013 Tour of Utah

Team information
- UCI code: BPC
- Registered: United States
- Founded: 2005
- Disbanded: 2013
- Discipline: Road
- Status: UCI Continental
- Website: Team home page

Key personnel
- General manager: Mark Olson
- Team manager: Glen Mitchell

Team name history
- 2005 2006 2007 2008–2013: Advantage Benefits-Endeavour; Priority Health; Priority Health-Bissell; Bissell
Jersey

Bissell Pro Cycling Team, or simply Bissell, (UCI team code: BPC) was an elite men's cycling team registered in the United States as a UCI Continental. The team competed on the USA Cycling National Racing Calendar and the UCI America Tour.

The team folded at the end of the 2013 season, after Bissell withdrew sponsorship for the team, and sponsored Axel Merckx's Bissell Development Team instead.

== Major wins ==
2005
Stage 2, Tour of Southland, Karl Menzies
Stage 5, Nature Valley Grand Prix, Richard England
2006
United States National Under-23 Time Trial Championships, Brent Bookwalter
1st New Zealand National Road Race Championships, Hayden Roulston
Overall, New Zealand Cycle Classic, Hayden Roulston

Stages 3, 5, 6 & 7, Hayden Roulston

Overall, Tour de Vineyards, Hayden Roulston

Stages 1, 2 & 3, Hayden Roulston

Overall, Nature Valley Grand Prix, Karl Menzies

Stage 1, Nathan O'Neill
Stage 2, Greg Henderson
Stage 4, Karl Menzies

Overall, Tour of Southland, Hayden Roulston

Stage 1, Hayden Roulston
Stage 3, Greg Henderson

Overall, Tour of Utah, Scott Moninger

Stage 4, Scott Moninger

Mount Evans Hill Climb, Scott Moninger
Nevada City Classic, Scott Moninger
Philadelphia International Championship, Greg Henderson
Stage 1, Tour de Toona, Karl Menzies
Stage 2, Herald Sun Tour, Karl Menzies
Stage 2, Tour of the Gila, Scott Moninger
Stage 3, Tour of the Gila, Gord Fraser
Stage 4, Cascade Classic, Nathan O'Neill
2007
Tour de Leelanau, Garrett Peltonen
Chrono Champenois, Cameron Wurf
Stage 1 & 9, Tour of Southland, Tom Zirbel
Stage 2, Cascade Classic, Ben Jacques-Maynes
Stage 7, Tour of Southland, Scott Zwizanski
2008
Stage 1, Tour of Elk Grove, Tom Zirbel
Stage 3, Nature Valley Grand Prix, Ben Jacques-Maynes
Stage 3, Tour of the Gila, Tom Zirbel
Stage 5, Tour of the Gila, Burke Swindlehurst
Stage 5, Tour de Georgia, Richard England
Stage 5, Tour of Utah, Tom Zirbel
2009
New Zealand National Time Trial Championships, Jeremy Vennell
Points classification, Tour of Southland, Patrick Bevin

Stages 4 & 7, Patrick Bevin

Team classification, Nature Valley Grand Prix
Team classification, Tour of the Gila
Stage 1, Cascade Cycling Classic, Ben Jacques-Maynes
Stage 1, Tour of Elk Grove, Tom Zirbel
Stage 3, Cascade Cycling Classic, Tom Zirbel
1st Stage 6, Tour of Wellington, Jeremy Vennell
2010
National Criterium Championships, Daniel Holloway
Young rider classification, Tour of Utah, Ian Boswell
Team classification, Redlands Bicycle Classic
Team classification, Tour of Elk Grove
Nevada City Classic, Ian Boswell
Stages, 1 & 2, Tour de Vineyards, Patrick Bevin
Stages, 2 & 3, Sea Otter Classic, Paul Mach
Stage, 1, Sea Otter Classic, Jeremy Vennell
Stage 1, Tour of Southland, Jeremy Vennell
Stage 1, Tour of Elk Grove, Peter Latham
2011
National Criterium Championships, Eric Young
Overall, Tour de Vineyards, Patrick Bevin

Stage 1, Patrick Bevin

Mountains classification, Nature Valley Grand Prix, Kyle Wamsley
Team classification, Nature Valley Grand Prix
Team classification, Cascade Cycling Classic
Prologue, Tour of Southland, Jeremy Vennell
Stage 2, Tour of the Gila, Frank Pipp
Stage 8, Tour of Southland, Patrick Bevin
2012
Points classification, Tour of the Gila, Eric Young

Stage 2, Eric Young

Young rider classification, Cascade Cycling Classic, Carter Jones
Mountains classification, Tour of Utah, Ben Jacques-Maynes
Team classification, Redlands Bicycle Classic
Univest Grand Prix, Patrick Bevin
Stages 1, 2 &3, Redlands Bicycle Classic, Patrick Bevin
Stages 1 & 2, Tour of Southland, Patrick Bevin
Stage 5, Tour of Southland, Carter Jones
2013
Overall, Sea Otter Classic, Kirk Carlsen

Stage 3, Kirk Carlsen

Mountains classification, Tour of California, Carter Jones
Mountains classification, Tour de Beauce, Pat McCarty
Mountains classification, Tour of Utah, Michael Torckler
Stage 1, Cascade Cycling Classic, Phil Gaimon

== Team roster ==
As of January 17, 2013.

| Rider | Date of birth |
|---|---|
| Christopher Baldwin (USA) | 15 October 1975 (aged 37) |
| Patrick Bevin (NZL) | 2 May 1991 (aged 21) |
| Mac Brennan (USA) | 15 July 1990 (aged 22) |
| Nicolai Brøchner (DEN) | 4 July 1993 (aged 19) |
| Andrew Dahlheim (USA) | 9 June 1988 (aged 24) |
| Phillip Gaimon (USA) | 28 January 1986 (aged 26) |
| Carter Jones (USA) | 27 February 1989 (aged 23) |

| Rider | Date of birth |
|---|---|
| Julian Kyer (USA) | 15 May 1988 (aged 24) |
| Jason McCartney (USA) | 3 September 1973 (aged 39) |
| Pat McCarty (USA) | 24 January 1982 (aged 30) |
| Tommy Nankervis (AUS) | 21 January 1983 (aged 29) |
| Frank Pipp (USA) | 22 May 1977 (aged 35) |
| Michael Torckler (NZL) | 12 April 1987 (aged 25) |
| Jeremy Vennell (NZL) | 6 October 1980 (aged 32) |
