= Kirk Carlsen =

American cyclist (born 1987)

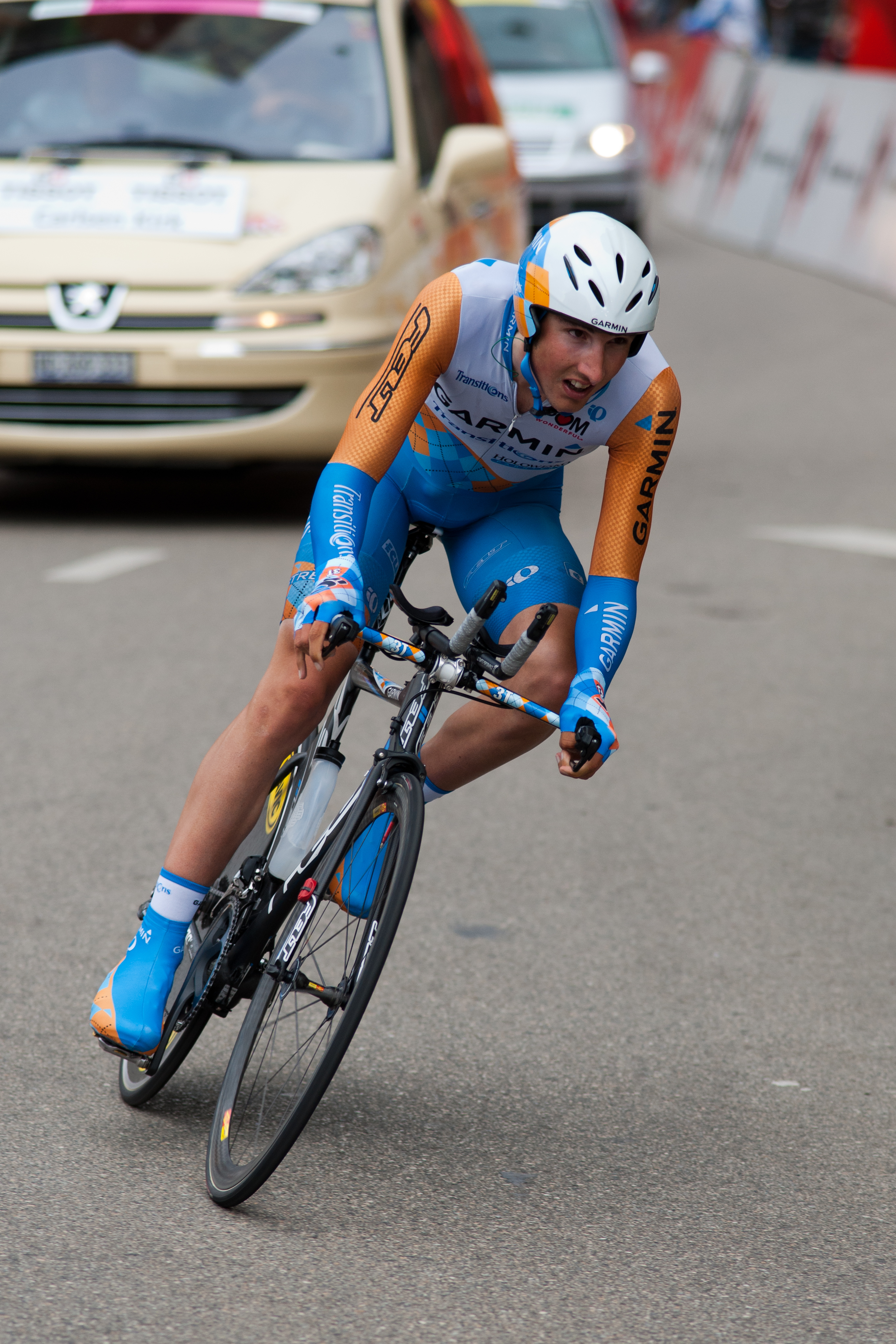
- Carlsen at the 2010 Tour de Romandie

Personal information
- Full name: Kirk R. Carlsen
- Born: May 25, 1987 (age 39) Nashua, New Hampshire

Cycling career
- Sport: Cycling
- Current team: Retired
- Discipline: Road
- Role: Rider

Amateur teams
- 2011: SugarLabs
- 2013: Predator Carbon Repair
- 2013: H&R Block (guest)

Professional teams
- 2010: Garmin–Transitions
- 2011: Chipotle–Garmin Development Team
- 2012: Wonderful Pistachios
- 2012: Team Exergy
- 2013: Bissell
- 2014: Jelly Belly–Maxxis

Kirk R. Carlsen (born May 25, 1987) is an American former professional cyclist, who competed professionally between 2010 and 2014. He previously rode for Garmin–Transitions. He grew up in New Hampshire, and among his best results include several European victories with the U.S. National Team, U.S. U23 National Champion in 2008, and best climber at the Redlands Classic in 2009. Before Garmin, Carlsen rode for Garmin's development program, the U.S. National Team, Rubicon, and Peerless Insurance Junior Cycling Team.

Carlsen joined the Jelly Belly–Maxxis squad for the 2014 season, after his previous team – Bissell – folded at the end of the 2013 season. He retired after the 2014 season.

== Major results ==
2008
1st Road race, National Under-23 Road Championships
1st GP Ost-Fenster
1st Mountains classification Redlands Classic
1st Points classification Le Tour des Pays de Savoie
2009
10th Eschborn-Frankfurt City Loop U23
2013
1st Overall Sea Otter Classic

1st Stage 3

7th Overall Tour de Beauce
2014
4th Overall Tour of the Gila
5th Overall Tour de Beauce
