= Tour de Leelanau =

Tour de Leelanau was a USA Cycling road bicycle racing event held annually from 2005 to 2008 in Leelanau County, Michigan (near Traverse City).

Starting in 2007, the men's event is sanctioned by the Union Cycliste Internationale (UCI) and serves as the last stop on the 2006–07 UCI America Tour and the 2007 USA Cycling Professional Tour.

== Route ==
The Tour de Leelanau is a point-to-point open road race that runs through much of the Leelanau Peninsula including the villages of Leland, Maple City, Empire, Glen Arbor, Cedar, Lake Leelanau, Suttons Bay, and Northport before the finish at Leelanau Sands Casino in Peshawbestown, Michigan. In 2008 the men's course was 109.5 miles; the women's course 69.5 miles.

== Past winners ==
=== Men's ===
- 2005 : (United States) Nicholas Reistad, Advantage Benefits–Endeavour
- 2006 : (United States) Eddy Hilger, Priority Health
- 2007 : (United States) Garrett Peltonen, Priority Health–Bissell
- 2008 : (United States) Taylor Tolleson, BMC Racing Team

=== Women's ===
- 2005 : (United States) Mackenzie Woodring, Advantage Benefits–Endeavour
- 2006 : (United States) Mackenzie Woodring, Priority Health
- 2007 : (United States) Tina Pic, Priority Health–Bissell
- 2008 : (Canada) Anne Samplonius, Cheerwine
