= Lucas Euser =

American cyclist (born 1983)

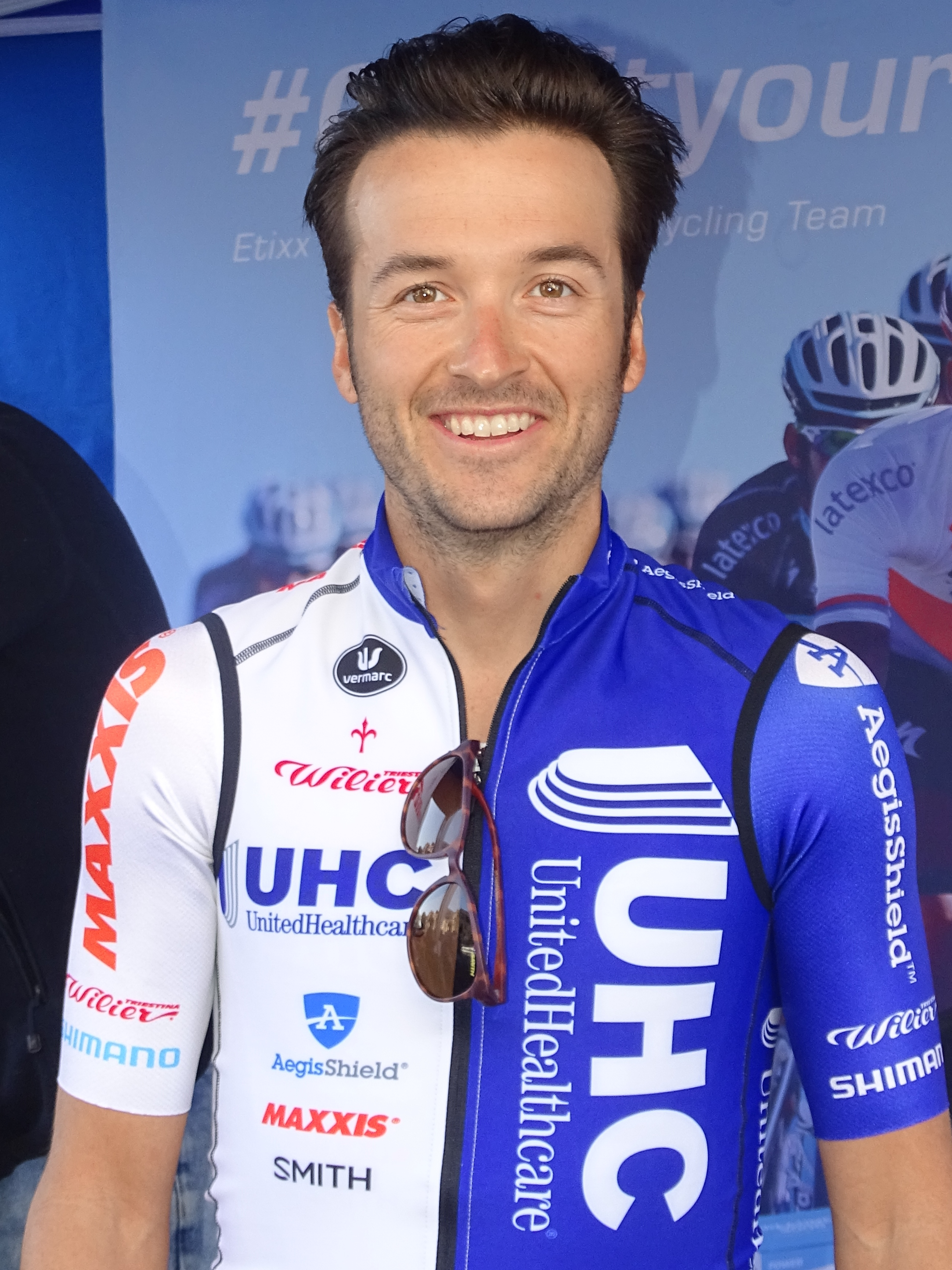

Personal information
- Born: December 5, 1983 (age 42) Napa, California
- Height: 1.7 m (5 ft 7 in)
- Weight: 56 kg (123 lb)

Cycling career
- Sport: Cycling
- Current team: Retired
- Discipline: Road
- Role: Rider

Professional teams
- 2005: Webcor Builders
- 2006–2009: TIAA–CREF
- 2010–2012: SpiderTech–Planet Energy
- 2013–2015: UnitedHealthcare

Lucas Euser (born December 5, 1983, in Napa, California) is an American former professional road cyclist. After witnessing a crash whilst competing in the 2014 US National Road Race, he stayed alongside fellow American cyclist Taylor Phinney. Following this experience, he retired, and they remain good friends.

== Major results ==
2006
1st Mount Tamalpais Hill Climb
2007
1st Mount Tamalpais Hill Climb
7th Overall Vuelta a Chihuahua
9th Overall Tour de Georgia
2008
1st Univest Grand Prix
1st Stage 4 Tour de Georgia (TTT)
4th Road race, National Road Championships
2009
8th Overall Tour de Langkawi
2011
9th Overall Tour of Utah
2012
8th Overall Tour of Utah
2013
4th Overall Tour of Utah
7th Overall Tour of the Gila
8th Overall Tour de Beauce
8th Bucks County Classic
