= Jason Donald (cyclist) =

American cyclist (born 1980)

Personal information
- Full name: Jason Donald
- Born: January 30, 1980 (age 46) United States

Cycling career
- Sport: Cycling
- Discipline: Road
- Role: Rider

Professional teams
- 2007–2009: Slipstream–Chipotle
- 2010: OUCH-Bahati Foundation
- 2011: Kelly Benefit Strategies–OptumHealth

Jason Donald (born January 30, 1980, in Winter Park, Colorado) is an elite men's road bicycle racing professional from Brighton, Colorado. Donald last rode for the Kelly Benefit Strategies–OptumHealth team, and is the former NCCA Road Champion.

== Major results ==
2007 – Slipstream–Chipotle

- 2nd, Prologue (ITT), Tour of California
- 2nd, Prologue (ITT), Tour of the Bahamas

2006 – Team Einstein's Cycling

- 1st, Stage 5, Tour of the Gila
- 3rd, Overall, La Vuelta de Bisbee
- 5th, Overall, Joe Martin Stage Race
- Stage 5 Most Aggressive Rider, Nature Valley Grand Prix

2005 – RMCEF

- 5th, Bob Cook Memorial Mt Evans Hillclimb
