= Caleb Fairly =

American cyclist (born 1987)

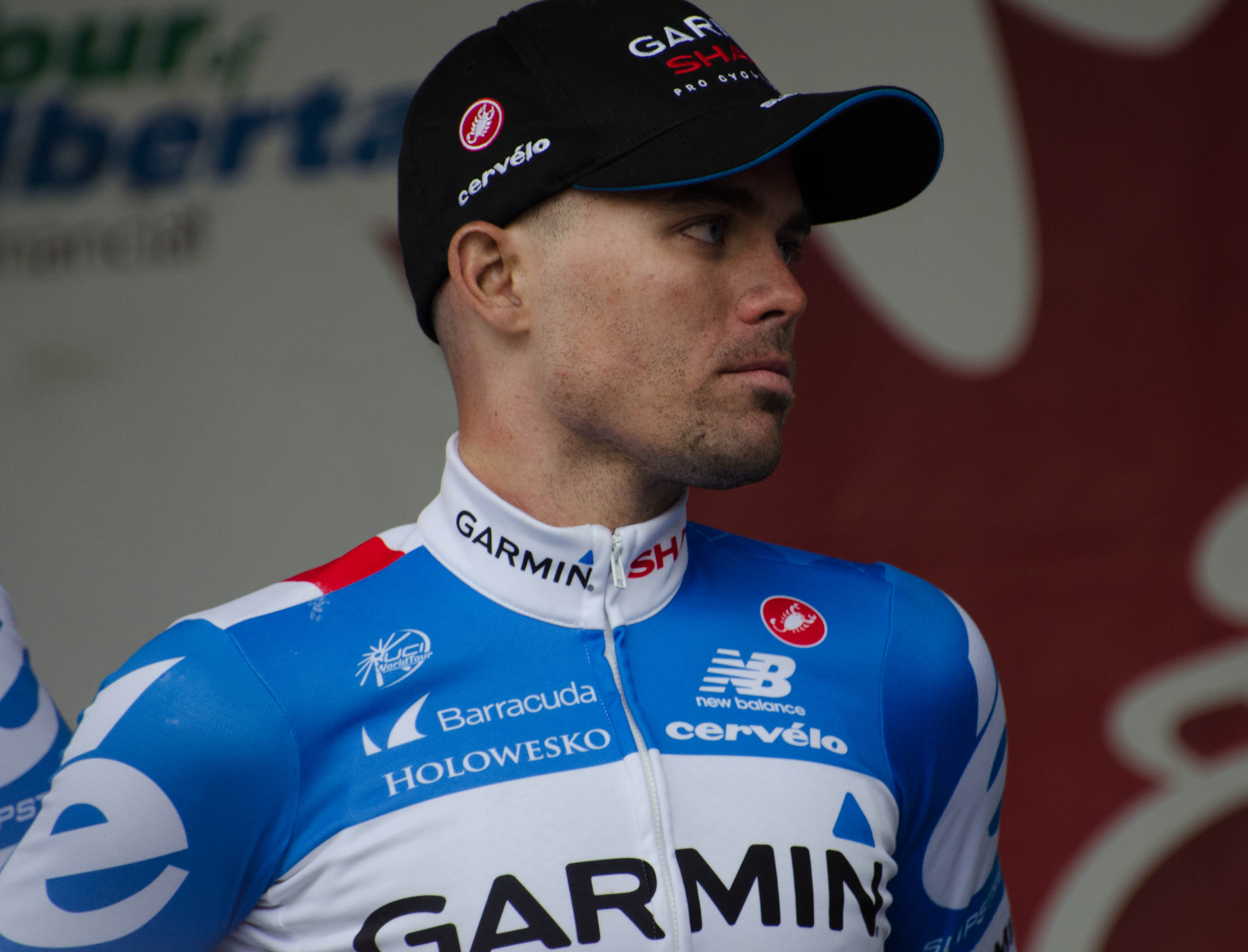
- Fairly at the 2014 Tour of Alberta

Personal information
- Full name: Caleb Fairly
- Born: February 19, 1987 (age 39) Amarillo, Texas, United States
- Height: 1.70 m (5 ft 7 in)
- Weight: 60 kg (132 lb)

Cycling career
- Sport: Cycling
- Current team: Retired
- Discipline: Road
- Role: Rider
- Rider type: Climber

Amateur teams
- 2004: Ochsner
- 2004–2005: Hot Tubes Cycling
- 2006: CRCA–Sakonnet Technology
- 2008–2010: VMG–Felt
- 2010: → Garmin–Transitions

Professional teams
- 2011: HTC–Highroad
- 2012: SpiderTech–C10
- 2013–2014: Garmin–Sharp
- 2015–2016: Team Giant–Alpecin

Major wins
- Tour of the Battenkill (2010); Tour of the Bahamas (2010)

Caleb Fairly (born February 19, 1987) is an American former professional road racing cyclist, who rode professionally between 2011 and 2016 for the HTC–Highroad, SpiderTech–C10, Garmin–Sharp and Team Giant–Alpecin teams.

== Personal ==
Born in Amarillo, Texas, United States, Fairly resides in Colorado Springs, Colorado, United States. During the season, he resides in Girona, Catalonia, Spain.

== Career ==
Fairly signed with HTC–Highroad, a UCI ProTeam, for the 2011 and 2012 seasons. HTC–Highroad folded following the 2011 season.

Fairly transferred to SpiderTech–C10, a UCI Professional Continental team, for the 2012 season. He signed with Garmin–Sharp, a UCI ProTeam, for the 2013 and 2014 seasons. Fairly signed with Team Giant–Alpecin, a UCI ProTeam, for the 2015 season. Fairly announced his retirement ahead of the 2016 Tour of California, with the race being his last.

== Major results ==
2006
10th Road race, National Under-23 Road Championships
2008
National Under-23 Road Championships

4th Time trial
7th Road race

2009
4th Time trial, National Under-23 Road Championships
6th Overall Olympia's Tour
2010
1st Overall Tour of the Bahamas

1st Stage 3

1st Tour of the Battenkill
3rd Giro di Toscana
2013
6th Road race, National Road Championships
