= Tour of the Battenkill =

Race details
- Region: New York, United States
- Discipline: Road
- Competition: UCI America Tour
- Web site: anthemsportstours.com/battenkill

History
- First edition: 2005
- Editions: 15 (as of 2021)
- Most recent: Brian Oliver (USA)

The Tour of the Battenkill was a single-day road cycling race held in the Battenkill valley, in Washington County, New York. It was 62.2 miles long, includes many hills, dirt and gravel road sections and as of 2011 it has been held seven times. From 2010 to 2012, the race was rated as a 1.2 event on the UCI America Tour.

Tour of the Battenkill founder Dieter Drake of Anthem Sports sold the event to Rugged Races in late 2017. Rugged Maniac was then purchased by Gannett Media who then ran the event under their endurance sports division, Ventures Endurance through 2024.

In October of 2024, it was announced that the Tour of the Battenkill will return (in 2027), and be organized by its original founder, Dieter Drake of Anthem Sports under a new name — "Battenkill" — after Ventures Endurance declined to continue with the event. Battenkill will return to the Village of Cambridge, NY where it was held from 2009 through 2014.

Battenkill is preparing to return to the UCI international calendar with an Elite Men’s UCI 1.2 road race on May 22, 2027.

== Results ==
Year	Date	Participants	Men's Winner	Time	Women's Winner	Time	Men's 2nd place	Men's 3rd place
2009	19 April		Scott Nydam				Karl Menzies	François Parisien
2010	18 April	2585	Caleb Fairly	4:57:07			Floyd Landis	Jay Robert Thomson
2011	11 April	3093	Brett Tivers	4:07:37	Lex Albrecht		Jesse Anthony	Brendan Housler
2012	15 April	3180	Francisco Mancebo	4:55:54	Véronique Fortin	3:00:38	Jesse Anthony	Jeremy Vennell
2013	13,14 April	3376	Adam Farabaugh	3:30:12			Simon Lambert Lemay	Cameron Cogburn
2014	3,4 May	2740	Scott Zwizanski	4:24:00	Kathleen Giles		Tim Mitchell	Eneas Freyre
2015	20 April							
2016	21 May		Curtis White				Pier-André Côté	Nicolas Ducharme
2017								
2018	28 April							
2019			Nicolas Rivard	3:29:26			Paul Davis	Jeremy Powers
2020								
2021	19 June		Jacob Hacker	3:30:02			Justin Parker	Taylor Delhagen
2022	7 May		Luke Valenti	3:27:10	Lea Davison	3:37:04	Jacob Hacker	Theo De Groote
2023	29 April		Brian Oliver	3:50:14	Denise Esposito	4:41:34	Daniel Durango	Kurt Dericks
