= Martin Wesemann =

South African cyclist

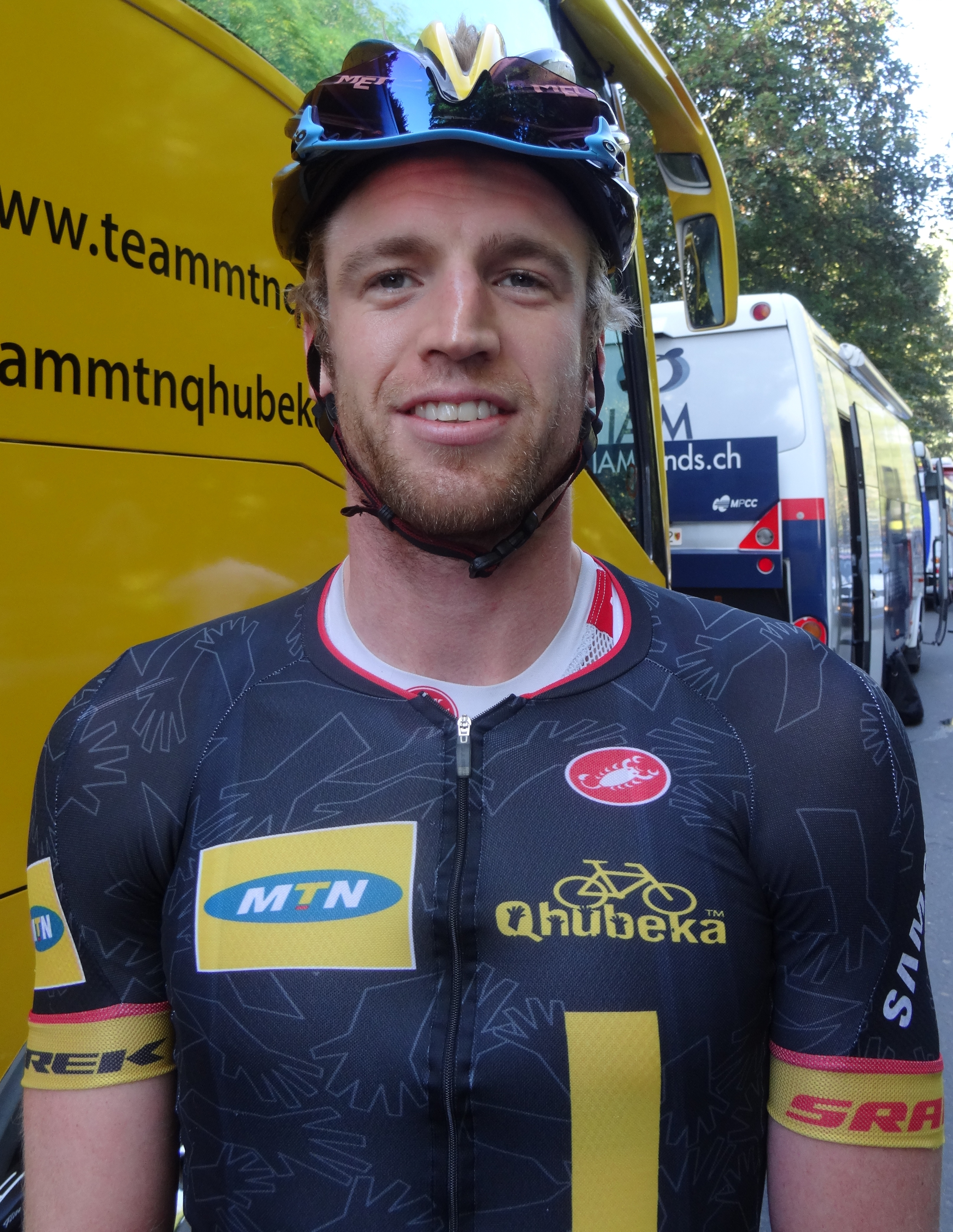
- Wesemann in 2014

Personal information
- Born: 19 March 1984 (age 42) Cape Town, South Africa

Cycling career
- Sport: Cycling
- Role: Rider

Martin Wesemann (born 19 March 1984) is a South African racing cyclist. He rode at the 2013 UCI Road World Championships.

== Major results ==
2011
1st Deutsche Bank Cycle Tour
5th Overall Tour du Maroc
13th Overall Tour of China
2012
13th Overall Tour du Maroc
13th Overall Flèche du Sud
2013
19th Overall Tour de Korea

1st Stage 5 (TTT)

2014
13th Overall Tour de Korea

2nd Stage 6
