= Scott Zwizanski =

American cyclist

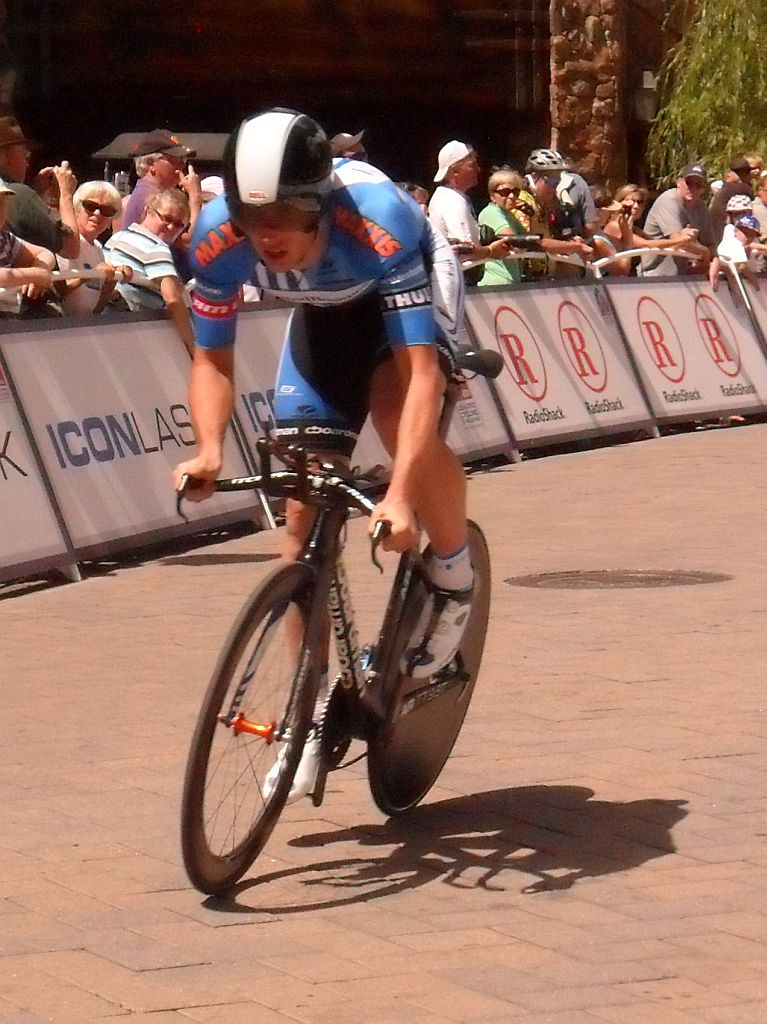

Personal information
- Born: May 29, 1977 (age 49) West Chester, Pennsylvania, U.S.

Cycling career
- Sport: Cycling
- Discipline: Road
- Role: Rider
- Rider type: Time trialist

Professional teams
- 2004: Ofoto-Lombardi Sports
- 2005–2006: Kodakgallery.com-Sierra Nevada
- 2007–2008: Bissell
- 2009–2010: Optum p/b Kelly Benefit Strategies
- 2011: UnitedHealthcare
- 2012–2015: Optum p/b Kelly Benefit Strategies

Major wins
- Tour de Beauce (2009)

Scott Zwizanski (born May 29, 1977) is an American cyclist. He won the Tour de Beauce in 2009. He was born in West Chester, Pennsylvania.

== Palmarès ==
2003
1st Tour of Christiana

1st stage 2

2004
2nd overall Tobago Cycling Classic
2005
1st Tour of Medford, New Jersey
2007
1st stage 5 Tour of Southland
2008
1st Bank of America Wilmington
2009
2nd stage La Primavera at Lago Vista
1st Vuelta Ciclista del Uruguay

1st stage 7

1st Tour de Beauce:

1st stage 4

3rd overall U.S. Air Force Classic
3rd United States National Time Trial Championships
2010
2nd overall Nature Valley Grand Prix
1st stage 1 Nature Valley Grand Prix (time trial)
