= Joseph Lewis (cyclist) =

Australian bicycle racer

Personal information
- Full name: Joseph D. Lewis
- Nickname: Joe
- Born: 13 January 1989 (age 37)

Cycling career
- Sport: Cycling
- Discipline: Road
- Role: Rider

Amateur teams
- 2012: RBS Morgans–ATS
- 2020–2021: Team Clif Bar

Professional teams
- 2008: FRF Couriers–NSWIS
- 2009–2010: Drapac–Porsche Cycling
- 2011: Trek–Livestrong
- 2012–2018: BMC–Hincapie Sportswear Team

Joseph D. Lewis (born 13 January 1989) is an Australian cyclist, who most recently rode for American amateur team Team Clif Bar.

== Major results ==
2007
Top End Tour

1st Stages 4 & 5

Brindabella Challenge

1st Stages 1 & 2

2008
3rd Overall Tour of Bright
2009
1st Stage 8 Tour of Tasmania
3rd Overall Tour du New Caledonia
4th Time trial, Oceania Under-23 Road Championships
2010
1st Overall Tour of Bright

1st Stage 1

2nd Tour of Gippsland
8th Overall Rás Tailteann
2011
1st Stage 4 Tour of the Gila
3rd Road race, National Under-23 Road Championships
7th Overall Herald Sun Tour
2013
1st Overall Labor Day Omnium

1st Stage 2

2nd Bucks County Classic
10th Philadelphia International Cycling Classic
2014
2nd Winston-Salem Cycling Classic
2015
3rd Winston-Salem Cycling Classic
8th Overall Bay Classic Series
2018
1st Points classification Colorado Classic
