= Sea Otter Classic =

Annual cycling and outdoor sports festival in Monterey, California

Race details
- Date: April 15-18, 2027
- Region: Monterey, California USA
- Local name: Sea Otter
- Competition: Professional/Amateur
- Type: Multi-discipline
- Organiser: Sea Otter Classic, Inc.
- Race director: J. Frost
- Web site: www.seaotterclassic.com

History
- First edition: 1991 Laguna Seca Challenge; 06–07 April 1991
- Editions: 28

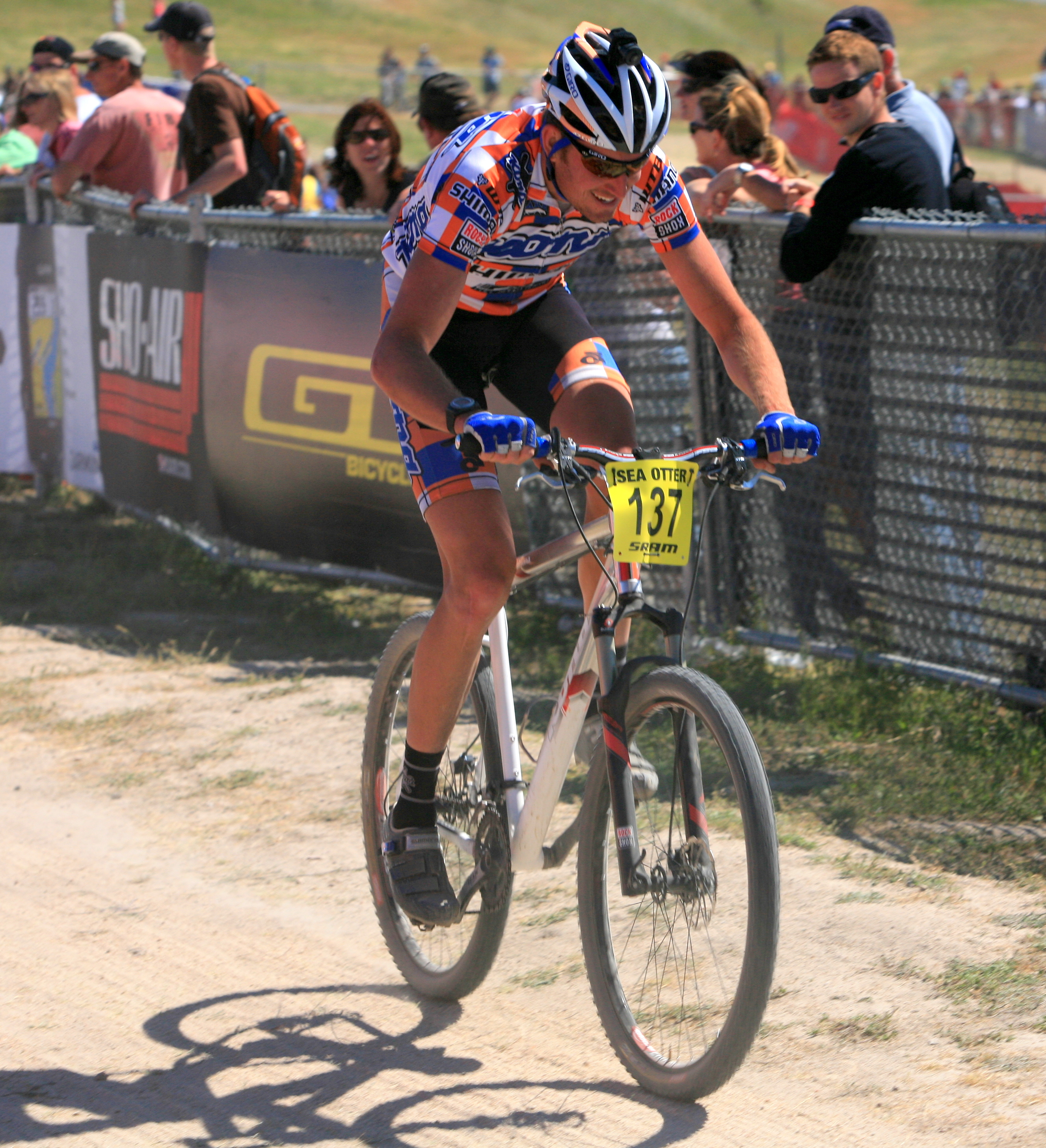
Ryan Trebon during the Elite Men's Short Track race at the 2009 Sea Otter Classic in Laguna Seca

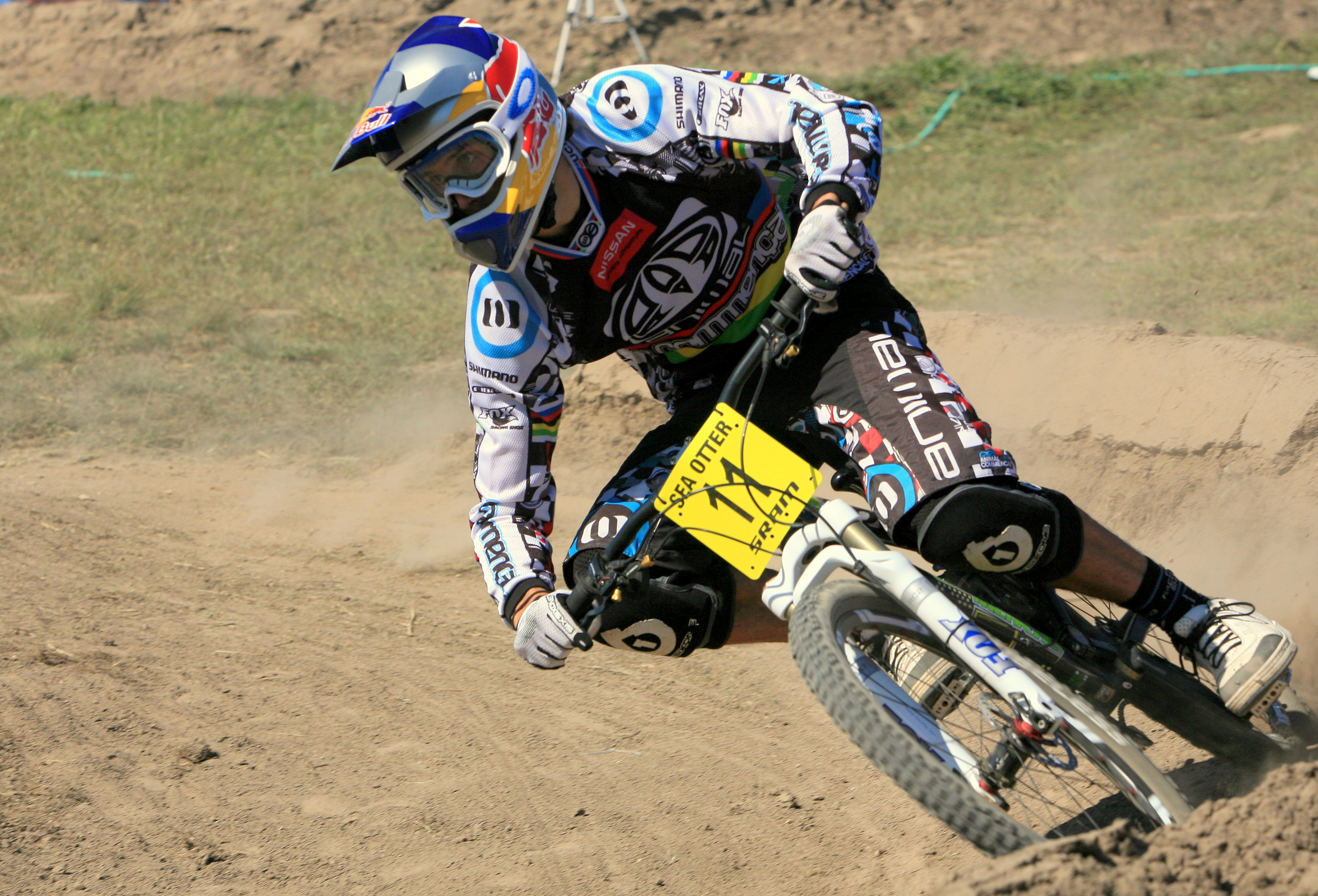
Gee Atherton at the 2009 Sea Otter Classic

The Sea Otter Classic is a bicycling and outdoor sports festival and exposition held each spring since 1991 at the WeatherTech Raceway Laguna Seca in Monterey, California. The four-day event is considered the world's largest cycling festival, drawing nearly 10,000 professional and amateur athletes and 74,000 fans. The Sea Otter Classic is named in honor of the southern sea otter, an indigenous mammal which flourishes along the neighboring Pacific coast.

The Sea Otter Classic was founded by Frank Yohannan and Lou Rudolph. The inaugural event was held 06–07 April 1991. The first two events were held under the name Laguna Seca Challenge. The event name was changed to the Sea Otter Classic in 1993.

In August 2021, Frank Yohannan, who has owned and operated the Sea Otter Classic for more than 30 years, found a new owner for the event — Life Time, Inc., a multi-billion dollar fitness and event company. Despite the change in ownership Yohannan will remain as director.

== Lists of Winners ==
Year	Enduro	Cross Country	Short Track	Super D	Downhill	Dual Slalom	Road Stage Race	Circuit Race	Criterium	Road Race	Time Trial
2016	Jared Graves (Australia); Teal Stetson-Lee (United States)	Todd Wells (United States); Katerina Nash (United States)	Geoff Kabush; Chloe Woodruff
2015		Nino Schurter (Switzerland)	Nino Schurter (Switzerland)
2014	Josh Carlson (United States); Kelli Emmett (United States)	Christoph Sauser (Switzerland); Marianne Vos (Netherlands)	Todd Wells (United States); Marianne Vos (Netherlands)		Brian Lopes (United States); Anneke Beerten (Netherlands)	Cody Kelley (United States); Luana Oliveira (United States)		Tyler Magner (United States); Leah Kirchmann (Canada)	Remi Pelletier-roy (Canada); Kendall Ryan (United States)	Joe Schmalz (United States); Alison Tetrick (United States)
2013		Miguel Martinez (France); Marianne Vos (Netherlands)	Geoff Kabush (Canada); Marianne Vos (Netherlands)		Aaron Gwin (United States); Jill Kintner (United States)	Jared Graves (Australia); Jill Kintner (United States)	Kirk Carlsen (United States); Jacquelyn Crowell (United States)	Daniel Holloway (United States); Jacquelyn Crowell (United States)	Cole House (United States); Jade Wilcoxson (United States)	Alexander Hagman (United States); Jade Wicoxson (United States)	Kirk Carlsen (United States); Alison Tetrick (United States)
2012		Geoff Kabush (Canada); Georgia Gould (United States)	Max Plaxton (Canada); Katerina Nash (Czech Republic)		Jared Graves (Australia); Jill Kintner (United States)	Kyle Strait (United States); Jill Kintner (United States)	Andy Jacques-Maynes (United States); Alison Powers (United States)	James Wingert (United States); Alison Powers (United States)	Andy Jacques-Maynes (United States); Alison Powers (United States)	Matt Cooke (United States); Alison Powers (United States)	Nate English (United States); Alison Powers (United States)
2011		Todd Wells (United States); Emily Batty (Canada)	Max Plaxton (Canada); Georgia Gould (United States)		Jared Graves (Australia); Melissa Buhl (United States)	Jared Graves (Australia); Jill Kintner (United States)	Francisco Mancebo (Spain); Kristin Armstrong Savola (United States)	Raul Cancado (Brazil); Jade Wilcoxson (United States)	Cole House (United States); Kristin Armstrong Savola (United States)	Francisco Mancebo (Spain); Kristin Armstrong Savola (United States)	Francisco Mancebo (Spain); Kristin Armstrong Savola (United States)
2010		Burry Stander (South Africa); Georgia Gould (United States)	Todd Wells (United States); Georgia Gould (United States)	Carl Decker (United States); Kelli Emmett (United States)	Jared Graves (Australia); Melissa Buhl (United States)	Mick Hannah (Australia); Jill Kintner (United States)		Paul Mach (United States); Alison Powers (United States)	Jeremy Vennell (New Zealand); Amanda Miller (United States)	Paul Mach (United States); Carmen Small (United States)
2009		Christoph Sauser (Switzerland); Georgia Gould (United States)	Todd Wells (United States); Emily Batty (Canada)	Carl Decker (United States); Kelli Emmett (United States)	Mick Hannah (Australia); Tracy Moseley (United Kingdom)	Sam Hill (Australia); Melissa Buhl (United States)			Morgan Schmitt (United States); Kelly Benjamin (United States)	Levi Leipheimer (United States); Tiffany Cromwell (Australia)
2008		Miguel Martinez (France); Kelli Emmett (United States)	Sam Schultz (United States); Lea Davison (United States)	Carl Decker (United States); Lea Davison (United States)	Greg Minnaar (South Africa); Melissa Buhl (United States)	Greg Minnaar (South Africa); Sabrina Jonnier (France)			Michael Grabinger Jr. (United States); Tiffany Cromwell (Australia)		Evan Oliphant (United Kingdom); Dotsie Bausch (United States)
2007		Geoff Kabush (Canada); Georgia Gould (United States)	Jean Christophe Peraud (France); Katie Compton (United States)	Adam Craig (United States); Kelli Emmett (United States)	Nathan Rennie (Australia); Rachel Atherton (United Kingdom)	Mick Hannah (Australia); Sabrina Jonnier (France)		Daniel Ramsey (United States); Shelley Olds (United States)		Andrew Bajadali (United States); Jane Despas (United States)
2006		Liam Killeen (United Kingdom); Gunn-Rita Dahle Flesjaa (Norway)	Adam Craig (United States); Gunn-Rita Dahle Flesjaa (Norway)	Jared Graves (Australia); Tracy Moseley (United Kingdom)	Brian Lopes (United States); Tracy Moseley (United Kingdom)		Matty Rice (Australia); Tina Pic (United States)
2005		Geoff Kabush (Canada); Alison Sydor (Canada)
2004		Filip Meirhaeghe (Belgium); Alison Dunlap (United States)
2003		Roland Green (Canada); Alison Dunlap (United States)
2002		Roland Green (Canada); Alison Dunlap (United States)
2001		Bart Brentjens (Netherlands); Caroline Alexander (United Kingdom)
2000		Bas Van Dooren (Netherlands); Laurence Leboucher (France)
1999		Cadel Evans (Australia); Alison Dunlap (United States)
1998		Cadel Evans (Australia)
1997		Jérôme Chiotti (France)	Jérôme Chiotti (France)
1996		Miguel Martinez (France)	Andrés Brenes (Costa Rica)
