= 2013 Garmin–Sharp season =

2013 Garmin–Sharp season
Manager	Jonathan Vaughters
One-day victories	1
Stage race overall victories	3
Stage race stage victories	11
Previous season • Next season

The 2013 season for the Garmin–Sharp cycling team began in January at the Tour Down Under. As a UCI ProTeam, they were automatically invited and obligated to send a squad to every event in the UCI World Tour.

== Team roster ==
As of September 9, 2013.

Rider	Date of birth
Jack Bauer (NZL)	April 7, 1985 (aged 27)
Tom Danielson (USA)	March 13, 1978 (aged 34)
Thomas Dekker (NED)	September 6, 1984 (aged 28)
Rohan Dennis (AUS)	May 28, 1990 (aged 22)
Caleb Fairly (USA)	February 19, 1987 (aged 25)
Tyler Farrar (USA)	June 2, 1984 (aged 28)
Koldo Fernández (ESP)	September 13, 1981 (aged 31)
Nathan Haas (AUS)	March 12, 1989 (aged 23)
Ryder Hesjedal (CAN)	December 9, 1980 (aged 32)
Alex Howes (USA)	January 1, 1988 (aged 25)
Robert Hunter (RSA)	April 22, 1977 (aged 35)
Andreas Klier (Note: Klier announced his retirement from professional cycling on May 13.) (GER)	January 15, 1976 (aged 36)
Michel Kreder (NED)	August 15, 1987 (aged 25)
Raymond Kreder (NED)	November 26, 1989 (aged 23)
Martijn Maaskant (NED)	July 27, 1983 (aged 29)
Dan Martin (IRE)	August 20, 1986 (aged 26)

Rider	Date of birth
David Millar (GBR)	January 4, 1977 (aged 35)
Lachlan Morton (AUS)	January 2, 1992 (aged 20)
Ramūnas Navardauskas (LTU)	January 30, 1988 (aged 24)
Nick Nuyens (BEL)	May 5, 1980 (aged 32)
Glenn O'Shea (Note: O'Shea joined the team on August 28 as a stagiaire, from the An Post–Chain Reaction team.) (AUS)	June 14, 1989 (aged 23)
Alex Rasmussen (Note: Rasmussen rejoined the team on March 16, upon the completion of an 18-month ban.) (DEN)	June 9, 1984 (aged 28)
Jacob Rathe (USA)	March 13, 1991 (aged 21)
Sébastien Rosseler (BEL)	July 15, 1981 (aged 31)
Peter Stetina (USA)	August 8, 1987 (aged 25)
Andrew Talansky (USA)	November 23, 1988 (aged 24)
Christian Vande Velde (USA)	May 22, 1976 (aged 36)
Johan Vansummeren (BEL)	February 4, 1981 (aged 31)
Steele Von Hoff (AUS)	December 31, 1987 (aged 25)
Fabian Wegmann (GER)	June 20, 1980 (aged 32)
David Zabriskie (USA)	January 12, 1979 (aged 33)

Riders who joined the team for the 2013 season

Rider	2012 team
Rohan Dennis	Team Jayco-AIS
Caleb Fairly	SpiderTech–C10
Lachlan Morton	Chipotle–First Solar Development Team
Nick Nuyens	Saxo Bank–Tinkoff Bank
Steele Von Hoff	Chipotle–First Solar Development Team

Riders who left the team during or after the 2012 season

Rider	2013 team
Murilo Fischer	FDJ
Heinrich Haussler	IAM Cycling
Christophe Le Mével	Cofidis
Thomas Peterson	Argos–Shimano
Sep Vanmarcke	Blanco Pro Cycling

== Season victories ==
Date	Race	Competition	Rider	Country	Location
March 6	Paris–Nice, Stage 3	UCI World Tour	Andrew Talansky (USA)	France	Brioude
March 10	Paris–Nice, Young rider classification	UCI World Tour	Andrew Talansky (USA)	France	
March 21	Volta a Catalunya, Stage 4	UCI World Tour	Dan Martin (IRL)	Spain	Rialp
March 24	Volta a Catalunya, Overall	UCI World Tour	Dan Martin (IRL)	Spain	
March 24	Volta a Catalunya, Teams classification	UCI World Tour	(Note: The riders on the squad were Dan Martin, Koldo Fernández, Ryder Hesjedal, Tom Danielson, Christian Vande Velde, Michel Kreder, David Zabriskie and Peter Stetina)	Spain	
April 21	Liège–Bastogne–Liège	UCI World Tour	Dan Martin (IRL)	Belgium	Liège
April 25	Tour de Romandie, Stage 2	UCI World Tour	Ramūnas Navardauskas (LTU)	Switzerland	Grenchen
May 4	Four Days of Dunkirk, Stage 4	UCI Europe Tour	Michel Kreder (NED)	France	Olhain
May 15	Giro d'Italia, Stage 11	UCI World Tour	Ramūnas Navardauskas (LTU)	Italy	Erto e Casso
May 15	Tour of California, Stage 4	UCI America Tour	Tyler Farrar (USA)	United States	Santa Barbara
May 22	Bayern-Rundfahrt, Stage 1	UCI Europe Tour	Alex Rasmussen (DEN)	Germany	Mühldorf
June 9	Critérium du Dauphiné, Young rider classification	UCI World Tour	Rohan Dennis (AUS)	France	
July 7	Tour de France, Stage 9	UCI World Tour	Dan Martin (IRL)	France	Bagnères-de-Bigorre
August 8	Tour of Utah, Stage 3	UCI America Tour	Lachlan Morton (AUS)	United States	Payson
August 11	Tour of Utah, Overall	UCI America Tour	Tom Danielson (USA)	United States	
August 11	Tour of Utah, Young rider classification	UCI America Tour	Lachlan Morton (AUS)	United States	
August 25	USA Pro Cycling Challenge, Young rider classification	UCI America Tour	Lachlan Morton (AUS)	United States	
September 6	Tour of Alberta, Stage 3	UCI America Tour	Rohan Dennis (AUS)	Canada	Drumheller
September 8	Tour of Alberta, Overall	UCI America Tour	Rohan Dennis (AUS)	Canada	
September 8	Tour of Alberta, Young rider classification	UCI America Tour	Rohan Dennis (AUS)	Canada	
October 5	Tour de l'Eurometropole, Stage 3	UCI Europe Tour	Tyler Farrar (USA)	Belgium	Nieuwpoort
