= 2012 Garmin–Sharp season =

Cycling team season

2012 Garmin–Sharp season
| Manager | Jonathan Vaughters |
| One-day victories | 2 |
| Stage race overall victories | 3 |
| Stage race stage victories | 15 |
Previous season • Next season

The 2012 season for the Garmin–Sharp cycling team began in January at the Tour Down Under. As a UCI ProTeam, they were automatically invited and obligated to send a squad to every event in the UCI World Tour.

Ahead of the season, the team again changed names – for the fifth time in as many years – from Garmin–Cervélo to Garmin-Barracuda, after Barracuda Networks joined the team as its co-sponsor. Despite giving up the team's second name, Cervélo remains with the team as its official bicycle supplier. Before the Tour de France, the team acquired Sharp as a secondary title sponsor, with the team's name becoming Garmin–Sharp for UCI designation, although retaining Barracuda for the team's own publications as Garmin–Sharp–Barracuda.

== 2012 roster ==
Ages as of January 1, 2012.

| Rider | Date of birth |
|---|---|
| Jack Bauer (NZL) | April 7, 1985 (aged 26) |
| Tom Danielson (USA) | March 13, 1978 (aged 33) |
| Thomas Dekker (NED) | September 6, 1984 (aged 27) |
| Tyler Farrar (USA) | June 2, 1984 (aged 27) |
| Koldo Fernández (ESP) | September 13, 1981 (aged 30) |
| Murilo Fischer (BRA) | June 17, 1979 (aged 32) |
| Nathan Haas (AUS) | March 12, 1989 (aged 22) |
| Heinrich Haussler (AUS) | February 25, 1984 (aged 27) |
| Ryder Hesjedal (CAN) | December 9, 1980 (aged 31) |
| Alex Howes (USA) | January 1, 1988 (aged 24) |
| Robert Hunter (RSA) | April 22, 1977 (aged 34) |
| Andreas Klier (GER) | January 15, 1976 (aged 35) |
| Michel Kreder (NED) | August 15, 1987 (aged 24) |
| Raymond Kreder (NED) | November 26, 1989 (aged 22) |
| Christophe Le Mével (FRA) | September 11, 1980 (aged 31) |
| Martijn Maaskant (NED) | July 27, 1983 (aged 28) |

| Rider | Date of birth |
|---|---|
| Dan Martin (IRE) | August 20, 1986 (aged 25) |
| David Millar (GBR) | January 4, 1977 (aged 34) |
| Lachlan Morton (Note: Morton joined the team on August 1, as a stagiaire, from Chipotle-First Solar.) (AUS) | January 2, 1992 (aged 19) |
| Ramūnas Navardauskas (LTU) | January 30, 1988 (aged 23) |
| Thomas Peterson (USA) | December 24, 1986 (aged 25) |
| Alex Rasmussen (Note: Rasmussen was fired by the team on July 4, following his backdated 18-month ban for violating the whereabouts system for anti-doping.) (DEN) | June 9, 1984 (aged 27) |
| Jacob Rathe (USA) | March 13, 1991 (aged 20) |
| Sébastien Rosseler (BEL) | July 15, 1981 (aged 30) |
| Tom Scully (Note: Scully joined the team on August 1, as a stagiaire, from Chipotle-First Solar.) (NZL) | January 14, 1990 (aged 21) |
| Peter Stetina (USA) | August 8, 1987 (aged 24) |
| Andrew Talansky (USA) | November 23, 1988 (aged 23) |
| Christian Vande Velde (USA) | May 22, 1976 (aged 35) |
| Sep Vanmarcke (BEL) | July 27, 1988 (aged 23) |
| Johan Vansummeren (BEL) | February 4, 1981 (aged 30) |
| Steele Von Hoff (Note: Von Hoff joined the team on August 1, as a stagiaire, from Chipotle-First Solar.) (AUS) | December 31, 1987 (aged 24) |
| Fabian Wegmann (GER) | June 20, 1980 (aged 31) |
| David Zabriskie (USA) | January 12, 1979 (aged 32) |

Riders who joined the team for the 2012 season

| Rider | 2011 team |
|---|---|
| Sébastien Rosseler | Team RadioShack |
| Raymond Kreder | Chipotle developmental team |
| Jacob Rathe | Chipotle developmental team |
| Koldo Fernández | Euskaltel–Euskadi |
| Alex Howes | Chipotle developmental team |
| Robert Hunter | Team RadioShack |
| Fabian Wegmann | Leopard Trek |
| Nathan Haas | neo-pro (Genesys Wealth Advisers) |
| Jack Bauer | Endura Racing |
| Thomas Dekker | Chipotle developmental team |
| Alex Rasmussen | HTC–Highroad |

Riders who left the team during or after the 2011 season

| Rider | 2012 team |
|---|---|
| Jack Bobridge | GreenEDGE |
| Travis Meyer | GreenEDGE |
| Cameron Meyer | GreenEDGE |
| Matt Wilson | GreenEDGE |
| Thor Hushovd | BMC Racing Team |
| Brett Lancaster | GreenEDGE |
| Julian Dean | GreenEDGE |
| Gabriel Rasch | FDJ–BigMat |
| Roger Hammond | None |
| Daniel Lloyd | Team IG–Sigma Sport |

== Season victories ==
| Date | Race | Competition | Rider | Country | Location |
|---|---|---|---|---|---|
| February 6 | Tour of Qatar, Stage 2 | UCI Asia Tour | Team time trial (Note: The riders on the squad were Tyler Farrar, Jack Bauer, Thomas Dekker, Murilo Fischer, Robert Hunter, Ramūnas Navardauskas, Jacob Rathe, and Johan Vansummeren) | Qatar | Losail |
| February 10 | Tour of Qatar, Young rider classification | UCI Asia Tour | Ramūnas Navardauskas (LTU) | Qatar | |
| February 10 | Tour Méditerranéen, Stage 2 | UCI Europe Tour | Michel Kreder (NED) | France | Martigues |
| February 11 | Tour Méditerranéen, Stage 3 | UCI Europe Tour | Michel Kreder (NED) | France | La Londe-les-Maures |
| February 12 | Tour Méditerranéen, Young rider classification | UCI Europe Tour | Michel Kreder (NED) | France | |
| February 24 | Tour de Langkawi, Stage 1 | UCI Asia Tour | David Zabriskie (USA) | Malaysia | Putrajaya |
| February 25 | Omloop Het Nieuwsblad | UCI Europe Tour | Sep Vanmarcke (BEL) | Belgium | Ghent |
| March 4 | Driedaagse van West-Vlaanderen, Teams classification | UCI Europe Tour | (Note: The riders on the squad were Tyler Farrar, Jack Bauer, Michel Kreder, Alex Rasmussen, Jacob Rathe and Sébastien Rosseler) | Belgium | |
| March 25 | Volta a Catalunya, Teams classification | UCI World Tour | (Note: The riders on the squad were Dan Martin, Alex Howes, Christian Vande Velde, Ryder Hesjedal, Sébastien Rosseler, Tom Danielson, Thomas Peterson and Peter Stetina) | Spain | |
| April 4 | Circuit de la Sarthe, Stage 2 | UCI Europe Tour | Michel Kreder (NED) | France | Angers |
| April 6 | Circuit de la Sarthe, Stage 5 | UCI Europe Tour | Thomas Dekker (NED) | France | Sablé-sur-Sarthe |
| April 29 | Tour de Romandie, Young rider classification | UCI World Tour | Andrew Talansky (USA) | Switzerland | |
| May 9 | Giro d'Italia, Stage 4 | UCI World Tour | Team time trial (Note: The riders on the squad were Tyler Farrar, Sébastien Rosseler, Jack Bauer, Ramūnas Navardauskas, Ryder Hesjedal, Robert Hunter, Alex Rasmussen, Peter Stetina, and Christian Vande Velde) | Italy | Verona |
| May 17 | Glava Tour of Norway, Stage 2 | UCI Europe Tour | Raymond Kreder (NED) | Norway | Drammen |
| May 17 | Tour of California, Stage 5 | UCI America Tour | David Zabriskie (USA) | United States | Bakersfield |
| May 27 | Giro d'Italia, Overall | UCI World Tour | Ryder Hesjedal (CAN) | Italy | |
| May 27 | Giro d'Italia, Trofeo Super Team | UCI World Tour | | Italy | |
| July 13 | Tour de France, Stage 12 | UCI World Tour | David Millar (GBR) | France | Annonay–Davézieux |
| August 8 | Tour of Utah, Stage 2 | UCI America Tour | Team time trial (Note: The riders on the squad were Tom Danielson, Tyler Farrar, Nathan Haas, Jacob Rathe, Peter Stetina, Christian Vande Velde, David Zabriskie, and Alex Howes) | United States | Tooele |
| August 10 | Tour de l'Ain, Stage 4 | UCI Europe Tour | Andrew Talansky (USA) | France | Septmoncel |
| August 11 | Tour de l'Ain, Overall | UCI Europe Tour | Andrew Talansky (USA) | France | |
| August 11 | Tour de l'Ain, Points classification | UCI Europe Tour | Andrew Talansky (USA) | France | |
| August 20 | USA Pro Cycling Challenge, Stage 1 | UCI America Tour | Tyler Farrar (USA) | United States | Telluride |
| August 22 | USA Pro Cycling Challenge, Stage 3 | UCI America Tour | Tom Danielson (USA) | United States | Aspen |
| August 24 | USA Pro Cycling Challenge, Stage 5 | UCI America Tour | Tyler Farrar (USA) | United States | Colorado Springs |
| August 26 | USA Pro Cycling Challenge, Overall | UCI America Tour | Christian Vande Velde (USA) | United States | |
| August 26 | USA Pro Cycling Challenge, Points classification | UCI America Tour | Tyler Farrar (USA) | United States | |
| September 10 | Zwevegem Koerse | National event | Ramūnas Navardauskas (LTU) | Belgium | Zwevegem |
| October 13 | Tour of Beijing, Mountains classification | UCI World Tour | Daniel Martin (IRL) | China | |
