= 2010 Garmin–Transitions season =

US cycling team season

2010 Garmin–Transitions season
Manager	Jonathan Vaughters
One-day victories	5
Stage race overall victories	3
Stage race stage victories	15
Previous season • Next season

The 2010 season for Garmin–Transitions began in January with the Tour Down Under and ended in October at the Japan Cup. As a UCI ProTour team, they were automatically invited and obliged to attend every event in the ProTour. The team's manager is former cyclist Jonathan Vaughters, who has led the team since its inception in 2003.

The most noteworthy rider movement from 2009 is actually a departure – the team loses Bradley Wiggins, fourth-place finisher in the 2009 Tour de France, to the new Team Sky. Time trial specialist Tom Zirbel was originally signed for the 2010 season, but was subsequently left off the roster due to a mid-November positive test for dehydroepiandrosterone. With the team enforcing a strict zero-tolerance policy on doping positives, Zirbel was dismissed.

== 2010 roster ==
Ages as of January 1, 2010.

Rider	Date of birth
Jack Bobridge (AUS)	July 13, 1989 (aged 20)
Blake Caldwell (USA)	March 27, 1984 (aged 25)
Kirk Carlsen (USA)	May 25, 1987 (aged 22)
Steven Cozza (USA)	March 3, 1985 (aged 24)
Tom Danielson (USA)	March 13, 1978 (aged 31)
Julian Dean (NZL)	January 28, 1975 (aged 34)
Timmy Duggan (USA)	November 14, 1982 (aged 27)
Tyler Farrar (USA)	June 2, 1984 (aged 25)
Murilo Fischer (BRA)	June 17, 1979 (aged 30)
Ryder Hesjedal (CAN)	December 9, 1980 (aged 29)
Robert Hunter (RSA)	April 22, 1977 (aged 32)
Fredrik Kessiakoff (SWE)	May 17, 1980 (aged 29)
Michel Kreder (NED)	August 15, 1987 (aged 22)
Trent Lowe (AUS)	October 8, 1984 (aged 25)

Rider	Date of birth
Martijn Maaskant (NED)	July 27, 1983 (aged 26)
Dan Martin (IRE)	August 20, 1986 (aged 23)
Christian Meier (CAN)	February 21, 1985 (aged 24)
Cameron Meyer (AUS)	January 11, 1988 (aged 21)
Travis Meyer (AUS)	June 8, 1989 (aged 20)
David Millar (GBR)	January 4, 1977 (aged 32)
Thomas Peterson (USA)	December 24, 1986 (aged 23)
Peter Stetina (USA)	August 8, 1987 (aged 22)
Svein Tuft (CAN)	May 9, 1977 (aged 32)
Ricardo van der Velde (NED)	February 19, 1987 (aged 22)
Christian Vande Velde (USA)	May 22, 1976 (aged 33)
Johan Vansummeren (BEL)	February 4, 1981 (aged 28)
Matt Wilson (AUS)	October 1, 1977 (aged 32)
David Zabriskie (USA)	January 12, 1979 (aged 30)

Riders who joined the team for the 2010 season

Rider	2009 team
Jack Bobridge	Team AIS
Kirk Carlsen	Holowesko Partners U23
Murilo Fischer	Liquigas–Doimo
Robert Hunter	Barloworld
Fredrik Kessiakoff	Fuji–Servetto
Michel Kreder	Rabobank continental team
Travis Meyer	neo-pro
Peter Stetina	neo-pro
Johan Vansummeren	Silence–Lotto
Matt Wilson	Team Type 1

Riders who left the team during or after the 2009 season

Rider	2010 team
Hans Dekkers	Landbouwkrediet
Jason Donald	Bahati Foundation Pro Cycling Team
Huub Duyn	Team NetApp
Lucas Euser	SpiderTech–Planet Energy
Michael Friedman	Jelly Belly–Kenda
Will Frischkorn	Retired
Kilian Patour	Retired
Christopher Sutton	Team Sky
Bradley Wiggins	Team Sky

== Stage races ==
The team's first wins of the season came in the Vuelta a Murcia, with sprinter Hunter. He won mass sprint finishes to the first two stages, but abandoned the race before stage 3 to attend the birth of his second child.

== Grand Tours ==
=== Giro d'Italia ===
Garmin-Transitions entered the Giro with a squad led by Farrar and Vandevelde. Vandevelde was often mentioned as an outside contender for overall success in the race. They had a stated goal of trying for stage wins and holding, if not ultimately winning, the pink jersey.

The squad performed well in the Giro's opening stages in the Netherlands. Millar was seventh in the stage 1 time trial, six seconds off the winning pace of Bradley Wiggins. In stage 2, Farrar was one of a great many riders to crash. He fell 55 km (34 mi) from the finish line and appeared to be out of contention for the stage victory, as the peloton rode away from him. Bobridge and Meyer stayed with Farar to pace him back into the leading group, and he made it. Farrar also made a split in the field brought about by a massive crash with 7.2 km (4.5 mi) left to race. Garmin's was the only sprint train left mostly intact by all the crashes, and Dean was Farrar's last leadout man en route to the stage win. The time bonus the win afforded also put Farrar a single second away from the pink jersey for the overall leader, and the team had designs on winning the stage 4 team time trial to put Farrar in the jersey.

However, the team's fortunes were not the same in stage 3 as they had been the day before. Just as he had in stage 3 of the 2009 Giro d'Italia, Vandevelde crashed and retired from the race. Farrar also had a bad day, finishing with the second group on the road and dropping well away from any chance of holding the pink jersey. Millar, however, ended the day in fifth in the overall standings, six seconds behind race leader Alexander Vinokourov, giving the squad a chance to hold the pink jersey after all. If he took the jersey, Millar would become the first British rider ever to be race leader for all three Grand Tours in his career. The squad also wanted to dedicate their prospective victory in the team race to the fallen Vandevelde, but the American's presence proved sorely missed. They managed just eighth on the day, 49 seconds back of stage winners Liquigas–Doimo. Farrar was perhaps the rider most adversely affected by the events of stage 5. While he led the peloton across the finish line at the head of a field sprint, this sprint was only for fourth place, as the peloton had mistimed the catch of a three-man breakaway and lost out on a chance for a stage win themselves.

The squad then lay low until stage 9, another stage that was likely to end in a sprint finish. Farrar made a late split in the field to contest a depleted bunch finish, but no other Garmin riders did. This meant Farrar had to contest the sprint without any sort of leadout, and managed third behind Matthew Goss and Filippo Pozzato. Third, however, was good enough to give Farrar the red jersey as points classification leader. In stage 10, another flat stage, Dean rode a very effective leadout in the stage's final kilometer, splitting the field and giving Farrar the perfect acceleration en route to victory. Farrar was the Giro's only double stage winner. Stage 11 was a major one. Over 50 riders formed a leading group ahead of the race's overall favorites, with the stage winner coming across the finish line nearly 13 minutes ahead of them. While Garmin had Martin and Millar in this group, they were not present to contest the stage win. Farrar finished the stage over 46 minutes behind the stage winner, in a large group with most of the Giro's remaining sprinters. The time gap meant they stood the risk of being disqualified from the Giro. Race officials did not eliminate the group, but instead assessed each of them a 25-point penalty in the points classification. Farrar still led the classification and held the red jersey, but his lead was narrowed considerably, to the point that he was certain he could not win the jersey at the conclusion of the Giro. Farrar, who had plans to ride all three Grand Tours as well as the world championships, left the race two days later, but made a specific point not to do so while he still held the red jersey.

The squad was quiet in the second half of the Giro. Only Dean, Fischer, Martin, and Meyer completed the race. Stage 18 was the only mass sprint finish in the Giro's third week. With the Team HTC–Columbia leadout train working at its best, their leader André Greipel took the victory ahead of Dean in second. In the individual time trial which closed out the Giro, Australian national champion Meyer was eighth. The squad finished last of the 22 teams in the Trofeo Fast Team standings, and tenth in the Trofeo Super Team.

=== Tour de France ===
Garmin-Transitions came to the Tour de France with a versatile squad, led by Farrar aiming for stage wins and possibly the green jersey, while Vandevelde was also present as a General Classification hopeful. Despite not being particularly known as a specialist in the race against the clock, Farrar was seventh-best in the opening prologue time trial. He clocked in 28 seconds off Fabian Cancellara's winning time and better than riders such as Michael Rogers and Bradley Wiggins who are known much more strongly as time trial specialists. The first road race stage the next day was flat and favored a sprinter like Farrar. He was, however, caught up behind the numerous crashes that took place near the finish line and finished near the back of the peloton, in 140th place. He later harshly criticized Ag2r–La Mondiale rider Lloyd Mondory for obstructing him.

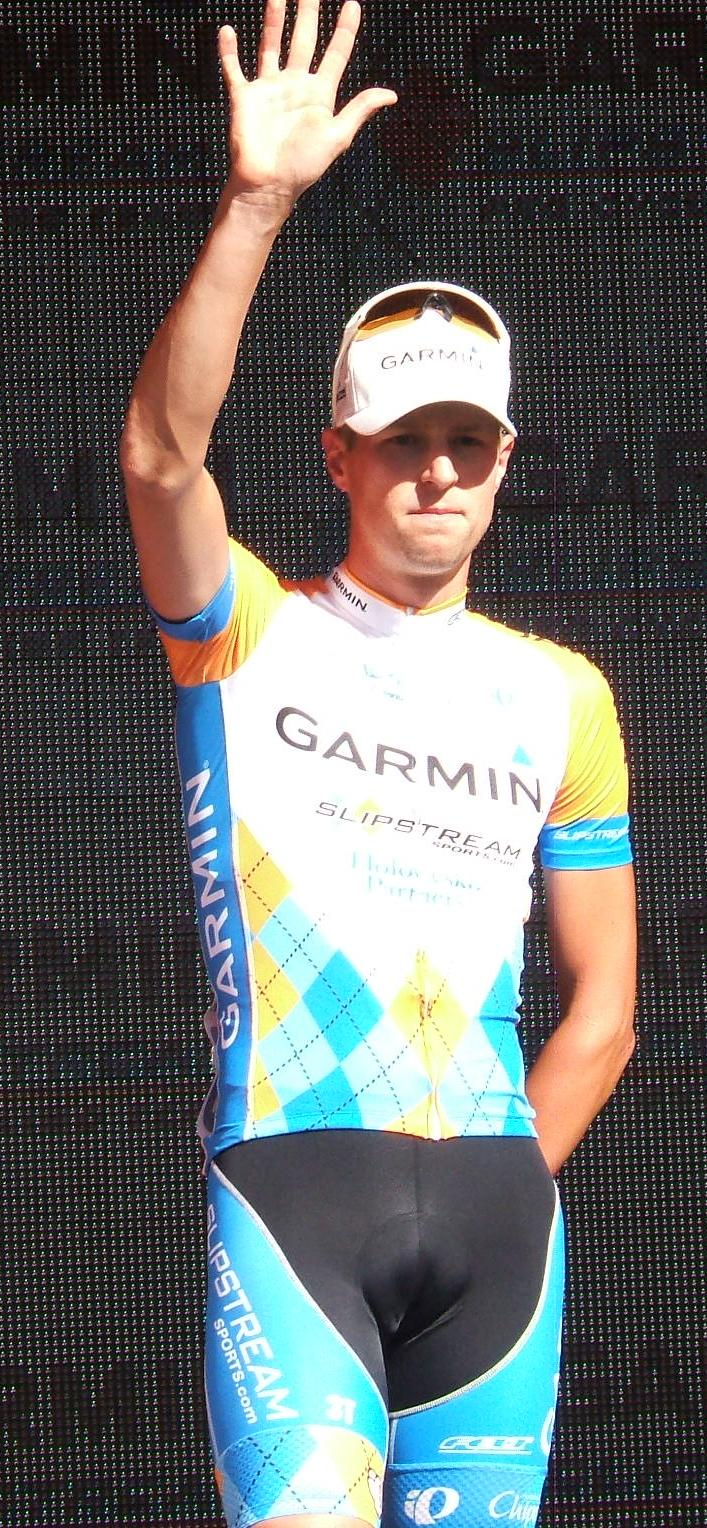
Canadian Ryder Hesjedal finished seventh in the Tour de France – the first time he had finished higher than 45th in a Grand Tour.

The crashes continued in stage 2. A slippery descent of the Col du Stockeu in Spa led to dozens of riders from nearly every team crashing. Garmin-Transitions was perhaps the team most affected – Dean, Farrar, Vandevelde, Hunter, and Millar all crashed, with Millar reportedly crashing three separate times and Vandevelde twice. Dean, Farrar, and Vandevelde were all taken to the hospital for checkups, and Vandevelde was forced to abandon the race after X-rays revealed that he had broken ribs. Dean and Farrar both started the next day, but did so at well below full strength. In stage 3, which was expected to be difficult and crash-ridden since its course included several cobbled sectors. Hesjedal made the day's major breakaway, and rode away from them as the cobbles began. A five-rider chase group, led by Cancellara, caught him in the sectors just before the finish line. He did, however, manage to stay with this group, placing fourth on the day. The result moved him up to fourth overall, and he earned the day's combativity award. The next day's stage was flat, and considered perhaps the easiest stage of this Tour. Dean and Hunter, who were meant to Farrar's leadout men, took second and fifth respectively on the stage. Farrar was 23rd, as he was still feeling the effects of his crash in stage 2 and could not sprint at full strength. Stage 5 was also flat with a sprint finish. Farrar was again distant at the finish, though he improved to tenth. In another flat stage the next day, Farrar's form had improved further as he finished second, just behind Mark Cavendish. Hunter was also among the top riders for this stage, finishing ninth.

The seventh stage was the first in the mountains. While Sylvain Chavanel broke away for the stage win and race leadership, Hesjedal finished the stage near the front of the 40-rider strong group that contained most of the race's overall favorites, and moved up to third overall. He lost a minute and 14 seconds to the race's elite riders the next day, finishing 14th in the first true mountain stage. Hesjedal was in fifth place on the race's first rest day, but he fell even further after stage 9 and the Col de la Madeleine. The Canadian lost three minutes to the majority of the race's top riders, who themselves lost two minutes to Andy Schleck and Alberto Contador, and fell to 12th.

Back to the flats in stage 11, Farrar finished third behind Cavendish and Alessandro Petacchi. The stage was notable for events which took place during that sprint. Farrar's leadout man Dean and Cavendish's leadout man Mark Renshaw clashed for position at the head of the peloton in the stage's final meters. As Dean led Farrar up the middle of the road with Renshaw to his left, the Aussie responded by head-butting him. Renshaw later stated that he was trying to keep Dean from maneuvering him into the roadside barricades, with safety as much a concern as victory, and Dean's line did deviate slightly as he rode. Amid the chaos, the three principal sprinters jumped for an unusually long final kick to the line, starting 400 m (1,300 ft) out. Race officials later expelled Renshaw from the Tour for the headbutting. Dean was not punished for the incident, though the possibility for penalty existed – Cavendish himself was assessed a penalty in the 2009 Tour de France for similar irregular sprinting. The next day, Farrar left the race, revealing that he had sustained a broken wrist when he crashed in Belgium and rode the next nine days in severe pain. Hunter had also abandoned, the day before.

Hesjedal found his form again in stage 15, a difficult mountain stage which crossed the Port de Balès. He was 16th on the stage, four minutes back of the solo winner and one minute back of new race leader Contador, but he gained time against riders like Joaquim Rodríguez, Chris Horner, and Ivan Basso, who had been ahead of him. This result put him back in the top ten overall. He further showed well in the race's queen stage, ending at the Col du Tourmalet. He finished fourth on the day, again ceding time to Contador but gaining time against almost everyone else, moving from tenth to eighth. The team had just one sprinter left of three for the flat stage 18. Cavendish won the stage handily, having a five bike length advantage over Dean in second. In the stage 19 time trial, Zabriskie was fifth. Partially due to a drastic change in wind direction as the day went on, stage winner Cancellara and the second placed Tony Martin had much better times than anyone else. Zabriskie's fifth place was three minutes off Cancellara's time, a gap of unusual size for a time trial among top level professionals. Hesjedal was 52nd on the day, but since Rodríguez was 154th and over ten minutes off Cancellara's time, Hesjedal moved up to seventh. In the Tour's largely ceremonial final stage on the Champs-Élysées, Dean placed third in the field sprint finish. While they made several headlines in the race, the team did not actually win anything and were 16th of 22 teams in the teams classification. Hesjedal's final placing was seventh, ten minutes and 15 seconds off the winning time of Tour champion Contador.

== Season victories ==
Date	Race	Competition	Rider	Country	Location
March 3	Vuelta a Murcia, Stage 1	UCI Europe Tour	Robert Hunter (RSA)	Spain	San Pedro del Pinatar
March 4	Vuelta a Murcia, Stage 2	UCI Europe Tour	Robert Hunter (RSA)	Spain	Caravaca de la Cruz
March 28	Critérium International, Stage 3	UCI Europe Tour	David Millar (GBR)	France	Porto-Vecchio
April 1	Three Days of De Panne, Stage 3A	UCI Europe Tour	Tyler Farrar (USA)	Belgium	De Panne
April 1	Three Days of De Panne, Stage 3B	UCI Europe Tour	David Millar (GBR)	Belgium	De Panne
April 1	Three Days of De Panne, Overall	UCI Europe Tour	David Millar (GBR)	Belgium	
April 7	Scheldeprijs	UCI Europe Tour	Tyler Farrar (USA)	Belgium	Schoten
April 10	Tour of the Basque Country, Sprints classification	UCI ProTour	Christian Meier (CAN)	Spain	
May 9	Giro d'Italia, Stage 2	UCI World Ranking	Tyler Farrar (USA)	Netherlands	Utrecht
May 18	Giro d'Italia, Stage 10	UCI World Ranking	Tyler Farrar (USA)	Italy	Bitonto
May 18	Tour of California, Stage 3	UCI America Tour	David Zabriskie (USA)	United States	Santa Cruz
May 23	Tour of California, Stage 8	UCI America Tour	Ryder Hesjedal (CAN)	United States	Thousand Oaks
May 23	Tour of California, Teams classification	UCI America Tour	(Note: The riders on the squad were Ryder Hesjedal, David Zabriskie, Peter Stetina, Matt Wilson, Thomas Peterson, Steven Cozza, Robert Hunter, and Tom Danielson)	United States	
June 13	Delta Tour Zeeland, Overall	UCI Europe Tour	Tyler Farrar (USA)	Netherlands	
June 13	Delta Tour Zeeland, Points classification	UCI Europe Tour	Tyler Farrar (USA)	Netherlands	
June 13	Delta Tour Zeeland, Teams classification	UCI Europe Tour	(Note: The riders on the squad were Tyler Farrar, Murilo Fischer, Jack Bobridge, Svein Tuft, Travis Meyer, Steven Cozza, Timothy Duggan, and Kirk Carlsen)	Netherlands	
August 5	Tour de Pologne, Stage 5	UCI ProTour	Dan Martin (IRL)	Poland	Ustron
August 7	Tour de Pologne, Overall	UCI ProTour	Dan Martin (IRL)	Poland	
August 7	Tour de Pologne, Teams classification	UCI ProTour	(Note: The riders on the squad were Christian Meier, Thomas Peterson, Dan Martin, Matt Wilson, Murilo Fischer, Cameron Meyer, Peter Stetina, and Thomas Danielson)	Poland	
August 7	Tour of Denmark, Stage 5	UCI Europe Tour	Svein Tuft (CAN)	Denmark	Middelfart
August 15	Vattenfall Cyclassics	UCI ProTour	Tyler Farrar (USA)	Germany	Hamburg
August 17	Tre Valli Varesine	UCI Europe Tour	Dan Martin (IRL)	Italy	Varese
August 17	Eneco Tour, Prologue	UCI ProTour	Svein Tuft (CAN)	Netherlands	Steenwijk
August 22	Eneco Tour, Stage 5	UCI ProTour	Jack Bobridge (AUS)	Netherlands	Sittard
September 1	Vuelta a España, Stage 5	UCI World Ranking	Tyler Farrar (USA)	Spain	Lorca
September 19	Vuelta a España, Stage 21	UCI World Ranking	Tyler Farrar (USA)	Spain	Madrid
October 17	Chrono des Nations	UCI Europe Tour	David Millar (GBR)	France	Les Herbiers
October 24	Japan Cup	UCI Asia Tour	Dan Martin (IRL)	Japan	Utsunomiya
