= 2011 Garmin–Cervélo season =

Cycling team season

2011 Garmin–Cervélo season
Manager	Jonathan Vaughters
One-day victories	7 (Note: Though listed on this article as a victory, no results from the Trofeo Palma de Mallorca are officially counted by the UCI)
Stage race overall victories	1
Stage race stage victories	18
Previous season • Next season

The 2011 season for the Garmin–Cervélo cycling team began in January at the Tour Down Under and ended in October at the Noosa Grand Prix. As a UCI ProTeam, they were automatically invited and obligated to send a squad to every event in the UCI World Tour.

For 2011, the team added Cervélo as a major co-sponsor, after they had, for two seasons, fronted their own professional team, the Cervélo TestTeam. Seven riders from Cervélo TestTeam joined Garmin-Cervélo for 2011, perhaps chief among them reigning world champion Thor Hushovd.

The team took 26 victories in 2011, 25 of which officially count. After having raced the Tour de France for the last three years without any victories, they took four stage wins and the team award at the 2011 Tour. Also a first for the team, they held the yellow jersey for a week with Hushovd. They also placed a rider in the top ten overall – Tom Danielson in ninth. They also took stage wins at both of the season's other Grand Tours, though their Giro d'Italia was marred by the death of Wouter Weylandt, a close friend of Garmin-Cervélo rider Tyler Farrar.

Garmin-Cervélo had wins in each month of the season and with 11 different riders, in addition to a team time trial at the Tour de France. Shortly after the team's lone stage race overall win of the year, the season-opening Tour Down Under, the board of directors fired Matt White, who had been a member of the team's management since 2008, for reasons relating to medical treatment of a former rider.

== 2011 roster ==
Ages as of January 1, 2011.

Rider	Date of birth
Jack Bobridge (AUS)	July 13, 1989 (aged 21)
Tom Danielson (USA)	March 13, 1978 (aged 32)
Julian Dean (NZL)	January 28, 1975 (aged 35)
Tyler Farrar (USA)	June 2, 1984 (aged 26)
Murilo Fischer (BRA)	June 17, 1979 (aged 31)
Roger Hammond (GBR)	January 30, 1974 (aged 36)
Heinrich Haussler (AUS)	February 25, 1984 (aged 26)
Ryder Hesjedal (CAN)	December 9, 1980 (aged 30)
Thor Hushovd (NOR)	January 18, 1978 (aged 32)
Andreas Klier (GER)	January 15, 1976 (aged 34)
Michel Kreder (NED)	August 15, 1987 (aged 23)
Brett Lancaster (AUS)	November 15, 1979 (aged 31)
Christophe Le Mével (FRA)	September 11, 1980 (aged 30)
Daniel Lloyd (GBR)	August 11, 1980 (aged 30)
Martijn Maaskant (NED)	July 27, 1983 (aged 27)

Rider	Date of birth
Dan Martin (IRE)	August 20, 1986 (aged 24)
Cameron Meyer (AUS)	January 11, 1988 (aged 22)
Travis Meyer (AUS)	June 8, 1989 (aged 21)
David Millar (GBR)	January 4, 1977 (aged 33)
Ramūnas Navardauskas (LTU)	January 30, 1988 (aged 22)
Tom Peterson (USA)	December 24, 1986 (aged 24)
Gabriel Rasch (NOR)	April 8, 1976 (aged 34)
Peter Stetina (USA)	August 8, 1987 (aged 23)
Danny Summerhill (Note: Summerhill joined the team on August 1 as a stagiaire.) (USA)	February 13, 1989 (aged 21)
Andrew Talansky (USA)	November 23, 1988 (aged 22)
Christian Vande Velde (USA)	May 22, 1976 (aged 34)
Sep Vanmarcke (BEL)	July 27, 1988 (aged 22)
Johan Vansummeren (BEL)	February 4, 1981 (aged 29)
Matt Wilson (AUS)	October 1, 1977 (aged 33)
David Zabriskie (USA)	January 12, 1979 (aged 31)

Riders who joined the team for the 2011 season

Rider	2010 team
Heinrich Haussler	Cervélo TestTeam
Thor Hushovd	Cervélo TestTeam
Andreas Klier	Cervélo TestTeam
Roger Hammond	Cervélo TestTeam
Brett Lancaster	Cervélo TestTeam
Christophe Le Mével	FDJ
Daniel Lloyd	Cervélo TestTeam
Ramūnas Navardauskas	neo-pro
Gabriel Rasch	Cervélo TestTeam
Andrew Talansky	ex-pro (Amore & Vita–McDonald's, 2009)
Sep Vanmarcke	Topsport Vlaanderen–Mercator

Riders who left the team during or after the 2010 season

Rider	2011 team
Kirk Carlsen	Team Chipotle
Steven Cozza	Team NetApp
Timothy Duggan	Liquigas–Cannondale
Robert Hunter	Team RadioShack
Fredrik Kessiakoff	Astana
Trent Lowe	No professional contract (Note: Lowe, as well as Hunter and Tuft, initially signed with the Australian project known as Pegasus Racing, but that team folded in the offseason after it was unable to secure a UCI license of any kind.)
Christian Meier	UnitedHealthcare
Danny Pate	HTC–Highroad
Svein Tuft	SpiderTech–C10
Ricardo van der Velde	Donckers Koffie-Jelly Belly

== One-day races ==
Before the spring season and the races known as classics, the team was active in the Vuelta a Mallorca series of one-day races. Farrar won the first, the Trofeo Palma de Mallorca, after a field sprint, but this result does not count in the UCI's official records. Beginning with the 2011 season, the UCI has banned race radios from all 1.HC, 2.HC, and below events, having previously banned them at 1.2, 2.2, and national events in 2010 (bans for World Tour races are planned for 2012). The ban is extremely unpopular among teams and riders. Since the Vuelta a Mallorca is a series of 1.1 races, it is covered by the ban. However, prior to the Trofeo Palma de Mallorca, most of the riders in the race signed in wearing radios anyway, in defiance of the ban, and refused to remove them, in protest both of the ban itself and of the UCI making major decisions without the teams' input. Consequently, the UCI's commissaires refused to officiate the race and declared its results moot. The next day, Farrar won the Trofeo Cala Millor without controversy, edging HTC–Highroad's John Degenkolb in a depleted group sprint. The riders did not protest nor strike, deciding against doing so in the best interests of the race organizers after the UCI threatened to cancel the race altogether if they did. The squad was also victorious in the final Vuelta a Mallorca race, the Trofeo Magaluf-Palmanova. Though the course, with five categorized climbs, suggested a breakaway winner, Fischer took the team's ninth victory of the season from a 20-rider sprint finish.

=== Spring classics ===
The team was active at the traditional Belgian opener, Omloop Het Nieuwsblad. Maaskant figured into a 12-man breakaway that formed as the morning's initial break was caught. Sebastian Langeveld and Juan Antonio Flecha went on to decide the race among themselves, with Maaskant finishing seventh 90 seconds back. Farrar just missed out on the podium at Kuurne–Brussels–Kuurne. He took fourth in the field sprint finish.

At the first monument race of the season, Milan–San Remo, the team was thought to be one of the top favorites. They had three potential candidates for victory in Hushovd, Farrar, and Haussler, all of whom had shown good form during the season and Farrar and Haussler had race wins to their credit. They admitted that they each envisioned different scenarios which would lead to their respective potential victories, possibly complicating things for the team, but they remained committed to riding as a team. Each was separately viewed by analysts or fellow riders as a favorite for the day, as well. The race played out differently from these expectations. On the Le Manie climb, 90 kilometers (56 mi) from the finish, Hushovd crashed from roughly the middle of the peloton, leading to the race effectively being split in two. The crash also cost Hushovd one of his wheels. While teammate Vansummeren obligingly offered the world champion one of his, Hushovd stated after the race that the crash ended his chances at victory, since he could not pedal at full strength due to a hip injury. Farrar was also caught behind this split, but Haussler was able to make the selection. He had his choice leadout man Klier with him, but he was unable to make the day's final split on the Poggio, finishing the race in 18th place 27 seconds behind the eight-rider group who contested the win. After the race, team manager Vaughters admitted that the race had not gone to plan, and attributed Haussler not making the selection on the Poggio to a lack of endurance stemming from not having ridden a Grand Tour or any single-day race of this length in nearly two full seasons. Vaughters also stated that this race made for a good example of why it is usually folly to designate a leader in advance of a single-day race, since nearly anything can happen on any given day.

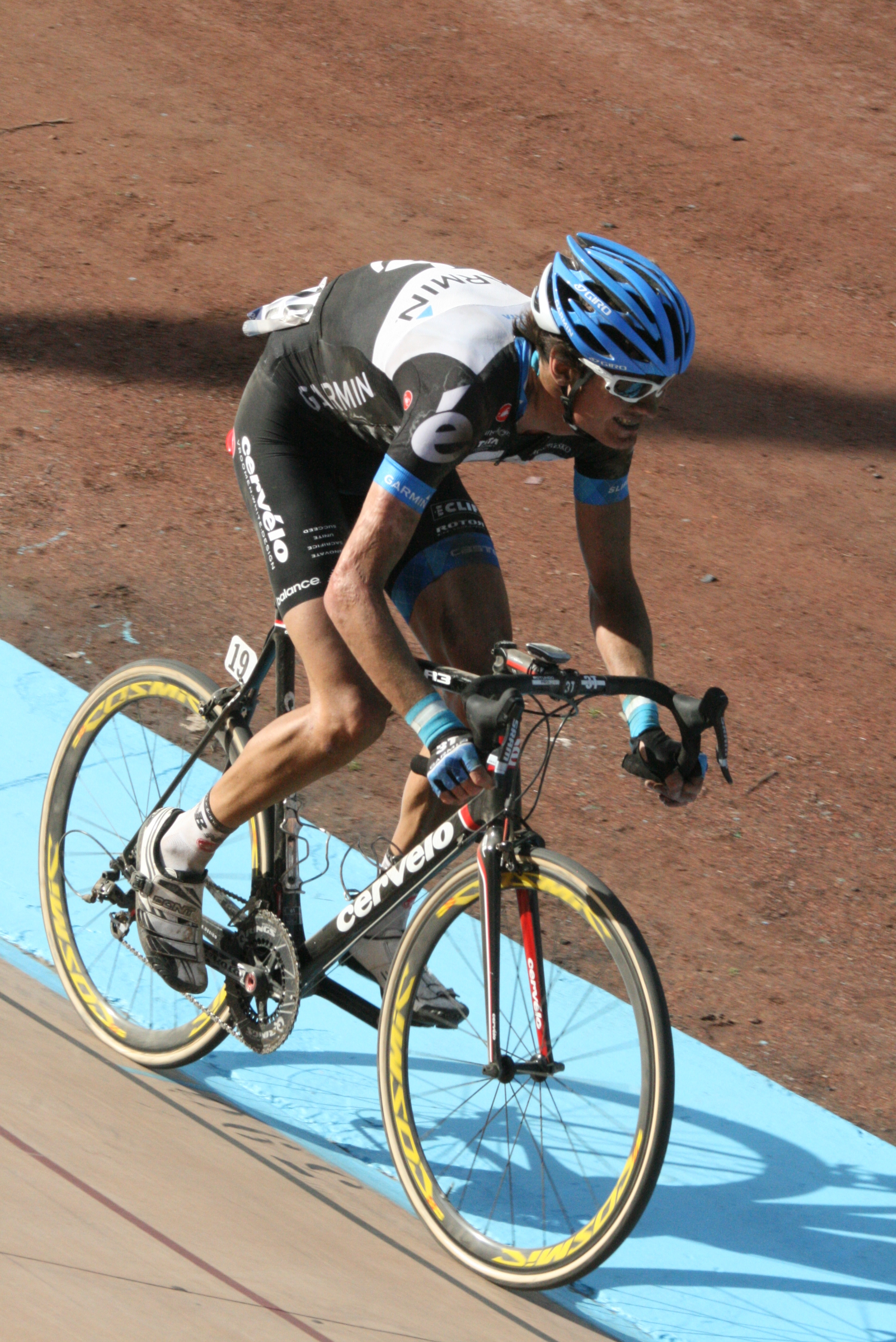
Johan Vansummeren, a classics specialist who has spent nearly all of his career riding as a helper for others, won Paris–Roubaix for just his second pro win.

Farrar, Haussler, and Hushovd drew frequent mention as pre-race favorites and contenders at events like Dwars door Vlaanderen, E3 Prijs Vlaanderen – Harelbeke, and Gent–Wevelgem. While the team had solid high placings at each of these races, they missed out on winning any of them. At Dwars door Vlaanderen, two riders finished ahead of the fast-charging reduced peloton to decide the race themselves. Nick Nuyens and Geraint Thomas had no measurable time gap over the field, but held on for first and second places. Farrar won the sprint from the 30-man peloton, but it was not for the victory, instead merely to round out the podium in third place. Fabian Cancellara took a dominant win at the E3, finishing a minute clear of the next group on the road. Vanmarcke was part of that second group, narrowly missing out in the sprint for the remaining podium places to take fourth overall. Farrar was again third at Gent–Wevelgem, finishing behind Tom Boonen and Daniele Bennati in a hectic reduced sprint. In April, Hesjedal took fourth behind Samuel Sánchez at the GP Miguel Indurain.

Garmin-Cervélo was again touted as a strong team for the season's second monument, the Tour of Flanders, with Hushovd perhaps seen as the strongest of the team's three leaders. Noted in the team's favor was the leadership of sporting director Peter Van Petegem, twice a winner of this race. On race day, Hammond made the day's first major breakaway group, one which stayed away over the first ten cobbled climbs. Hushovd effectively stayed at the front of the race most of the day, even chasing back on to the front after puncturing on the Taaienberg. However, attacks from the likes of Tom Boonen and Fabian Cancellara on the Leberg gapped him off to the point that he never was able to rejoin the front of the race. He finished with the second large group on the road, over four minutes down, in 54th place. Garmin-Cervélo had no riders factor into the race's finale; Farrar fared slightly better than Hushovd, leading the first large group across the finish line, but he was a minute and a half down in 12th place. Haussler was over eight minutes back, having never been a factor in the race. After yet another disappointing showing in a major spring classic, one post-race analysis suggested the team should no longer be considered favorites in single-day races.

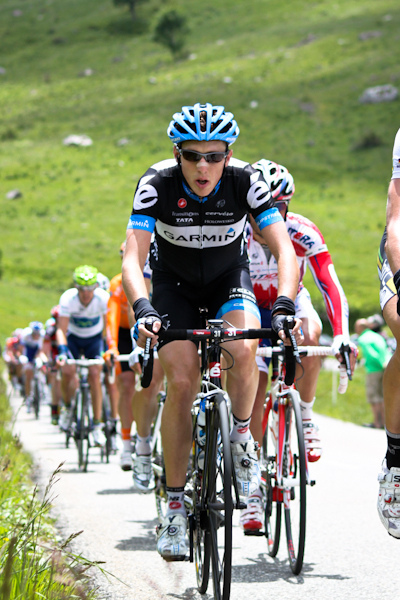
Dan Martin won the Giro della Toscana shortly before the Tour de France, his first win of the season.

Hushovd was again named as a pre-race favorite for the season's third monument, Paris–Roubaix. Farrar and Haussler also rode this race, but they have not had the track record of successes in it that Hushovd has, considering that the Norwegian finished on the podium in both the 2009 and 2010 editions. The race was run aggressively, with nearly 100 kilometers (62 mi) covered, incidentally almost the exact distance to the first cobbled sector, in the first two hours of racing. After a flurry of attacks and counter-attacks on and around the Arenberg Trench, the race's most storied and difficult cobbled sector, 21 riders had opened up a gap of two and a half minutes on the race's main favorites, namely Hushovd and Fabian Cancellara. Garmin-Cervélo had Vansummeren and Rasch in this group. Cancellara tried several times to get clear of the group of favorites, but succeeded only in having Hushovd, BMC Racing Team's Alessandro Ballan, and Juan Antonio Flecha of Team Sky follow his wheel while contributing no work themselves. After a while, Cancellara gave up his efforts, deciding that it was not to his advantage to pull Hushovd, a superior sprinter, to the front of the race. At the Mons-en-Pévèle sector 60 kilometers (37 mi) from the finish, Vanmarcke and Astana's Tomas Vaitkus got clear of the Cancellara group for a time. When they were later brought back, Vanmarcke stayed on the front and did work to help pull the group of favorites nearer to the leaders out front. With 15 kilometers (9.3 mi) remaining, Vansummeren surged clear at the front of the race, and quickly took a time gap. Around that same time, Cancellara put in his most intensive pull. Only Hushovd and Ballan could follow, and the Swiss time trial ace very quickly caught every member of the early breakaway that was still out front, with the exception of Vansummeren. There was simply not enough road left to bring back the Belgian. He entered the Roubaix Velodrome alone and took the biggest win of his career 19 seconds ahead of a rapidly closing Cancellara in second. Hushovd finished eighth, fading slightly towards the finish. Vanmarcke held on for 20th despite taking a strong pull at the front of the favorites group. Only HTC–Highroad also placed three finishers in the top 20. The win was only the second professional race Vansummeren had ever won, after a stage in the 2007 Tour de Pologne. He proposed marriage to his longtime girlfriend after the race – she said yes. Vaughters praised Vansummeren's ride, finding it appropriate with the team's character that a rider who spends almost his entire career in the service of other riders would attain such a prestigious win. He stated that though Cancellara was clearly the strongest rider in the race, Garmin-Cervélo had been the strongest team. He called it his proudest moment as a team boss and said that the result had fulfilled his personal goal of winning one monument race in 2011. Post-race analysis concurred that the result had redeemed the team for their lackluster showings earlier in the spring season.

The next major race in the spring season was the Amstel Gold Race. This race, like the other Ardennes classics to follow, is much more hilly than the cobbled classics, and thus the three leaders from earlier in the season were not part of the team's squad. The team did send the runner-up from the 2010 race, Hesjedal, and he felt himself to be on strong form entering the race. However, the Canadian was quite sick on race day, with stomach issues that caused him to be second from last in this year's edition, over 14 minutes down on the winner. The team's best finisher was Fischer in 28th. Hesjedal had largely recovered for La Flèche Wallonne and Liège–Bastogne–Liège, but he was not a factor in the conclusion to either race, coming 13th in Flèche Wallonne and 29th in Liège. He was the team's best finisher in Liège, but Le Mével did him better in Flèche Wallonne, riding to ninth place to secure 6 UCI rankings points. Martin took his first win of the season at the Giro della Toscana in June. Le Mével had been part of the last breakaway group to be caught before the finale, occupying first position on the road into the final kilometer of the race on the steep Stoppe d'Arca climb. Martin was part of a six-man group that caught and overhauled him, and he won the sprint to deliver for the team.

The team also sent squads to the Clásica de Almería, Montepaschi Strade Bianche, the Scheldeprijs, the Brabantse Pijl, ProRace Berlin, and the Tour de Rijke, but finished no higher than 12th in any of these races.

=== Fall races ===
The team had few noteworthy performances in the later season single-day races. Kreder took tenth in a 25-rider sprint finish to the Coppa Ugo Agostoni in August. He was likewise tenth at Vattenfall Cyclassics, in a 34-rider finale. Hushovd turned in a strong ride at the GP Ouest-France, taking fourth place in an odd finish. Sprinter Grega Bole jumped early for the win, while attackers Simon Gerrans and Thomas Voeckler were caught out between him and the peloton behind for second and third. Hushovd led the peloton across the line for fourth, but all the riders were credited with the same finishing time. Martin took a further two podium placings at Italian races in October. He finished third in the Memorial Marco Pantani, before just missing out on the victory at the fall monument, the Giro di Lombardia. He was the strongest rider in the five-rider chase group that trailed solo winner Oliver Zaugg, and won the sprint to take second overall. Millar rode to fifth place in the Chrono des Nations individual time trial, before Haussler closed out the team's season by winning a national-level event in his native Australia, the Noosa Grand Prix.

The team also sent squads to the Clásica de San Sebastián, Tre Valli Varesine, Druivenkoers Overijse, the Grand Prix Cycliste de Québec, the Grand Prix Cycliste de Montréal, the Giro dell'Emilia, the GP Bruno Beghelli, Paris–Tours, and the Giro del Piemonte, but finished no higher than 11th in any of these races.

== Stage races ==
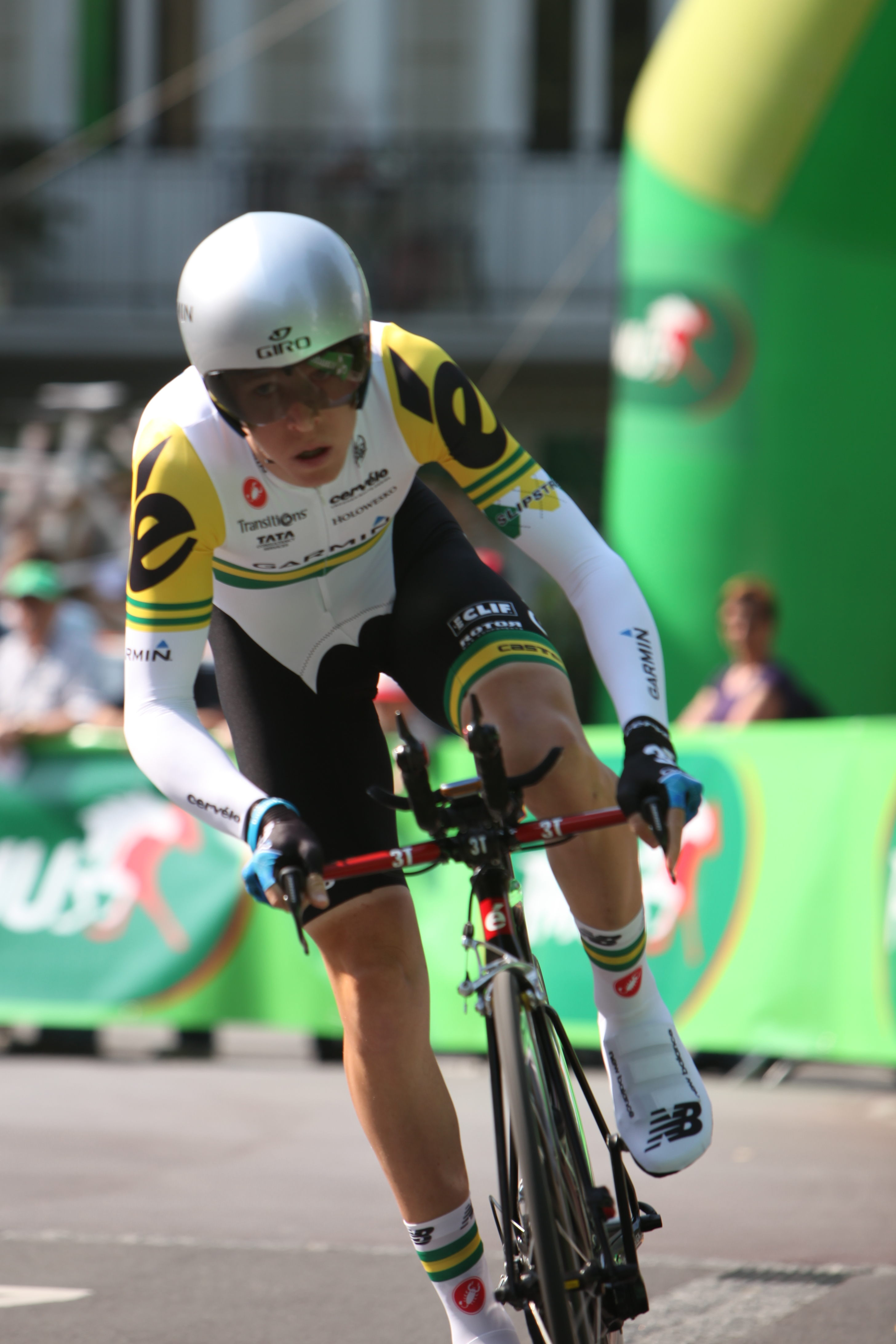
Cameron Meyer, pictured here in his special jersey as Australian national time trial champion, took the overall victory at the Tour Down Under, the first UCI World Tour event of the season.

The team entered the Tour Down Under with a squad led by Farrar, who sought to win the race overall. After failing to figure in the finish to stage 1, Farrar was conclusively ruled out of any overall contention due to a stage 2 crash. At this point, the team specifically turned to Cameron Meyer for their overall chances, and he delivered. In stage 4, Meyer and Wilson both made the day's breakaway, and in a happening rare in the Tour Down Under's history, the breakaway stayed away. Back in the peloton, their teammates rode at the front of the group to try to thwart the plans of Omega Pharma–Lotto, Team Sky, and HTC–Highroad to get another mass finish. Meyer won the stage, with Wilson fading to fourth toward the end. The break's time gap over the main field gave Meyer the overall race leadership. It was the first time in his career that Meyer had ever been a race leader, and with the race's queen stage to Willunga ahead, he was nervous of being able to hold the lead. In the Willunga stage, Meyer finished with the leading group, holding onto his race lead, though it was narrowed to 8 seconds due to fellow stage winner Matthew Goss getting bonus seconds at the finish line for his third place. In the Adelaide criterium to close the race, Meyer preserved his lead, emerging as Tour champion. Goss, however, mounted a spirited challenge, winning bonus time not only at the finish but also in the first intermediate sprint, coming up two seconds short in the final overall standings.

As he had been in his two seasons with Cervélo TestTeam, Haussler was active in the Tour of Qatar in February. After finishing second to Tom Boonen in stage 1, Haussler won stage 2, outkicking Daniele Bennati at the finish, and moved within one second of Boonen in the overall classification. Though he had won the event's points classification in each of the last two years, this was Haussler's first ever stage win at the Tour of Qatar. In stage 3, Boonen flatted at a critical moment when the peloton was at its top speed and lost three minutes, leaving the top of the overall standings wide open. Haussler picked up a second consecutive stage win in Mesaieed, and in so doing he also moved into the overall race leadership. He credited the win to the team treating the third stage like a one-day classic, while also mentioning that HTC–Highroad's Bernhard Eisel performed an effective leadout for all the sprinters at the finish. Haussler lost the overall lead in stage 4, as HTC–Highroad's Mark Renshaw took the stage win and opened a six-second gap with his time bonus at the finish. Haussler was a distant ninth in the event's final stage, meaning the bonus time on offer went wanting and he finished second overall, though winning the points classification for the third year in a row. Similarly continuing Cervélo TestTeam's legacy, the squad won the teams classification as their antecedents also had in each of the previous two editions. Haussler stated that he was pleasantly surprised by his early-season form and hoped it would portend for Milan–San Remo and the Tour of Flanders. At Paris–Nice in March, Haussler won the points classification without winning any stage. He had stage finishes in every position from second through fifth, however. At the concurrent Tirreno–Adriatico, Farrar won the first road race stage after an effective leadout from Hushovd. The next stage was also flat, and Hushovd again performed a leadout that was strong in form, but it was perhaps too strong this time. The world champion opened up a slight gap on Farrar in the final kilometer, and left him to sprint for the line from 600 meters (2,000 ft) out. Farrar lost out at the last moment to Saxo Bank–SunGard's Juan José Haedo.

Martin was the beneficiary at the Volta a Catalunya of an injury sustained by Team RadioShack's Levi Leipheimer. The American had occupied a podium spot, second, before the flat final stage, but a re-occurrence of an abdominal injury left him physically unable to complete the race. Leipheimer's withdrawal moved Martin onto the event's final podium in third. Kreder claimed a surprise win at the Circuit de la Sarthe, pipping race leader Daniele Bennati at the end of stage 2 after the Italian had started his sprint early from an early leadout. Zabriskie won the long time trial at the Tour de Romandie. He bettered all the intermediate time checks of early stage leader Richie Porte, and was two seconds better than the Australian at the finish. While Zabriskie has a reputation as a top time trial specialist, this was the first individual time trial in Europe that he had won since the 2006 Critérium du Dauphiné Libéré, and first victory of any kind since a road race win in the 2010 Tour of California. The team attended the Tour of California with a squad led by two-time runner-up Zabriskie. He effectively lost any chance at winning the race overall in stage 4, when he cracked on the Sierra Road climb and finished 32nd, nearly five minutes down on the day's winner (and eventual Tour winner) Chris Horner. He rebounded two days later to win the Solvang time trial, ahead of three-time winner Levi Leipheimer in a new course-record time. Danielson and Vandevelde had fared somewhat better in the climbing stages and finished the race in third and fourth overall, respectively. Zabriskie's final position was 33rd.

After being shut out for the first few months of the season, world champion Hushovd took his first win in the rainbow jersey at the Tour de Suisse. On a slight uphill finish at Huttwil, Liquigas–Cannondale's Peter Sagan led out from a group about half the size of the full peloton, but Hushovd caught and surpassed him. The two had sprinted so strongly that they opened up a two-second time gap on the rest of the field. Farrar rode well at the partially concurrent Ster ZLM Toer. He took a field sprint win to stage 2, his first victory since the death of his friend Wouter Weylandt in the Giro d'Italia. Adding a third place on stage 5 gave Farrar the win in the race's points classification. The squad also won the team prize, and Navardauskas finished on the event's final podium in third place.

Martin entered the Tour de Pologne as the defending champion. After three stages suited to sprinters, Martin took second behind Peter Sagan on stage 4 at Cieszyn, finishing three seconds back on a final cobbled climb. The result moved him into fourth place overall, seven seconds back. Martin won stage 6, the Tour's queen stage at Bukowina Tatrzańska, taking the race lead in the process. While both Sagan and Martin finished in the peloton on the Tour's final day, Sagan took bonus seconds on course and at the finish, to displace Martin from the top of the standings and emerge as Tour de Pologne champion. Martin finished second overall. Sagan, Martin, and Skil–Shimano's Marcel Kittel were the only riders to win stages in the event. At the Eneco Tour, Millar finished on the final podium. He took third behind Taylor Phinney and Edvald Boasson Hagen, and held third place after every subsequent stage. In September, Hushovd took his last win in the rainbow jersey at the Tour of Britain. On a stage profile typical to those which have favored the veteran sprinter in his later career, Hushovd came first in a reduced uphill group sprint in Caerphilly. Haussler took his third and final win of the season at the inaugural Tour of Beijing, coming first in a full field sprint finish to stage 2, the first road race.

The team also sent squads to the Tour Méditerranéen, the Tour du Haut Var, the Tour of Oman, the Vuelta a Murcia, the Tour of the Basque Country, the Presidential Cycling Tour of Turkey, the Tour de Picardie, Bayern-Rundfahrt, the Critérium du Dauphiné, the Delta Tour Zeeland, the Brixia Tour, the Tour of Denmark, and the Tour of Utah, but did not achieve a stage win, classification win, or podium finish in any of them.

== Grand Tours ==
=== Giro d'Italia ===
Originally, Le Mével and Martin were set to share leadership duties at the Giro d'Italia, though about a week and a half before the race was to begin Martin was pulled due to allergies. Millar, Farrar, Wilson, and Lancaster were named to the squad at that time, with Peterson, Cameron Meyer, Fischer, and Stetina eventually rounding out the squad. The squad held the stage 1 team time trial and subsequently taking the first pink jersey as an immediate goal, having done exactly that in the equivalent stage at the 2008 Giro d'Italia. The team's plan was for Le Mével to ride for the overall, Farrar and Millar for stage wins, and the other riders for support. Stetina made his Grand Tour debut in this race, with his goal simply to finish. The squad finished fifth in the team time trial, coming home with the minimum of five riders together 24 seconds off the winning time set by HTC–Highroad. Farrar was a relatively distant seventh in the group sprint finish to stage 2. He described it as a missed opportunity, with the leadout train faltering at the 600 meters (2,000 ft) to go mark, though he anticipated at least three further sprint opportunities in the Giro.

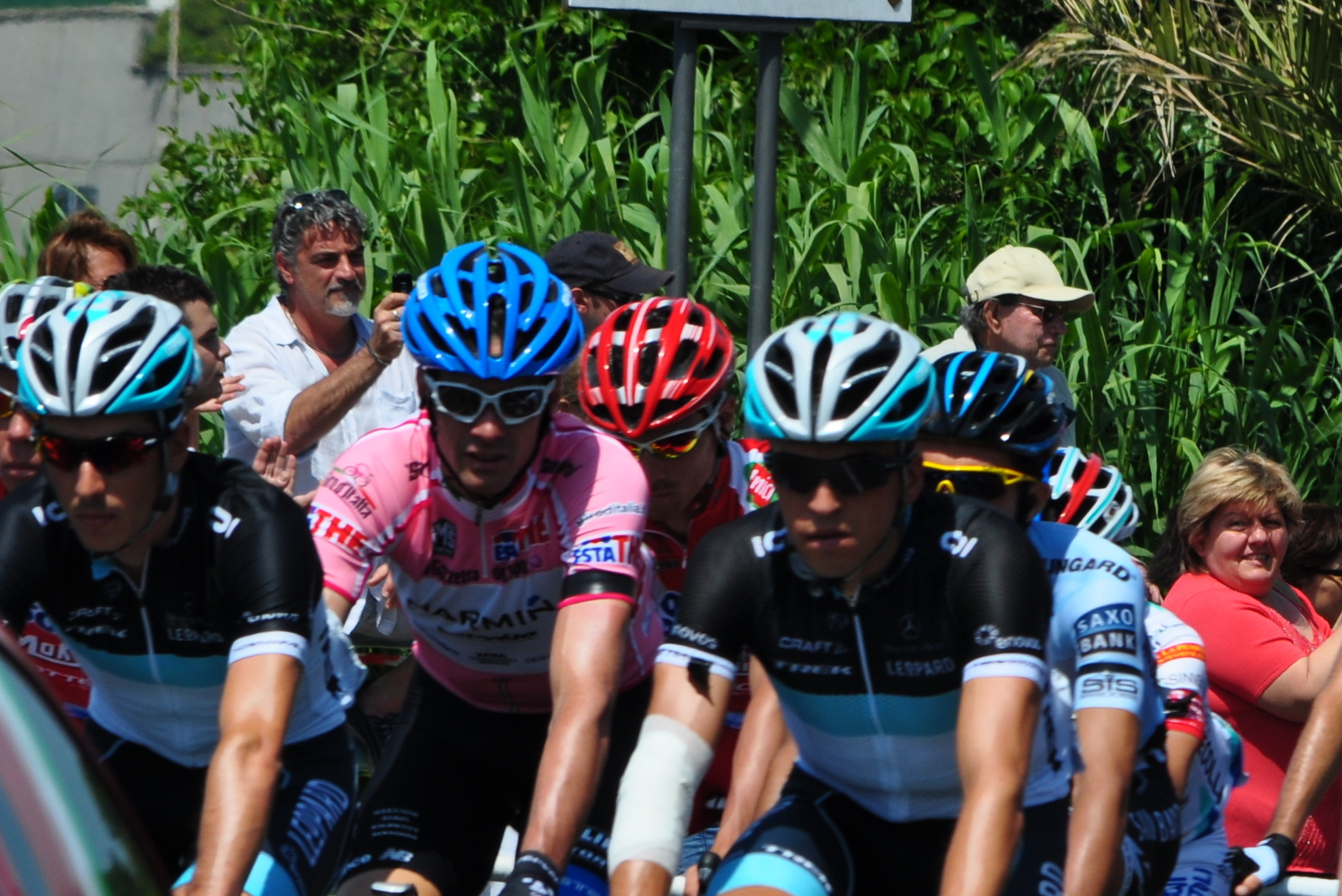
David Millar, race leader at the time, rides alongside Alberto Contador behind the Leopard Trek squad during the neutralized fourth stage.

In stage 3, Millar bridged to a leading quartet in the final 2 kilometers (1.2 mi) of the stage, staying away with them to finish second on the stage and with a sufficient time gap over the peloton that he became the new race leader. This group also included teammate Le Mével, and had he taken any of the time bonuses he and not Millar would have taken the race lead. However, the race and the entire cycling world were turned sideways by the death of Leopard Trek rider Wouter Weylandt after crashing on the descent of the day's last climb, the Passo del Bocco. Other than Weylandt's own team, Garmin-Cervélo was perhaps the team most affected. Millar, in the role of race leader, took up the task of organizing the tributes to Weylandt in the next day's stage. Weylandt's death was especially hard on Farrar, as the two had been close friends and training partners, resulting from Farrar relocating to Weylandt's hometown of Ghent, Belgium when he first became a professional. Farrar said that Weylandt was "like another brother to [him]" and that his death left him "unbearably saddened." The peloton neutralized stage 4, with each team riding on the front for approximately 15 minutes and there being no competitive racing at any time. The final team to take to the front was Weylandt's Leopard Trek squad, who rode side-by-side in the stage's final kilometers. They also invited Farrar up to ride with them, and the nine of them crossed the finish line first together. Millar quietly led the remainder of the peloton across the line a few seconds later. No results for the stage were recorded for any of the race's classifications. Farrar, as well as the remaining Leopard Trek squad, decided to leave the Giro after this neutralized ride. He later revealed that Leopard Trek's decision to include him as they crossed the line was made on the spur of the moment and had not been decided ahead of time.

Millar rode as race leader in stage 5, the first stage competitively raced after Weylandt's death, but he was unable to retain the jersey. He finished two minutes 50 seconds behind the day's winner and new race leader Pieter Weening, as he was unable to stay near the front of the race on the unpaved or 'white' roads that lead into Orvieto. Millar's run in pink had made him the first British rider ever to hold the leader's jersey in all three Grand Tours, though with Weylandt's death he had not really had much of a chance to enjoy it. Le Mével, however, had a good day, finishing eight seconds back of Weening with the group of overall race favorites. He took fourth place on the day, just missing out on the day's time bonuses for the top three – had he taken any of them, he would have become the new race leader instead of Weening. Le Mével then finished highly placed in the next three stages as well, coming in seventh on an uphill sprint to Fiuggi in stage 6, tenth on the Giro's first summit finish at Montevergine di Mercogliano in stage 7, and ninth in the first large group on stage 8. His consistent high finishes had him second in the points classification at that time. While stage winner, new race leader, and eventual Giro champion Alberto Contador took a great deal of time out of the rest of the field on Etna in stage 9, Le Mével's overall position actually improved, from fourth to third.

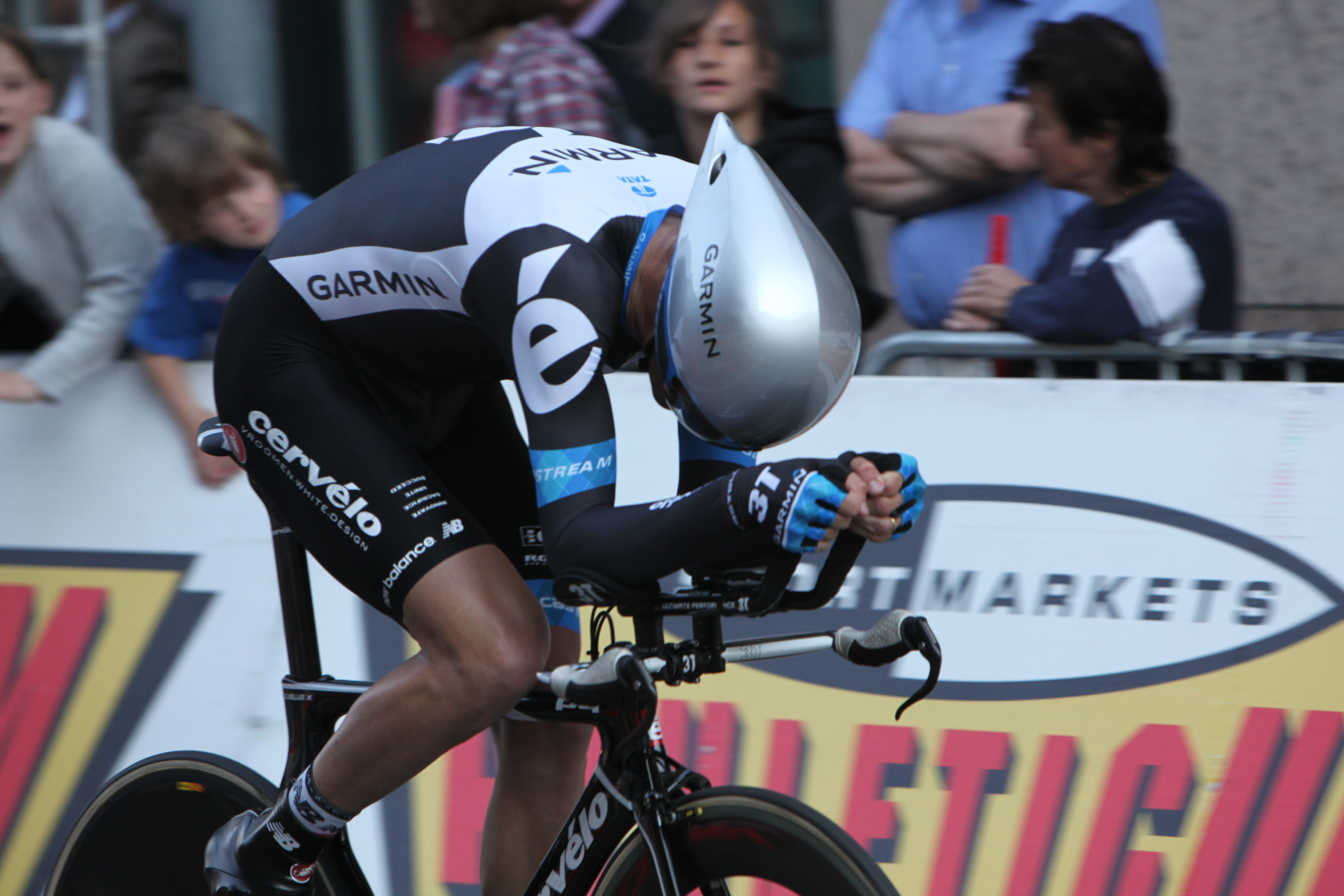
Millar won the stage 21 individual time trial, to earn the distinction of stage wins in all three Grand Tours for his career.

Stage 11 was heavily undulating, to the point where Contador seemed to suggest that he would tactically surrender the pink jersey and not have his team mount an aggressive chase of the day's inevitable breakaway. Le Mével made the breakaway, and being third overall, he was its best-placed rider. He said he went for the break on instinct, and had not planned to escape, since he figured his high GC position would keep him from being allowed up the road. In the peloton, Millar and Fischer both spoke with Contador to ask whether he would be content to allow Le Mével to take the jersey. However, Michele Scarponi's Lampre–ISD team led the chase, hoping to give their captain a win near his home. The breakaway group was caught, and Le Mével faded further toward the finish, losing 13 seconds in a late split in the field. Le Mével said after the stage, "The pink jersey doesn't want me!" and conceded that despite coming close multiple times he would not gain the race lead in this Giro. He hoped to finish the race in the top ten overall. He also revealed that he had spoken to Contador's teammate Richie Porte before the stage, who confirmed to him that their team would not try to retain the jersey.

Seemingly per his expectations, Le Mével lost considerable time on stage 13 on the Grossglockner in Austria. He was 26th on the day, ceding nearly four minutes to Contador and about two and a half minutes to the rest of the race's top riders, falling from fourth to 16th overall. The squad was then quite quiet for the remainder of the Giro. After Farrar's withdrawal, Lancaster, Wilson, and Fischer also left the Giro for health reasons. Le Mével continued to be active, making a winning breakaway in stage 17, but he was the last breakaway rider to finish ahead of the peloton, gaining a mere 23 seconds for his effort and remaining in 16th place. The squad then turned their attentions to the final day individual time trial. Meyer and Millar both targeted it. Millar was among the earliest starters on the day and posted the winning time, with only HTC–Highroad's Alex Rasmussen threatening his position. The victory gave Millar stage wins in all three Grand Tours for his career to go along with his previous distinction of holding the leader's jersey in all three. Le Mével finished the race as the team's top rider, in 15th place.

=== Tour de France ===
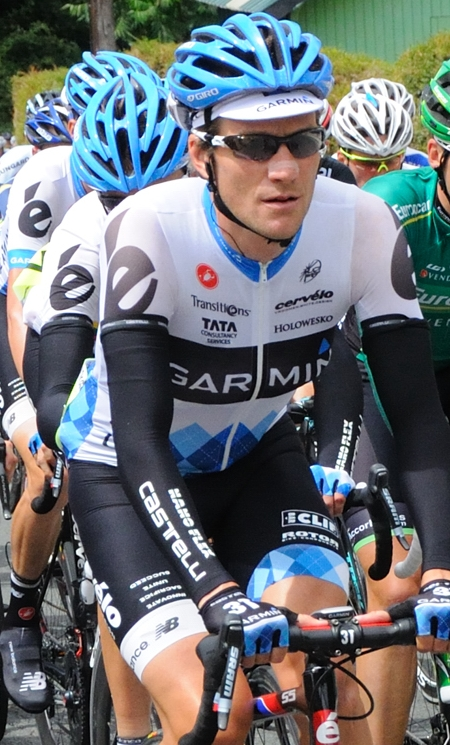
David Zabriskie riding during stage 7, in the team's new jersey for the Tour.

Garmin-Cervélo's squad for the Tour included two riders who had never participated in it before, Navardauskas and Danielson. Vaughters commented that the selection process was not easy, stating that the team had "15 or 18 riders capable of riding the Tour." While Navardauskas was in his neo-pro season in 2011, consequently making this his first Grand Tour, Danielson was a ten-year veteran who had often in his career been tapped as the next great overall classification rider to come out of the United States. He had ridden the Giro d'Italia and the Vuelta a España several times in his career, with three top-ten finishes in the Vuelta, but this marked his first Tour de France. The other riders on the squad were Dean, Farrar, Hesjedal, Hushovd, Millar, Vande Velde, and Zabriskie, with Hesjedal and Vande Velde considered the overall classification hopefuls. The team also revealed a new jersey design for the Tour, predominantly white rather than their predominantly black jersey from earlier in the year, and also reincorporating the argyle pattern that had featured in past year's kits.

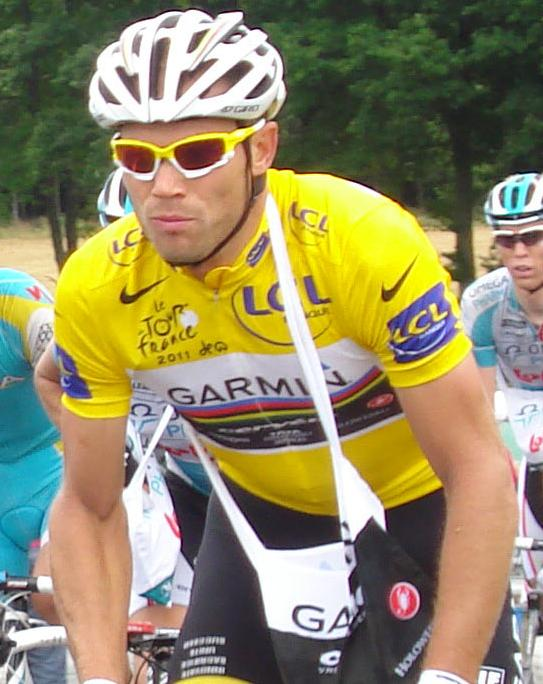
Thor Hushovd took the race lead as a result of the stage 2 team time trial, and he held it for a week. This was the first time one of this team's riders had ever led the Tour.

The Tour's first stage was largely flat, with a short uphill finish. Farrar said the finish was too hard for him and he would work for Hushovd on the stage, as he expected Hushovd to work for him on the more straightforward sprint stages. Hushovd was active in the frenzied finale on the Mont des Alouettes, but finished third six seconds back of Philippe Gilbert. Hesjedal, Vande Velde, and Danielson were all caught behind a crash about 6 kilometers (3.7 mi) from the finish line, and lost a minute and 20 seconds. The win earned Gilbert the yellow, green, and polka-dot jerseys, with the latter two falling to the shoulders of the respective next two men on the day. This had the odd result of the sprinter Hushovd wearing the mountains classification polka-dot jersey during the stage 2 team time trial. Vaughters commented that the squad was ready to "give hell" in the team time trial, ruing the time lost by Hesjedal, Vande Velde, and Danielson but chalking it up to nerves on the first day of a Grand Tour.

Garmin-Cervélo was ninth of 22 teams to take the course, taking the provisional best time by a margin of 12 second over previous leaders Rabobank. Later on, the top favorites for the stage Team Sky, HTC–Highroad, and Team RadioShack took the course and came close to knocking Garmin-Cervélo off, but fell short. When the BMC Racing Team clocked in four seconds off Garmin-Cervélo's time, it effectively sealed the win, as the last team on course, Gilbert's Omega Pharma–Lotto, were not realistic contenders. The stage win installed Hushovd and Millar into the top two places in the overall standings, tied on the same time, with Hushovd taking the yellow jersey on combined stage finishes. The team time trial was Garmin-Cervélo's first Tour stage win, in their fourth Tour. It was the second time Hushovd had been on a squad that won a Tour team time trial, the first having been in the 2001 Tour de France, when Vaughters was one of his teammates. His yellow jersey incorporated his world championship rainbow stripes. Vaughters was understandably thrilled with the victory, and hailed it as a major win for 'clean' cyclists.

Stage 3 the next day was one of those more straightforward flat stages. After the morning's breakaway was caught, some 9 kilometers (5.6 mi) from the finish, Garmin-Cervélo leadout riders hit the front but were quickly displaced by HTC–Highroad working for Mark Cavendish. However, they made errors negotiating a sharp left-hand turn at 750 meters (2,460 ft) to go, and Garmin-Cervélo was able to take first position again. Hushovd led out to 400 meters (1,300 ft) to, giving way to Dean who led out to 150 meters (490 ft), at which point Farrar began his sprint. With Cavendish losing position due to his teammates' flub earlier, Farrar was easily able to make it to the line first, taking his first career Tour stage win. After he crossed the line, Farrar made a W with the thumb and forefinger of both hands, in tribute to Weylandt – and lost his balance, nearly falling off his bicycle as a result. This victory matched him Millar earlier in the season at the Giro d'Italia in taking stage wins at all three Grand Tours for his career. Farrar praised his leadout train, particularly Hushovd. Farrar felt that as race leader and world champion, Hushovd was under no real obligation to ride leadout. Vaughters was pleased with the work turned in by Navardauskas, leading the chase of the breakaway and being part of the leadout.

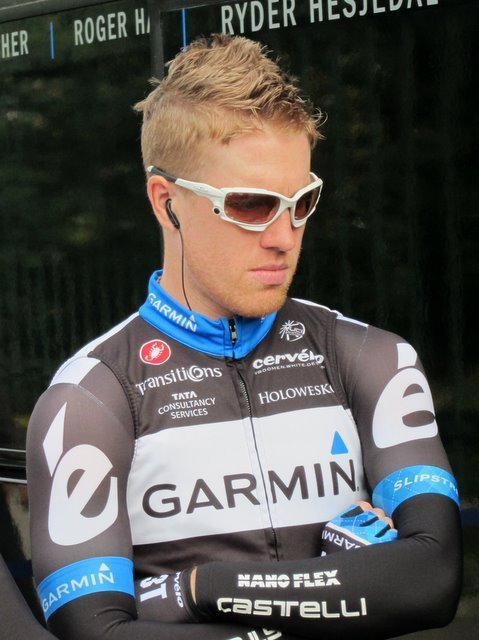
Tyler Farrar, pictured here at Gent–Wevelgem, won stage 3. This was his first Tour de France stage win, to give himself wins in all three Grand Tours for his career.

Hushovd finished safely in the front group on the road in stage 4, a stage with a similar profile to the first in that was largely flat with an uphill finish, on the Mûr-de-Bretagne. This ride retained his race lead. Farrar missed out on the sprint finish to stage 5, being caught up by one of the day's many crashes. Hushovd was able to stay at the front of the race and take tenth in the sprint. Stage 6 had a rolling profile, suitable for classics riders like Hushovd. In a slightly reduced field sprint, that notably lacked Farrar and Cavendish, Hushovd took third behind countryman Edvald Boasson Hagen. Farrar again missed out on the finale to the flat seventh stage, being brought down in a big crash with other riders like Alexander Vinokourov, Levi Leipheimer, and Chris Horner. Hushovd took seventh in the sprint to safely retain the race lead for another day.

Hushovd defied pre-stage expectations in stage 8 at Super Besse. He marked Cadel Evans, who started the day a single second behind him in second place overall, but was unable to follow the Australian's accelerations 1 kilometer (0.62 mi) from the summit at the finish of the stage, as their 22-man group came to the line behind solo stage winner Rui Costa. Hushovd managed to maintain contact with the group for 16th on the day, retaining the yellow jersey again. Hushovd at last lost the yellow jersey in stage 9, when the peloton finished four minutes behind a breakaway that included Thomas Voeckler, who became the new race leader. It was a bad day for the team on another front as well, as Zabriskie was caught in a major crash that forced him, and several other riders, to retire from the race. He was later found to have sustained a broken wrist. Farrar narrowly missed a second stage win in stage 11, when he took third behind Cavendish and André Greipel.

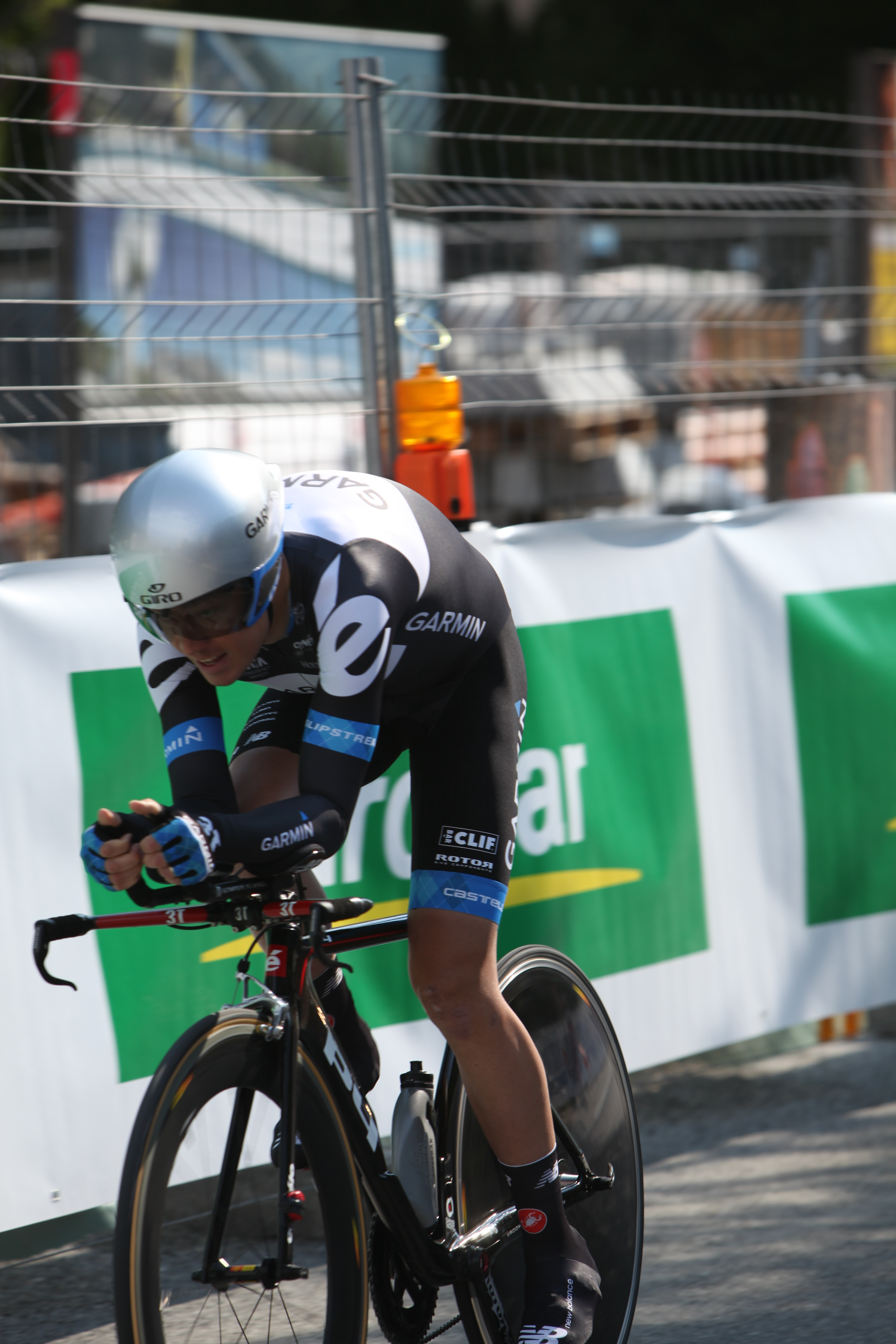
Tom Danielson, pictured here at the Tour de Romandie, rode his first Tour de France in 2011. While he had no one standout performance, he was consistent enough throughout three weeks to finish ninth overall.

In the Tour's first summit finish, at Luz Ardiden in stage 12, Danielson entered the top ten with an 11th place ride on the day. Taking time out of the majority of the field, including some riders who started the day ahead of him, installed Danielson into ninth place overall. Stage 13 was another mountain stage, which incorporated the hors catégorie climb Col d'Aubisque. With the stage's profile suggesting the winner would likely come from the morning breakaway, dozens of riders tried to escape. Ten eventually did, including Hushovd, Jérémy Roy, and David Moncoutié, who were the last three to stay at the front of the race. Roy crested the Aubisque first, with Moncoutié and Hushovd trailing behind. They caught and surpassed him in the brief flat section that followed the climb. Hushovd eventually shod Moncoutié as well and took the stage win solo. Post-race analysis called the stage win a "miracle."

Four days later came stage 16, a medium mountain stage incorporating the second-category Col de Manse. With a stage even more inviting for a breakaway, it took a very long time before one took shape. More than 100 kilometers (62 mi) were covered before Hushovd and Hesjedal, as well as eight others including Roy and Boasson Hagen, broke free. As only 60 kilometers (37 mi) remained when the group broke free, there was no real chase mounted. The race came apart on the Col de Manse, both in the breakaway and back in the peloton. Hushovd, Hesjedal, and Boasson Hagen claimed first position on the road over the remains of the breakaway. With Hesjedal driving them to the line and effectively leading Hushovd out, the world champion claimed his second stage win of the Tour. In the peloton, Danielson lost time to several other riders on the descent, though he remained ninth overall. Thanks to Hesjedal and Hushovd finishing at the front of the race, Garmin-Cervélo took the lead in the teams classification with the day's results as well.

Danielson lost a minute in the overall classification in stage 18, ending at the Col du Galibier, but remained ninth overall, with time gaps above and below him making it unlikely he would gain or lose any positions as the race went forward. He lost more time in the stage 20 individual time trial, but not his overall placement. That position held on the Tour's final stage the next day. Farrar was fourth in the final sprint, behind Cavendish, Boasson Hagen, and Greipel. The squad finished as winners of the teams classification. When going up to the podium to accept the award, the eight remaining riders and Vaughters brought with them a cardboard cutout of Zabriskie, the only team member who had to leave the race. Danielson's ninth-place finish extended the team's streak of placing a rider in the top ten each year they participated in the Tour.

=== Vuelta a España ===
After taking some time to recover from the Giro d'Italia, Le Mével was again the squad leader for the Vuelta a España. Martin, coming off his Giro della Toscana win, was also named as an overall classification rider. The team's sprint hopes were tied to Haussler, riding his first Grand Tour since the 2009 Tour de France. The squad had a notable exclusion in Hushovd. The world champion had already signed to ride for the BMC Racing Team in 2012, but made it clear that he wished to ride the Vuelta as part of his world championships preparation, something he had done in 2010 when he won the championship. Vaughters denied that Hushovd's transfer was the sole reason for his exclusion. He reiterated, as he had before the Tour de France, that the team had numerous riders capable and worthy of riding the Grand Tours. For the Vuelta, Vansummeren and Martin were named to the squad, after both may have seemed good choices but were not selected for the Tour de France squad. Martin drew mention as a pre-race overall contender.

The squad's performance in the stage 1 team time trial was mediocre, as they finished with six riders in ninth place 25 seconds back of the winners Leopard Trek. Farrar took fourth the next day in a slight uphill sprint to Playas de Orihuela. Haussler was unable to finish at the front of the race, coming in a minute back. Martin took his first high placing in stage 4. He led the group of overall contenders home for third place on the day behind solo stage winner Daniel Moreno, on Sierra Nevada. Moreno and Chris Anker Sørensen had broken away 4 kilometers (2.5 mi) from the summit, with the overall contenders essentially content to let them go. The team missed out on the sprint finish to stage 7. Just as Farrar hit the front to begin his sprint, he touched wheels and crashed with Vacansoleil–DCM's Michał Gołaś. The team stuck by him, as all members besides Martin and Le Mével finished at the back of the peloton. Farrar started the next day, but did not complete the stage. Martin took a strong placing on this stage, which ended on a very step climb at San Lorenzo de El Escorial. He finished ninth, 15 seconds back of Joaquim Rodríguez.

Stage 9 had another summit finish, at La Covatilla. Team Katusha, working for race leader Rodríguez, brought back the morning's breakaway with a little under 10 kilometers (6.2 mi) to race. After the first counter-attack was neutralized and brought back, Martin and his cousin Nicolas Roche from Ag2r–La Mondiale were the next ones to ride free of the peloton. Roche could not keep the pace for long, but defending Vuelta champion Vincenzo Nibali and soon-to-be race leader Bauke Mollema made the bridge up to Martin, in turn. Martin proved to be the strongest of them all, claiming his first career Grand Tour stage win. Martin had a poor individual time trial the next day, finishing six minutes slower than stage winner Tony Martin and falling to 24th place. The squad was mostly quiet for the remainder of the race. Martin took a strong fourth place on Peña Cabarga in stage 17, finishing 24 seconds back of the eventual top two men in the Vuelta. This moved him up to 14th overall. Vanmarcke took fourth place in a field sprint in stage 20, one which featured about half the peloton. Martin's final overall placing was 13th. Le Mével, for his part, never featured in the race, finishing 40th overall. Seven Garmin-Cervélo riders completed the race, the exceptions being Farrar and Fischer, the latter of whom left the race before stage 9.

== Season victories ==
Date	Race	Competition	Rider	Country	Location
January 21	Tour Down Under, Stage 4	UCI World Tour	Cameron Meyer (AUS)	Australia	Strathalbyn
January 23	Tour Down Under, Overall	UCI World Tour	Cameron Meyer (AUS)	Australia	
January 23	Tour Down Under, Young rider classification	UCI World Tour	Cameron Meyer (AUS)	Australia	
February 6	Trofeo Palma de Mallorca	UCI Europe Tour	Tyler Farrar (USA)	Spain	Palma
February 7	Trofeo Cala Millor	UCI Europe Tour	Tyler Farrar (USA)	Spain	Cala Millor
February 8	Tour of Qatar, Stage 2	UCI Asia Tour	Heinrich Haussler (AUS)	Qatar	Doha Golf Club
February 9	Tour of Qatar, Stage 3	UCI Asia Tour	Heinrich Haussler (AUS)	Qatar	Mesaieed
February 10	Trofeo Magaluf-Palmanova	UCI Europe Tour	Murilo Fischer (BRA)	Spain	Palma Nova
February 11	Tour of Qatar, Points classification	UCI Asia Tour	Heinrich Haussler (AUS)	Qatar	
February 11	Tour of Qatar, Teams classification	UCI Asia Tour	(Note: The riders on the squad were Heinrich Haussler, Jack Bobridge, Roger Hammond, Andreas Klier, Daniel Lloyd, Travis Meyer, Gabriel Rasch, and Johan Vansummeren)	Qatar	
February 20	Volta ao Algarve, Points classification	UCI Europe Tour	Tyler Farrar (USA)	Portugal	
March 10	Tirreno–Adriatico, Stage 2	UCI World Tour	Tyler Farrar (USA)	Italy	Arezzo
March 13	Paris–Nice, Points classification	UCI World Tour	Heinrich Haussler (AUS)	France	
April 6	Circuit de la Sarthe, Stage 2	UCI Europe Tour	Michel Kreder (NED)	France	Angers
April 8	Circuit de la Sarthe, Teams classification	UCI Europe Tour	(Note: The riders on the squad were Daniel Lloyd, Michel Kreder, Ramūnas Navardauskas, Peter Stetina, David Zabriskie, and David Millar)	France	
April 10	Paris–Roubaix	UCI World Tour	Johan Vansummeren (BEL)	France	Roubaix
April 30	Tour de Romandie, Stage 4	UCI World Tour	David Zabriskie (USA)	Switzerland	Bougy-Villars
May 1	Tour de Romandie, Young rider classification	UCI World Tour	Andrew Talansky (USA)	Switzerland	
May 1	Tour de Romandie, Teams classification	UCI World Tour	(Note: The riders on the squad were David Millar, Jack Bobridge, David Zabriskie, Andrew Talansky, Peter Stetina, Matthew Wilson, Tom Danielson, and Cameron Meyer)	Switzerland	
May 20	Tour of California, Stage 6	UCI America Tour	David Zabriskie (USA)	United States	Solvang
May 22	Tour of California, Teams classification	UCI America Tour	(Note: The riders on the squad were David Zabriskie, Tom Danielson, Ryder Hesjedal, Thor Hushovd, Dan Martin, Andrew Talansky, Johan Vansummeren, and Christian Vande Velde)	United States	
May 29	Giro d'Italia, Stage 21	UCI World Tour	David Millar (GBR)	Italy	Milan
June 14	Tour de Suisse, Stage 4	UCI World Tour	Thor Hushovd (NOR)	Switzerland	Huttwil
June 16	Ster ZLM Toer, Stage 2	UCI Europe Tour	Tyler Farrar (USA)	Netherlands	Sittard-Geleen
June 19	Giro della Toscana	UCI Europe Tour	Dan Martin (IRE)	Italy	Arezzo
June 19	Ster ZLM Toer, Points classification	UCI Europe Tour	Tyler Farrar (USA)	Netherlands	
June 19	Ster ZLM Toer, Teams classification	UCI Europe Tour	(Note: The riders on the squad were Julian Dean, Tyler Farrar, Andreas Klier, Michel Kreder, Brett Lancaster, Martijn Maaskant, Ramūnas Navardauskas, and Johan Vansummeren)	Netherlands	
July 3	Tour de France, Stage 2	UCI World Tour	Team time trial (Note: The riders on the squad were Thor Hushovd, Tom Danielson, Julian Dean, Tyler Farrar, Ryder Hesjedal, David Millar, Ramūnas Navardauskas, Christian Vande Velde, and David Zabriskie)	France	Les Essarts
July 4	Tour de France, Stage 3	UCI World Tour	Tyler Farrar (USA)	France	Redon
July 15	Tour de France, Stage 13	UCI World Tour	Thor Hushovd (NOR)	France	Lourdes
July 19	Tour de France, Stage 16	UCI World Tour	Thor Hushovd (NOR)	France	Gap
July 24	Tour de France, Teams classification	UCI World Tour		France	
August 5	Tour de Pologne, Stage 6	UCI World Tour	Dan Martin (IRE)	Poland	Bukowina Tatrzańska
August 28	USA Pro Cycling Challenge, Teams classification	UCI America Tour	(Note: The riders on the squad were Tom Danielson, Ryder Hesjedal, Daniel Lloyd, Thomas Peterson, Peter Stetina, Christian Vande Velde, David Zabriskie, and Daniel Summerhill)	United States	
August 28	Vuelta a España, Stage 9	UCI World Tour	Dan Martin (IRE)	Spain	Sierra de Béjar – La Covatilla
September 14	Tour of Britain, Stage 4	UCI Europe Tour	Thor Hushovd (NOR)	Great Britain	Caerphilly
September 18	Duo Normand	UCI Europe Tour	Thomas Dekker (NED); Johan Vansummeren (BEL)	France	Normandy
October 6	Tour of Beijing, Stage 2	UCI World Tour	Heinrich Haussler (AUS)	China	Mentougou
October 29	Noosa Grand Prix	National event	Heinrich Haussler (AUS)	Australia	Noosa

== Away from competition ==
=== Dismissal of Matt White ===
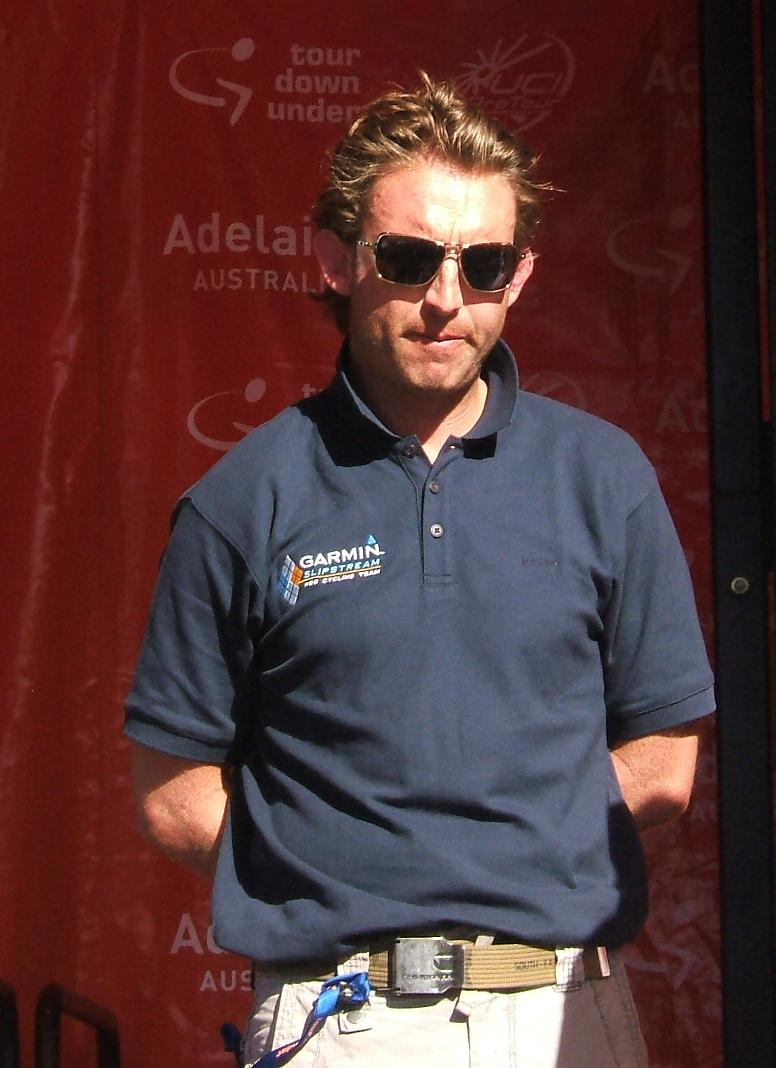
Matt White had been a member of the team's management since 2008, but he was abruptly sacked after the Tour Down Under.

On January 24, the day after the Tour Down Under ended, Garmin–Cervélo dismissed Matt White, an Australian former cyclist who had been a sporting director for them since 2008. White was the team's director at the Tour Down Under. This was announced one week after the long-rumored formation of a new top-level Australian team, known under the name GreenEDGE, was confirmed for 2012. White, as well as riders Cameron Meyer and Jack Bobridge, had been speculated to be bound for the new team, since the contracts of all three expire at the end of 2011.

Vaughters denied that this link was the case, and the team's official announcement gave a different reason for White's firing. Officially, White was released for referring former team rider Trent Lowe to a Spanish doctor named Luis Garcia del Moral, who has been implicated in several doping cases. This referral took place in April 2009. Garcia del Moral had been the team doctor for the U.S. Postal Service team for the first five of Lance Armstrong's consecutive Tour de France victories, a period during which Floyd Landis claims he witnessed and participated in organized doping with the team, and was otherwise involved in some suspect activities during that time. However, Garcia del Moral's checkered past may not have figured into White's firing – the team stated that White had violated an important internal rule simply by sending Lowe to a doctor outside the team's employ or without approval of the medical staff.

Complicating the story were reports that Lowe had blackmailed the team's management with publicly revealing the fact that he had been sent to see Garcia del Moral, demanding the unpaid portion from his 2010 contract (which was withheld due to Lowe riding with the equipment for his presumed 2011 team, Pegasus, while still under contract to Garmin). Lowe's lawyer later refuted the blackmail claims, but Lowe bringing up the matter is the reason, per Vaughters, why White was fired for an incident which took place nearly two years prior.

The firing was done by mandate of the Slipstream Sports board of directors, which consists of Vaughters, team owner Doug Ellis, and team president Matt Johnson. Vaughters flew to Adelaide to personally dismiss White after he had not been present at the Tour Down Under. He also informed the Tour Down Under squad, while the team's other riders were informed via a conference call to the team's training camp in Girona. Riders reacted with shock, since White had been an integral part in the team rising from a US-based team with limited presence in Europe to be one of the biggest in the world.

White, for his part, took the decision stride, saying that, with Cervélo as a new corporate sponsor and several new riders on the team from the defunct Cervélo TestTeam, the team's focus and direction for 2011 was different from in prior years. White felt his energies could be better spent elsewhere. White had the week prior been appointed as Cycling Australia's professional men's road coordinator. Cycling Australia conducted their own investigation into the reasons behind White's firing, and kept him on in the position.

White's immediate successor was Vaughters himself. Shortly afterward, the team hired Peter Van Petegem as classics advisor, with a short-term contract running from the beginning of March until Paris–Roubaix on April 10. The timing of the contract was to avoid an appearance of impropriety due to Van Petegem's role with the organizers of Omloop Het Nieuwsblad and his own full-time job as an insurance broker. Van Petegem had, in his cycling career, won both Paris–Roubaix and the Tour of Flanders. He also served as a consultant with the Astana team in 2010 helping Alberto Contador learn to ride the cobbles that figured into stage 4 of the 2010 Tour de France. This relationship had proved fruitful as Contador gained time on most of his rivals in that cobbled stage en route to winning the Tour de France; analysis had credited Van Petegem for Contador's success. With Van Petegem in the team car, Garmin-Cervélo won Paris–Roubaix with Johan Vansummeren. A week after Paris–Roubaix, the team hired Eric Van Lancker to a position somewhat in between White's and Van Petegem's in that he was not a short-term hire, but he was also not thought to be White's permanent replacement.
