= Wesley Kreder =

Dutch road racing cyclist

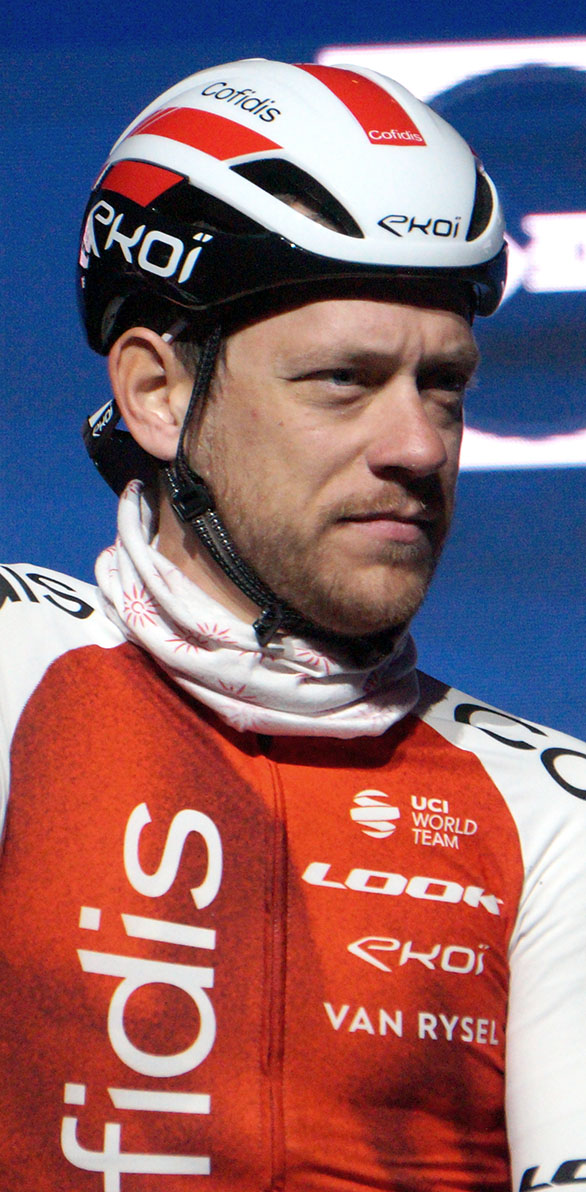
- Kreder in 2023

Personal information
- Full name: Wesley Kreder
- Born: 4 November 1990 (age 35) Leiden, Netherlands
- Height: 1.83 m (6 ft 0 in)
- Weight: 70 kg (154 lb; 11 st 0 lb)

Cycling career
- Sport: Cycling
- Current team: Retired
- Disciplines: Road; Track
- Role: Rider

Amateur teams
- 2008: DGR Cycling Team
- 2009: Van Vliet–EBH Elshof
- 2010–2012: Rabobank Continental Team
- 2012: Vacansoleil–DCM (stagiaire)

Professional teams
- 2013: Vacansoleil–DCM
- 2014: Wanty–Groupe Gobert
- 2015–2016: Team Roompot
- 2017–2020: Wanty–Groupe Gobert
- 2021: Intermarché–Wanty–Gobert Matériaux
- 2022–2023: Cofidis

Major wins
- Tour de Vendée (2012)

Wesley Kreder (born 4 November 1990) is a Dutch former road racing cyclist, who competed as a professional from 2013 to 2023.

== Career ==
Born in Leiden, Kreder has competed as a professional since the middle of the 2012 season, joining the Vacansoleil–DCM team as a stagiaire, having been a member of the Rabobank Continental Team from 2010 onwards. Kreder achieved his first professional victory in October 2012, making a late-race attack at the Tour de Vendée, and held off the field by two seconds. Kreder remained with the team full-time into the 2013 season.

Kreder joined Wanty–Groupe Gobert for the 2014 season, after his previous team – Vacansoleil–DCM – folded at the end of the 2013 season. In September 2014 it was announced that Wesley, Michel and Raymond Kreder would sign with the new Team Roompot squad for 2015.

== Personal life ==
Wesley's brother Dennis, and cousins Michel and Raymond are all professional cyclists; Dennis was a team-mate of Wesley's at Van Vliet–EBH Elshof in 2009, while Michel and Raymond were team-mates at Roompot–Oranje Peloton in 2015 and 2016.

== Major results ==
2007
3rd Points race, National Track Championships
2008
1st Overall Acht van Bladel
1st stage 3 Le Trophee Centre Morbihan
3rd Overall Ronde des Vallées

1st Stage 1b

7th Ledegem-Kemmel-Ledegem
2009
10th Arno Wallaard Memorial
2010
1st Ronde van Midden-Nederland
2nd Eschborn-Frankfurt City Loop U23
3rd Kernen Omloop Echt-Susteren
4th ZLM Tour
5th Izegem Koers
9th Memorial Fred De Bruyne
10th Arno Wallaard Memorial
2011
1st Stage 2b (TTT) Vuelta Ciclista a León
3rd Road race, National Under-23 Road Championships
3rd Overall Tour de Normandie
3rd Omloop der Kempen
4th Eschborn-Frankfurt City Loop U23
5th Grand Prix des Marbriers
6th Paris–Tours Espoirs
7th Overall Kreiz Breizh Elites
9th Ster van Zwolle
10th Ronde van Noord-Holland
2012
1st Tour de Vendée
2nd Zellik–Galmaarden
3rd Ster van Zwolle
4th Dorpenomloop Rucphen
7th Ronde van Noord-Holland
8th Overall Ronde van Overijssel
2013
4th Ronde van Drenthe
5th Kampioenschap van Vlaanderen
10th Nationale Sluitingsprijs
2014
3rd Road race, National Road Championships
3rd Classic Loire Atlantique
8th Overall World Ports Classic
2015
9th Dwars door Drenthe
2016
1st Stage 2 Ster ZLM Toer
2017
5th Omloop Mandel-Leie-Schelde
2018
4th Antwerp Port Epic
5th Ronde van Drenthe
8th Dwars door het Hageland

=== Grand Tour general classification results timeline ===
| Grand Tour | 2021 | 2022 |
|---|---|---|
| Giro d'Italia | 128 | 139 |
| Tour de France | — | — |
| Vuelta a España | 110 | — |

Legend
| — | Did not compete |
| IP | In progress |
| DNF | Did not finish |
