= Elizabeth Seliga =

American cycling team manager

Elizabeth Seliga (born 1973, Ohio, United States) is an American cycling team manager known for her work in athlete development and junior cycling programs.

== Career ==
=== Cycling ===
Seliga co-founded Slipstream Sports LLC in 2003 alongside Jonathan Vaughters and Doug Ellis.

She served in multiple operational roles during the team’s early development, including finance, logistics, and media production. Vaughters described her as a central figure in the organization’s early success. Seliga also contributed to the development of the team’s visual identity, including early design concepts associated with the program. Professional rider David Millar credited Seliga and the team’s support staff with establishing the team’s operational foundation. Slipstream Sports competed in major international races including the Tour de France and Giro d’Italia and evolved into a major WorldTour team. .

Seliga later founded 3 Cats Racing, a youth cycling program based in Virginia.

=== Photography and storytelling ===
Seliga began her career as a sports photographer covering cycling events internationally. Her work has been credited in Sports Illustrated, USA Today, The Financial Times and Pro Cycling magazine, among others. She has received recognition in international photography competitions and was named to the Senior Style Guide “Hot 100 ICON Status".

Seliga’s work includes visual storytelling and writing related to cycling and youth development.

== Personal life ==
Seliga is based in Central Virginia and is a level 3 NICA coach with the Charlottesville Racing Club Junior Mountain Bike Team.
