= Chipotle–First Solar Development Team =

Team information
- UCI code: CDT
- Registered: United States
- Founded: 2006
- Disbanded: 2012
- Discipline: Road
- Status: UCI Continental
- Bicycles: Cervélo

Key personnel
- General manager: Chann McRae
- Team managers: Corey Hart; Nico Mattan; Elizabeth Seliga

Team name history
- 2006–2007 2008 2009 2010 2011 2012: VMG Racing; VMG–Felt; Team Felt–Holowesko Partners; Team Holowesko Partners; Chipotle Development Team; Chipotle–First Solar Development Team

Chipotle–First Solar Development Team was an American UCI Continental cycling team that existed from 2006 to 2012. The team served as a feeder team for Garmin–Sharp. Many notable cyclists such as Steele Von Hoff, Andrei Krasilnikau, Robbie Squire and Lachlan Morton rode for the team.

== History ==
=== Origins and lineage ===
From its early years as the TIAA-CREF program, the Slipstream Sports organization emphasized developing young riders as part of a long-term goal of reaching the UCI ProTour level by 2009, prioritizing talent development over acquiring established professional.

Riders such as Ian MacGregor were part of earlier TIAA-CREF and Slipstream structures, illustrating continuity within the program’s development pathway.

In 2007, Slipstream advanced its senior team to the UCI Professional Continental level as Team Slipstream presented by Chipotle, marking a shift toward top-tier international competition.At that time, team management emphasized that the professional squad would “race to win, not learn,” reinforcing the separation between the elite team and its affiliated development programs.

=== Continental team era ===
By 2011, the team had achieved UCI Continental status, allowing it to compete internationally.

The team was managed by former professional cyclist Chann McRae, who described it as Garmin’s “feeder” squad.It operated within the Slipstream Sports system led by Jonathan Vaughters. Additional staff included sports directors Nico Mattan and Corey Hart, as well as assistant sports director Elizabeth Seliga.

The team competed internationally across multiple UCI Continental circuits, achieving notable results including stage victories and strong general classification finishes in races such as the Tour de Langkawi and La Tropicale Amissa Bongo. In 2012, the team was ranked among the top 60 cycling teams globally.

=== Rider development and progression ===
The team served as a direct pathway to the professional ranks, with multiple riders progressing to Slipstream’s WorldTour squad, then competing as Garmin-Sharp (currently EF Education–EasyPost). Riders including Alex Howes, Lachlan Morton, Jacob Rathe and Raymond Kreder advanced from the development team to the professional level.

Other riders associated with the program included Peter Stetina and Daniel Summerhill, reflecting the team’s role within both international road racing and the broader U.S. cycling development landscape.

=== Disbandment ===
At the end of the 2012 season, title sponsor Chipotle Mexican Grill elected not to renew its sponsorship as part of a broader reduction in sports marketing activities. The loss of primary sponsorship led to the dissolution of the team following the 2012 season.
