= Velothon Berlin =

German one-day road cycling race

Race details
- Date: May
- Region: Berlin, Germany
- Discipline: Road race
- Competition: UCI Europe Tour
- Type: Single-day
- Organiser: Lagardère Unlimited
- Race director: Erik Zabel
- Web site: www.garmin-velothon-berlin.de

History
- First edition: 2011
- Editions: 5
- Final edition: 2015
- First winner: Marcel Kittel (GER)
- Most wins: Marcel Kittel (GER) (2 wins)
- Final winner: Ramon Sinkeldam (NED)

Velothon Berlin (officially Garmin Velothon Berlin, formerly ProRace Berlin) was a single-day road bicycle race held annually in May, between 2011 and 2015, in Berlin, Germany. It was part of the UCI Europe Tour as a 1.1 race. It was part of the UCI Velothon Majors series of races organised by Lagardère Unlimited, which also included Velothon Wales, Velothon Stockholm and Velothon Vienna. These events were characterised by mass-participation sportives before an elite race along a lengthened route.

== Winners ==
Year	Country	Rider	Team
2011	Germany	Marcel Kittel	Skil–Shimano
2012	Germany	André Greipel	Lotto–Belisol
2013	Germany	Marcel Kittel	Argos–Shimano
2014	Netherlands	Raymond Kreder	Garmin–Sharp
2015	Netherlands	Ramon Sinkeldam	Team Giant–Alpecin
