= Ricardo van der Velde =

Dutch cyclist

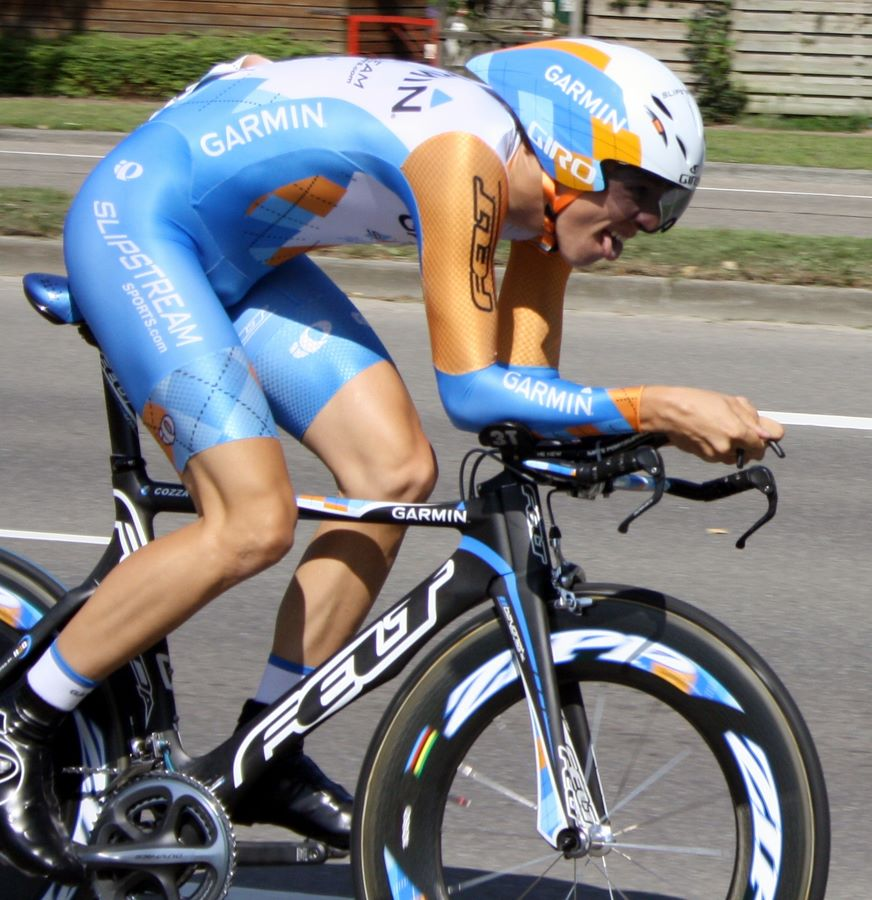
- Van der Velde at the 2009 Eneco Tour

Personal information
- Full name: Ricardo van der Velde
- Born: 19 February 1987 (age 39) Rijsbergen, Netherlands

Cycling career
- Sport: Cycling
- Current team: Retired
- Discipline: Road
- Role: Rider

Professional teams
- 2006–2008: Rabobank Continental Team
- 2009–2010: Garmin–Slipstream
- 2011: Donckers Koffie–Jelly Belly
- 2012–2013: Jelly Belly Cycling Team

Ricardo van der Velde (born 19 February 1987 in Rijsbergen) is a Dutch former racing cyclist.

== Major results ==
2008
1st Stage 4 Tour de l'Avenir
2009
1st Stage 1 (TTT) Tour of Qatar
2011
3rd International Cycling Classic
