= Raymond Kreder =

Dutch professional road cyclist

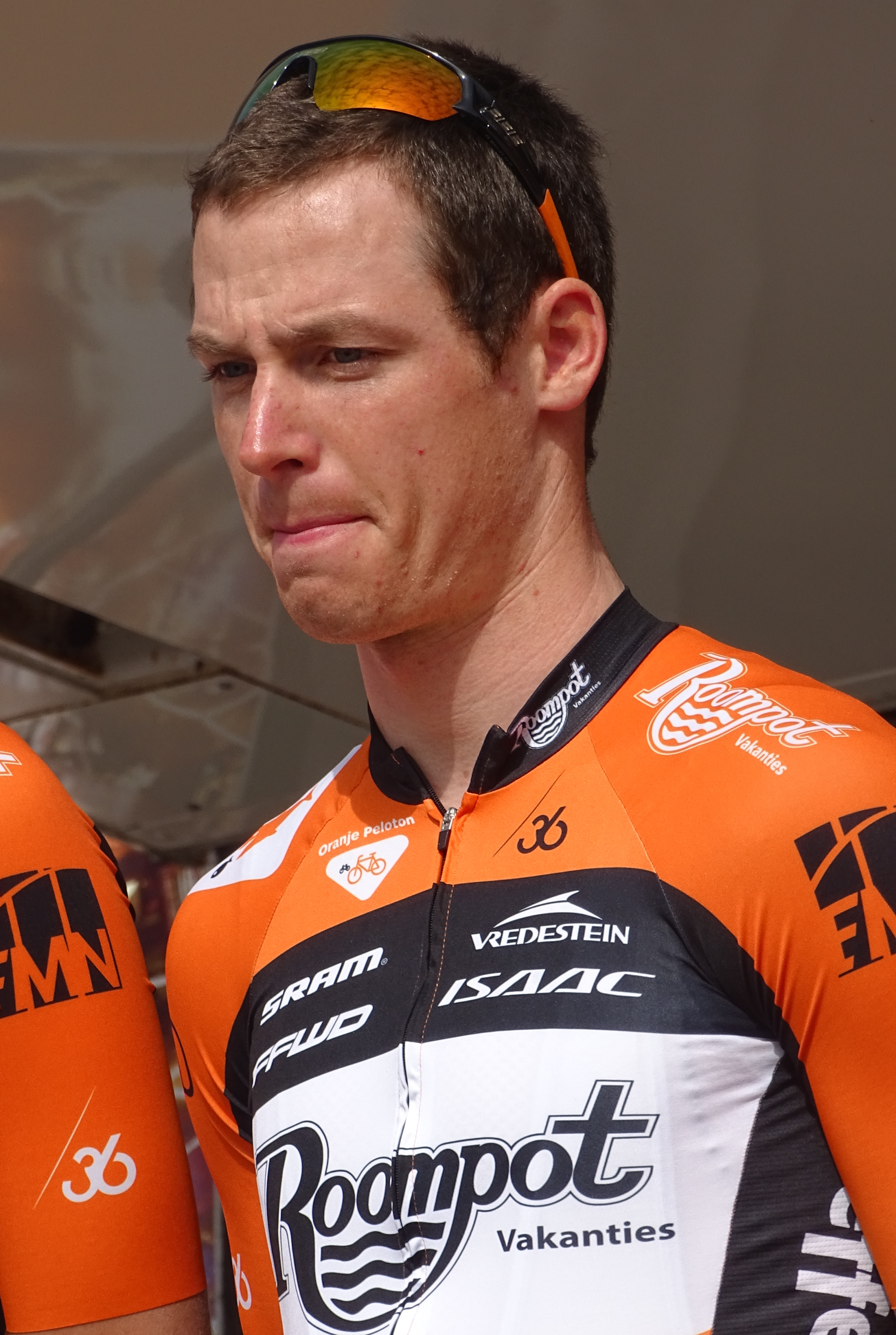
- Kreder at the 2015 Grand Prix de Denain.

Personal information
- Full name: Raymond Kreder
- Nickname: Rayray
- Born: 26 November 1989 (age 36) The Hague, Netherlands
- Height: 1.77 m (5 ft 9 1/2 in)
- Weight: 70 kg (154 lb)

Cycling career
- Sport: Cycling
- Current team: Kinan Racing Team
- Disciplines: Road; Track
- Role: Rider
- Rider type: All-rounder

Amateur teams
- 2006: DCM Vorselaar
- 2009–2011: Felt–Holowesko Partners
- 2010: Garmin–Transitions (stagiaire)

Professional teams
- 2012–2014: Garmin–Barracuda
- 2015–2017: Team Roompot
- 2018–2023: Team UKYO
- 2024–: Kinan Racing Team

Raymond Kreder (born 26 November 1989) is a Dutch professional road racing cyclist, who currently rides for UCI Continental team Kinan Racing Team.

Kreder's older brother Michel Kreder and their cousin Wesley Kreder have also competed professionally as cyclists. Kreder was born, raised, and resides in The Hague, South Holland, Netherlands.

== Major results ==
2006
1st Paris–Roubaix Juniors
2008
2nd Scratch race, National Track Championships
2009
1st Points classification, Cascade Cycling Classic
1st Mountains classification, Tour de Beauce
8th Overall Olympia's Tour
2010
1st Points race, National Track Championships
1st Stage 3 Cascade Cycling Classic
7th Ronde Van Vlaanderen Beloften
7th Binche–Tournai–Binche
10th Paris–Roubaix Espoirs
2011
7th Ronde van Midden-Nederland
2012
National Track Championships

1st Madison (with Michel Kreder)
2nd Points race

1st Stage 2 Tour of Norway
3rd ProRace Berlin
2013
6th ProRace Berlin
7th RideLondon–Surrey Classic
2014
1st ProRace Berlin
1st Stage 1 Tour de l'Ain
10th Vattenfall Cyclassics
2015
4th Grand Prix de Denain
4th Omloop van het Houtland
6th Trofeo Playa de Palma
6th Trofeo Santanyi-Ses Salines-Campos
8th Grand Prix Impanis-Van Petegem
9th Kuurne–Brussels–Kuurne
2016
3rd Kampioenschap van Vlaanderen
4th Ronde van Drenthe
6th Clásica de Almería
2017
3rd Dorpenomloop Rucphen
5th Trofeo Porreres-Felanitx-Ses Salines-Campos
5th Trofeo Playa de Palma
9th Clásica de Almería
2018
1st Points classification, Tour of Hainan
1st Stage 1 Tour of Thailand
2nd Overall Tour de Tochigi

1st Points classification
1st Stage 3

5th Overall Tour de Korea

1st Points classification
1st Stage 5

2019
1st Overall Tour de Tochigi

1st Points classification
1st Stage 3

1st Stage 4 Tour of Japan
1st Stage 3 Tour de Hokkaido
3rd Overall Tour de Korea

1st Stage 1

2022
1st Stage 4 Tour of Japan
5th Overall Tour de Taiwan

1st Stage 4

3rd Overall Tour of Thailand
