= Alex Howes =

American road cyclist

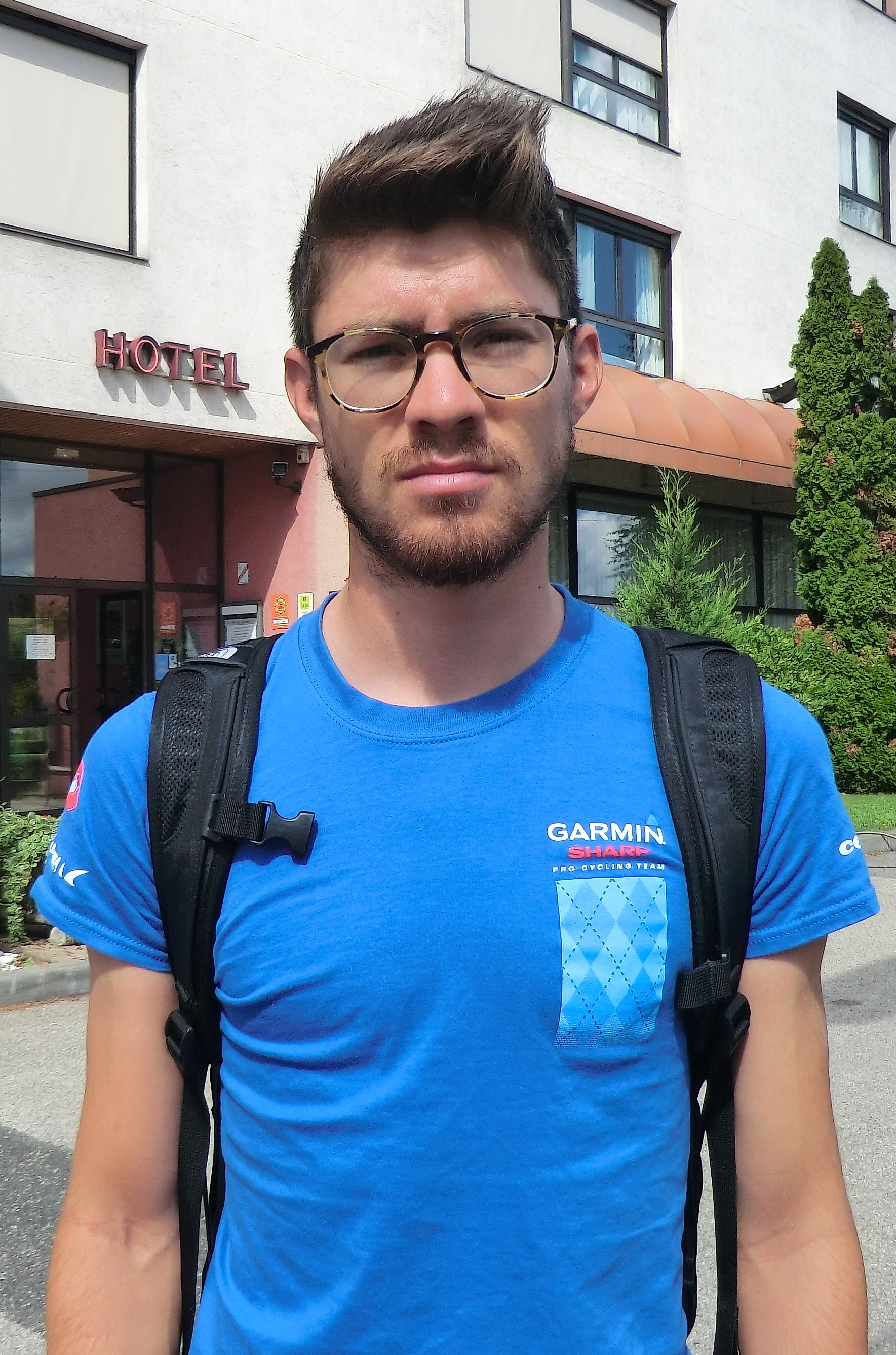
- Howes at the 2013 Tour de l'Ain

Personal information
- Born: January 1, 1988 (age 38) Denver, Colorado, United States
- Height: 5 ft 9 in (175 cm)
- Weight: 144 lb (65 kg)

Cycling career
- Sport: Cycling
- Current team: Retired
- Discipline: Road
- Role: Rider
- Rider type: Climber

Amateur teams
- 2003–2006: 5280–Subaru
- 2008: Vélo-Club La Pomme Marseille
- 2008–2011: VMG Felt U23
- 2009: Garmin–Slipstream (stagiaire)

Professional teams
- 2007: Slipstream–Chipotle
- 2012–2022: Garmin–Barracuda

Major wins
- One-day races and Classics National Road Race Championships (2019)

Alex Howes (born January 1, 1988) is an American former professional road racing cyclist, who competed as a professional in 2007 and from 2012 to 2022, spending his entire career with Garmin–Barracuda. Howes turned professional on a full-time basis in 2012. In 2023 he became a cycling coach at Team EF Coaching and a gravel racer.

== Personal life ==
Howes was born on January 1, 1988, in Denver, Colorado and raised in Golden, Colorado, United States. He resided in Boulder, Colorado and Girona, Catalonia, Spain. In 2023 he lived in Nederland, Colorado. Howes attended the University of Colorado, Boulder.

== Cycling career ==
Howes rode with Slipstream–Chipotle, a UCI Professional Continental team, and Vélo-Club La Pomme Marseille, an amateur team, in 2008.

=== Garmin–Barracuda (2012–2022) ===
Howes signed with Garmin–Barracuda, a UCI ProTeam, for the 2012 and 2013 seasons. He remained with the team for the 2014 season. Howes won stage seven of the 2014 USA Pro Cycling Challenge; his first professional victory.

Howes re-signed with Cannondale–Garmin for the 2015, 2016, and 2017 seasons. He was named in the start list for the 2017 Giro d'Italia.

== Major results ==
2009
National Under-23 Road Championships

1st Criterium
1st Road race

4th Overall Tour of Utah

1st Young rider classification
1st Mountains classification
1st Stage 4

5th Mount Evans Hill Climb
2010
2nd Road race, National Under-23 Road Championships
7th Tour of the Battenkill
2011
4th Overall Tour of the Gila
4th Overall Tour de Beauce
2012
1st Stage 2 (TTT) Tour of Utah
6th Brabantse Pijl
2014
1st Stage 7 USA Pro Cycling Challenge
3rd Road race, National Road Championships
2015
4th Road race, National Road Championships
2016
2nd Road race, National Road Championships
9th Overall Tour of Alberta
2017
1st Mountains classification, Tour of the Basque Country
Cascade Cycling Classic

1st Stages 1 & 5

3rd Overall Colorado Classic

1st Stage 2

3rd Overall Tour of Alberta

1st Stage 3

2019
1st Road race, National Road Championships
1st Stage 1 (TTT) Tour Colombia
3rd Dirty Kanza 200
3rd Crusher in the Tushar
5th Leadville Trail 100 MTB
2021
1st SBT GRVL

=== Grand Tour general classification results timeline ===
Grand Tour	2013	2014	2015	2016	2017
Giro d'Italia	—	—	—	—	136
Tour de France	—	127	—	131	—
Vuelta a España	93	—	129	—	—

Legend
—	Did not compete
DNF	Did not finish
