= Michel Kreder =

Dutch road cyclist

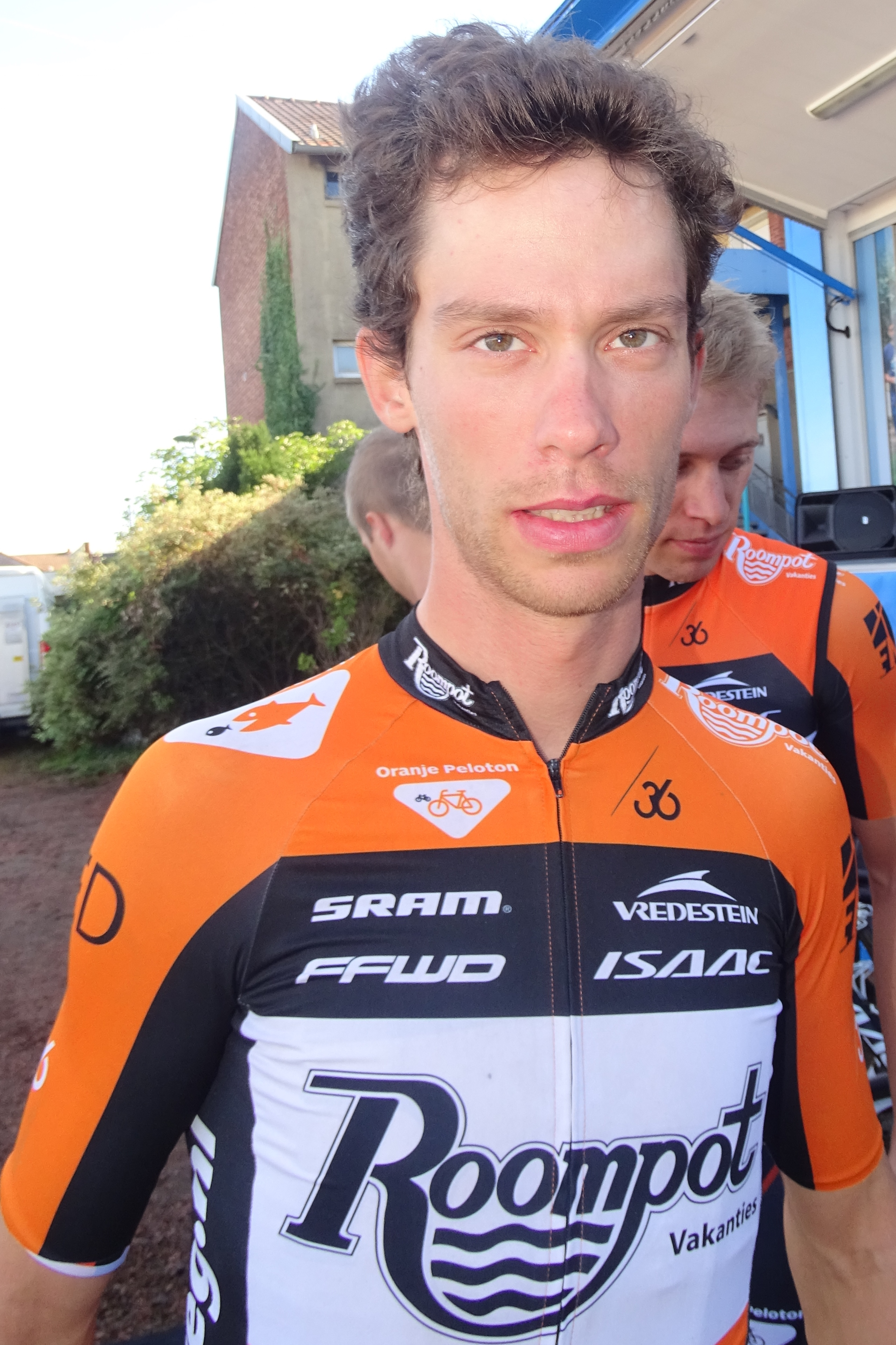
- Kreder in 2015.

Personal information
- Full name: Michel Kreder
- Born: 15 August 1987 (age 39) The Hague, Netherlands
- Height: 1.78 m (5 ft 10 in)
- Weight: 67 kg (148 lb)

Cycling career
- Sport: Cycling
- Current team: Retired
- Disciplines: Road; Track
- Role: Rider
- Rider type: All-rounder

Amateur team
- 2006–2007: Unibet–Davo

Professional teams
- 2008–2009: Rabobank Continental Team
- 2010–2013: Garmin–Transitions
- 2014: Wanty–Groupe Gobert
- 2015–2016: Team Roompot
- 2017–2018: Aqua Blue Sport
- 2019: Ningxia Sports Lottery–Livall Cycling Team

Michel Kreder (born 15 August 1987) is a Dutch former professional road racing cyclist, who rode professionally between 2008 and 2019.

== Career ==
Following a four-year stint with Garmin–Sharp, Kreder signed with Wanty–Groupe Gobert for the 2014 and 2015 seasons. However, in September 2014 it was announced that Michel, Raymond and Wesley Kreder would all sign for the new Team Roompot for 2015. In October 2016 Aqua Blue Sport announced that Kreder would be part of their inaugural squad for the 2017 season.

== Personal life ==
Kreder was born, raised, and resides in The Hague, South Holland, Netherlands. He comes from a family of professional cyclists; his cousin Wesley Kreder and his younger brother Raymond Kreder also competed professionally.

== Major results ==
2004
3rd Road race, National Junior Road Championships
2007
1st Stage 4 Thüringen Rundfahrt der U23
5th Overall Tour des Pyrénées
2008
1st Stage 1 Tour Alsace
5th Overall Grand Prix Guillaume Tell
6th De Vlaamse Pijl
8th Overall Olympia's Tour
9th Overall Circuito Montañés

1st Stage 3

2009
2nd Overall Istrian Spring Trophy
4th Grand Prix de la Ville de Lillers
4th Rund um Düren
5th Overall Tour de l'Avenir
8th Overall Circuito Montañés

1st Stage 1

8th Overall Tour de Bretagne
8th Overall Tour du Poitou-Charentes
10th Overall Circuit de Lorraine

1st Stage 4

10th Ronde van Drenthe
2010
2nd GP Miguel Induráin
7th Overall Volta a Catalunya
10th Paris–Bourges
2011
1st Stage 2 Circuit Cycliste Sarthe
6th Coppa Bernocchi
10th Coppa Ugo Agostoni
10th Vattenfall Cyclassics
2012
1st Madison, National Track Championships (with Raymond Kreder)
1st Stage 2 Circuit de la Sarthe
2nd Overall Tour Méditerranéen

1st Young rider classification
1st Stages 2 & 3

4th Road race, National Road Championships
5th Nokere Koerse
8th Clásica de Almería
2013
9th Overall Four Days of Dunkirk

1st Stage 4

2014
4th La Drôme Classic
6th Volta Limburg Classic
10th Giro dell'Emilia
2016
6th Nokere Koerse
2017
3rd Overall Arctic Race of Norway
5th Overall Tour de Wallonie
9th Eschborn–Frankfurt – Rund um den Finanzplatz

=== Grand Tour general classification results timeline ===
Grand Tour	2010	2011	2012	2013	2014	2015	2016	2017
Giro d'Italia	Did not contest during his career							
Tour de France	Did not contest during his career							
Vuelta a España	152	—	96	DNF	—	—	—	128

Legend
—	Did not compete
DNF	Did not finish
