= 2013 in men's road cycling =

== World Championships ==
The World Road Championships was held in Florence, Italy.

Race	Date	Winner	Second	Third	Ref
World Championship Team Time Trial	September 22	(Belgium) Omega Pharma–Quick-Step	(Australia) Orica–GreenEDGE	(United Kingdom) Team Sky	
World Championship Time Trial	September 25	Tony Martin (GER)	Bradley Wiggins (GBR)	Fabian Cancellara (SUI)	
World Championship Road Race	September 29	Rui Costa (POR)	Joaquim Rodríguez (ESP)	Alejandro Valverde (ESP)	

== Grand Tours ==
Race	Date	Winner	Second	Third	Ref
(Italy) Giro d'Italia	May 4–26	Vincenzo Nibali (ITA)	Rigoberto Urán (COL)	Cadel Evans (AUS)	
Tour de France	June 29 – July 21	Chris Froome (GBR)	Nairo Quintana (COL)	Joaquim Rodríguez (ESP)	
(Spain) Vuelta a España	August 24 – September 15	Chris Horner (USA)	Vincenzo Nibali (ITA)	Alejandro Valverde (ESP)	

== UCI World Tour ==
Race	Date	Winner	Second	Third	Ref
(Australia) Tour Down Under	January 22–27	Tom-Jelte Slagter (NED)	Javier Moreno (ESP)	Geraint Thomas (GBR)	
(France) Paris–Nice	March 3–10	Richie Porte (AUS)	Andrew Talansky (USA)	Jean-Christophe Péraud (FRA)	
(Italy) Tirreno–Adriatico	March 6–12	Vincenzo Nibali (ITA)	Chris Froome (GBR)	Alberto Contador (ESP)	
(Italy) Milan–San Remo	March 17	Gerald Ciolek (GER)	Peter Sagan (SVK)	Fabian Cancellara (SWI)	
(Spain) Volta a Catalunya	March 18–24	Dan Martin (IRL)	Joaquim Rodríguez (ESP)	Michele Scarponi (ITA)	
(Belgium) E3 Harelbeke	March 22	Fabian Cancellara (SUI)	Peter Sagan (SVK)	Daniel Oss (ITA)	
(Belgium) Gent–Wevelgem	March 24	Peter Sagan (SVK)	Borut Božič (SLO)	Greg Van Avermaet (BEL)	
(Belgium) Tour of Flanders	March 31	Fabian Cancellara (SUI)	Peter Sagan (SVK)	Jürgen Roelandts (BEL)	
(Spain) Tour of the Basque Country	April 1–6	Nairo Quintana (COL)	Richie Porte (AUS)	Sergio Henao (COL)	
(France) Paris–Roubaix	April 7	Fabian Cancellara (SUI)	Sep Vanmarcke (BEL)	Niki Terpstra (NED)	
(Netherlands) Amstel Gold Race	April 14	Roman Kreuziger (CZE)	Alejandro Valverde (ESP)	Simon Gerrans (AUS)	
(Belgium) La Flèche Wallonne	April 17	Daniel Moreno (ESP)	Sergio Henao (COL)	Carlos Betancur (COL)	
(Belgium) Liège–Bastogne–Liège	April 21	Dan Martin (IRL)	Joaquim Rodríguez (ESP)	Alejandro Valverde (ESP)	
(Switzerland) Tour de Romandie	April 23–28	Chris Froome (GBR)	Simon Špilak (SVK)	Rui Costa (POR)	
(France) Critérium du Dauphiné	June 2–9	Chris Froome (GBR)	Richie Porte (AUS)	Daniel Moreno (ESP)	
(Switzerland) Tour de Suisse	June 8–16	Rui Costa (POR)	Bauke Mollema (NED)	Roman Kreuziger (CZE)	
(Spain) Clásica de San Sebastián	July 27	Tony Gallopin (FRA)	Alejandro Valverde (ESP)	Roman Kreuziger (CZE)	
(Poland) Tour de Pologne	July 27 – August 3	Pieter Weening (NED)	Jon Izagirre (ESP)	Christophe Riblon (FRA)	
(Belgium) (Netherlands) Eneco Tour	August 12–18	Zdeněk Štybar (CZE)	Tom Dumoulin (NED)	Andriy Hryvko (UKR)	
(Germany) Vattenfall Cyclassics	August 25	John Degenkolb (GER)	André Greipel (GER)	Alexander Kristoff (NOR)	
GP Ouest-France	September 1	Filippo Pozzato (ITA)	Giacomo Nizzolo (GER)	Samuel Dumoulin (FRA)	
(Canada) GP de Québec	September 13	Robert Gesink (NED)	Arthur Vichot (FRA)	Greg Van Avermaet (BEL)	
(Canada) GP de Montréal	September 15	Peter Sagan (SVK)	Simone Ponzi (ITA)	Ryder Hesjedal (CAN)	
(Italy) Giro di Lombardia	October 6	Joaquim Rodríguez (ESP)	Alejandro Valverde (ESP)	Rafał Majka (POL)	
(China) Tour of Beijing	October 11–15	Beñat Intxausti (ESP)	Dan Martin (IRL)	David López (ESP)	

== 2.HC Category Races ==
Race	Date	Winner	Second	Third	Ref
Tour of Qatar	February 3–8	Mark Cavendish (GBR)	Brent Bookwalter (USA)	Taylor Phinney (USA)	
Tour of Oman	February 11–16	Chris Froome (GBR)	Alberto Contador (ESP)	Cadel Evans (AUS)	
(Malaysia) Tour de Langkawi	February 21 – March 2	Julián Arredondo (COL)	Pieter Weening (NED)	Sergio Pardilla (ESP)	
(France) Critérium International	March 23–24	Chris Froome (GBR)	Richie Porte (AUS)	Tejay van Garderen (USA)	
(Belgium) Three Days of De Panne	March 26–28	Sylvain Chavanel (FRA)	Alexander Kristoff (NOR)	Niki Terpstra (NED)	
(Italy) Giro del Trentino	April 16–19	Vincenzo Nibali (ITA)	Mauro Santambrogio (ITA)	Maxime Bouet (FRA)	
Presidential Tour of Turkey	April 21–28	Mustafa Sayar (TUR)	Natnael Berhane (ERI)	Yoann Bagot (FRA)	
(France) Four Days of Dunkirk	May 1–5	Arnaud Démare (FRA)	Florian Vachon (FRA)	Ramon Sinkeldam (NED)	
(United States) Tour of California	May 12–19	Tejay van Garderen (USA)	Michael Rogers (AUS)	Janier Acevedo (COL)	
Tour of Belgium	May 22–26	Tony Martin (GER)	Luis León Sánchez (ESP)	Philippe Gilbert (BEL)	
(Germany) Bayern-Rundfahrt	May 22–26	Adriano Malori (ITA)	Geraint Thomas (GBR)	Jan Bárta (CZE)	
Tour de Luxembourg	June 12–16	Paul Martens (GER)	Jonathan Hivert (FRA)	Jan Bakelants (BEL)	
(Austria) Österreich Rundfahrt	June 30 – July 7	Riccardo Zoidl (AUT)	Alexandr Dyachenko (KAZ)	Kevin Seeldraeyers (BEL)	
(China) Tour of Qinghai Lake	July 7–20	Samad Pourseyedi (IRI)	Yevgeniy Nepomnyachshiy (KAZ)	Daniil Fominykh (KAZ)	
(Belgium) Tour de Wallonie	July 20–24	Greg Van Avermaet (BEL)	Anthony Geslin (FRA)	Alexandr Kolobnev (RUS)	
(Denmark) Danmark Rundt	July 31 – August 1	Wilco Kelderman (NED)	Lars Bak (DEN)	Matti Breschel (DEN)	
(Spain) Vuelta a Burgos	August 7–11	Nairo Quintana (COL)	Amets Txurruka (ESP)	Anthony Roux (FRA)	
(United States) USA Pro Cycling Challenge	August 19–25	Tejay van Garderen (USA)	Mathias Frank (SUI)	Tom Danielson (USA)	
(China) Tour of Hainan	October 20–28	Moreno Hofland (NED)	Frédéric Amorison (BEL)	Tom Leezer (NED)	

== 1.HC Category Races ==
Race	Date	Winner	Second	Third	Ref
(Belgium) Omloop Het Nieuwsblad	February 23	Luca Paolini (ITA)	Stijn Vandenbergh (BEL)	Sven Vandousselaere (BEL)	
(Spain) Clásica de Almería	February 24	Mark Renshaw (AUS)	Reinardt Janse van Rensburg (RSA)	Francesco Lasca (ITA)	
(Belgium) Dwars door Vlaanderen	March 20	Oscar Gatto (ITA)	Borut Božič (SVN)	Mathew Hayman (AUS)	
(Belgium) Scheldeprijs	April 3	Marcel Kittel (GER)	Mark Cavendish (GBR)	Barry Markus (NED)	
(Belgium) Brabantse Pijl	April 10	Peter Sagan (SVK)	Philippe Gilbert (BEL)	Bjorn Leukemans (BEL)	
(Germany) Rund um den Finanzplatz	May 1	Simon Špilak (SLO)	Moreno Moser (ITA)	André Greipel (GER)	
(Italy) Tre Valli Varesine	August 21	Kristijan Đurasek (CRO)	Francesco Manuel Bongiorno (ITA)	Alexandr Kolobnev (RUS)	
(Belgium) Paris–Bruxelles	September 7	André Greipel (GER)	John Degenkolb (GER)	Nacer Bouhanni (FRA)	
(France) Grand Prix de Fourmies	September 8	Nacer Bouhanni (FRA)	André Greipel (GER)	Bryan Coquard (FRA)	
(Italy) Milano–Torino	October 2	Diego Ulissi (ITA)	Rafał Majka (POL)	Daniel Moreno (ESP)	
(France) Tour de Vendée	October 6	Nacer Bouhanni (FRA)	Samuel Dumoulin (FRA)	Steven Tronet (FRA)	
(Italy) Giro dell'Emilia	October 12	Diego Ulissi (ITA)	Chris Anker Sørensen (DEN)	Davide Villella (ITA)	
(France) Paris–Tours	October 13	John Degenkolb (GER)	Michael Mørkøv (DEN)	Arnaud Démare (FRA)	
Japan Cup	October 20	Michael Rogers (AUS)	Jack Bauer (NZL)	Damiano Cunego (ITA)	

== UCI tours ==
Tour	Individual champion	Individual champion's team	Team champion	Nations champion
World Tour	Joaquim Rodríguez (ESP)	Team Katusha	Movistar Team	Spain
Africa Tour	Adil Jelloul (MAR)	No team	MTN–Qhubeka	Morocco
America Tour	Janier Acevedo (COL)	Jamis-Hagens Berman	UnitedHealthcare	Colombia
Asia Tour	Julián Arredondo (COL)	Team Nippo-De Rosa	Tabriz Petrochemical CCN Team	Iran
Europe Tour	Riccardo Zoidl (AUT)	RC Gourmetfein Wels	Team TotalEnergies	France
Oceania Tour	Damien Howson (AUS)	No team	Huon Salmon–Genesys Wealth Advisers	Australia

== Continental Championships ==
=== African Championships ===
Race	Date	Winner	Second	Third
Road race	November 11, 2012	Natnael Berhane (ERI)	Jay Thomson (RSA)	Frekalsi Debesay (ERI)
Individual time trial	November 9, 2012	Daniel Teklehaymanot (ERI)	Tsgabu Grmay (ETH)	Jay Thomson (RSA)
Team time trial	November 7, 2012	Eritrea; Natnael Berhane; Frekalsi Debesay; Daniel Teklehaymanot; Jani Tewelde	Tunisia; Said Ali Akkouche; Rafaâ Chtioui; Maher Hasnaoui; Ahmed M'Raihi	Algeria; Adel Barbari; Hichem Chaabane; Karim Hadjbouzit; Fayçal Hamza

=== Asian Championships ===
Race	Date	Winner	Second	Third
Road race	March 17	Muradjan Halmuratov (UZB)	Arvin Moazzemi (IRI)	Andrey Mizurov (KAZ)
Individual time trial	March 14	Muradjan Halmuratov (UZB)	Andrey Mizurov (KAZ)	Evgeny Vakker (KGZ)

=== European Championships (under-23) ===
Race	Date	Winner	Second	Third
Road race (under-23)	July 21	Sean De Bie (BEL)	Petr Vakoč (CZE)	Toms Skujiņš (LAT)
Individual time trial (under-23)	July 18	Victor Campenaerts (BEL)	Oleksandr Golovash (UKR)	Jasha Sütterlin (DEU)

=== Oceania Championships ===
Race	Date	Winner	Second	Third
Road race	March 17	Cameron Meyer (AUS)	Damien Howson (AUS)	Jack Anderson (AUS)
Individual time trial	March 14	Paul Odlin (NZL)	Benjamin Dyball (AUS)	Joseph Cooper (NZL)

=== Pan American Championships ===
Race	Date	Winner	Second	Third
Road race	May 5	Jonathan Paredes (COL)	Ignacio Diaz (MEX)	Segundo Navarrete (ECU)
Individual time trial	May 2	Carlos Oyarzun (CHI)	Ignacio Diaz (MEX)	Leandro Messineo (ARG)

== International Games ==
=== Games of the Small States of Europe ===
Race	Winner	Second	Third
Road race	Joël Zangerle (LUX)	Hans Burkhard (LIE)	Tom Thill (LUX)
Time trial	Stefan Küng (LIE)	Alex Kirsch (LUX)	Christian Helmig (LUX)

=== Island Games ===
Race	Winner	Second	Third
Road race	Tobyn Horton (GGY)	Torkil Veyhe (FRO)	Andrew Roche (IOM)
Time trial	Andrew Roche (IOM)	Torkil Veyhe (FRO)	Shannon Lawrence (BER)
Road race team	Guernsey	Isle of Man	Jersey
Time trial team	Isle of Man	Guernsey	Jersey
Town centre criterium	Tobyn Horton (GGY)	Richard Tanguy (Jersey)	Greg Mansell (Jersey)

=== Mediterranean Games ===
Race	Winner	Second	Third
Road race	Nicola Ruffoni (ITA)	Christophe Laporte (FRA)	Abdelbasat Hanachi (ALG)
Time trial	Yoann Paillot (FRA)	Luis Mas Bonet (ESP)	Rasim Reis (TUR)

=== East Asian Games ===
Race	Winner	Second	Third
Road race	Feng Chun-kai (TWN)	Altanzul Altansukh (MGL)	Tuguldur Tuulkhangai (MGL)

=== Southeast Asian Games ===
Race	Winner	Second	Third
Road race	Alex Destribois (LAO)	Mai Nguyen Hung (VIE)	Robin Manulang (INA)
Time trial	Mark Galedo (PHI)	Robin Manulang (INA)	Ronald Oranza (PHI)
Team time trial	Vietnam; Le Van Duan; Nguyen Thanh Tam; Trinh Duc Tam; Mai Nguyen Hung	Thailand; Sarawut Sirironnachai; Thurakit Boonratanathanakorn; Puchong Sai-Udomsin; Nawuti Liphongyu	Malaysia; Mohamed Rauf Nur Misbah; Amir Rusli; Muhamad Othman; Mohamed Lutfi

== UCI Teams ==
=== UCI ProTeams ===
2013 UCI Pro Teams and equipment
Code	Official team name	License holder	Country	Groupset	Bicycles
ALM	Ag2r–La Mondiale (2013 season)	EUSRL France Cyclisme	France	SRAM	Focus
ARG	Argos–Shimano (2013 season)	SMS Cycling	Netherlands	Shimano	Felt
AST	Astana (2013 season)	Olympus Sarl	Kazakhstan	Campagnolo	Specialized
BMC	BMC Racing Team (2013 season)	Continuum Sports LLC	United States	Shimano	BMC
EUS	Euskaltel–Euskadi (2013 season)	Fundación Ciclista Euskadi	Spain	Shimano	Orbea
FDJ	FDJ.fr (2013 season)	Société de Gestion de L'Echappée	France	Shimano	Lapierre
GRM	Garmin–Sharp (2013 season)	Slipstream Sports, LLC	United States	Shimano	Cervélo
OGE	Orica–GreenEDGE (2013 season)	Lachlan Smith	Australia	Shimano	Scott
LAM	Lampre–Merida (2013 season)	Total Cycling Limited	Italy	Shimano	Merida
CAN	Cannondale (2013 season)	Brixia Sports	Italy	SRAM	Cannondale
LTB	Lotto–Belisol (2013 season)	Belgian Cycling Company sa	Belgium	Campagnolo	Ridley
MOV	Movistar Team (2013 season)	Abarca Sports S.L.	Spain	Campagnolo	Pinarello
OPQ	Omega Pharma–Quick-Step (2013 season)	Esperanza bvba	Belgium	SRAM	Specialized
BEL	Belkin Pro Cycling (2013 season)	Rabo Wielerploegen	Netherlands	Shimano	Giant
KAT	Team Katusha (2013 season)	Katusha Management SA	Russia	Shimano	Canyon
RLT	RadioShack–Leopard (2013 season)	Trek Bicycle Corporation (Note: Trek announced that it bought the license of RadioShack Leopard on 26 June 2013.)	Luxembourg	Shimano	Trek
SAX	Saxo–Tinkoff (2013 season)	Riis Cycling A/S	Denmark	SRAM	Specialized
SKY	Team Sky (2013 season)	Tour Racing Limited	United Kingdom	Shimano	Pinarello
VCD	Vacansoleil–DCM (2013 season)	STL–Pro Cycling B.V.	Netherlands	Shimano	Bianchi

== See also ==
- 2013 in women's road cycling
