= 2013 BMC Racing Team season =

2013 BMC Racing Team season
Manager	Jim Ochowicz
One-day victories	1
Stage race overall victories	4
Stage race stage victories	22
Previous season • Next season

The 2013 season for the BMC Racing Team began in January with the Tour Down Under. As a UCI ProTeam, they were automatically invited and obligated to send a squad to every event in the UCI World Tour.

== Team roster ==
As of 1 January 2013.

Rider	Date of birth
Alessandro Ballan (ITA)	November 6, 1979 (aged 33)
Adam Blythe (GBR)	October 1, 1989 (aged 23)
Brent Bookwalter (USA)	February 16, 1984 (aged 28)
Marcus Burghardt (GER)	June 30, 1983 (aged 29)
Steve Cummings (GBR)	March 19, 1981 (aged 31)
Silvan Dillier (Note: Dillier joined the team on August 1 as a stagiaire, from the BMC Development Team.) (SUI)	August 3, 1990 (aged 22)
Yannick Eijssen (BEL)	June 26, 1989 (aged 23)
Cadel Evans (AUS)	February 14, 1977 (aged 35)
Mathias Frank (SUI)	December 9, 1986 (aged 26)
Philippe Gilbert (BEL)	July 5, 1982 (aged 30)
Thor Hushovd (NOR)	January 18, 1978 (aged 34)
Martin Kohler (SUI)	July 17, 1985 (aged 27)
Sebastian Lander (DEN)	March 11, 1991 (aged 21)
Klaas Lodewyck (BEL)	March 24, 1988 (aged 24)
Amaël Moinard (FRA)	February 2, 1982 (aged 30)

Rider	Date of birth
Steve Morabito (SUI)	January 30, 1983 (aged 29)
Dominik Nerz (GER)	August 25, 1989 (aged 23)
Jakub Novák (Note: Novák joined the team on August 1 as a stagiaire, from the BMC Development Team.) (CZE)	December 30, 1990 (aged 22)
Daniel Oss (ITA)	January 13, 1987 (aged 25)
Taylor Phinney (USA)	June 27, 1990 (aged 22)
Marco Pinotti (ITA)	February 25, 1976 (aged 36)
Manuel Quinziato (ITA)	October 30, 1979 (aged 33)
Ivan Santaromita (ITA)	April 30, 1984 (aged 28)
Michael Schär (SUI)	September 29, 1986 (aged 26)
Julien Taramarcaz (Note: Taramarcaz joined the team on August 1 as a stagiaire, from the BMC Mountainbike Racing Team.) (SUI)	November 12, 1987 (aged 25)
Greg Van Avermaet (BEL)	May 17, 1985 (aged 27)
Tejay van Garderen (USA)	August 12, 1988 (aged 24)
Larry Warbasse (USA)	June 28, 1990 (aged 22)
Danilo Wyss (SUI)	August 26, 1985 (aged 27)

Riders who joined the team for the 2013 season

Rider	2012 team
Sebastian Lander	Glud & Marstrand–LRØ
Dominik Nerz	Liquigas–Cannondale
Daniel Oss	Liquigas–Cannondale
Larry Warbasse	neo-pro (stagiaire, BMC Racing Team)

Riders who left the team during or after the 2012 season

Rider	2013 team
George Hincapie	Retired
Tim Roe	BMC Development Team
Mauro Santambrogio	Vini Fantini–Selle Italia
Johann Tschopp	IAM Cycling

== Season victories ==
Date	Race	Competition	Rider	Country	Location
January 27	Tour de San Luis, Teams classification	UCI America Tour	(Note: The riders on the squad were Tejay van Garderen, Mathias Frank, Manuel Quinziato, Thor Hushovd, Daniel Oss, and Dominik Nerz)	Argentina	
February 3	Tour of Qatar, Stage 1	UCI Asia Tour	Brent Bookwalter (USA)	Qatar	Dukhan Beach
February 4	Tour of Qatar, Stage 2	UCI Asia Tour	Team time trial (Note: The riders on the squad were Taylor Phinney, Adam Blythe, Brent Bookwalter, Steve Cummings, Yannick Eijssen, Michael Schär, Greg Van Avermaet, and Larry Warbasse)	Qatar	Al Rufaa Street
February 8	Tour of Qatar, Young rider classification	UCI Asia Tour	Taylor Phinney (USA)	Qatar	
February 8	Tour of Qatar, Teams classification	UCI Asia Tour		Qatar	
February 16	Tour of Oman, Teams classification	UCI Asia Tour	(Note: The riders on the squad were Philippe Gilbert, Brent Bookwalter, Steve Cummings, Yannick Eijssen, Cadel Evans, Michael Schär, Greg Van Avermaet, and Taylor Phinney)	Oman	
February 16	Tour du Haut Var, Stage 1	UCI Europe Tour	Thor Hushovd (NOR)	France	La Croix-Valmer
February 17	Tour du Haut Var, Points classification	UCI Europe Tour	Thor Hushovd (NOR)	France	
March 24	Critérium International, Young rider classification	UCI Europe Tour	Tejay van Garderen (USA)	France	
April 18	Giro del Trentino, Stage 3	UCI Europe Tour	Ivan Santaromita (ITA)	Italy	Condino
April 28	Tour de Romandie, Mountains classification	UCI World Tour	Marcus Burghardt (GER)	Switzerland	
May 17	Tour of California, Stage 6	UCI America Tour	Tejay van Garderen (USA)	United States	San Jose
May 19	Tour of California, Overall	UCI America Tour	Tejay van Garderen (USA)	United States	
May 19	Tour of California, Teams classification	UCI America Tour	(Note: The riders on the squad were Tejay van Garderen, Brent Bookwalter, Mathias Frank, Philippe Gilbert, Thor Hushovd, Amaël Moinard, Marco Pinotti, and Michael Schär)	United States	
June 22	Trofeo Melinda (Note: Race held as the Italian National Road Race Championships)	UCI Europe Tour	Ivan Santaromita (ITA)	Italy	Trentino-Alto Adige/Südtirol
July 2	Tour of Austria, Stage 3	UCI Europe Tour	Thor Hushovd (NOR)	Austria	Matrei
July 3	Tour of Austria, Stage 4	UCI Europe Tour	Mathias Frank (SUI)	Austria	Sankt Johann
July 4	Tour of Austria, Stage 5	UCI Europe Tour	Mathias Frank (SUI)	Austria	Sonntagberg
July 22	Tour de Wallonie, Stage 3	UCI Europe Tour	Greg Van Avermaet (BEL)	Belgium	Bastogne
July 24	Tour de Wallonie, Stage 5	UCI Europe Tour	Greg Van Avermaet (BEL)	Belgium	Thuin
July 24	Tour de Wallonie, Overall	UCI Europe Tour	Greg Van Avermaet (BEL)	Belgium	
July 24	Tour de Wallonie, Points classification	UCI Europe Tour	Greg Van Avermaet (BEL)	Belgium	
July 30	Tour de Pologne, Stage 3	UCI World Tour	Thor Hushovd (NOR)	Poland	Rzeszów
July 31	Tour de Pologne, Stage 4	UCI World Tour	Taylor Phinney (USA)	Poland	Katowice
August 1	Tour de Pologne, Stage 5	UCI World Tour	Thor Hushovd (NOR)	Poland	Zakopane
August 6	Tour of Utah, Stage 1	UCI America Tour	Greg Van Avermaet (BEL)	United States	Cedar City
August 9	Arctic Race of Norway, Stage 2	UCI Europe Tour	Thor Hushovd (NOR)	Norway	Svolvær
August 11	Arctic Race of Norway, Stage 4	UCI Europe Tour	Thor Hushovd (NOR)	Norway	Harstad
August 11	Arctic Race of Norway, Overall	UCI Europe Tour	Thor Hushovd (NOR)	Norway	
August 11	Arctic Race of Norway, Points classification	UCI Europe Tour	Thor Hushovd (NOR)	Norway	
August 20	USA Pro Cycling Challenge, Stage 2	UCI America Tour	Mathias Frank (SUI)	United States	Breckenridge
August 23	USA Pro Cycling Challenge, Stage 5	UCI America Tour	Tejay van Garderen (USA)	United States	Vail Pass
August 25	USA Pro Cycling Challenge, Overall	UCI America Tour	Tejay van Garderen (USA)	United States	
August 25	USA Pro Cycling Challenge, Teams classification	UCI America Tour	(Note: The riders on the squad were Tejay van Garderen, Steve Cummings, Mathias Frank, Michael Schär, Greg Van Avermaet, Larry Warbasse, Julien Taramarcaz, and Brent Bookwalter)	United States	
September 5	Vuelta a España, Stage 12	UCI World Tour	Philippe Gilbert (BEL)	Spain	Tarragona
September 5	Tour of Alberta, Stage 2	UCI America Tour	Silvan Dillier (SUI) (Note: Dillier won the stage, as a stagiaire.)	Canada	Red Deer
September 7	Tour of Alberta, Stage 4	UCI America Tour	Cadel Evans (AUS)	Canada	Black Diamond
September 8	Tour of Alberta, Teams classification	UCI America Tour	(Note: The riders on the squad were Cadel Evans, Brent Bookwalter, Marcus Burghardt, Amaël Moinard, Steve Morabito, Larry Warbasse, Silvan Dillier, and Jakub Novák)	Canada	
October 11	Tour of Beijing, Stage 1	UCI World Tour	Thor Hushovd (NOR)	China	Huairou
October 15	Tour of Beijing, Teams classification	UCI World Tour	(Note: The riders on the squad were Thor Hushovd, Steve Cummings, Mathias Frank, Martin Kohler, Marcus Burghardt, Dominik Nerz, Larry Warbasse, and Marco Pinotti)	China	
