= 2012–13 UCI America Tour =

- Ninth edition of the UCI America Tour

Details
- Dates: 7 October 2012–7 September 2013
- Location: North America and South America
- Races: 28

Champions
- Individual champion: Janier Acevedo (COL) (Jamis–Hagens Berman)
- Teams' champion: UnitedHealthcare
- Nations' champion: Colombia

The 2012–13 UCI America Tour was the ninth season for the UCI America Tour. The season began on 7 October 2012 with the Tobago Cycling Classic and ended on 7 September 2013 with the Bucks County Classic.

The points leader, based on the cumulative results of previous races, wears the UCI America Tour cycling jersey. Rory Sutherland from Australia was the defending champion of the 2011–12 UCI America Tour. Janier Acevedo from Colombia was crowned as the 2012–13 UCI America Tour champion.

Throughout the season, points are awarded to the top finishers of stages within stage races and the final general classification standings of each of the stages races and one-day events. The quality and complexity of a race also determines how many points are awarded to the top finishers, the higher the UCI rating of a race, the more points are awarded.

The UCI ratings from highest to lowest are as follows:

- Multi-day events: 2.HC, 2.1 and 2.2
- One-day events: 1.HC, 1.1 and 1.2

== Events ==
=== 2012 ===
| Date | Race name | Location | UCI Rating | Winner | Team |
|---|---|---|---|---|---|
| 7 October | Tobago Cycling Classic | Trinidad and Tobago | 1.2 | Darren Matthews (BAR) | Barbados Cycling Union |
| 14–21 October | Volta de São Paulo | Brazil | 2.2 | Magno Nazaret (BRA) | Funvic–Pindamonhangaba |
| 2–11 November | Vuelta a Bolivia | Bolivia | 2.2 | Maky Román (VEN) | Prodem-Lotería del Táchira |
| 18–25 November | Vuelta Mundo Maya | Guatemala | 2.2 | Giovanny Báez (COL) | EPM–UNE |
| 17–29 December | Vuelta a Costa Rica | Costa Rica | 2.2 | Óscar Sánchez (COL) | GW–Shimano |

=== 2013 ===
| Date | Race name | Location | UCI Rating | Winner | Team |
|---|---|---|---|---|---|
| 6 January | Copa América de Ciclismo | Brazil | 1.2 | Francisco Chamorro (ARG) | Funvic Brasilinvest–São José dos Campos |
| 11–20 January | Vuelta al Táchira | Venezuela | 2.2 | Yeison Delgado (VEN) | Kino Táchira-Drodínica |
| 21–27 January | Tour de San Luis | Argentina | 2.1 | Daniel Díaz (ARG) | San Luis Somos Todos |
| 21–28 April | Vuelta a Guatemala | Guatemala | 2.2 | Óscar Sánchez (COL) | GW–Shimano |
| 1–5 May | Tour of the Gila | United States | 2.2 | Philip Deignan (IRL) | UnitedHealthcare |
| 2 May | Pan American Cycling Championships – Time Trial | Mexico | CC | Carlos Oyarzun (CHI) | Chile national team |
| 5 May | Pan American Cycling Championships – Road Race | Mexico | CC | Jonathan Paredes (COL) | Colombia national team |
| 12–19 May | Tour of California | United States | 2.HC | Tejay van Garderen (USA) | BMC Racing Team |
| 2 June | The Philly Cycling Classic | United States | 1.2 | Kiel Reijnen (USA) | UnitedHealthcare |
| 7–9 June | Coupe des Nations Ville Saguenay | Canada | 2.Ncup | Sondre Enger (NOR) | Norway national team |
| 9–23 June | Vuelta a Colombia | Colombia | 2.2 | Óscar Sevilla (ESP) | EPM–UNE |
| 11–16 June | Tour de Beauce | Canada | 2.2 | Nathan Brown (USA) | Bontrager Cycling Team |
| 7 July | Tour de Delta | Canada | 1.2 | Steve Fisher (USA) | Hagens Berman Cycling |
| 19–28 July | Vuelta a Venezuela | Venezuela | 2.2 | Carlos José Ochoa (VEN) | Androni Giocattoli–Venezuela |
| 2–4 August | Tour of Elk Grove | United States | 2.1 | Elia Viviani (ITA) | Cannondale |
| 6–11 August | Tour of Utah | United States | 2.1 | Tom Danielson (USA) | Garmin–Sharp |
| 6–11 August | Ruta del Centro | Mexico | 2.2 | Víctor García (ESP) | Depredadores PBG Design |
| 14–18 August | Vuelta al Sur de Bolivia | Bolivia | 2.2 | Óscar Soliz (BOL) | Pio Rico |
| 19–25 August | USA Pro Cycling Challenge | United States | 2.HC | Tejay van Garderen (USA) | BMC Racing Team |
| 28 Aug–1 Sep | Tour do Rio | Brazil | 2.2 | Óscar Sevilla (ESP) | EPM–UNE |
| 3–8 September | Tour of Alberta | Canada | 2.1 | Rohan Dennis (AUS) | Garmin–Sharp |
| 7 September | Bucks County Classic | United States | 1.2 | Kiel Reijnen (USA) | UnitedHealthcare |

== Final standings ==
There is a competition for the rider, team and country with the most points gained from winning or achieving a high place in the above races.

=== Individual classification ===
| Rank | Name | Points |
|---|---|---|
| 1 | Janier Acevedo (COL) | 247 |
| 2 | Óscar Sánchez (COL) | 180 |
| 3 | Ryan Anderson (CAN) | 165 |
| 4 | Kiel Reijnen (USA) | 138 |
| 5 | Francisco Mancebo (ESP) | 130 |
| 6 | Daniel Díaz (ARG) | 129.67 |
| 7 | Jonathan Millan (COL) | 120 |
| 8 | Óscar Soliz (BOL) | 118 |
| 9 | Óscar Sevilla (ESP) | 115 |
| 10 | Philip Deignan (IRL) | 113 |

=== Team classification ===
| Rank | Team | Points |
|---|---|---|
| 1 | UnitedHealthcare | 441 |
| 2 | Optum–Kelly Benefit Strategies | 366 |
| 3 | Funvic Brasilinvest–São José dos Campos | 348 |
| 4 | Jamis–Hagens Berman | 345 |
| 5 | EPM–UNE | 324.67 |
| 6 | San Luis Somos Todos | 196.68 |
| 7 | Bontrager Cycling Team | 186 |
| 8 | Jelly Belly–Kenda | 179 |
| 9 | 5-hour Energy | 154 |
| 10 | Androni Giocattoli–Venezuela | 152 |

=== Nation classification ===
| Rank | Nation | Points |
|---|---|---|
| 1 | Colombia | 1460.07 |
| 2 | United States | 876.33 |
| 3 | Venezuela | 596.87 |
| 4 | Brazil | 512 |
| 5 | Canada | 416.45 |
| 6 | Mexico | 405 |
| 7 | Argentina | 381.34 |
| 8 | Costa Rica | 295 |
| 9 | Ecuador | 240 |
| 10 | Bolivia | 216 |

=== Nation under-23 classification ===
| Rank | Nation | Points |
|---|---|---|
| 1 | Colombia | 330.67 |
| 2 | United States | 266 |
| 3 | Ecuador | 90 |
| 4 | Guatemala | 72 |
| 5 | Argentina | 58 |
| 6 | El Salvador | 57 |
| 7 | Mexico | 53 |
| 8 | Brazil | 48 |
| 9 | Panama | 43 |
| 10 | Barbados | 40 |
