= Carter Jones =

American racing cyclist

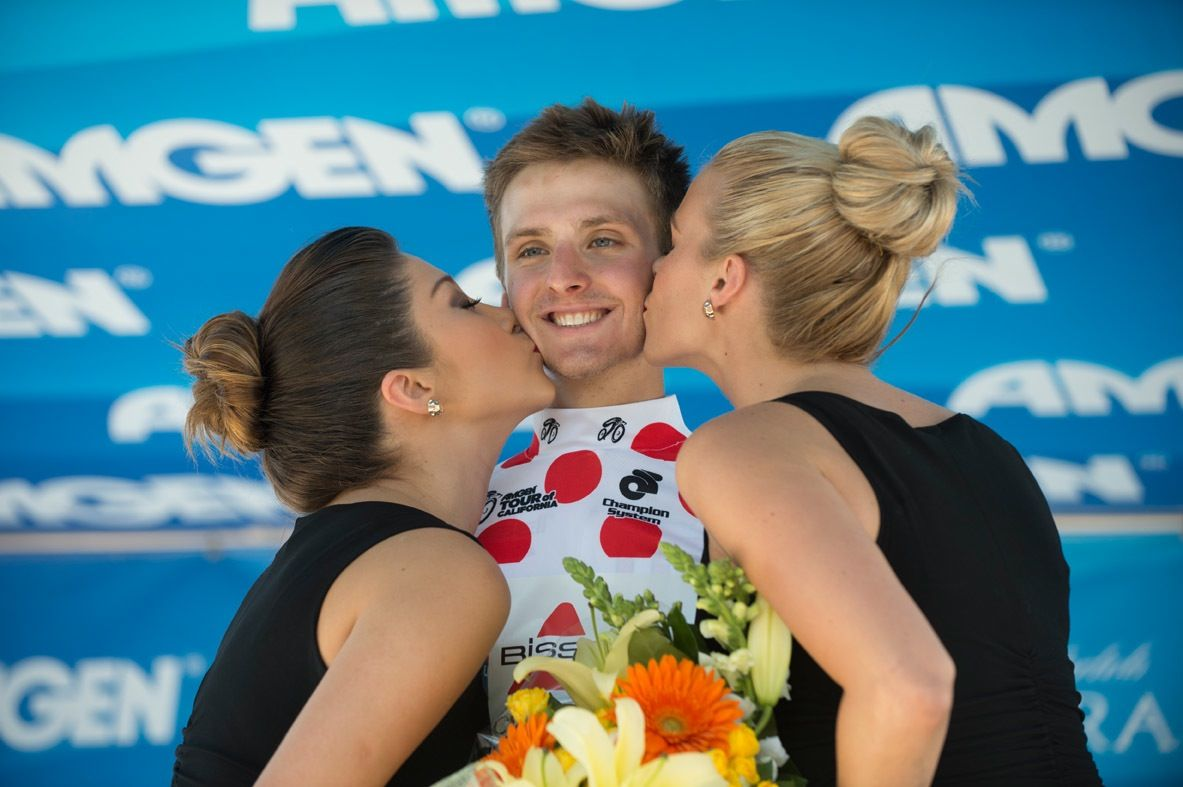
- Carter Jones, Tour of California 2012

Personal information
- Full name: Carter Jones
- Born: February 27, 1989 (age 37) Maplewood, New Jersey, United States
- Height: 1.83 m (6 ft 0 in)
- Weight: 67 kg (148 lb)

Cycling career
- Sport: Cycling
- Current team: Retired
- Discipline: Road
- Role: Rider
- Rider type: All-rounder

Professional teams
- 2010: Jelly Belly–Kenda
- 2011: Trek–Livestrong
- 2012–2013: Bissell
- 2014: Optum–Kelly Benefit Strategies
- 2015–2016: Team Giant–Alpecin

Carter Jones (born February 27, 1989) is an American former professional road racing cyclist. He had a professional cycling career between 2010 and 2016 for various teams, including Jelly Belly–Kenda, Trek–Livestrong, Bissell, Optum–Kelly Benefit Strategies, and Team Giant–Alpecin.

On June 24, 2016, Jones announced the termination of his contract with Team Giant–Alpecin, and his retirement from professional cycling, citing injuries sustained in accidents during the 2015 and 2016 seasons.

Jones resides in Boulder, Colorado.

== Major results ==
2010
National Road Championships

2nd Under-23 time trial
4th Time Trial

5th Overall Redlands Cycling Classic
2011
3rd Overall Tour de Guadeloupe

1st Young rider classification

4th Time trial, National Under-23 Road Championships
9th Overall Cascade Cycling Classic
2012
1st Stage 5 Tour of Southland
2nd Overall Cascade Cycling Classic

1st Young rider classification

2013
1st Mountains classification Tour of California
8th Overall Tour of the Gila
8th Overall Tour of Utah
2014
1st Overall Tour of the Gila
7th Overall Tour of Utah
8th Overall USA Pro Cycling Challenge
