= Janier Acevedo =

Colombian cyclist

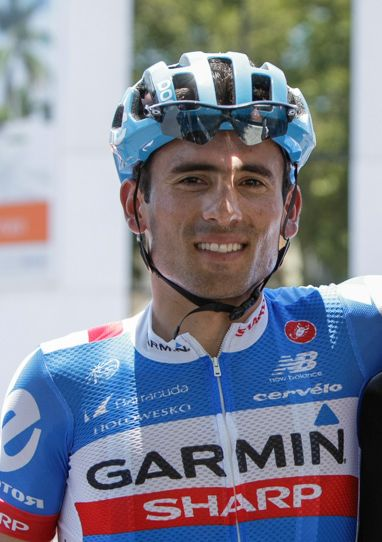
- Acevedo at the 2014 Tour de San Luis

Personal information
- Full name: Janier Alexis Acevedo Calle
- Born: 6 December 1985 (age 40) Caramanta, Colombia
- Height: 1.75 m (5 ft 9 in)
- Weight: 63 kg (139 lb)

Cycling career
- Sport: Cycling
- Discipline: Road
- Role: Rider
- Rider type: Climber

Professional teams
- 2011–2012: Gobernación de Antioquia–Indeportes Antioquia
- 2013: Jamis–Hagens Berman
- 2014–2015: Garmin–Sharp
- 2016: Team Jamis
- 2017–2018: UnitedHealthcare
- 2019: EPM

Janier Alexis Acevedo Calle (born 6 December 1985) is a Colombian professional road racing cyclist, who last rode for UCI Continental team EPM.

== Career ==
=== 2013 season ===
While riding for Jamis–Hagens Berman in 2013, he won a mountaintop finish on Stage 2 of the Tour of California, twelve seconds ahead of eventual overall winner, Tejay van Garderen of BMC Racing Team. He subsequently finished third overall in the Tour, and briefly wore the leader's jersey before van Garderen claimed it.

In September 2013, it was announced that Acevedo would move to the Omega Pharma–Quick-Step squad for the 2014 season. However, a month later, Acevedo was said to have broken a "verbal agreement" with Omega Pharma–Quick-Step, with the intention to join Garmin–Sharp instead.

== Major results ==
2009
1st Overall Vuelta Ciclista a Costa Rica

1st Stages 8 (ITT) & 10

2010
1st Stage 1 (TTT) Vuelta a Colombia
1st Stage 6 Vuelta a Guatemala
2011
1st Stage 3 (TTT) Vuelta a Colombia
1st Stage 4 Tour of Utah
8th Road race, Pan American Road Championships
2012
6th Overall Vuelta Mexico
2013
1st Overall 2012–13 UCI America Tour
3rd Overall Tour of Utah
3rd Overall Tour of California

1st Stage 2

4th Overall USA Pro Cycling Challenge

1st Stage 4

5th Overall Tour of the Gila

1st Stage 1

8th Overall Tour de San Luis
2014
9th Overall Tour of California
9th Overall Tour de Suisse
2015
4th GP Miguel Induráin
2016
3rd Overall Joe Martin Stage Race

1st Stage 1 (ITT)

4th Overall Tour of the Gila
8th Overall Tour de San Luis
