= Philip Deignan =

Irish road bicycle racer (born 1983)

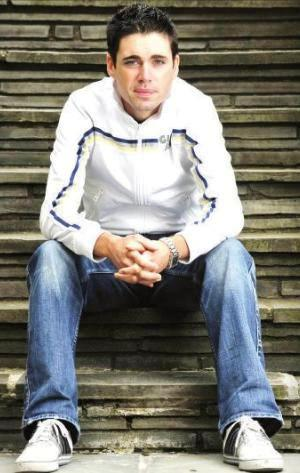

Personal information
- Full name: Philip Deignan
- Nicknames: Philly, Deigy, Lippy, Nando, Tony, Andrew
- Born: 7 September 1983 (age 43) Letterkenny, County Donegal, Ireland
- Height: 1.76 m (5 ft 9 in)
- Weight: 67 kg (148 lb)

Cycling career
- Sport: Cycling
- Current team: Retired
- Discipline: Road
- Role: Rider
- Rider type: Climbing domestique (retired)

Amateur team
- 2004: Vélo-Club La Pomme Marseille

Professional teams
- 2005–2008: AG2R Prévoyance
- 2009–2010: Cervélo TestTeam
- 2011: Team RadioShack
- 2012–2013: UnitedHealthcare
- 2014–2018: Team Sky

Major wins
- Grand Tours Vuelta a España 1 individual stage (2009) Stage races Tour of the Gila (2013)

Philip Deignan (Irish: Pilib Ó Duígeannáin; born 7 September 1983) is an Irish former professional road racing cyclist, who rode professionally between 2005 and 2018 for the Ag2r–La Mondiale, Cervélo TestTeam, Team RadioShack, UnitedHealthcare and Team Sky squads. A former Olympian, Deignan won a stage in the 2009 Vuelta a España, and finished in the top ten in the general classification.

== Career ==
=== Early career ===
Born in Letterkenny, County Donegal, Deignan first competed on a bike in 1997 during the annual Sligo to Letterkenny charity cycle. He attended St Eunan's College for his secondary education. Before turning professional in 2005, he rode for amateur club Vélo-Club La Pomme Marseille where he performed well.

In the Baby Giro of 2004 after recovering from an earlier crash, he performed well on the mountainous stages. He won the final stage and the general classification of the 2004 Ronde de l'Isard as an amateur. His first professional road race win was in the Tour du Doubs when he attacked a breakaway group that contained his fellow Irishman and teammate at the time Mark Scanlon. Other notable performances were ninth place in the UCI World Championships Under 23 road race, fifth place in European championship under 23 road race, and second place on a mountainous stage of the 2006 Tour de l'Avenir stage race.

After an injury-plagued early season, Deignan entered and finished his first grand tour with the 2007 Vuelta a España, where he finished prominently with 10th, 12th and 16th in several mountain stages.

He qualified to represent Ireland at the 2008 Beijing Olympics. He finished in 81st place (15 minutes and 53 seconds behind winner Samuel Sánchez and five minutes behind teammate Nicolas Roche) in the 150.2-mile (241.7-kilometre) road race on 9 August. Deignan along with Roche and Roger Aiken made up the Irish team for the 2008 World Championships in Varese on 28 September. None of the three finished the demanding 260-kilometre (160-mile) race.

=== Cervélo TestTeam (2009–2010) ===
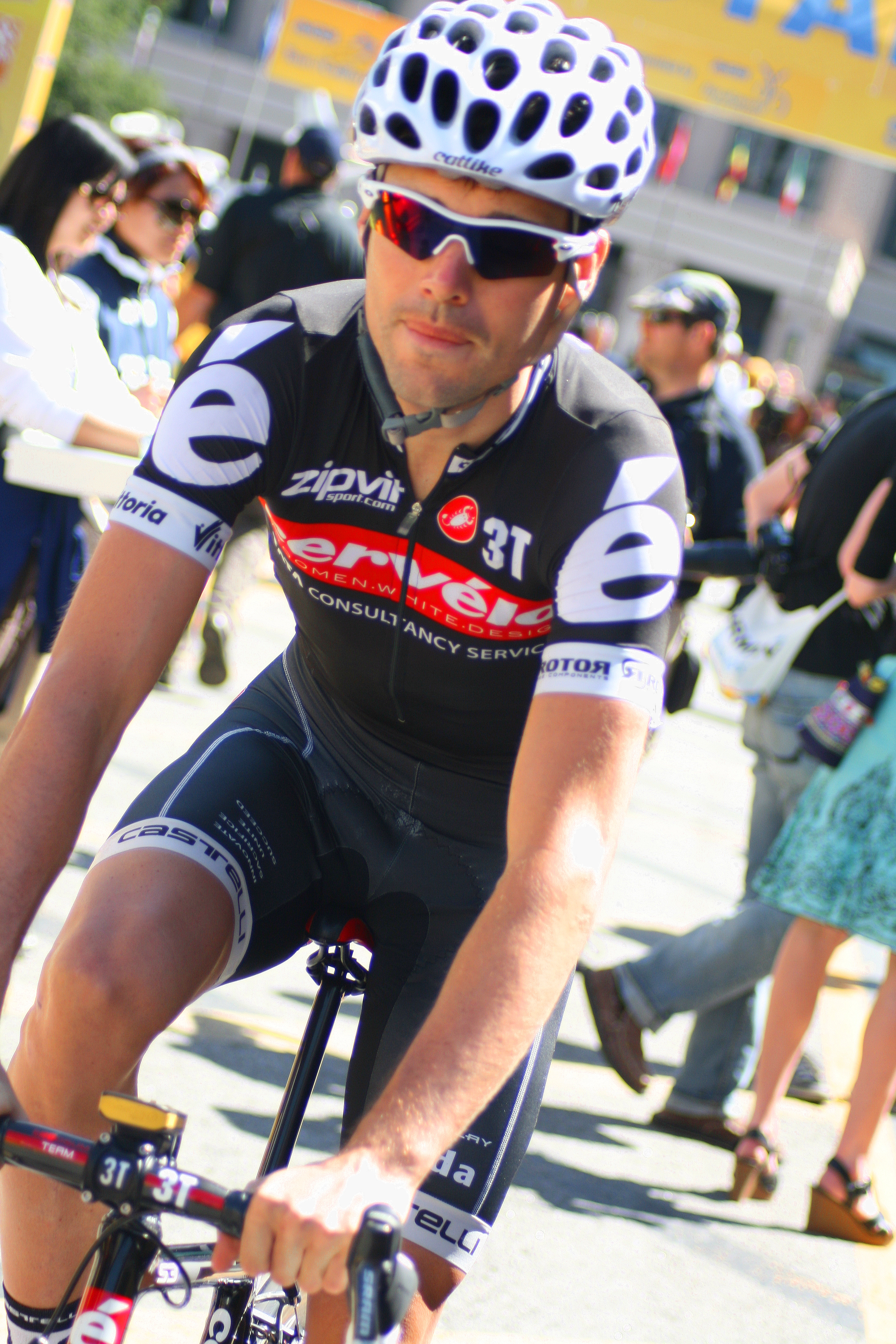
Deignan, riding for Cervélo TestTeam, at the 2010 Tour of California

For the 2009 season Deignan rode with the Cervélo TestTeam. He raced the Giro d'Italia, achieving a top ten finish in one stage and featuring prominently in others, with his team winning 4 stages in total. On 17 September 2009 he achieved his first grand tour stage victory, in stage 18 of the Vuelta a España into Avila, after a 2-man battle with the Czech Roman Kreuziger of Liquigas. By finishing 10 minutes clear of the peloton he climbed to 9th in the general classification. He became the first Irishman to win a stage on a Grand Tour since Stephen Roche's last-stage success at the Tour de France in 1992. Deignan was selected to ride for Ireland in the 2009 World Elite Road Race Championship in Mendrisio, Switzerland (23–27 September) alongside Nicolas Roche and Dan Martin. After his Vuelta performance, Deignan reached a personal high 2009 world ranking of 71st. Deignan was the best Irish finisher when placing 40th at the 2009 UCI Road World Championships – Men's road race in Mendrisio. He ended the 2009 season UCI ranked 75th, with 61 points, which helped Ireland to 16th in the team rankings.

=== RadioShack (2011) ===
It was announced after illness ruined his 2010 season, Deignan signed for Team RadioShack for 2011.

=== United Healthcare (2012–2013) ===
After one season with RadioShack, he signed on with UnitedHealthcare for the 2012 season. Deignan was able to rebuild his career with the US-based squad, winning the Tour of the Gila in 2013, and recording top ten overall finishes in the three biggest US stage races, the Tour of Utah (6th), the Tour of California (9th) and the USA Pro Cycling Challenge (10th).

=== Team Sky (2014–2018) ===
Subsequently, Deignan announced he was returning to the UCI World Tour in 2014 by joining Team Sky. He rode the Giro d'Italia which began in Belfast and travelled to Dublin in the opening stages. Deignan led Sky at the Tour de Pologne, finishing seventh overall. He also rode the Vuelta a España, where he helped Chris Froome to second overall.

In November 2018, Deignan announced his retirement from professional cycling.

== Personal life ==
Deignan married fellow professional road racing cyclist Lizzie Armitstead in Otley on 17 September 2016. The couple have two children: a daughter, born in September 2018, and a son, born in September 2022. He is a first cousin of Irish rower and indoor rowing champion Daniel Collins.

Deignan resides in Monaco.

== Major results ==
2004
1st Overall Ronde de l'Isard

1st Stages 2 & 5

National Road Championships

2nd Under-23 road race
4th Road race

6th Boucle de l'Artois
8th Liège–Bastogne–Liège U23
10th Paris–Mantes-en-Yvelines
2005
1st Tour du Doubs
5th Road race, UEC European Under-23 Road Championships
7th Overall Tour de la Région Wallonne
8th Overall Paris–Corrèze
9th Road race, UCI Under-23 Road World Championships
2009
7th Overall Vuelta a Castilla y León
8th Giro del Mendrisiotto
9th Overall Vuelta a España

1st Stage 18

10th Overall Vuelta a Burgos
2013
1st Overall Tour of the Gila

1st Mountains classification

2nd Overall Tour de Beauce
6th Overall Tour of Utah
9th Overall Tour of California
10th Overall USA Pro Cycling Challenge
2014
7th Overall Tour de Pologne
2015
5th Overall Tour de Yorkshire

=== Grand Tour general classification results timeline ===
Grand Tour	2007	2008	2009	2010	2011	2012	2013	2014	2015	2016	2017
Giro d'Italia	—	79	56	—	47	—	—	43	—	DNF	37
Tour de France	Did not contest during career										
Vuelta a España	71	—	9	DNF	—	—	—	39	—	—	—
