= Jakub Novák (Czech cyclist) =

Czech cyclist

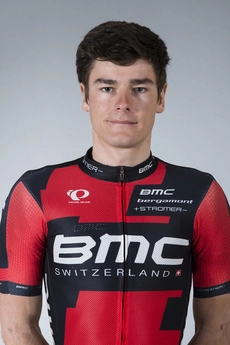

Personal information
- Born: 30 December 1990 (age 35) Pardubice, Czech Republic
- Height: 183 cm (6 ft 0 in)
- Weight: 71 kg (157 lb)

Cycling career
- Sport: Cycling
- Current team: Retired
- Discipline: Road
- Role: Rider
- Rider type: Time trialist

Amateur teams
- 2009–2010: SC Sergio Dalfiume
- 2011–2012: U.C. Trevigiani–Dynamon–Bottoli
- 2013–2014: BMC Development Team

Professional teams
- 2013: BMC Racing Team (stagiaire)
- 2015: AWT–GreenWay

Jakub Novák (born 30 December 1990 in Pardubice) is a performance cycling coach and retired Czech professional cyclist.

As a professional cyclist, Novák rode as a stagiaire for UCI WorldTeam BMC Racing Team in 2013. he participated five times in the UCI Road World Championships and became a three-time national under-23 champion.

As a performance coach, he led Alex Bogna to win Zwift Academy in 2021, getting him a contract with the Pro Team Alpecin–Deceuninck and with Alicia Dana winning a bronze medal at the 2020 Summer Paralympics Games in Tokyo.

== Major results ==
2008
7th Overall Po Stajerski
2010
1st Time trial, National Under-23 Road Championships
9th GP Capodarco
2011
1st Road race, National Under-23 Road Championships
1st Stage 6 Giro Ciclistico d'Italia
5th Time trial, European Under-23 Road Championships
2012
1st Time trial, National Under-23 Road Championships
2nd Overall Carpathia Couriers Path

1st Stage 4

3rd Trofeo Città di San Vendemiano
9th Time trial, European Under-23 Road Championships
2013
6th Chrono Champenois
6th Internationale Wielertrofee Jong Maar Moedig
7th Ronde Pévèloise
