= 2013 Tour of California =

UCI America Tour
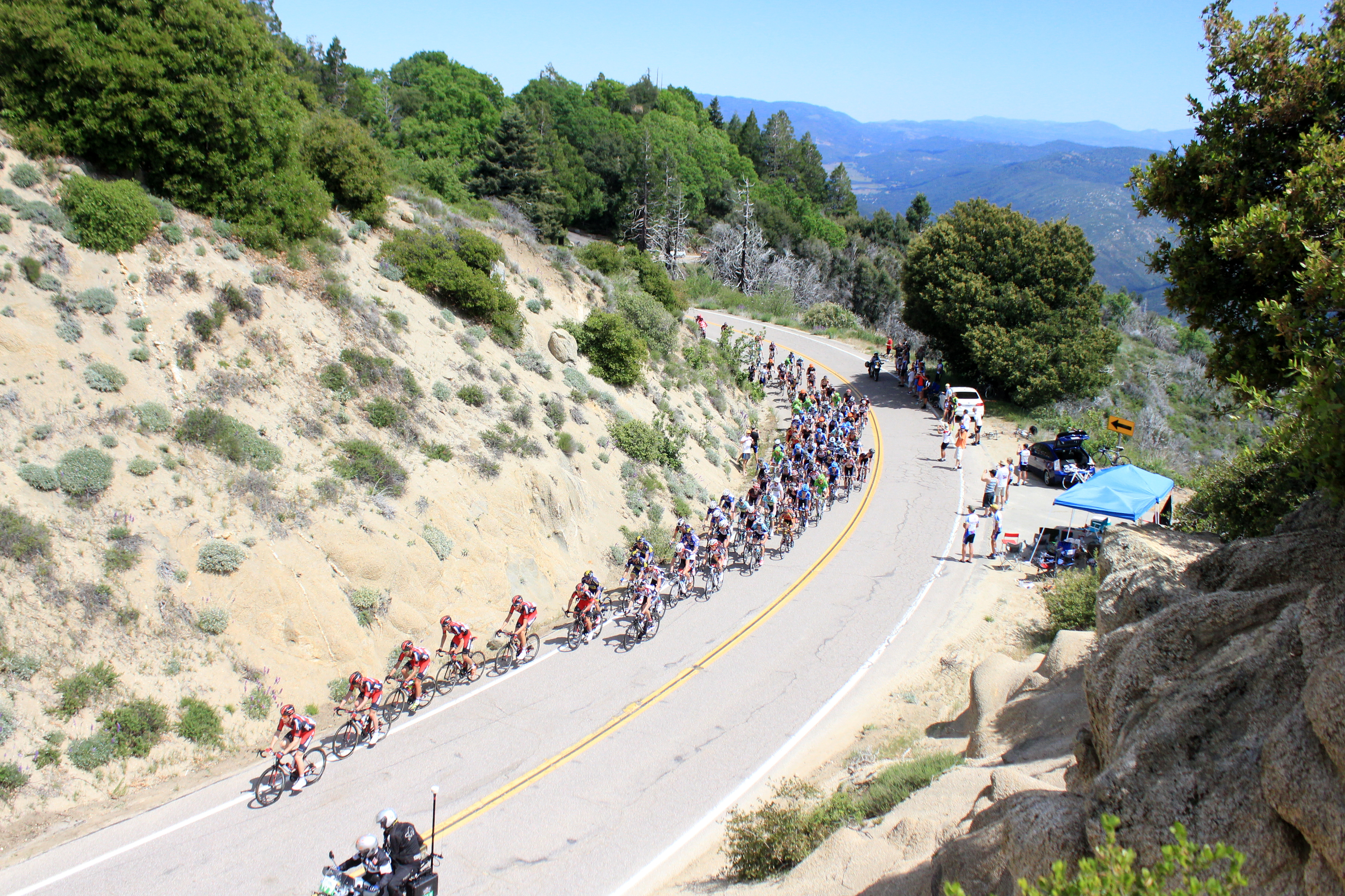

Race details
- Dates: May 12–19, 2013
- Stages: 8
- Distance: 729 mi (1,173 km)
- Winning time: 29h 43' 00"

Results
Jersey awarded to the overall winner	Winner	Tejay van Garderen (USA)	(BMC Racing Team)
	Second	Michael Rogers (AUS)	(Saxo–Tinkoff)
	Third	Janier Acevedo (COL)	(Jamis–Hagens Berman)
Jersey awarded to the mountains classification winner	Mountains	Carter Jones (USA)	(Bissell)
Jersey awarded to the youth classification winner	Youth	Lawson Craddock (USA)	(Bontrager Cycling Team)
Jersey awarded to the sprints classification winner	Sprints	Peter Sagan (SVK)	(Cannondale)
	Team	BMC Racing Team	

The 2013 Amgen Tour of California was the eighth running of the Tour of California cycling stage race. It was held from May 12–19, and was rated as a 2.HC event on the UCI America Tour. It began in Escondido and finished in Santa Rosa.

It was won by the American Tejay van Garderen (BMC Racing Team), the first success in the general classification of a stage race in the career of the then 24-year-old rider. The sprints jersey was handed to Slovak Peter Sagan (Cannondale), who won it for the fourth time in four consecutive presences at the Tour. Carter Jones (Bissell) prevailed in the mountains classification thanks to his participation in numerous breakaways, and Lawson Craddock of Bontrager Cycling Team earned the youth classification jersey at 21 years of age.

== Prior to the race ==
The winner of the 2012 race, Robert Gesink, did not participate in this edition as he was riding the Giro d'Italia. For this edition, the UCI elected to reintroduce blood testing based on the biological passport, as USADA would also take care of pre-race testing, but no cooperation was established between the two agencies. The favorites for the overall classification have been deemed to be Tejay van Garderen, Haimar Zubeldia, Cameron Meyer, Michael Rogers (who won the 2010 edition and was making a comeback to the race), Thomas De Gendt and Francisco Mancebo, among others. Another rider to watch was David Zabriskie, who finished second in the general classification of the race on four occasions including the latest edition, without ever winning the top honors.

Riders looking for stage wins in sprints included Slovak Peter Sagan (who held the record for stage wins in the Tour at eight going into the event), Belgian Gianni Meersman and Dutch Boy Van Poppel. Also in contention for stage honors were Aussie Michael Matthews, American Tyler Farrar and Belgian Philippe Gilbert. 2010 Tour de France winner Andy Schleck was also present.

== Participating teams ==
Sixteen teams participated in the 2013 Tour of California, including eight UCI World Tour teams, three UCI Professional Continental teams, and five UCI Continental teams. They were:

UCI ProTeams
- RadioShack–Leopard
- Garmin–Sharp
- Omega Pharma–Quick-Step
- BMC Racing Team
- Orica–GreenEDGE
- Cannondale
- Saxo–Tinkoff
- Vacansoleil–DCM
UCI Professional Continental Teams
- UnitedHealthcare
- Champion System
- NetApp–Endura
UCI Continental Teams
- Bissell
- Optum–Kelly Benefit Strategies
- Jamis–Hagens Berman
- Bontrager Cycling Team
- 5-hour Energy

== Schedule ==
List of stages
Stage	Date	Course	Distance	Type	Winner
1	May 12	Escondido to Escondido	165.1 km (103 mi)	Hilly stage	Lieuwe Westra (NED)
2	May 13	Murrieta to Greater Palm Springs	200 km (124 mi)	Hilly stage	Janier Acevedo (COL)
3	May 14	Palmdale to Santa Clarita	177.7 km (110 mi)	Hilly stage	Peter Sagan (SVK)
4	May 15	Santa Clarita to Santa Barbara	134.5 km (84 mi)	Hilly stage	Tyler Farrar (USA)
5	May 16	Santa Barbara to Avila Beach	186 km (116 mi)	Hilly stage	Jens Voigt (GER)
6	May 17	San Jose	31.9 km (20 mi)	Individual time trial	Tejay van Garderen (USA)
7	May 18	Livermore to Mount Diablo	147.1 km (91 mi)	Mountain stage	Leopold König (CZE)
8	May 19	San Francisco to Santa Rosa	130 km (81 mi)	Flat stage	Peter Sagan (SVK)
	Total		729 mi (1,173 km)		

== Stages ==
=== Stage 1 ===
The course was mountainous and included as a major obstacle the Category 1 Palomar Mountain climb about halfway through the stage, which took the riders to an altitude of about 5,200 ft (1,600 m). Other categorized difficulties were the Mesa Grande (cat. 4) situated before the latter climb and the Cole Grade (cat. 3), whose summit was situated 20 mi (32 km) from the finish. The only intermediate sprint was disputed in Ramona after 20 mi (32 km) of racing and before the difficulties of the day.

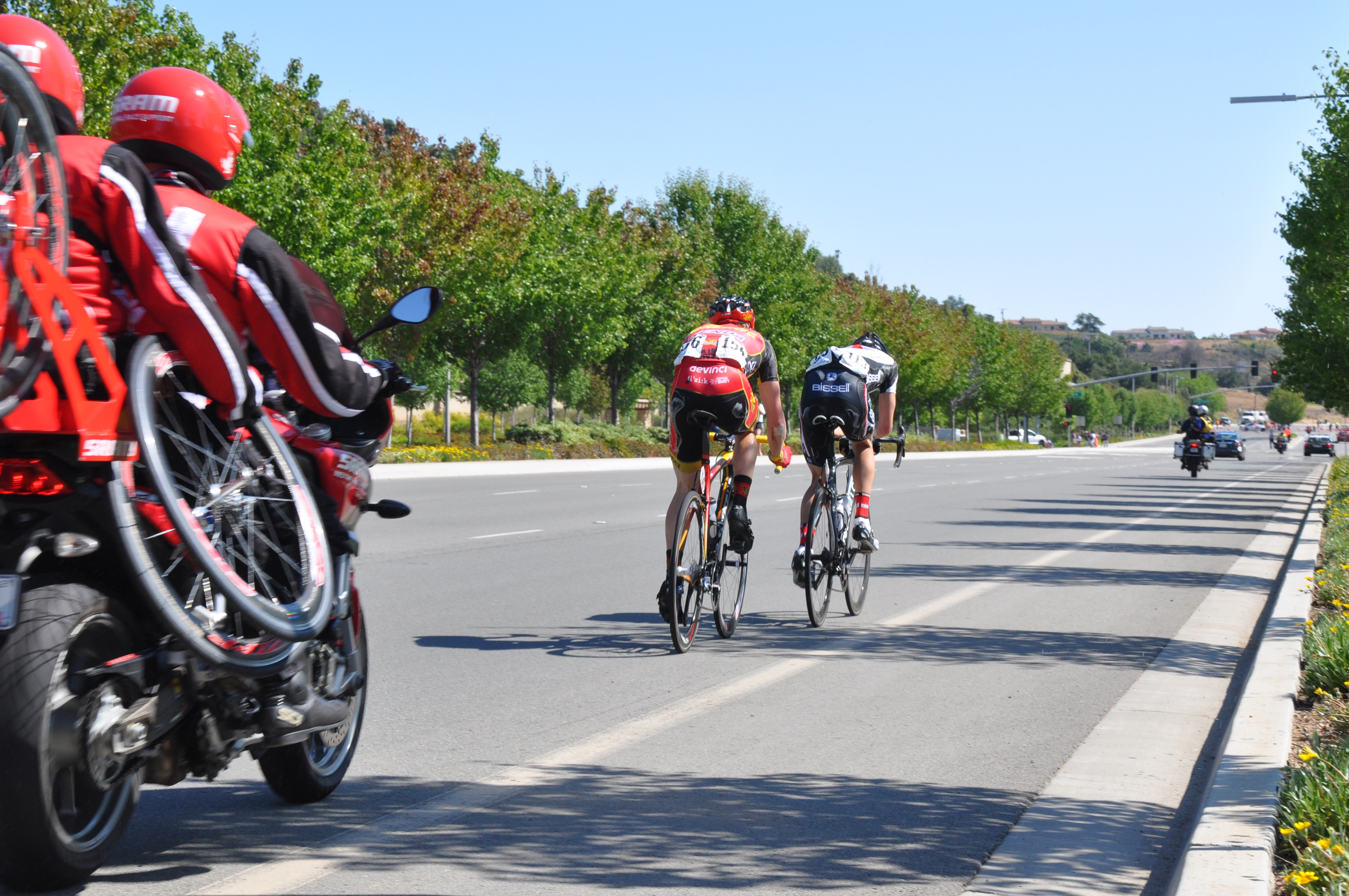
Lead riders Carter Jones (Bissell) and James Stemper (5-hour Energy) re-enter the city of Escondido.

One rider missed the start of the first stage, Ben King (RadioShack–Leopard) had to withdraw due to a hand injury suffered while training two days prior. The heat proved to be a factor in this stage, as it was reported temperatures reached over 100 °F (38 °C). Early in the race, a breakaway of four riders formed: Zak Dempster (NetApp–Endura), Marsh Cooper (Optum–Kelly Benefit Strategies), James Stemper (5-hour Energy), and Carter Jones (Bissell). The quartet built a maximum lead of ten minutes, Jones grabbed the intermediate sprint points, and Dempster was first atop the Mesa Grande (cat. 4). The latter was dropped on the slopes of Palomar Mountain, a ten mile long challenge featuring a 4,5% average slope, which Jones crested first. The leading group, now reduced to a trio, cooperated on the twisting descent and on the flatter sections afterward, until they tackled the last categorized difficulty, the Cole Grade. The Canadian Marsh Cooper was unable to follow the pace on the short but steep climb, as Stemper and Jones powered away. The duet held a sizable lead, and it looked like they might hold the peloton at bay but BMC Racing Team, Cannondale, Saxo–Tinkoff and Vacansoleil–DCM took matters into their own hands and started to reel the escape in gradually.

Peter Sagan (Cannondale) was dropped on the Cole Grade, but some teammates folded back to help him reintegrate the main group, which he did. In the run-in to Escondido, world champion Philippe Gilbert (BMC Racing Team) was distanced, and Luis Amaran of Jamis–Hagens Berman took a nasty spill, but was able to remount and finish the stage. Jones and Stemper were finally caught with 5 km (3.1 mi) to go. As the two shook hands to congratulate each other for the big effort, Lieuwe Westra (Vacansoleil–DCM) jumped out of the peloton, and was joined by Francisco Mancebo (5-hour Energy). Sagan then had problems with his rear derailleur and was soon relegated to the back of the peloton, where he sorted out the problem without leaving the saddle. The Mancebo-Westra duo cooperated well, taking advantage of the sprinters' teams confusion, and managed to resist. Westra outsprinted Mancebo to take Vacansoleil–DCM's second win of the year and the 10 seconds bonification. Sagan won the sprint of the bunch, coming in six seconds after the escapees. Thanks to their long escape, Jones earned the mountains classification jersey while his fellow escapee Stemper won the "Most Courageous" rider jersey.

Stage 1 result

	Rider	Team	Time
1	Lieuwe Westra (NED)	Vacansoleil–DCM	4h 31' 33"
2	Francisco Mancebo (ESP)	5-hour Energy	+ 0"
3	Peter Sagan (SVK)	Cannondale	+ 6"
4	Gianni Meersman (BEL)	Omega Pharma–Quick-Step	+ 6"
5	Jasper Stuyven (BEL)	Bontrager Cycling Team	+ 6"
6	Jacob Rathe (USA)	Garmin–Sharp	+ 6"
7	Alex Candelario (USA)	Optum–Kelly Benefit Strategies	+ 6"
8	Mitchell Docker (AUS)	Orica–GreenEDGE	+ 6"
9	Jeremy Vennell (NZL)	Bissell	+ 6"
10	Tanner Putt (USA)	Bontrager Cycling Team	+ 6"

General Classification after Stage 1

	Rider	Team	Time
1	Lieuwe Westra (NED)	Vacansoleil–DCM	4h 31' 23"
2	Francisco Mancebo (ESP)	5-hour Energy	+ 4"
3	Peter Sagan (SVK)	Cannondale	+ 12"
4	Carter Jones (USA)	Bissell	+ 13"
5	James Stemper (USA)	5-hour Energy	+ 14"
6	Gianni Meersman (BEL)	Omega Pharma–Quick-Step	+ 16"
7	Jasper Stuyven (BEL)	Bontrager Cycling Team	+ 16"
8	Jacob Rathe (USA)	Garmin–Sharp	+ 16"
9	Alex Candelario (USA)	Optum–Kelly Benefit Strategies	+ 16"
10	Mitchell Docker (AUS)	Orica–GreenEDGE	+ 16"

=== Stage 2 ===
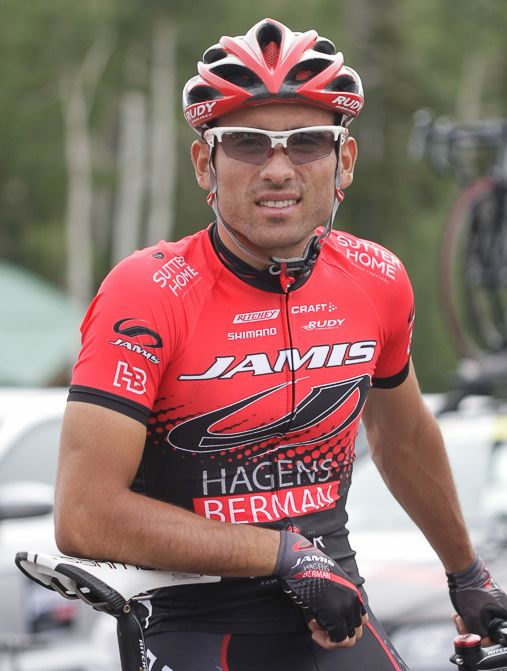
Stage winner Acevedo, pictured here in 2013 at the Tour of Utah, sporting the Jamis–Hagens Berman's colors.

Stage 2 was another very hilly affair with a sprint counting toward the points classification jersey in Hemet after a little more than 40 mi (64 km), before the climbing began. Once again the highest point of the course was situated midway through the race atop the Category 1 Mountain Center climb, which translated to a 1,000 m (3,300 ft) gain in altitude. Another intermediate sprint was located at the foot of the descent, then the road went flat until the final ascent to the finish in the vicinity of Palm Springs, which was also a Category 1 affair.

The heat was once again a major factor in the race, as the temperatures reached 42 °C (108 °F) and nearly 120 degrees on the pavement. Afterwards, riders tweeted pictures of blisters from burns on their bodies from lying on the black pavement after the stage. The riders kept themselves cool with ice packs taken from the team cars, tucking them in their jerseys as they were racing through the desert landscape. The day's early breakaway included Bissell's Pat McCarty, Ben Jacques-Maynes (Jamis–Hagens Berman), Scott Zwizanski (Optum–Kelly Benefit Strategies) and Sylvain Chavanel (Omega Pharma–Quick-Step). McCarty was the better placed rider in the overall classification at only 16 seconds, which hindered the break's chances greatly. Nevertheless, they held a maximum lead of twelve minutes over the bunch. McCarty took the first intermediate sprint points. The gap started melting when they crested Mountain Center as Jacques-Maynes took the maximum King of the Mountains points. They negotiated the twisting descent to Palm Springs, passing through the last intermediate sprint without contesting it (Zwizanski happened to be at the front). Back in the peloton, race leader Lieuwe Westra suffered a flat tire, but was able to negotiate his way back to the main field by weaving through the team cars.

With 25 km (16 mi) to cover and a gap of three minutes, disagreement started to appear in the lead group as Zwizanski placed an acceleration, followed by a dig from Jacques-Maynes, who spent two kilometers alone in front before the quartet got back together. At the foot of the final climb with 6 km (3.7 mi) to the finish, the escapees were finally caught. The ascent was officially 6.4 km (4.0 mi) long at an average gradient of 10%. The peloton started breaking rapidly thanks to the very steep gradient. Lieuwe Westra (Vacansoleil–DCM) was soon distanced, and lost more than 9 minutes and the yellow jersey, finishing near pre-race favorites, Andy Schleck (RadioShack–Leopard) and David Zabriskie (Garmin–Sharp). Up the road, Philip Deignan of UnitedHealthcare attacked the leading group of five riders and hung in front for 2 km (1.2 mi), but was swept back by Tejay van Garderen (BMC Racing Team) and Janier Acevedo (Jamis–Hagens Berman), who went under the flamme rouge in the lead. Acevedo put a last acceleration in and distanced Van Garderen, earning the biggest victory of his career so far and taking the leader's jersey. For his efforts in the break, Chavanel earned the "Most Courageous" rider award.

Stage 2 result

	Rider	Team	Time
1	Janier Acevedo (COL)	Jamis–Hagens Berman	5h 07' 40"
2	Tejay van Garderen (USA)	BMC Racing Team	+ 12"
3	Philip Deignan (IRL)	UnitedHealthcare	+ 27"
4	Mathias Frank (SWI)	BMC Racing Team	+ 45"
5	Michael Rogers (AUS)	Saxo–Tinkoff	+ 55"
6	Chad Haga (USA)	Optum–Kelly Benefit Strategies	+ 1' 13"
7	Matthew Busche (USA)	RadioShack–Leopard	+ 1' 15"
8	Francisco Mancebo (ESP)	5-hour Energy	+ 1' 15"
9	Lawson Craddock (USA)	Bontrager Cycling Team	+ 1' 32"
10	Cameron Meyer (AUS)	Orica–GreenEDGE	+ 1' 40"

General Classification after Stage 2

	Rider	Team	Time
1	Janier Acevedo (COL)	Jamis–Hagens Berman	9h 39' 19"
2	Tejay van Garderen (USA)	BMC Racing Team	+ 12"
3	Philip Deignan (IRL)	UnitedHealthcare	+ 27"
4	Mathias Frank (SWI)	BMC Racing Team	+ 45"
5	Michael Rogers (AUS)	Saxo–Tinkoff	+ 55"
6	Francisco Mancebo (ESP)	5-hour Energy	+ 1' 03"
7	Chad Haga (USA)	Optum–Kelly Benefit Strategies	+ 1' 13"
8	Matthew Busche (USA)	RadioShack–Leopard	+ 1' 15"
9	Lawson Craddock (USA)	Bontrager Cycling Team	+ 1' 32"
10	Cameron Meyer (AUS)	Orica–GreenEDGE	+ 1' 40"

=== Stage 3 ===
Stage 3 was composed of numerous Category 4 climbs as opposed to the two prior stages which included one or two major difficulties. The first one was situated on Munz Ranch road, the following two occurred on Lake Hughes Road, after which two intermediate sprints were disputed; one near Lake Hughes and another one in the Leona Valley. The last categorized bump was on the Bouquet Canyon Road, 22 mi (35 km) from the finish line which was reached via mostly downhill roads in Santa Clarita.

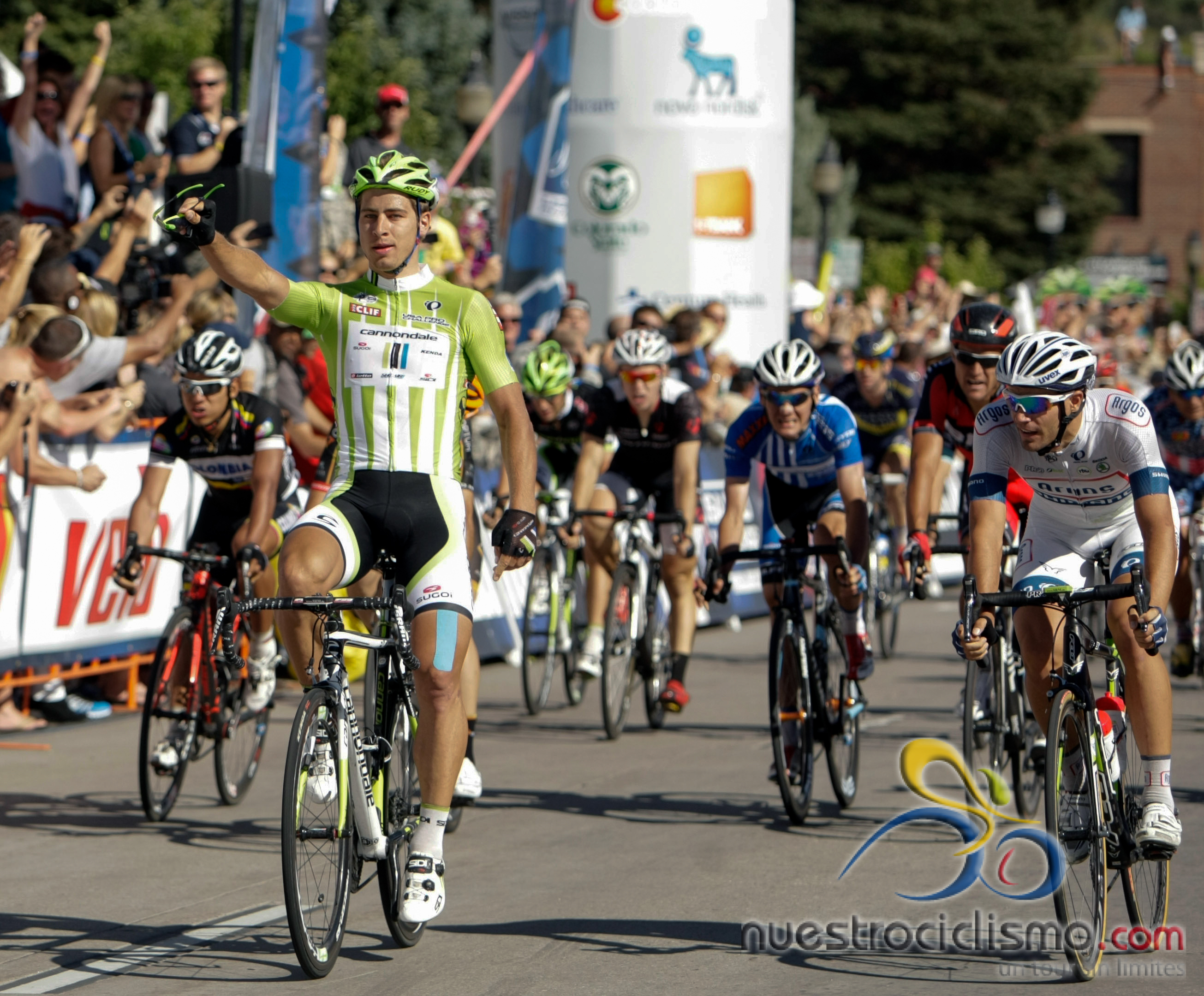
Peter Sagan is pictured here at the 2013 USA Pro Cycling Challenge.

The temperatures were a lot more favorable to the riders on Stage 3. 41-year-old Jens Voigt (RadioShack–Leopard) attacked right as the flag was dropped and a 23 men breakaway formed. The large group stayed free for 30 kilometres (19 mi) until the first categorized climb, as they were reeled back in by the leader's team, Jamis–Hagens Berman. Carter Jones (Bissell) took the KOM points, securing the mountains classification jersey for another day. At the same moment, another attempt at forming an escape succeeded: Andy Schleck (RadioShack–Leopard), Gavin Mannion (Bontrager Cycling Team), Chad Beyer (Champion System) and points classification leader Lieuwe Westra (Vacansoleil–DCM) steered clear of the bunch. The gap maximized at 4:45, Beyer took the 2 following King Of the Mountains contests, and the quartet did not contest the intermediate sprints, leaving the points to Westra, who wanted to comfort his lead for the Green Jersey. Schleck took maximum points on the last climb of the day, and the peloton started chasing harder, led by Garmin–Sharp, Cannondale and Omega Pharma–Quick-Step. Mannion sat up during the descent to reintegrate the main field, and with 20 kilometres (12 mi) to cover and a slight gap of 45 seconds, Schleck and Westra decided to call it quit and chat before the inevitable junction. Beyer had other ideas, soldiered onward and was caught shortly. This last effort netted him the "Most Courageous" rider jersey.

As the quasi-totality of the remaining peloton in the Tour came charging in Santa Clarita, the lead-out trains tried to sort themselves out. The only attack in the final came in the form of Markel Irizar (RadioShack–Leopard), who rolled the dice with 6 km (3.7 mi) to go, but the maneuver failed as he spent less than a minute at the front. In the final dash for the line, no lead-out trains stood out and Peter Sagan (Cannondale) seemed distanced until his lead-out man Guillaume Boivin found him and pulled, and at the same time Baden Cooke was leading out Michael Matthews for Orica–GreenEDGE. As the sprint was unleashed, Sagan was still behind the first row, but managed to find an opening on the right side of the road to beat Matthews by half-a-wheel. This was the ninth victory at the Tour of California for Sagan, who improved his own record.

Stage 3 result

	Rider	Team	Time
1	Peter Sagan (SVK)	Cannondale	4h 20' 31"
2	Michael Matthews (AUS)	Orica–GreenEDGE	+ 0"
3	Tyler Farrar (USA)	Garmin–Sharp	+ 0"
4	Gianni Meersman (BEL)	Omega Pharma–Quick-Step	+ 0"
5	Boy van Poppel (NED)	Vacansoleil–DCM	+ 0"
6	Thor Hushovd (NOR)	BMC Racing Team	+ 0"
7	Alex Candelario (USA)	Optum–Kelly Benefit Strategies	+ 0"
8	Sylvain Chavanel (FRA)	Omega Pharma–Quick-Step	+ 0"
9	Zak Dempster (AUS)	NetApp–Endura	+ 0"
10	Michael Mørkøv (DEN)	Saxo–Tinkoff	+ 0"

General Classification after Stage 3

	Rider	Team	Time
1	Janier Acevedo (COL)	Jamis–Hagens Berman	13h 59' 50"
2	Tejay van Garderen (USA)	BMC Racing Team	+ 12"
3	Philip Deignan (IRL)	UnitedHealthcare	+ 27"
4	Mathias Frank (SWI)	BMC Racing Team	+ 45"
5	Michael Rogers (AUS)	Saxo–Tinkoff	+ 55"
6	Francisco Mancebo (ESP)	5-hour Energy	+ 1' 03"
7	Chad Haga (USA)	Optum–Kelly Benefit Strategies	+ 1' 13"
8	Matthew Busche (USA)	RadioShack–Leopard	+ 1' 15"
9	Lawson Craddock (USA)	Bontrager Cycling Team	+ 1' 32"
10	Cameron Meyer (AUS)	Orica–GreenEDGE	+ 1' 40"

=== Stage 4 ===
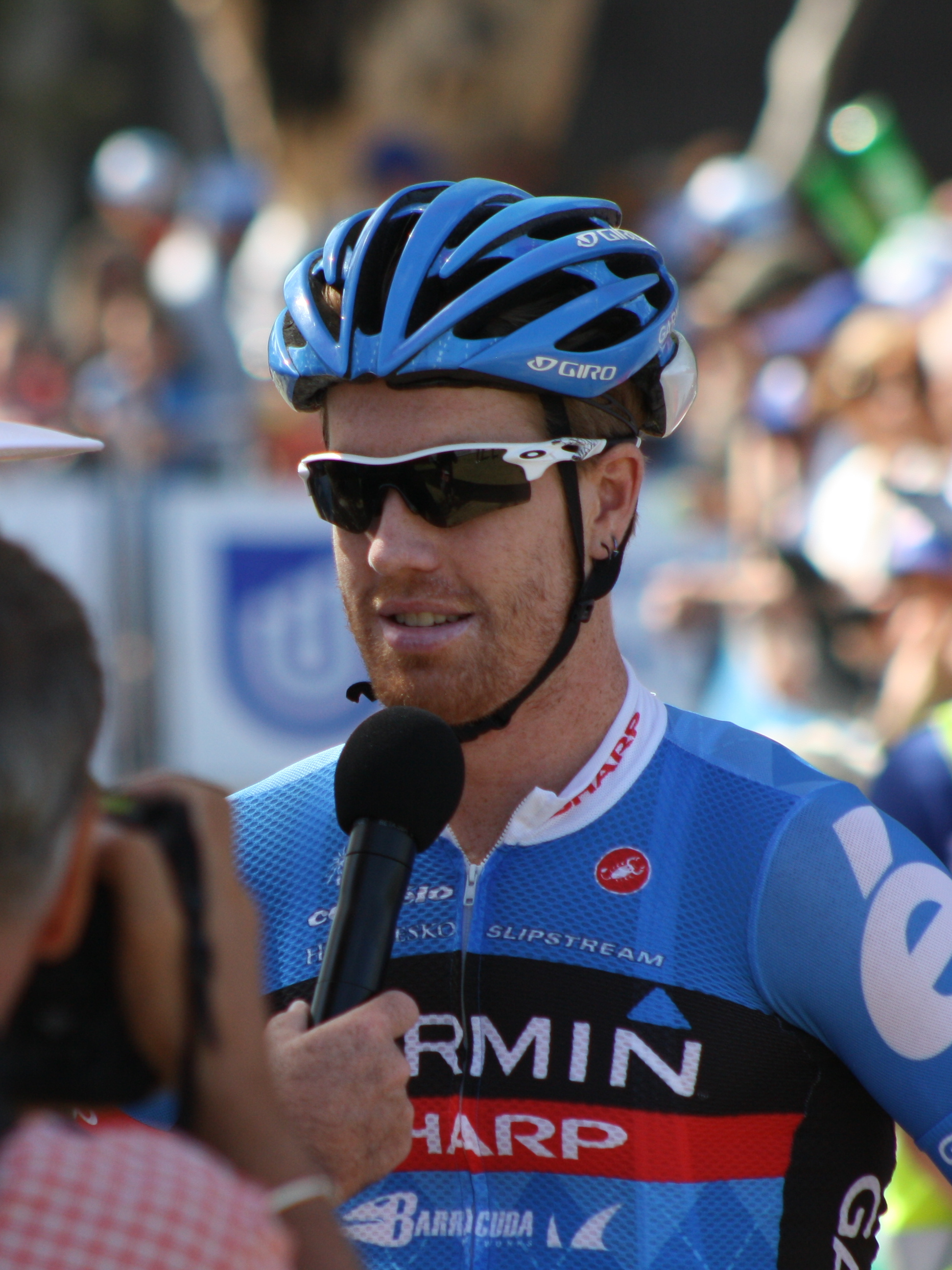
Tyler Farrar, the stage winner, talks to a reporter at the 2013 Tour Down Under.

The stage started with a very long 35 mi (56 km) downhill false-flat at the bottom of which an intermediate sprint was disputed in Santa Paula. Immediately after the sprint, the road kicked up to the Category 4 Dennison Grade. The latter climb was featured at the midway point of the stage once again. Another intermediate sprint was scheduled on the way down, followed by a Category 3 difficulty situated about 20 mi (32 km) from the line. Then the route was mainly flat or downhill.

A notable non-starter for the fourth stage was Philippe Gilbert (BMC Racing Team), who packed his bags since his wife was delivering their baby a little sooner than expected. A flurry of attacks punctuated the first 15 km (9.3 mi) until a move of 5 Americans and a Canadian formed, Nathan Brown (Bontrager Cycling Team), Frank Pipp (Bissell), the previous day's "Most Courageous" rider Chad Beyer (Champion System), James Stemper (5-hour Energy), Chris Baldwin (Bissell) and Canadian Marsh Cooper (Optum–Kelly Benefit Strategies). Baldwin was the better placed rider in the overall, 3:19 down on race leader Janier Acevedo (Team Jamis), and became the virtual leader at one point as the gap culminated to 3:30. Stemper won the first intermediate sprint in Santa Paula, as Baldwin was first to cross the line of the Category 4 Dennison Grade and at the intermediate sprint after the descent in Ojai. The 21-year-old Brown was aggressive on the last climb of the day, breaking away to take maximum points, and the group reformed on the descent.

A small bump up during the descent shed Pipp off the group, as the breakaway held an advantage of a minute with 30 km (19 mi) to cover. Some attacks occurred in the breakaway, the most significant being led by Brown, who sped away solo with 18 km (11 mi) as the break was about to be caught, and increased his lead to 40 seconds until a dig initiated by Jens Voigt (RadioShack–Leopard) brought the main field together at the 10 km (6.2 mi) to go banner. Brown gained the privilege to wear the "Most Courageous" rider jersey on the next stage for this last-ditch effort. Another significant attack happened with 2 km (1.2 mi) to race as the bunch negotiated a weirdly shaped roundabout, with Matt Brammeier (Champion System) taking the least traveled path and holding on until he got caught at the flamme rouge. As the sprint unfolded, Tyler Farrar was well positioned at the front, and powered away with Ken Hanson (Optum–Kelly Benefit Strategies) coming in second. This was Farrar's first win since the USA Pro Cycling Challenge last summer, and the second win of the day for Garmin–Sharp, as Ramūnas Navardauskas won the Giro d'Italia's stage 11 hours earlier. There were no changes in the overall classification, but the Green jersey changed hands and went to Peter Sagan, who finished fifth.

Stage 4 result

	Rider	Team	Time
1	Tyler Farrar (USA)	Garmin–Sharp	3h 14' 09"
2	Ken Hanson (USA)	Optum–Kelly Benefit Strategies	+ 0"
3	Gianni Meersman (BEL)	Omega Pharma–Quick-Step	+ 0"
4	Kris Boeckmans (BEL)	Vacansoleil–DCM	+ 0"
5	Peter Sagan (SVK)	Cannondale	+ 0"
6	Michael Matthews (AUS)	Orica–GreenEDGE	+ 0"
7	Thor Hushovd (NOR)	BMC Racing Team	+ 0"
8	Sylvain Chavanel (FRA)	Omega Pharma–Quick-Step	+ 0"
9	Jeremy Vennell (NZL)	Bissell	+ 0"
10	Jasper Stuyven (BEL)	Bontrager Cycling Team	+ 0"

General Classification after Stage 4

	Rider	Team	Time
1	Janier Acevedo (COL)	Jamis–Hagens Berman	17h 14' 26"
2	Tejay van Garderen (USA)	BMC Racing Team	+ 12"
3	Philip Deignan (IRL)	UnitedHealthcare	+ 27"
4	Mathias Frank (SWI)	BMC Racing Team	+ 45"
5	Michael Rogers (AUS)	Saxo–Tinkoff	+ 55"
6	Francisco Mancebo (ESP)	5-hour Energy	+ 1' 03"
7	Chad Haga (USA)	Optum–Kelly Benefit Strategies	+ 1' 13"
8	Matthew Busche (USA)	RadioShack–Leopard	+ 1' 15"
9	Lawson Craddock (USA)	Bontrager Cycling Team	+ 1' 32"
10	Cameron Meyer (AUS)	Orica–GreenEDGE	+ 1' 40"

=== Stage 5 ===
Stage 5 counted only one categorized climb, which was disputed at the beginning of the race, the San Marcos Pass which was graded as a Category 2 and whose summit was situated at the 20 mi (32 km) mark. From that point, the terrain was undulating or flat and passed through 3 intermediate sprints situated in Orcutt, Guadalupe and then Arroyo Grande.

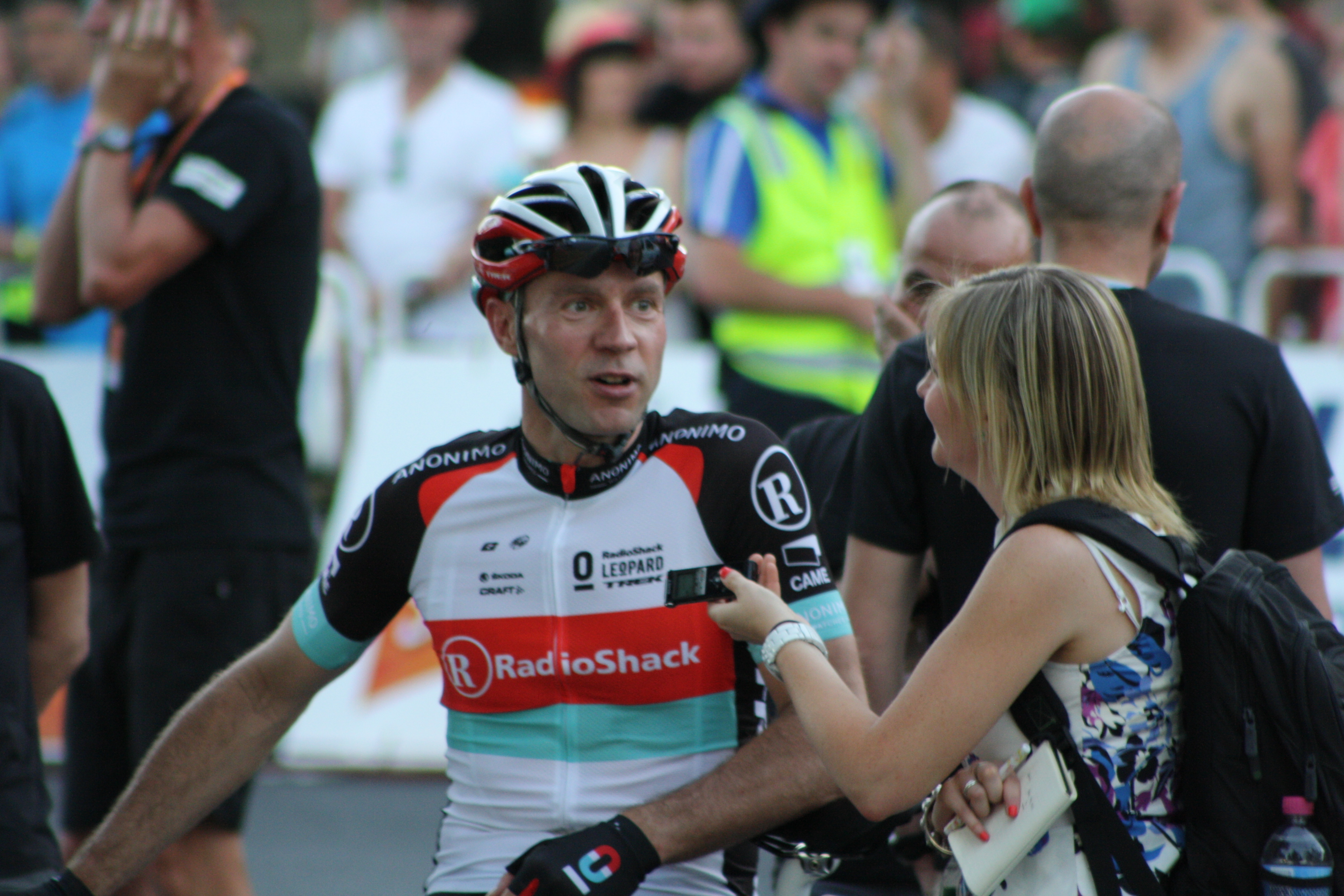
Jens Voigt was opportunistic during that stage and took the victory. Pictured, he is being interviewed at the 2013 People's Choice Classic.

The stage was deemed to be a sprinters' affair due to the fairly flat terrain after the Category 2 San Marcos Pass, and the early breakaway detached themselves before the difficulty: Thomas De Gendt (Vacansoleil–DCM), Kai Chun Feng (Champion System) and mountains classification leader Carter Jones (Bissell). Jones added valuable points to his tally as he crested the San Marcos Pass in first position. The three escapees enjoyed a maximum freedom of 8:30 before the bunch decided it was enough and started working. With 55 kilometres (34 mi) to cover and with the break still enjoying an advantage of two minutes, the crosswinds were battering the peloton in the open fields and RadioShack–Leopard, notably Jens Voigt, put a dig at the front that splintered the field in numerous groups. Soon, Saxo–Tinkoff, BMC Racing Team and Orica–GreenEDGE contributed to help the first echelon take large. The early break was caught then quickly shed off the back as Tejay van Garderen, Michael Rogers Cameron Meyer and Matthew Busche were in the lead group, all of them well-placed general classification contenders. Peter Sagan was also in the escape, isolated as he had no teammates with him. The group clawed its way to a steady growth of their advantage. Caught in the main group at the back were race leader Janier Acevedo (Jamis–Hagens Berman), third placed Philip Deignan (UnitedHealthcare), Chad Haga (seventh, Optum–Kelly Benefit Strategies) and Lawson Craddock (ninth, Bontrager Cycling Team).

The chase was mostly led by UnitedHealthcare while Jamis–Hagens Berman also chipped in. As the lead group continued to gain time, Busche told his teammate Voigt "you look pretty good, why don't you go for the stage?". Voigt did exactly that and with 5 kilometres (3.1 mi) to race until the finish line he launched an attack that would not be nullified. He crossed the line in Avila Beach solo, registering his first victory of the year. The large group of escapees he was part of came in 6 seconds later, and the whole peloton a minute and seven seconds in arrears. The general classification was reshuffled, with Van Garderen taking the lead from Acevedo and Michael Rogers going from fifth to second. 41-year-old veteran Voigt said in his typical good humored fashion when interviewed after his victory: "I just did the same move I've been doing since the ice age, and I couldn't believe they let me go. Once I get 20 seconds, I'm gone. I looked back and said, 'I can't believe they're giving me 20 seconds, don't they know?'

Stage 5 result

	Rider	Team	Time
1	Jens Voigt (GER)	RadioShack–Leopard	4h 41' 16"
2	Tyler Farrar (USA)	Garmin–Sharp	+ 6"
3	Thor Hushovd (NOR)	BMC Racing Team	+ 6"
4	Peter Sagan (SVK)	Cannondale	+ 6"
5	Michael Matthews (AUS)	Orica–GreenEDGE	+ 6"
6	Jay McCarthy (AUS)	Saxo–Tinkoff	+ 6"
7	Alex Candelario (USA)	Optum–Kelly Benefit Strategies	+ 6"
8	Michael Rogers (AUS)	Saxo–Tinkoff	+ 6"
9	Markel Irizar (ESP)	RadioShack–Leopard	+ 6"
10	Tejay van Garderen (USA)	BMC Racing Team	+ 6"

General Classification after Stage 5

	Rider	Team	Time
1	Tejay van Garderen (USA)	BMC Racing Team	21h 55' 32"
2	Michael Rogers (AUS)	Saxo–Tinkoff	+ 42"
3	Janier Acevedo (COL)	Jamis–Hagens Berman	+ 50"
4	Matthew Busche (USA)	RadioShack–Leopard	+ 1' 04"
5	Philip Deignan (IRL)	UnitedHealthcare	+ 1' 17"
6	Cameron Meyer (AUS)	Orica–GreenEDGE	+ 1' 29"
7	Mathias Frank (SWI)	BMC Racing Team	+ 1' 35"
8	Francisco Mancebo (ESP)	5-hour Energy	+ 1' 53"
9	Chad Haga (USA)	Optum–Kelly Benefit Strategies	+ 2' 03"
10	Lawson Craddock (USA)	Bontrager Cycling Team	+ 2' 22"

=== Stage 6 ===
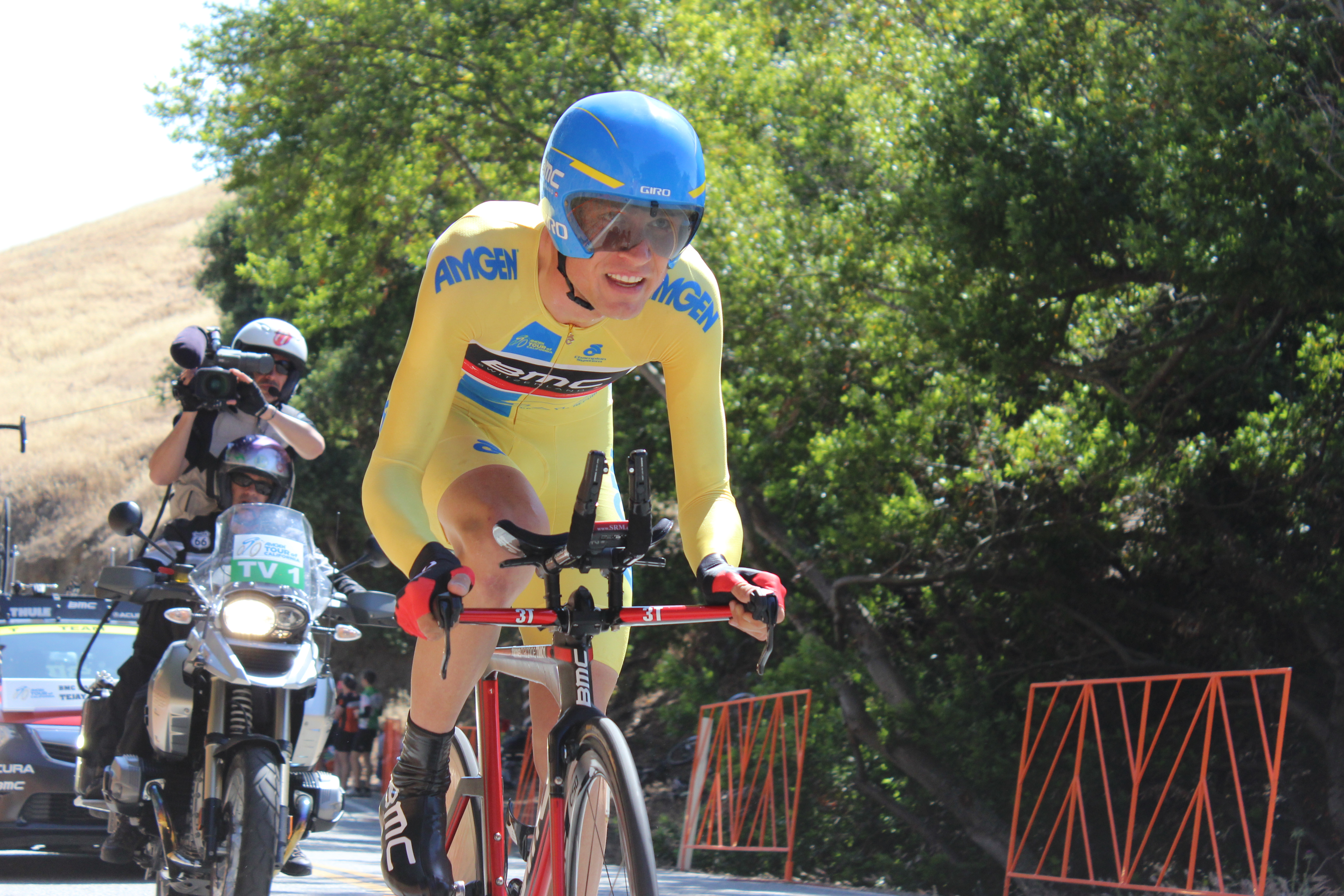
BMC Racing Team's Tejay van Garderen won the stage to extend his lead in the general classification.

The individual time trial stage started with a small climb coming 1 mi (1.6 km) after the starting ramp, then became mostly flat until the final 1.6 mi (2.6 km). From that point it kicked up for an elevation gain of almost 1,000 ft (300 m), featuring some sections at a gradient of 10%.

A notable rider could not start the stage, David Zabriskie (Garmin–Sharp) crashed during a reconnaissance ride and had to abandon. A choice faced the riders as they devised their strategy for the time trial: should they lose time at the foot of the final climb to switch to a normal road bike or power through with their aerodynamic machine not suited for steep climbing? The choices differed, as Michael Rogers opted for a change, while Tejay van Garderen (BMC Racing Team) continued on the TT bike. Kristijan Koren (Cannondale) was the first rider to complete the course under the 51 minutes bar, but then Rohan Dennis (Garmin–Sharp) exploded that time with a chrono of 49 minutes 20 seconds. Frenchman Sylvain Chavanel (Omega Pharma–Quick-Step) then scored an honorable time, a little more than a minute in arrears of Dennis. Overall contenders who lost time on the last day's echelon, Lawson Craddock (Bontrager Cycling Team), Chad Haga (Optum–Kelly Benefit Strategies), Philip Deignan (UnitedHealthcare) and Francisco Mancebo (5-hour Energy) all performed well enough to keep their top ten overall placings.

Meanwhile, former leader Janier Acevedo suffered a mechanical which forced him to change machines, he would ultimately finish 18th, 2:41 behind the winner. First stage winner Lieuwe Westra (Vacansoleil–DCM) then bested Dennis' time by 5 seconds, establishing a new mark. Philip Deignan (UnitedHealthcare) rode his way to 24th, a time that would make him lose 3 spots, from fifth to eighth. Cameron Meyer (Orica–GreenEDGE) put in a good performance with a time of 50' 20", which translated in a jump from sixth place to third. Michael Rogers (Saxo–Tinkoff) then signed what would become the fourth fastest time of the day, saying afterward that the wind played a big role. Being the overall classification leader, Van Garderen rolled off the ramp last, and confirmed his overall ambitions by crushing the stage, registering the only time below 49 minutes (48' 52", 22 seconds faster than Westra). It was Van Garderen's first victory of the year despite some notable results earlier in the season and he declared after the event: "I don't want to count my chickens before they hatch, but I'm ready to win, and I think it's about time. I think now I’m finally mature enough to pull through to the end. I think I’m ready to do it."

Stage 6 result

	Rider	Team	Time
1	Tejay van Garderen (USA)	BMC Racing Team	48' 52"
2	Lieuwe Westra (NED)	Vacansoleil–DCM	+ 22"
3	Rohan Dennis (AUS)	Garmin–Sharp	+ 27"
4	Michael Rogers (AUS)	Saxo–Tinkoff	+ 1' 05"
5	Marco Pinotti (ITA)	BMC Racing Team	+ 1' 08"
6	Cameron Meyer (AUS)	Orica–GreenEDGE	+ 1' 27"
7	Bob Jungels (LUX)	RadioShack–Leopard	+ 1' 28"
8	Leopold König (CZE)	NetApp–Endura	+ 1' 43"
9	Mathias Frank (SUI)	BMC Racing Team	+ 1' 45"
10	Sylvain Chavanel (FRA)	Omega Pharma–Quick-Step	+ 1' 48"

General Classification after Stage 6

	Rider	Team	Time
1	Tejay van Garderen (USA)	BMC Racing Team	22h 44' 24"
2	Michael Rogers (AUS)	Saxo–Tinkoff	+ 1' 47"
3	Cameron Meyer (AUS)	Orica–GreenEDGE	+ 2' 57"
4	Mathias Frank (SWI)	BMC Racing Team	+ 3' 21"
5	Janier Acevedo (COL)	Jamis–Hagens Berman	+ 3' 31"
6	Matthew Busche (USA)	RadioShack–Leopard	+ 3' 33"
7	Francisco Mancebo (ESP)	5-hour Energy	+ 4' 26"
8	Philip Deignan (IRL)	UnitedHealthcare	+ 4' 52"
9	Chad Haga (USA)	Optum–Kelly Benefit Strategies	+ 5' 02"
10	Lawson Craddock (USA)	Bontrager Cycling Team	+ 5' 04"

=== Stage 7 ===
Dubbed as the queen stage of the Tour, this stage featured three categorized affairs. After 10 mi (16 km) of racing, the riders tackled with the first climb of the day, then it was mostly downhill or flat until they got to the Patterson Pass about halfway through the course. The only intermediate sprint was situated at the bottom of the descent while the riders crossed Livermore, after which they climbed the "Hors Catégorie" Mount Diablo to its very top (18.3 km (11.4 mi) at an average 5.8%, the last 150 m (490 ft) kicking up at a steep 16%).

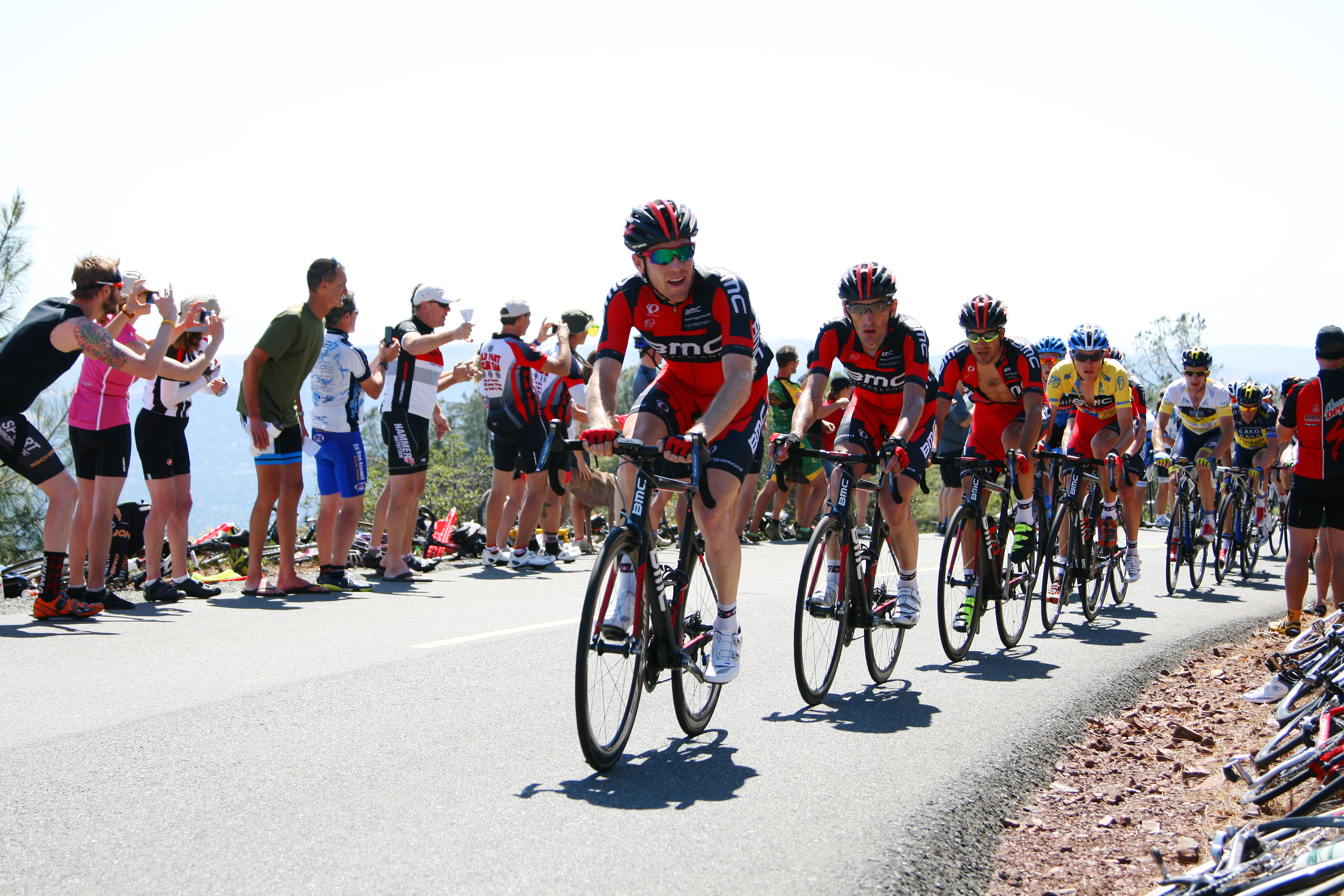
Tejay van Garderen (yellow jersey, meaning leader of overall classification) was protected on the lower slopes of Mount Diablo by three BMC Racing Team teammates (red), dictating the pace.

After 7 riders attempted to break free and failed, a successful move was initiated by Juan Antonio Flecha and his teammate Lieuwe Westra. Flecha was ultimately dropped, but ten riders remained in the fold: Westra, Carter Jones (Bissell), Andy Schleck and his teammate Laurent Didier (RadioShack–Leopard), David De la Cruz (NetApp–Endura), Carlos Verona (Omega Pharma–Quick-Step), Kristijan Koren (Cannondale), Chris Butler (Champion System), Nathan Brown (Bontrager Cycling Team) and Nate English (5-hour Energy). Jones crested the first two difficulties of the day in the lead, insuring that he will be crowned the "Best climber" of the Tour, unless he would happen to be unable to complete stage 8. The breakaway had a maximum advantage of 4 minutes with 44 km (27 mi) to cover, and the best placed rider within the lead group was English at 6' 57". BMC Racing Team and Jamis–Hagens Berman started working in unison at the sharp end of the bunch, and the leading men started climbing Mount Diablo with an advantage that had been reduced to a little more than a minute. The break splintered, leaving only Westra and De la Cruz in front in a bid for a stage win.

The peloton hit the climb with a strong BMC Racing Team presence at the front, sheltering race leader Tejay van Garderen. The riders from the early break were reeled in progressively, and Gavin Mannion (Bontrager Cycling Team) took a plunge in a grassy roadside ditch, with no apparent damage. Jens Voigt (RadioShack–Leopard) placed a strong acceleration with 6 km (3.7 mi) to race, and was soon joined and dropped by Francisco Mancebo (5-hour Energy). The Spaniard continued onward and cruised past the Westra-De la Cruz duo. With 3 km (1.9 mi) to go and an ever-thinning field, Janier Acevedo jumped out and caught Mancebo, who was unable to follow. Back in the yellow jersey group, third-placed Cameron Meyer (Orica–GreenEDGE) was beginning to suffer and was dropped. It was then Leopold König's turn to attack, joining Acevedo. The pair went together under the flamme rouge as the crowd cheered them on. NetApp–Endura's König placed an ultimate dig 300 m (980 ft) from the line, and Acevedo could not answer. The latter finished 7 seconds in arrears of König, ravishing the third overall spot from Meyer, and Van Garderen came in 5 seconds later, cementing his lead in the overall classification.

Stage 7 result

	Rider	Team	Time
1	Leopold König (CZE)	NetApp–Endura	3h 54' 17"
2	Janier Acevedo (COL)	Jamis–Hagens Berman	+ 7"
3	Tejay van Garderen (USA)	BMC Racing Team	+ 12"
4	Michael Rogers (AUS)	Saxo–Tinkoff	+ 12"
5	Mathias Frank (SUI)	BMC Racing Team	+ 23"
6	Matthew Busche (USA)	RadioShack–Leopard	+ 29"
7	Lawson Craddock (USA)	Bontrager Cycling Team	+ 32"
8	Francisco Mancebo (ESP)	5-hour Energy	+ 38"
9	José Mendes (POR)	NetApp–Endura	+ 44"
10	Marc de Maar (CUR)	UnitedHealthcare	+ 44"

General Classification after Stage 7

	Rider	Team	Time
1	Tejay van Garderen (USA)	BMC Racing Team	26h 38' 53"
2	Michael Rogers (AUS)	Saxo–Tinkoff	+ 1' 47"
3	Janier Acevedo (COL)	Jamis–Hagens Berman	+ 3' 26"
4	Mathias Frank (SWI)	BMC Racing Team	+ 3' 32"
5	Cameron Meyer (AUS)	Orica–GreenEDGE	+ 3' 33"
6	Matthew Busche (USA)	RadioShack–Leopard	+ 3' 50"
7	Francisco Mancebo (ESP)	5-hour Energy	+ 4' 52"
8	Lawson Craddock (USA)	Bontrager Cycling Team	+ 5' 24"
9	Philip Deignan (IRL)	UnitedHealthcare	+ 5' 33"
10	Chad Haga (USA)	Optum–Kelly Benefit Strategies	+ 5' 52"

=== Stage 8 ===
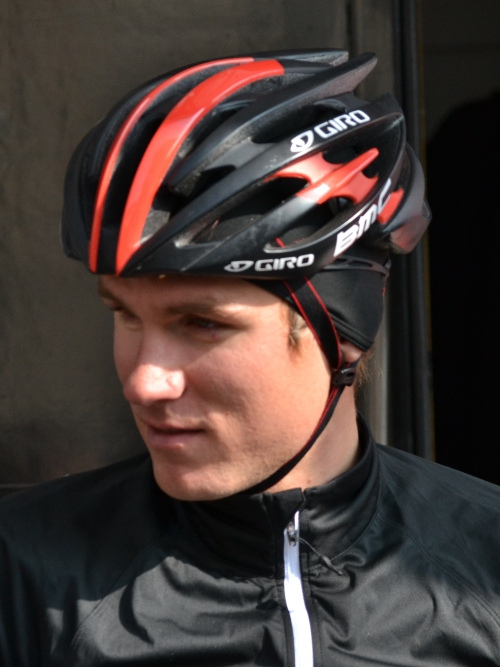
Tejay van Garderen, the overall classification winner is pictured here at the 2013 Paris–Nice.

The final stage of the Tour featured no categorized climbs, although there were a few lumps in the way, the most notable of which having a modest altitude gain of 150 m (490 ft). An intermediate sprint was disputed after 33 mi (53 km) of racing. The final 15 mi (24 km) of the course going into Santa Rosa were basically pan flat. The final kilometers of the whole race were two small loops of 4 km (2.5 mi) in the aforementioned city.

Considering the flat terrain and the time gaps, three of the Overall jerseys (General, Mountains and Youth classifications) were likely to remain on their respective wearers, provided no accidents or large breakaway occurred. It was not the case for the Points classification though, as Peter Sagan only had a single point of an advantage over Tyler Farrar (38 vs. 37) The start signal was given after riders had crossed the Golden Gate Bridge, and eternal breakaway participant Thomas De Gendt immediately took large, accompanied by Bissell's Jason McCartney and Bontrager Cycling Team's Antoine Duchesne. The points on offer at the intermediate sprint in Point Reyes Station were swept up by the trio, as only the three first riders were awarded points, leaving the suspense for the Green Jersey for the finish line. The gap ballooned to a maximum of 4:30 with about 70 km (43 mi) to cover, and then started to shrink. De Gendt suffered a mechanical where he had to change his machine, and Duchesne commented about the difference that bike change made after the stage: "He was really pulling hard in the beginning and doing the most of the work, but after his mechanical – that wasn't his bike and he said that he felt terrible; the seat was too high and stuff like that – so it kind of slowed us down a little."

Duchesne accelerated to get away from the group as they were entering Santa Rosa, but McCartney closed the gap as De Gendt fold back. The pair was soon reeled in however, and the lead-out trains of Garmin–Sharp and Cannondale went to work at the front of the peloton. Sagan was led off very well by his team according to his own words, started the sprint first with 200 m (660 ft) to go and won the race by more than a bike length over Daniel Schorn (NetApp–Endura) and his Points classification opponent Tyler Farrar. As he crossed the line, he made a victory salute, one arm in the air, the other arm making the gesture reminiscent of a person trying to start a lawn mower. With that win, Sagan secured the Points classification jersey, as there were no other changes in the classifications. Sagan dedicated his victory to 11-year-old Alex Shepherd, cancer sufferer and cycling enthusiast. Tejay van Garderen won the first stage race in his career, and declared after the feat, "I've known for years that I'm capable of a ride like that", he said. "Finally for it all to fall in place, it's really special."

Stage 8 result

	Rider	Team	Time
1	Peter Sagan (SVK)	Cannondale	3h 04' 07"
2	Daniel Schorn (AUT)	NetApp–Endura	+ 0"
3	Tyler Farrar (USA)	Garmin–Sharp	+ 0"
4	Gianni Meersman (BEL)	Omega Pharma–Quick-Step	+ 0"
5	Ken Hanson (USA)	Optum-Kelly Benefit Strategies	+ 0"
6	Thor Hushovd (NOR)	BMC Racing Team	+ 0"
7	Michael Matthews (AUS)	Orica–GreenEDGE	+ 0"
8	Jacobe Keough (USA)	UnitedHealthcare	+ 0"
9	Sylvain Chavanel (FRA)	Omega Pharma–Quick-Step	+ 0"
10	Matt Brammeier (IRL)	Champion System	+ 0"

General Classification after Stage 8

	Rider	Team	Time
1	Tejay van Garderen (USA)	BMC Racing Team	29h 43' 00"
2	Michael Rogers (AUS)	Saxo–Tinkoff	+ 1' 47"
3	Janier Acevedo (COL)	Jamis–Hagens Berman	+ 3' 26"
4	Mathias Frank (SWI)	BMC Racing Team	+ 3' 32"
5	Cameron Meyer (AUS)	Orica–GreenEDGE	+ 3' 33"
6	Matthew Busche (USA)	RadioShack–Leopard	+ 3' 50"
7	Francisco Mancebo (ESP)	5-hour Energy	+ 4' 52"
8	Lawson Craddock (USA)	Bontrager Cycling Team	+ 5' 24"
9	Philip Deignan (IRL)	UnitedHealthcare	+ 5' 33"
10	Chad Haga (USA)	Optum–Kelly Benefit Strategies	+ 5' 52"

== Classification leadership ==
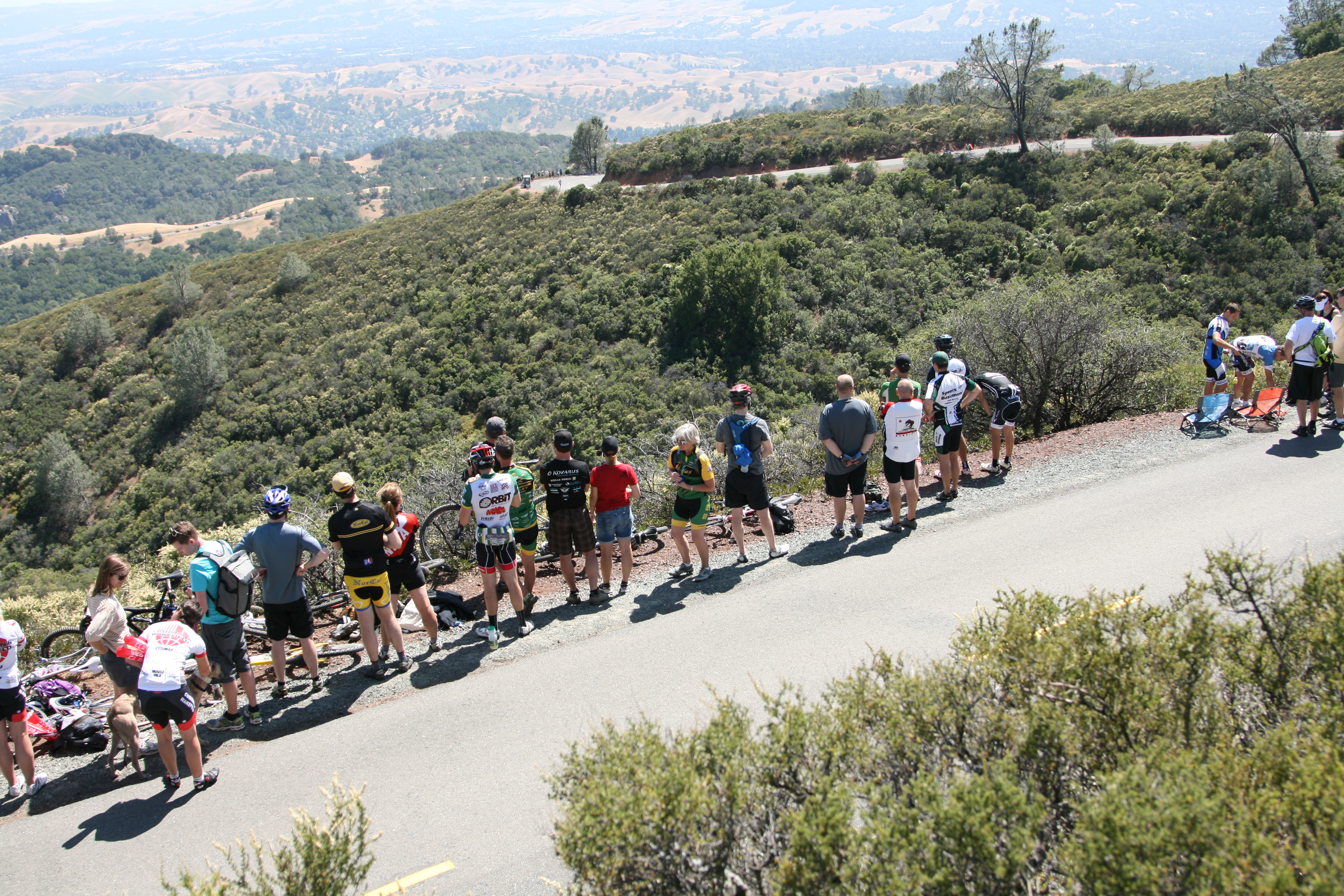
Looking down Mount Diablo during the race on the seventh stage.

In the 2013 Tour of California, 5 jerseys are awarded. For the general classification, calculated by adding the finishing times of the stages per cyclist, the leader receives a yellow jersey (Amgen Race Leader Jersey). This classification is considered the most important of the Tour of California, and the winner of the general classification will be considered the winner of the Tour of California.

Additionally, there is also a sprints classification, akin to what is called the points classification in other races, which awards a green jersey (Visit California Sprint Jersey). In the sprints classification, cyclists receive points for finishing in the top 15 in a stage. In addition, some points can be won in intermediate sprints.

There is also a mountains classification, which awards a Polka dots jersey (Nissan King of the Mountain Jersey). In the mountains classifications, points are won by reaching the top of a mountain before other cyclists. Each climb is categorized, either first, second, third, or fourth category, with more points available for the harder climbs.

There is also a youth classification. This classification is calculated the same way as the general classification, but only young cyclists (under 23) are included. The leader of the young rider classification receives a white and green jersey (Crunchies Best Young Rider Jersey).

The last jersey is awarded to the most combative rider of a stage for him to wear on the next stage. It is generally awarded to a rider who attacks constantly or spends a lot of time in the breakaways. This jersey is blue, white and yellow (Amgen Breakaway from Cancer© Most Courageous Rider Jersey).

There is also a classification for teams. In this classification, the times of the best three cyclists per stage are added, and the team with the lowest time is the leader.

Stage	Winner	General Classification	Youth Classification	Mountains Classification	Sprint Classification	Most Courageous	Team Classification
1	Lieuwe Westra	Lieuwe Westra	Jasper Stuyven	Carter Jones	Lieuwe Westra	James Stemper	5-hour Energy
2	Janier Acevedo	Janier Acevedo	Lawson Craddock	Carter Jones	Lieuwe Westra	Sylvain Chavanel	UnitedHealthcare
3	Peter Sagan	Janier Acevedo	Lawson Craddock	Carter Jones	Lieuwe Westra	Chad Beyer	UnitedHealthcare
4	Tyler Farrar	Janier Acevedo	Lawson Craddock	Carter Jones	Peter Sagan	Nathan Brown	UnitedHealthcare
5	Jens Voigt	Tejay van Garderen	Lawson Craddock	Carter Jones	Peter Sagan	Jens Voigt	UnitedHealthcare
6	Tejay van Garderen	Tejay van Garderen	Lawson Craddock	Carter Jones	Peter Sagan	Michael Rogers	BMC Racing Team
7	Leopold König	Tejay van Garderen	Lawson Craddock	Carter Jones	Peter Sagan	Lieuwe Westra	BMC Racing Team
8	Peter Sagan	Tejay van Garderen	Lawson Craddock	Carter Jones	Peter Sagan	Jason McCartney	BMC Racing Team
Final		Tejay van Garderen	Lawson Craddock	Carter Jones	Peter Sagan	not awarded	BMC Racing Team

== Classification standings ==
Legend
Yellow jersey	Denotes the leader of the General classification	Polka dot jersey	Denotes the leader of the Mountains classification
Green jersey	Denotes the leader of the Points classification	White jersey	Denotes the leader of the Young rider classification

=== General classification ===
	Rider	Team	Time
1	Tejay van Garderen (USA)	BMC Racing Team	29h 43' 00"
2	Michael Rogers (AUS)	Saxo–Tinkoff	+ 1' 47"
3	Janier Acevedo (COL)	Jamis–Hagens Berman	+ 3' 26"
4	Mathias Frank (SWI)	BMC Racing Team	+ 3' 32"
5	Cameron Meyer (AUS)	Orica–GreenEDGE	+ 3' 33"
6	Matthew Busche (USA)	RadioShack–Leopard	+ 3' 50"
7	Francisco Mancebo (ESP)	5-hour Energy	+ 4' 52"
8	Lawson Craddock (USA)	Bontrager Cycling Team	+ 5' 24"
9	Philip Deignan (IRL)	UnitedHealthcare	+ 5' 33"
10	Chad Haga (USA)	Optum–Kelly Benefit Strategies	+ 5' 52"

=== Points classification ===
	Rider	Team	Points
1	Peter Sagan (SVK)	Cannondale	53
2	Tyler Farrar (USA)	Garmin–Sharp	47
3	Gianni Meersman (BEL)	Omega Pharma–Quick-Step	31
4	Thor Hushovd (NOR)	BMC Racing Team	29
5	Lieuwe Westra (NED)	Vacansoleil–DCM	28
6	Michael Matthews (AUS)	Orica–GreenEDGE	27
7	Ken Hanson (USA)	Optum–Kelly Benefit Strategies	18
8	Jens Voigt (GER)	RadioShack–Leopard	15
9	Francisco Mancebo (ESP)	5-hour Energy	12
10	Alex Candelario (USA)	Optum–Kelly Benefit Strategies	12

=== King of the Mountains classification ===
	Rider	Team	Points
1	Carter Jones (USA)	Bissell	47
2	Janier Acevedo (COL)	Jamis–Hagens Berman	20
3	Andy Schleck (LUX)	RadioShack–Leopard	20
4	Marsh Cooper (CAN)	Optum–Kelly Benefit Strategies	18
5	Tejay van Garderen (USA)	BMC Racing Team	17
6	James Stemper (USA)	5-hour Energy	17
7	Leopold König (CZE)	NetApp–Endura	12
8	Chad Beyer (USA)	Champion System	12
9	Chris Baldwin (USA)	Bissell	12
10	Michael Rogers (AUS)	Saxo–Tinkoff	12

=== Young Riders classification ===
	Rider	Team	Time
1	Lawson Craddock (USA)	Bontrager Cycling Team	29h 48' 24"
3	Gavin Mannion (USA)	Bontrager Cycling Team	+ 15' 26"
2	Tanner Putt (USA)	Bontrager Cycling Team	+ 18' 09"
4	Bob Jungels (LUX)	RadioShack–Leopard	+ 20' 47"
5	Jacob Rathe (USA)	Garmin–Sharp	+ 21' 34"
6	Jasper Stuyven (BEL)	Bontrager Cycling Team	+ 24' 17"
7	Guillaume Van Keirsbulck (BEL)	Omega Pharma–Quick-Step	+ 30' 34"
8	Jay McCarthy (AUS)	Saxo–Tinkoff	+ 30' 59"
9	Nathan Brown (USA)	Bontrager Cycling Team	+ 31' 36"
10	Lachlan Morton (AUS)	Garmin–Sharp	+ 31' 51"

=== Team classification ===
	Team	Time
1	BMC Racing Team	89h 21′ 37″
2	RadioShack–Leopard	+ 8' 09″
3	UnitedHealthcare	+ 12' 02″
4	5-hour Energy	+ 13' 24″
5	NetApp–Endura	+ 14' 43″
6	Bontrager Cycling Team	+ 26' 10″
7	Garmin–Sharp	+ 36' 00″
8	Champion System	+ 40' 25″
9	Orica–GreenEDGE	+ 43' 51″
10	Saxo–Tinkoff	+ 45' 14″
