= Team Jamis =

American cycling team

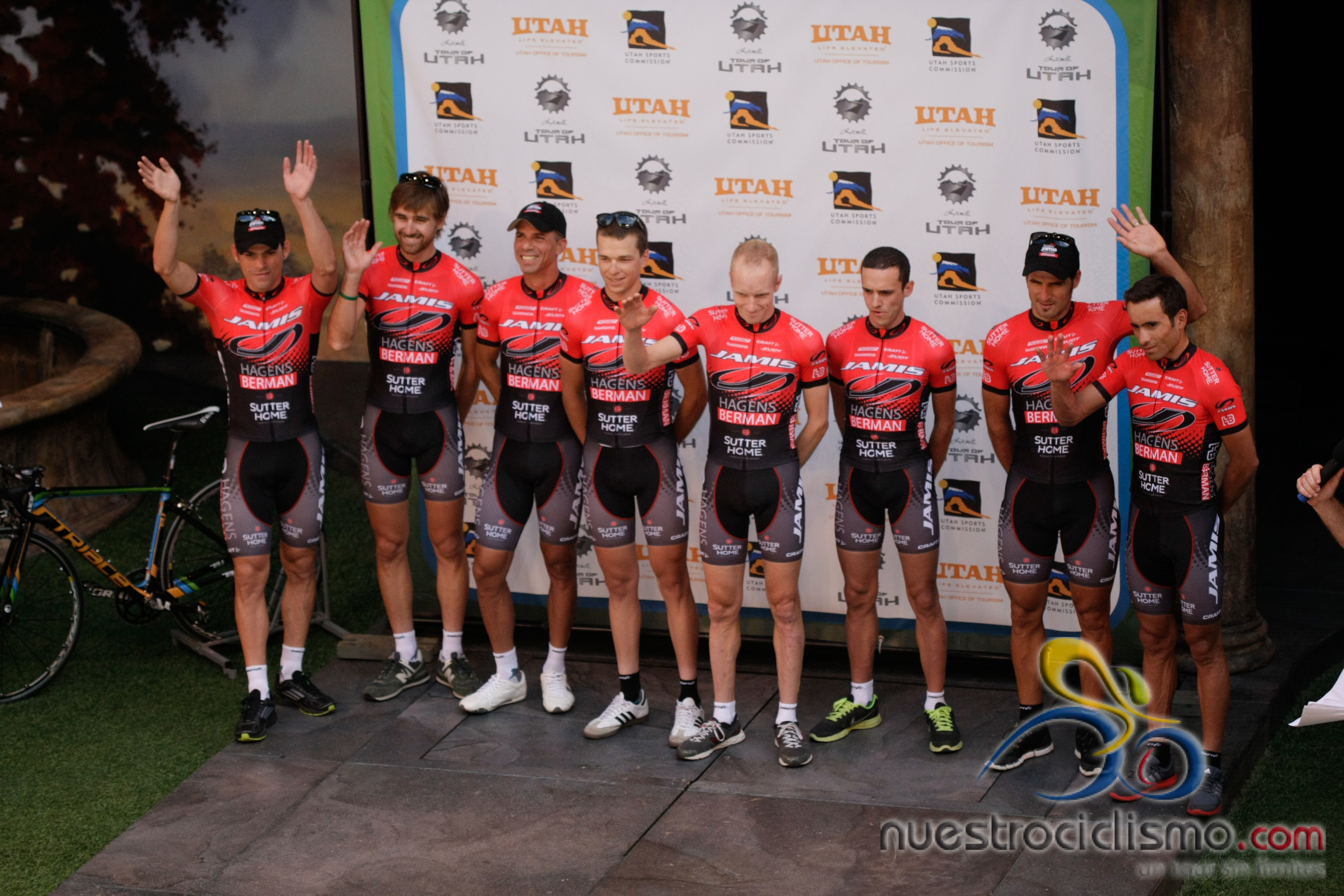

Team information
- UCI code: JSH
- Registered: United States
- Founded: 2003
- Disbanded: 2016
- Discipline: Road

Key personnel
- General manager: Carine Joannou
- Team manager: Sebastian Alexandre

Team name history
- 2003–2004 2005–2009 2010–2012 2013–2015 2016: Colavita–Bolla Wines; Colavita–Sutter Home; Jamis–Sutter Home; Jamis–Hagens Berman; Team Jamis

Team Jamis (UCI team code: JSH) was an American UCI Continental cycling team that focused on road bicycle racing. The team was managed by Carine Joannou of Jamis Bicycles with assistance from directeur sportif Sebastian Alexandre.

The disbanded at the end of the 2016 season.

== Final roster ==
As of February 22, 2016.

Rider	Date of birth
Janier Acevedo (COL)	December 6, 1985 (aged 30)
Luis Amarán (CUB)	April 7, 1979 (aged 36)
Stephen Bassett (USA)	March 27, 1995 (aged 20)
Rubén Companioni (CUB)	May 18, 1990 (aged 25)
Lucas Sebastián Haedo (ARG)	April 18, 1983 (aged 32)
Stephen Leece (USA)	November 4, 1991 (aged 24)

Rider	Date of birth
Eric Marcotte (USA)	February 8, 1980 (aged 35)
Carson Miller (USA)	January 9, 1989 (aged 26)
Kyle Murphy (USA)	October 5, 1991 (aged 24)
Brayan Sánchez (COL)	June 3, 1994 (aged 21)
Eric Schildge (USA)	April 21, 1988 (aged 27)

== Major wins ==
2005
Stages 2 & 3 Redlands Bicycle Classic, Juan José Haedo
2007
Stage 3 Vuelta por un Chile Líder, Luca Damiani
2008
Stage 2 Tour of the Gila, Tyler Wren
US Air Force Cycling Classic, Lucas Sebastián Haedo
2010
Stage 4b Volta de São Paulo, Alejandro Borrajo
2011
Stage 9 Vuelta Ciclista de Chile, Tyler Wren
Stage 5 Volta do Rio de Janeiro, Eric Schildge
Overall Tour of Elk Grove, Luis Amarán
2012
Stage 4 Tour of the Gila, Alejandro Borrajo
2013
Stage 1 Tour of the Gila, Janier Acevedo
Stage 2 Tour of California, Janier Acevedo
Stage 4 USA Pro Cycling Challenge, Janier Acevedo
2014
Stages 1 & 5 Tour of the Gila, Daniel Jaramillo
Stages 4 Tour of the Gila, Luis Amarán
Stages 3 Grand Prix Cycliste de Saguenay, Juan José Haedo
2015
Stage 1 (ITT) Joe Martin Stage Race, Gregory Brenes
Stage 4 Joe Martin Stage Race, Lucas Sebastián Haedo
Stage 4 Tour of the Gila, Lucas Sebastián Haedo
2016
Stage 1 (ITT) Joe Martin Stage Race, Janier Acevedo
Stage 2 Joe Martin Stage Race, Lucas Sebastián Haedo
Stage 4 Tour of the Gila, Eric Marcotte
Stages 3 & 5 Vuelta a Colombia, Lucas Sebastián Haedo
