= 2017 Tour of the Basque Country =

Cycling race

2017 UCI World Tour, race 14 of 37

Race details
- Dates: 3–8 April 2017
- Stages: 6
- Distance: 828.8 km (515.0 mi)
- Winning time: 20h 41' 25"

Results
Jersey awarded to the overall winner	Winner	Alejandro Valverde (ESP)	(Movistar Team)
	Second	Alberto Contador (ESP)	(Trek–Segafredo)
	Third	Ion Izagirre (ESP)	(Bahrain–Merida)
Jersey awarded to the points classification winner	Points	Alejandro Valverde (ESP)	(Movistar Team)
Jersey awarded to the mountains classification winner	Mountains	Alex Howes (USA)	(Cannondale–Drapac)
Jersey awarded to the sprints classification winner	Sprints	Lluís Mas (ESP)	(Caja Rural–Seguros RGA)
	Team	Bahrain–Merida	

The 2017 Tour of the Basque Country was a road cycling stage race that took place between 3 and 8 April. It was the 57th edition of the Tour of the Basque Country and was the fourteenth event of the 2017 UCI World Tour.

The race was won for the first time by Alejandro Valverde of the Movistar Team, who took the race lead on the penultimate day after winning the queen stage in Eibar, before further extending the lead by finishing second in the final-day individual time trial; Valverde's finishes on those stages aided him to take the points classification from Team Sunweb's Michael Matthews at the death. Valverde finished 17 seconds clear of four-time race winner Alberto Contador (Trek–Segafredo) while the all-Spanish podium was completed by the national time trial champion, Ion Izagirre, a further four seconds in arrears of Contador for the Bahrain–Merida team.

In the race's other classifications, Cannondale–Drapac's Alex Howes won the polka-dot jersey as winner of the mountains classification, Lluís Mas (Caja Rural–Seguros RGA) was the winner of the intermediate sprints classification while Bahrain–Merida won the teams classification.

== Route ==
The full route of the 2017 Tour of the Basque Country was announced on 23 March 2017.

Stage schedule
Stage	Date	Route	Distance	Type	Winner
1	3 April	Pamplona to Valle de Egüés	153.3 km (95 mi)	Hilly stage	Michael Matthews (AUS)
2	4 April	Pamplona to Elciego	173.4 km (108 mi)	Medium-mountain stage	Michael Albasini (SUI)
3	5 April	Vitoria-Gasteiz to San Sebastián	160.5 km (100 mi)	Medium-mountain stage	David de la Cruz (ESP)
4	6 April	San Sebastián to Bilbao	174.1 km (108 mi)	Medium-mountain stage	Primož Roglič (SLO)
5	7 April	Bilbao to Eibar	139.8 km (87 mi)	Mountain stage	Alejandro Valverde (ESP)
6	8 April	Eibar to Eibar	27.7 km (17 mi)	Individual time trial	Primož Roglič (SLO)

== Participating teams ==
As the Tour of the Basque Country was a UCI World Tour event, all eighteen UCI WorldTeams were invited automatically and were obliged to enter a team in the race. Two UCI Professional Continental teams – Cofidis and Caja Rural–Seguros RGA – were awarded wildcard places, bringing the number of teams to twenty. As each team included eight riders, a total of 160 riders started the first stage.

UCI WorldTeams

- AG2R La Mondiale
- Astana
- Bahrain–Merida
- BMC Racing Team
- Bora–Hansgrohe
- Cannondale–Drapac
- Team Dimension Data
- FDJ
- Team Katusha–Alpecin
- LottoNL–Jumbo
- Lotto–Soudal
- Movistar Team
- Orica–Scott
- Quick-Step Floors
- Team Sky
- Team Sunweb
- Trek–Segafredo
- UAE Team Emirates

UCI Professional Continental teams

- Caja Rural–Seguros RGA
- Cofidis

== Stages ==
=== Stage 1 ===
3 April 2017 — Pamplona to Valle de Egüés, 153.3 km (95 mi)

Result of Stage 1 & General classification after Stage 1
Rank	Rider	Team	Time
1	Michael Matthews (AUS)	Team Sunweb	3h 45' 07"
2	Jay McCarthy (AUS)	Bora–Hansgrohe	+ 0"
3	Simon Gerrans (AUS)	Orica–Scott	+ 0"
4	Jhonatan Restrepo (COL)	Team Katusha–Alpecin	+ 0"
5	Sean De Bie (BEL)	Lotto–Soudal	+ 0"
6	Maximiliano Richeze (ARG)	Quick-Step Floors	+ 0"
7	Rigoberto Urán (COL)	Cannondale–Drapac	+ 0"
8	Anthony Roux (FRA)	FDJ	+ 0"
9	Ben Swift (GBR)	UAE Team Emirates	+ 0"
10	Gregor Mühlberger (AUT)	Bora–Hansgrohe	+ 0"

=== Stage 2 ===
4 April 2017 — Pamplona to Elciego, 173.4 km (108 mi)

Result of Stage 2
Rank	Rider	Team	Time
1	Michael Albasini (SUI)	Orica–Scott	4h 35' 22"
2	Maximiliano Richeze (ARG)	Quick-Step Floors	+ 0"
3	Sean De Bie (BEL)	Lotto–Soudal	+ 0"
4	Michael Matthews (AUS)	Team Sunweb	+ 0"
5	Paul Martens (GER)	LottoNL–Jumbo	+ 0"
6	Matej Mohorič (SLO)	UAE Team Emirates	+ 0"
7	Alejandro Valverde (ESP)	Movistar Team	+ 0"
8	Rudy Molard (FRA)	FDJ	+ 0"
9	Manuele Mori (ITA)	UAE Team Emirates	+ 0"
10	Michał Kwiatkowski (POL)	Team Sky	+ 0"

General classification after Stage 2
Rank	Rider	Team	Time
1	Michael Matthews (AUS)	Team Sunweb	8h 20' 29"
2	Maximiliano Richeze (ARG)	Quick-Step Floors	+ 0"
3	Sean De Bie (BEL)	Lotto–Soudal	+ 0"
4	Michael Schwarzmann (GER)	Bora–Hansgrohe	+ 0"
5	Alejandro Valverde (ESP)	Movistar Team	+ 0"
6	Jay McCarthy (AUS)	Bora–Hansgrohe	+ 0"
7	Matej Mohorič (SLO)	UAE Team Emirates	+ 0"
8	Patrick Konrad (AUT)	Bora–Hansgrohe	+ 0"
9	Michał Kwiatkowski (POL)	Team Sky	+ 0"
10	Anthony Roux (FRA)	FDJ	+ 0"

=== Stage 3 ===
5 April 2017 — Vitoria-Gasteiz to San Sebastián, 160.5 km (100 mi)

Result of Stage 3
Rank	Rider	Team	Time
1	David de la Cruz (ESP)	Quick-Step Floors	3h 54' 25"
2	Michał Kwiatkowski (POL)	Team Sky	+ 3"
3	Jay McCarthy (AUS)	Bora–Hansgrohe	+ 3"
4	Alejandro Valverde (ESP)	Movistar Team	+ 3"
5	Giovanni Visconti (ITA)	Bahrain–Merida	+ 3"
6	Rudy Molard (FRA)	FDJ	+ 3"
7	Diego Ulissi (ITA)	UAE Team Emirates	+ 3"
8	Patrick Konrad (AUT)	Bora–Hansgrohe	+ 3"
9	Tosh Van der Sande (BEL)	Lotto–Soudal	+ 3"
10	Warren Barguil (FRA)	Team Sunweb	+ 3"

General classification after Stage 3
Rank	Rider	Team	Time
1	David de la Cruz (ESP)	Quick-Step Floors	12h 14' 54"
2	Jay McCarthy (AUS)	Bora–Hansgrohe	+ 3"
3	Alejandro Valverde (ESP)	Movistar Team	+ 3"
4	Michał Kwiatkowski (POL)	Team Sky	+ 3"
5	Patrick Konrad (AUT)	Bora–Hansgrohe	+ 3"
6	Rudy Molard (FRA)	FDJ	+ 3"
7	Tosh Van der Sande (BEL)	Lotto–Soudal	+ 3"
8	Luis León Sánchez (ESP)	Astana	+ 3"
9	Romain Bardet (FRA)	AG2R La Mondiale	+ 3"
10	Rubén Fernández (ESP)	Movistar Team	+ 3"

=== Stage 4 ===
6 April 2017 — San Sebastián to Bilbao, 174.1 km (108 mi)

Result of Stage 4
Rank	Rider	Team	Time
1	Primož Roglič (SLO)	LottoNL–Jumbo	4h 23' 46"
2	Michael Matthews (AUS)	Team Sunweb	+ 3"
3	Giovanni Visconti (ITA)	Bahrain–Merida	+ 3"
4	Michał Kwiatkowski (POL)	Team Sky	+ 3"
5	Simon Yates (GBR)	Orica–Scott	+ 3"
6	Patrick Konrad (AUT)	Bora–Hansgrohe	+ 3"
7	Rudy Molard (FRA)	FDJ	+ 3"
8	Diego Ulissi (ITA)	UAE Team Emirates	+ 3"
9	Emanuel Buchmann (GER)	Bora–Hansgrohe	+ 3"
10	Alejandro Valverde (ESP)	Movistar Team	+ 3"

General classification after Stage 4
Rank	Rider	Team	Time
1	David de la Cruz (ESP)	Quick-Step Floors	16h 38' 43"
2	Primož Roglič (SLO)	LottoNL–Jumbo	+ 0"
3	Michał Kwiatkowski (POL)	Team Sky	+ 3"
4	Alejandro Valverde (ESP)	Movistar Team	+ 3"
5	Patrick Konrad (AUT)	Bora–Hansgrohe	+ 3"
6	Rudy Molard (FRA)	FDJ	+ 3"
7	George Bennett (NZL)	LottoNL–Jumbo	+ 3"
8	Rubén Fernández (ESP)	Movistar Team	+ 3"
9	Rigoberto Urán (COL)	Cannondale–Drapac	+ 3"
10	Romain Bardet (FRA)	AG2R La Mondiale	+ 3"

=== Stage 5 ===
7 April 2017 — Bilbao to Eibar, 139.8 km (87 mi)

Result of Stage 5
Rank	Rider	Team	Time
1	Alejandro Valverde (ESP)	Movistar Team	3h 26' 32"
2	Romain Bardet (FRA)	AG2R La Mondiale	+ 0"
3	Rigoberto Urán (COL)	Cannondale–Drapac	+ 0"
4	Michael Woods (CAN)	Cannondale–Drapac	+ 0"
5	Louis Meintjes (RSA)	UAE Team Emirates	+ 0"
6	Alberto Contador (ESP)	Trek–Segafredo	+ 3"
7	Ion Izagirre (ESP)	Bahrain–Merida	+ 15"
8	Sergio Henao (COL)	Team Sky	+ 15"
9	Simon Yates (GBR)	Orica–Scott	+ 15"
10	David de la Cruz (ESP)	Quick-Step Floors	+ 22"

General classification after Stage 5
Rank	Rider	Team	Time
1	Alejandro Valverde (ESP)	Movistar Team	20h 05' 18"
2	Rigoberto Urán (COL)	Cannondale–Drapac	+ 0"
3	Romain Bardet (FRA)	AG2R La Mondiale	+ 0"
4	Louis Meintjes (RSA)	UAE Team Emirates	+ 0"
5	Michael Woods (CAN)	Cannondale–Drapac	+ 0"
6	Alberto Contador (ESP)	Trek–Segafredo	+ 3"
7	Ion Izagirre (ESP)	Bahrain–Merida	+ 15"
8	Sergio Henao (COL)	Team Sky	+ 15"
9	David de la Cruz (ESP)	Quick-Step Floors	+ 19"
10	Patrick Konrad (AUT)	Bora–Hansgrohe	+ 22"

=== Stage 6 ===
8 April 2017 — Eibar to Eibar, 27.7 km (17 mi), individual time trial (ITT)

Result of Stage 6
Rank	Rider	Team	Time
1	Primož Roglič (SLO)	LottoNL–Jumbo	35' 58"
2	Alejandro Valverde (ESP)	Movistar Team	+ 9"
3	Ion Izagirre (ESP)	Bahrain–Merida	+ 15"
4	Alberto Contador (ESP)	Trek–Segafredo	+ 23"
5	David de la Cruz (ESP)	Quick-Step Floors	+ 34"
6	Michael Matthews (AUS)	Team Sunweb	+ 41"
7	Vasil Kiryienka (BLR)	Team Sky	+ 52"
8	Diego Ulissi (ITA)	UAE Team Emirates	+ 52"
9	Víctor de la Parte (ESP)	Movistar Team	+ 1' 04"
10	George Bennett (NZL)	LottoNL–Jumbo	+ 1' 23"

Final general classification
Rank	Rider	Team	Time
1	Alejandro Valverde (ESP)	Movistar Team	20h 41' 25"
2	Alberto Contador (ESP)	Trek–Segafredo	+ 17"
3	Ion Izagirre (ESP)	Bahrain–Merida	+ 21"
4	David de la Cruz (ESP)	Quick-Step Floors	+ 44"
5	Primož Roglič (SLO)	LottoNL–Jumbo	+ 59"
6	Louis Meintjes (RSA)	UAE Team Emirates	+ 1' 19"
7	Patrick Konrad (AUT)	Bora–Hansgrohe	+ 1' 40"
8	Sergio Henao (COL)	Team Sky	+ 1' 51"
9	Rigoberto Urán (COL)	Cannondale–Drapac	+ 1' 56"
10	Simon Špilak (SLO)	Team Katusha–Alpecin	+ 2' 01"

== Classification leadership table ==
In the 2017 Tour of the Basque Country, four different jerseys were awarded. For the general classification, calculated by adding each cyclist's finishing times on each stage, the leader received a yellow jersey. This classification was considered the most important of the 2017 Tour of the Basque Country, and the winner of the classification was considered the winner of the race.

Points for the mountains classification
Position	1	2	3	4	5	6
Points for Category 1	10	8	6	4	2	1
Points for Category 2	6	4	2	1	0	
Points for Category 3	3	2	1	0		

Additionally, there was a points classification, which awarded a white jersey. In the points classification, cyclists received points for finishing in the top 15 in a stage. For winning a stage, a rider earned 25 points, with 20 for second, 16 for third, 14 for fourth, 12 for fifth, 10 for sixth with a point fewer per place down to a single point for 15th place. There was also a sprints classification for the points awarded at intermediate sprints on each stage (except for the time trial stage) – awarded on a 3–2–1 scale – where the leadership of which was marked by a blue jersey.

The fourth jersey represented the mountains classification, marked by a white and red polka-dot jersey. Points for this classification were won by the first riders to the top of each categorised climb, with more points available for the higher-categorised climbs. There was also a classification for teams, in which the times of the best three cyclists per team on each stage were added together; the leading team at the end of the race was the team with the lowest total time.

Stage	Winner	General classification	Points classification	Mountains classification	Sprints classification	Teams classification
1	Michael Matthews	Michael Matthews	Michael Matthews	Yoann Bagot	Lluís Mas	Bora–Hansgrohe
2	Michael Albasini	Michael Matthews	Michael Matthews	Yoann Bagot	Lluís Mas	Bora–Hansgrohe
3	David de la Cruz	David de la Cruz	Michael Matthews	Alex Howes	Lluís Mas	Bora–Hansgrohe
4	Primož Roglič	David de la Cruz	Michael Matthews	Alex Howes	Jonathan Lastra	Bahrain–Merida
5	Alejandro Valverde	Alejandro Valverde	Michael Matthews	Alex Howes	Lluís Mas	Bahrain–Merida
6	Primož Roglič	Alejandro Valverde	Alejandro Valverde	Alex Howes	Lluís Mas	Bahrain–Merida
Final		Alejandro Valverde	Alejandro Valverde	Alex Howes	Lluís Mas	Bahrain–Merida
