= 2015 Tour of Turkey =

2015 UCI Europe Tour

Race details
- Dates: 26 April – 3 May 2015
- Stages: 8
- Distance: 1,252 km (778.0 mi)
- Winning time: 31h 06' 44"

Results
Jersey awarded to the overall winner	Winner	Kristijan Đurasek (CRO)	(Lampre–Merida)
	Second	Eduardo Sepúlveda (ARG)	(Bretagne–Séché Environnement)
	Third	Jay McCarthy (AUS)	(Tinkoff–Saxo)
Jersey awarded to the points classification winner	Points	Mark Cavendish (GBR)	(Etixx–Quick-Step)
Jersey awarded to the mountains classification winner	Mountains	Juan Pablo Valencia (COL)	(Colombia)
Jersey awarded to the sprints classification winner	Sprints	Lluís Mas (ESP)	(Caja Rural–Seguros RGA)
	Team	Caja Rural–Seguros RGA	

The 2015 Tour of Turkey was the 51st edition of the Presidential Cycling Tour of Turkey cycling stage race. It started on 26 April in Alanya and finished on 3 May in Istanbul.

== Schedule ==
Stage	Date	Course	Distance	Type	Winner	Ref
1	26 April	Alanya to Alanya	145 km (90.1 mi)	Flat stage	Mark Cavendish (GBR)	
2	27 April	Alanya to Antalya	182 km (113.1 mi)	Flat stage	Mark Cavendish (GBR)	
3	28 April	Kemer to Elmalı	163 km (101.3 mi)	Mountain stage	Davide Rebellin (ITA)	
4	29 April	Fethiye to Marmaris	132 km (82.0 mi)	Hilly stage	André Greipel (GER)	
5	30 April	Muğla to Pamukkale	160 km (99.4 mi)	Hilly stage	Sacha Modolo (ITA)	
6	1 May	Denizli to Selçuk	184 km (114.3 mi)	Intermediate stage	Pello Bilbao (ESP)	
7	2 May	Selçuk to İzmir	165 km (102.5 mi)	Hilly stage	Mark Cavendish (GBR)	
8	3 May	Istanbul to Istanbul	121 km (75.2 mi)	Flat stage	Lluís Mas (ESP)	
Total		1,252 km (778.0 mi)				

== Teams ==
The start list included 21 teams (6 UCI WorldTeams, 14 Professional Continental Teams, and 1 Continental Team).

World Teams

- Astana
- Etixx–Quick-Step
- Lampre–Merida
- Lotto–Soudal
- Orica–GreenEDGE
- Tinkoff–Saxo

Professional Continental teams

- Bardiani–CSF
- Bretagne–Séché Environnement
- CCC–Sprandi–Polkowice
- Caja Rural–Seguros RGA
- Colombia
- Drapac Professional Cycling
- MTN–Qhubeka
- Nippo–Vini Fantini
- Southeast Pro Cycling
- Team Novo Nordisk
- Topsport Vlaanderen–Baloise
- UnitedHealthcare
- Wanty–Groupe Gobert
- Androni Giocattoli

Continental teams

- Torku Şekerspor

== Stages ==
=== Stage 1 ===
26 April 2015 — Alanya to Alanya, 145 km (90.1 mi)

Stage 1 result and general classification after stage 1
Rank	Rider	Team	Time
1	Mark Cavendish (GBR)	Etixx–Quick-Step	3h 17' 58"
2	Caleb Ewan (AUS)	Orica–GreenEDGE	+ 0"
3	Nicola Ruffoni (ITA)	Bardiani–CSF	+ 0"
4	Sacha Modolo (ITA)	Lampre–Merida	+ 0"
5	Theo Bos (NED)	MTN–Qhubeka	+ 0"
6	Michael Kolář (SVK)	Tinkoff–Saxo	+ 0"
7	Daniele Ratto (ITA)	UnitedHealthcare	+ 0"
8	André Greipel (GER)	Lotto–Soudal	+ 0"
9	Brenton Jones (AUS)	Drapac Professional Cycling	+ 0"
10	Jakub Mareczko (ITA)	Southeast Pro Cycling	+ 0"

=== Stage 2 ===
27 April 2015 — Alanya to Antalya, 182 km (113.1 mi)

Stage 2 result
Rank	Rider	Team	Time
1	Mark Cavendish (GBR)	Etixx–Quick-Step	4h 21' 32"
2	Sacha Modolo (ITA)	Lampre–Merida	+ 0"
3	Nicola Ruffoni (ITA)	Bardiani–CSF	+ 0"
4	Juan Sebastián Molano (COL)	Colombia	+ 0"
5	Daniele Colli (ITA)	Nippo–Vini Fantini	+ 0"
6	Ahmet Örken (TUR)	Torku Şekerspor	+ 0"
7	Michael Kolář (SVK)	Tinkoff–Saxo	+ 0"
8	Manuel Belletti (ITA)	Southeast Pro Cycling	+ 0"
9	Eduard-Michael Grosu (ROM)	Nippo–Vini Fantini	+ 0"
10	Paolo Simion (ITA)	Bardiani–CSF	+ 0"

General classification after stage 2
Rank	Rider	Team	Time
1	Mark Cavendish (GBR)	Etixx–Quick-Step	7h 39' 30"
2	Sacha Modolo (ITA)	Lampre–Merida	+ 0"
3	Nicola Ruffoni (ITA)	Bardiani–CSF	+ 0"
4	Michael Kolář (SVK)	Tinkoff–Saxo	+ 0"
5	Ahmet Örken (TUR)	Torku Şekerspor	+ 0"
6	Manuel Belletti (ITA)	Southeast Pro Cycling	+ 0"
7	Juan Sebastián Molano (COL)	Colombia	+ 0"
8	Marco Benfatto (ITA)	Androni Giocattoli	+ 0"
9	Brenton Jones (AUS)	Drapac Professional Cycling	+ 0"
10	André Greipel (GER)	Lotto–Soudal	+ 0"

=== Stage 3 ===
28 April 2015 — Kemer to Elmalı, 163 km (101.3 mi)

Stage 3 result
Rank	Rider	Team	Time
1	Davide Rebellin (ITA)	CCC–Sprandi–Polkowice	4h 34' 11"
2	Kristijan Đurasek (CRO)	Lampre–Merida	+ 7"
3	Eduardo Sepúlveda (ARG)	Bretagne–Séché Environnement	+ 50"
4	Jay McCarthy (AUS)	Tinkoff–Saxo	+ 1' 20"
5	Serge Pauwels (BEL)	MTN–Qhubeka	+ 1' 23"
6	Enrico Barbin (ITA)	Bardiani–CSF	+ 1' 29"
7	Heiner Parra (COL)	Caja Rural–Seguros RGA	+ 1' 32"
8	Daniele Ratto (ITA)	UnitedHealthcare	+ 1' 42"
9	Alex Cano (COL)	Colombia	+ 1' 46"
10	Adam Hansen (AUS)	Lotto–Soudal	+ 1' 57"

General classification after stage 3
Rank	Rider	Team	Time
1	Davide Rebellin (ITA)	CCC–Sprandi–Polkowice	12h 13' 41"
2	Kristijan Đurasek (CRO)	Lampre–Merida	+ 7"
3	Eduardo Sepúlveda (ARG)	Bretagne–Séché Environnement	+ 50"
4	Jay McCarthy (AUS)	Tinkoff–Saxo	+ 1' 20"
5	Serge Pauwels (BEL)	MTN–Qhubeka	+ 1' 23"
6	Enrico Barbin (ITA)	Bardiani–CSF	+ 1' 29"
7	Heiner Parra (COL)	Caja Rural–Seguros RGA	+ 1' 32"
8	Daniele Ratto (ITA)	UnitedHealthcare	+ 1' 42"
9	Alex Cano (COL)	Colombia	+ 1' 46"
10	Adam Hansen (AUS)	Lotto–Soudal	+ 1' 57"

=== Stage 4 ===
29 April 2015 — Fethiye to Marmaris, 132 km (82.0 mi)

Stage 4 result
Rank	Rider	Team	Time
1	André Greipel (GER)	Lotto–Soudal	3h 22' 08"
2	Daniele Colli (ITA)	Nippo–Vini Fantini	+ 0"
3	Daniele Ratto (ITA)	UnitedHealthcare	+ 0"
4	Magnus Cort (DEN)	Orica–GreenEDGE	+ 0"
5	Manuel Belletti (ITA)	Southeast Pro Cycling	+ 0"
6	Roberto Ferrari (ITA)	Lampre–Merida	+ 0"
7	Carlos Barbero (ESP)	Caja Rural–Seguros RGA	+ 0"
8	Kristian Sbaragli (ITA)	MTN–Qhubeka	+ 0"
9	Daniele Bennati (ITA)	Tinkoff–Saxo	+ 0"
10	Ahmet Örken (TUR)	Torku Şekerspor	+ 0"

General classification after stage 4
Rank	Rider	Team	Time
1	Davide Rebellin (ITA)	CCC–Sprandi–Polkowice	15h 35' 49"
2	Kristijan Đurasek (CRO)	Lampre–Merida	+ 7"
3	Eduardo Sepúlveda (ARG)	Bretagne–Séché Environnement	+ 50"
4	Jay McCarthy (AUS)	Tinkoff–Saxo	+ 1' 20"
5	Serge Pauwels (BEL)	MTN–Qhubeka	+ 1' 23"
6	Enrico Barbin (ITA)	Bardiani–CSF	+ 1' 29"
7	Daniele Ratto (ITA)	UnitedHealthcare	+ 1' 42"
8	Alex Cano (COL)	Colombia	+ 1' 46"
9	Adam Hansen (AUS)	Lotto–Soudal	+ 1' 57"
10	Mirko Selvaggi (ITA)	Wanty–Groupe Gobert	+ 2' 04"

=== Stage 5 ===
30 April 2015 — Muğla to Pamukkale, 160 km (99.4 mi)

Stage 5 result
Rank	Rider	Team	Time
1	Sacha Modolo (ITA)	Lampre–Merida	4h 06' 19"
2	Carlos Barbero (ESP)	Caja Rural–Seguros RGA	+ 0"
3	Jay McCarthy (AUS)	Tinkoff–Saxo	+ 0"
4	Michael Kolář (SVK)	Tinkoff–Saxo	+ 0"
5	Manuel Belletti (ITA)	Southeast Pro Cycling	+ 0"
6	Jasper De Buyst (BEL)	Lotto–Soudal	+ 0"
7	Eduard Prades (ESP)	Caja Rural–Seguros RGA	+ 0"
8	Daniele Ratto (ITA)	UnitedHealthcare	+ 0"
9	Davide Rebellin (ITA)	CCC–Sprandi–Polkowice	+ 0"
10	Pello Bilbao (ESP)	Caja Rural–Seguros RGA	+ 0"

General classification after stage 5
Rank	Rider	Team	Time
1	Davide Rebellin (ITA)	CCC–Sprandi–Polkowice	19h 42' 08"
2	Kristijan Đurasek (CRO)	Lampre–Merida	+ 22"
3	Eduardo Sepúlveda (ARG)	Bretagne–Séché Environnement	+ 54"
4	Jay McCarthy (AUS)	Tinkoff–Saxo	+ 1' 20"
5	Serge Pauwels (BEL)	MTN–Qhubeka	+ 1' 38"
6	Enrico Barbin (ITA)	Bardiani–CSF	+ 1' 39"
7	Daniele Ratto (ITA)	UnitedHealthcare	+ 1' 42"
8	Alex Cano (COL)	Colombia	+ 1' 56"
9	Mirko Selvaggi (ITA)	Wanty–Groupe Gobert	+ 2' 11"
10	Adam Hansen (AUS)	Lotto–Soudal	+ 2' 12"

=== Stage 6 ===
1 May 2015 — Denizli to Selçuk, 184 km (114.3 mi)

Stage 6 result
Rank	Rider	Team	Time
1	Pello Bilbao (ESP)	Caja Rural–Seguros RGA	4h 38' 46"
2	Miguel Ángel López (COL)	Astana	+ 3"
3	Heiner Parra (COL)	Caja Rural–Seguros RGA	+ 11"
4	Thomas De Gendt (BEL)	Lotto–Soudal	+ 14"
5	Alex Cano (COL)	Colombia	+ 14"
6	Kristijan Đurasek (CRO)	Lampre–Merida	+ 18"
7	Eduardo Sepúlveda (ARG)	Bretagne–Séché Environnement	+ 18"
8	Lluís Mas (ESP)	Caja Rural–Seguros RGA	+ 34"
9	Fabricio Ferrari (URU)	Caja Rural–Seguros RGA	+ 34"
10	Jay McCarthy (AUS)	Tinkoff–Saxo	+ 34"

General classification after stage 6
Rank	Rider	Team	Time
1	Kristijan Đurasek (CRO)	Lampre–Merida	24h 21' 34"
2	Davide Rebellin (ITA)	CCC–Sprandi–Polkowice	+ 21"
3	Eduardo Sepúlveda (ARG)	Bretagne–Séché Environnement	+ 32"
4	Jay McCarthy (AUS)	Tinkoff–Saxo	+ 1' 14"
5	Alex Cano (COL)	Colombia	+ 1' 30"
6	Serge Pauwels (BEL)	MTN–Qhubeka	+ 1' 32"
7	Mirko Selvaggi (ITA)	Wanty–Groupe Gobert	+ 2' 05"
8	Enrico Barbin (ITA)	Bardiani–CSF	+ 2' 08"
9	Adam Hansen (AUS)	Lotto–Soudal	+ 2' 18"
10	Tomasz Marczyński (POL)	Torku Şekerspor	+ 2' 20"

=== Stage 7 ===
2 May 2015 — Selçuk to İzmir, 165 km (102.5 mi)

Stage 7 result
Rank	Rider	Team	Time
1	Mark Cavendish (GBR)	Etixx–Quick-Step	3h 59' 49"
2	Andrea Piechele (ITA)	Bardiani–CSF	+ 0"
3	Kristian Sbaragli (ITA)	MTN–Qhubeka	+ 0"
4	Manuel Belletti (ITA)	Southeast Pro Cycling	+ 0"
5	Magnus Cort (DEN)	Orica–GreenEDGE	+ 0"
6	Daniele Ratto (ITA)	UnitedHealthcare	+ 0"
7	Armindo Fonseca (FRA)	Bretagne–Séché Environnement	+ 0"
8	Jasper De Buyst (BEL)	Lotto–Soudal	+ 0"
9	Davide Appollonio (ITA)	Androni Giocattoli	+ 0"
10	Bakhtiyar Kozhatayev (KAZ)	Astana	+ 0"

General classification after stage 7
Rank	Rider	Team	Time
1	Kristijan Đurasek (CRO)	Lampre–Merida	28h 21' 23"
2	Davide Rebellin (ITA)	CCC–Sprandi–Polkowice	+ 21"
3	Eduardo Sepúlveda (ARG)	Bretagne–Séché Environnement	+ 32"
4	Jay McCarthy (AUS)	Tinkoff–Saxo	+ 1' 14"
5	Alex Cano (COL)	Colombia	+ 1' 30"
6	Serge Pauwels (BEL)	MTN–Qhubeka	+ 1' 32"
7	Mirko Selvaggi (ITA)	Wanty–Groupe Gobert	+ 2' 05"
8	Enrico Barbin (ITA)	Bardiani–CSF	+ 2' 08"
9	Adam Hansen (AUS)	Lotto–Soudal	+ 2' 18"
10	Tomasz Marczyński (POL)	Torku Şekerspor	+ 2' 20"

=== Stage 8 ===
3 May 2015 — Istanbul to Istanbul, 121 km (75.2 mi)

Stage 8 result
Rank	Rider	Team	Time
1	Lluís Mas (ESP)	Caja Rural–Seguros RGA	2h 45' 03"
2	Mark Cavendish (GBR)	Etixx–Quick-Step	+ 0"
3	Carlos Barbero (ESP)	Caja Rural–Seguros RGA	+ 0"
4	Alessandro Petacchi (ITA)	Southeast Pro Cycling	+ 0"
5	Daniele Colli (ITA)	Nippo–Vini Fantini	+ 0"
6	Daniele Ratto (ITA)	UnitedHealthcare	+ 0"
7	Davide Appollonio (ITA)	Androni Giocattoli	+ 0"
8	Eduard Prades (ESP)	Caja Rural–Seguros RGA	+ 0"
9	Roy Jans (BEL)	Wanty–Groupe Gobert	+ 0"
10	Magnus Cort (DEN)	Orica–GreenEDGE	+ 0"

Final general classification
Rank	Rider	Team	Time
1	Kristijan Đurasek (CRO)	Lampre–Merida	31h 06' 44"
2	Eduardo Sepúlveda (ARG)	Bretagne–Séché Environnement	+ 32"
3	Jay McCarthy (AUS)	Tinkoff–Saxo	+ 56"
4	Alex Cano (COL)	Colombia	+ 1' 30"
5	Serge Pauwels (BEL)	MTN–Qhubeka	+ 1' 32"
6	Mirko Selvaggi (ITA)	Wanty–Groupe Gobert	+ 1' 58"
7	Enrico Barbin (ITA)	Bardiani–CSF	+ 2' 01"
8	Tomasz Marczyński (POL)	Torku Şekerspor	+ 2' 02"
9	Adam Hansen (AUS)	Lotto–Soudal	+ 2' 11"
10	Javier Mejías (ESP)	Team Novo Nordisk	+ 2' 15"

== Classification leadership ==
Stage	Winner	General classification	Points classification	Mountains classification	Turkish Beauties classification	Team classification
1	Mark Cavendish	Mark Cavendish	Mark Cavendish	Federico Zurlo	Federico Zurlo	Bardiani–CSF
2	Mark Cavendish	Mark Cavendish	Mark Cavendish	Federico Zurlo	Lluís Mas	Bardiani–CSF
3	Davide Rebellin	Davide Rebellin	Mark Cavendish	Juan Pablo Valencia	Lluís Mas	CCC–Sprandi–Polkowice
4	André Greipel	Davide Rebellin	Mark Cavendish	Juan Pablo Valencia	Lluís Mas	CCC–Sprandi–Polkowice
5	Sacha Modolo	Davide Rebellin	Sacha Modolo	Juan Pablo Valencia	Lluís Mas	CCC–Sprandi–Polkowice
6	Pello Bilbao	Kristijan Đurasek	Sacha Modolo	Juan Pablo Valencia	Lluís Mas	Caja Rural–Seguros RGA
7	Mark Cavendish	Kristijan Đurasek	Daniele Ratto	Juan Pablo Valencia	Lluís Mas	Caja Rural–Seguros RGA
8	Lluís Mas	Kristijan Đurasek	Mark Cavendish	Juan Pablo Valencia	Lluís Mas	Caja Rural–Seguros RGA
Final		Kristijan Đurasek	Mark Cavendish	Juan Pablo Valencia	Lluís Mas	Caja Rural–Seguros RGA

== Final standings ==
Legend
Turquoise jersey	Denotes the leader of the General classification	Green jersey	Denotes the leader of the Points classification
Red jersey	Denotes the leader of the Mountains classification	White jersey	Denotes the leader of the Beauties of Turkey classification

=== General classification ===
Result
Rank	Rider	Team	Time
1	Kristijan Đurasek (CRO)	Lampre–Merida	31h 06' 44"
2	Eduardo Sepúlveda (ARG)	Bretagne–Séché Environnement	+ 32"
3	Jay McCarthy (AUS)	Tinkoff–Saxo	+ 56"
4	Alex Cano (COL)	Colombia	+ 1' 30"
5	Serge Pauwels (BEL)	MTN–Qhubeka	+ 1' 32"
6	Mirko Selvaggi (ITA)	Wanty–Groupe Gobert	+ 1' 58"
7	Enrico Barbin (ITA)	Bardiani–CSF	+ 2' 01"
8	Tomasz Marczyński (POL)	Torku Şekerspor	+ 2' 02"
9	Adam Hansen (AUS)	Lotto–Soudal	+ 2' 11"
10	Javier Mejías (ESP)	Team Novo Nordisk	+ 2' 15"

=== Points classification ===
Result
Rank	Rider	Team	Points
1	Mark Cavendish (GBR)	Etixx–Quick-Step	60
2	Daniele Ratto (ITA)	UnitedHealthcare	58
3	Manuel Belletti (ITA)	Southeast Pro Cycling	44
4	Sacha Modolo (ITA)	Lampre–Merida	41
5	Carlos Barbero (ESP)	Caja Rural–Seguros RGA	40
6	Daniele Colli (ITA)	Nippo–Vini Fantini	36
7	Jay McCarthy (AUS)	Tinkoff–Saxo	34
8	Michael Kolář (SVK)	Tinkoff–Saxo	31
9	Magnus Cort (DEN)	Orica–GreenEDGE	29
10	Lluís Mas (ESP)	Caja Rural–Seguros RGA	26

=== Mountains classification ===
Result
Rank	Rider	Team	Points
1	Juan Pablo Valencia (COL)	Colombia	19
2	Thomas De Gendt (BEL)	Lotto–Soudal	13
3	Songezo Jim (RSA)	MTN–Qhubeka	13
4	Alex Cano (COL)	Colombia	10
5	Kristijan Đurasek (CRO)	Lampre–Merida	7
6	Kenny De Ketele (BEL)	Topsport Vlaanderen–Baloise	6
7	José Gonçalves (POR)	Caja Rural–Seguros RGA	6
8	Pello Bilbao (ESP)	Caja Rural–Seguros RGA	5
9	Sean De Bie (BEL)	Lotto–Soudal	5
10	Eduardo Sepúlveda (ARG)	Bretagne–Séché Environnement	5

=== Turkish Beauties classification ===
Result
Rank	Rider	Team	Points
1	Lluís Mas (ESP)	Caja Rural–Seguros RGA	13
2	Federico Zurlo (ITA)	UnitedHealthcare	11
3	Mark Cavendish (GBR)	Etixx–Quick-Step	5
4	José Gonçalves (POR)	Caja Rural–Seguros RGA	5
5	Kenny De Ketele (BEL)	Topsport Vlaanderen–Baloise	5
6	Muhammet Atalay (TUR)	Torku Şekerspor	5
7	Roy Jans (BEL)	Wanty–Groupe Gobert	5
8	Mattia Pozzo (ITA)	Nippo–Vini Fantini	5
9	Valerio Agnoli (ITA)	Astana	3
10	Songezo Jim (RSA)	MTN–Qhubeka	3

=== Team classification ===
Result
Rank	Team	Time
1	Caja Rural–Seguros RGA	93h 28' 53"
2	Astana	+ 7' 06"
3	Colombia	+ 8' 13"
4	MTN–Qhubeka	+ 10' 46"
5	UnitedHealthcare	+ 11' 00"
6	Lampre–Merida	+ 12' 03"
7	Topsport Vlaanderen–Baloise	+ 13' 56"
8	Lotto–Soudal	+ 14' 22"
9	Bardiani–CSF	+ 16' 02"
10	Tinkoff–Saxo	+ 17' 01"
