= Lluís Mas =

Spanish cyclist

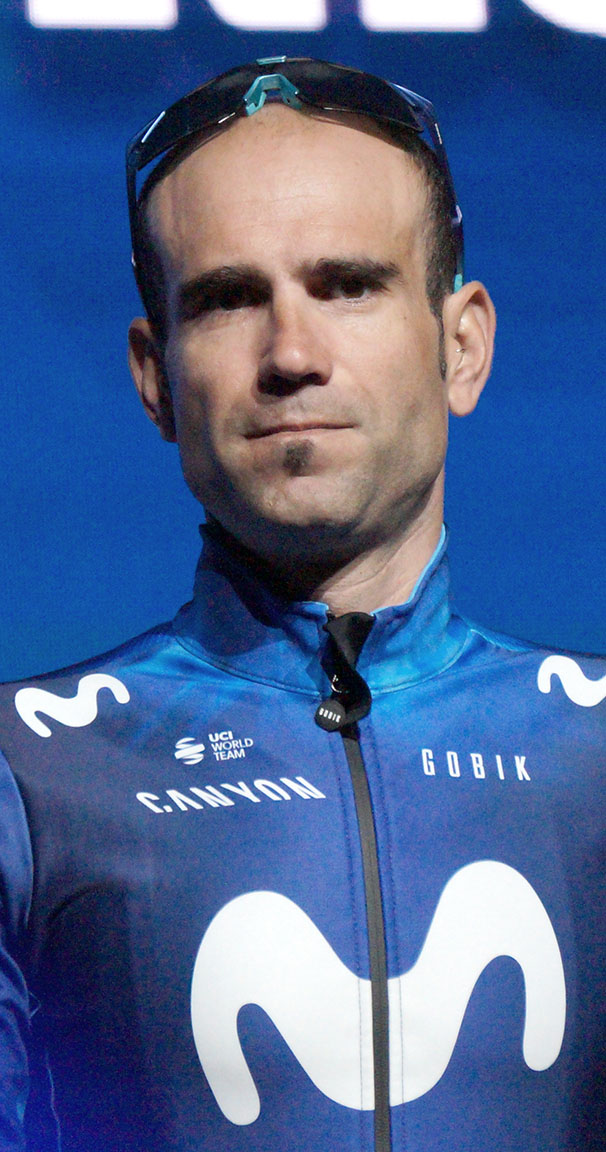
- Mas in 2023

Personal information
- Full name: Lluís Guillermo Mas Bonet
- Born: 15 January 1989 (age 37) Ses Salines, Spain
- Height: 1.81 m (5 ft 11 in)
- Weight: 69 kg (152 lb)

Cycling career
- Sport: Cycling
- Current team: Retired
- Discipline: Road
- Role: Rider
- Rider type: Climber

Amateur team
- 2008: Saunier Duval–Scott amateur

Professional teams
- 2009–2013: Burgos Monumental–Castilla y León
- 2014–2018: Caja Rural–Seguros RGA
- 2019–2023: Movistar Team

Lluís Guillermo Mas Bonet (born 15 January 1989) is a Spanish former racing cyclist, who competed as a professional from 2009 to 2023.

He rode in the Vuelta a España every year from 2014 to 2018. On 3 May 2015, he won the final stage of the Tour of Turkey; he attacked the peloton on a cobbled section a few kilometers from the line, and won just ahead of Mark Cavendish. In May 2019, he was named in the startlist for the 2019 Giro d'Italia.

== Major results ==
2004
2nd Time trial, National Novice Road Championships
2007
1st Overall Vuelta a les Comarces de Castello

1st Stage 2a

1st Trofeo Fernando Escartin
1st Campo de Criptana
2nd Overall Vuelta Ciclista Vegas de Granada

1st Stage 3a

6th Time trial, UCI Juniors World Championships
2009
10th Time trial, Mediterranean Games
2011
7th Time trial, UCI Under-23 Road World Championships
2013
1st Festes Agost Campos
1st Mountains classification, Vuelta a Castilla y León
1st Stage 3 Pla de Mallorca
2nd Time trial, Mediterranean Games
2nd Overall Volta às Terras de Santa Maria Feira

1st Stage 2

2nd Trofeu Festes de Sant Bartomeu
2nd Festes Maria Salut
4th Overall Tour of China I
9th Overall Tour de Bretagne
2014
1st Sprints classification, Vuelta a Burgos
6th Overall Tour d'Azerbaïdjan
Vuelta a España

Held after Stages 3–13
Held after Stage 3
Combativity award Stages 3 & 9

2015
Tour of Turkey

1st Sprints classification
1st Stage 8

1st Sprints classification, Volta a Catalunya
2016
4th Overall Presidential Tour of Turkey

1st Sprints classification

2017
1st Sprints classification, Tour of the Basque Country
1st Mountains classification, Boucles de la Mayenne
2018
1st Mountains classification, Vuelta a Andalucía
Combativity award Stage 9 Vuelta a España
2019
4th Time trial, National Road Championships
2023
3rd Time trial, National Road Championships

=== Grand Tour general classification results timeline ===
Grand Tour	2014	2015	2016	2017	2018	2019	2020	2021	2022
Giro d'Italia	—	—	—	—	—	126	—	—	—
Tour de France	Has not contested during his career								
Vuelta a España	121	DNF	DNF	83	47	—	—	—	133

Legend
—	Did not compete
DNF	Did not finish
