= Juan Pablo Valencia =

Colombian cyclist

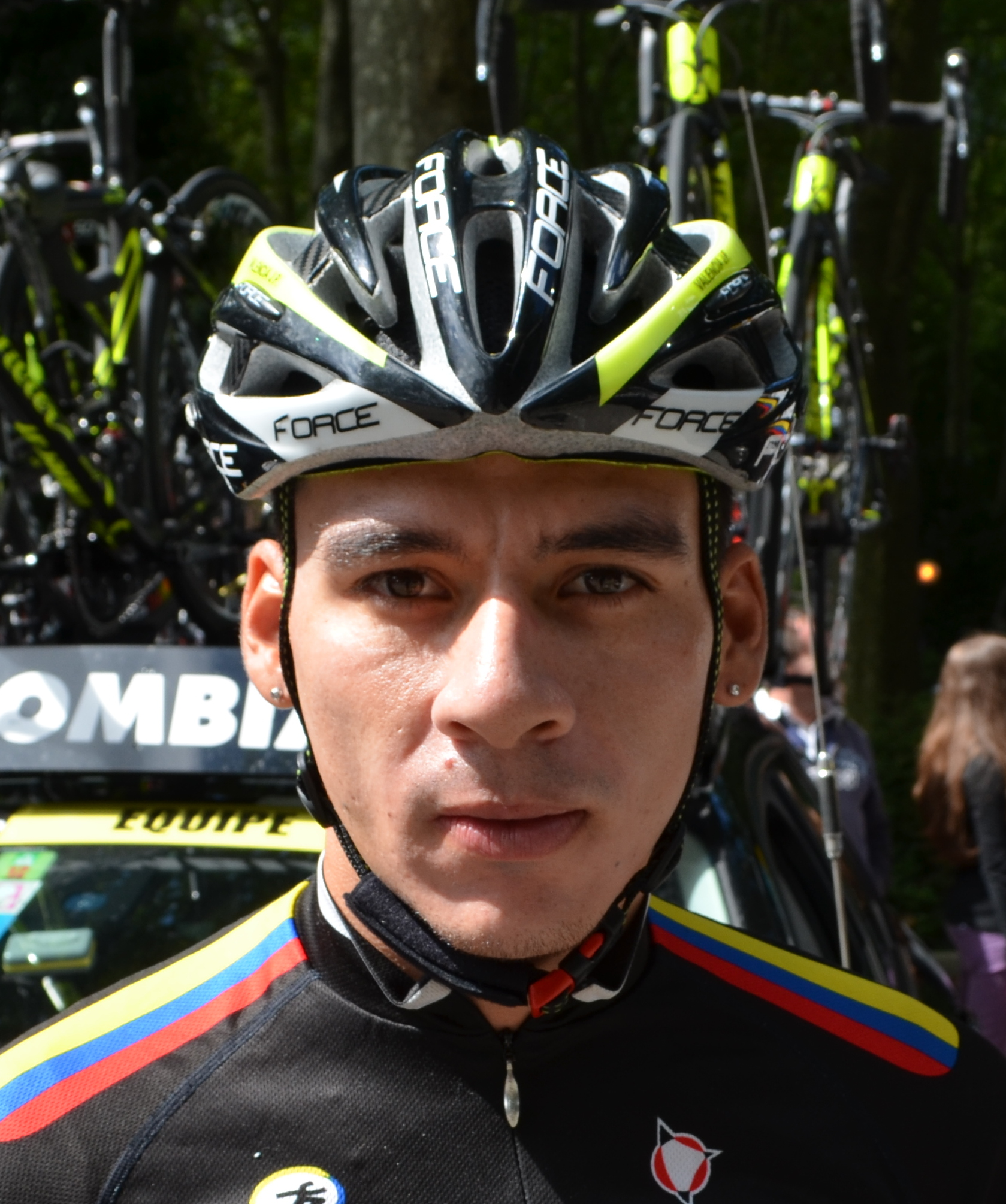
- Valencia in 2014

Personal information
- Full name: Juan Pablo Valencia González
- Born: 2 May 1988 (age 38) Medellín, Colombia
- Height: 1.78 m (5 ft 10 in)
- Weight: 71 kg (157 lb; 11.2 st)

Cycling career
- Sport: Cycling
- Current team: Retired
- Discipline: Road
- Role: Rider
- Rider type: Climber

Amateur team
- 2011–2012: Calzaturieri Montegranaro Marini Silvano

Professional team
- 2012–2015: Colombia–Coldeportes

Juan Pablo Valencia González (born 2 May 1988) is a Colombian former professional racing cyclist. He was named in the start list for the 2015 Vuelta a España.

== Major results ==
2010
1st Road race, National Under-23 Road Championships
2012
2nd Giro del Veneto
4th GP Capodarco
2015
1st Mountains classification Tour of Turkey
