= Javier Mejías =

Spanish road bicycle racer

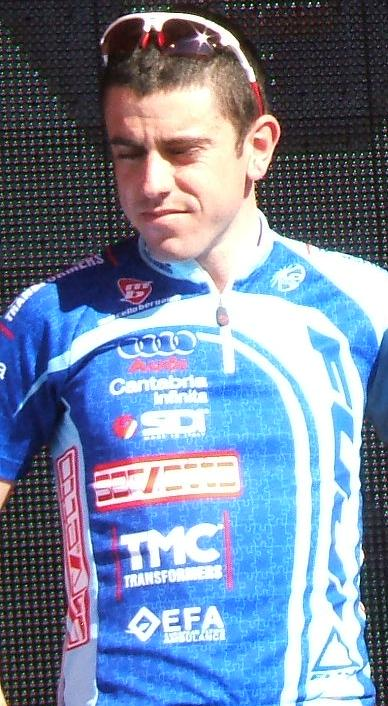

Personal information
- Full name: Javier Mejías Leal
- Born: 30 September 1983 (age 43) Madrid, Madrid, Spain
- Height: 1.73 m (5 ft 8 in)
- Weight: 63 kg (139 lb)

Cycling career
- Sport: Cycling
- Current team: Retired
- Discipline: Road
- Role: Rider
- Rider type: All-rounder

Amateur teams
- 2005: Saunier Duval-Prodir Amateur
- 2005: Saunier Duval–Prodir (stagiaire)

Professional teams
- 2006–2009: Saunier Duval–Prodir
- 2010–2017: Team Type 1

Javier Mejías Leal (born 30 September 1983) is a Spanish former professional road racing cyclist, who rode professionally between 2006 and 2017 for Fuji–Servetto, and Team Novo Nordisk. At the age of fifteen, Mejías was diagnosed with type 1 diabetes. Mejías was born, raised, and resides in Madrid, Madrid, Spain.

== Major results ==
2005
Vuelta a Extremadura

1st Stages 1 & 4

2007
5th Overall Vuelta a Chihuahua

1st Stage 1

6th Gran Premio de Llodio
2010
9th Philadelphia International Championship
2012
3rd Grand Prix de Plumelec-Morbihan
9th Overall Circuit de Lorraine
2014
7th Philadelphia International Cycling Classic
2015
7th Gran Premio di Lugano
10th Overall Tour of Turkey
10th Trofeo Laigueglia
2016
2nd Overall Tour de Korea
8th Japan Cup
