= Songezo Jim =

South African cyclist

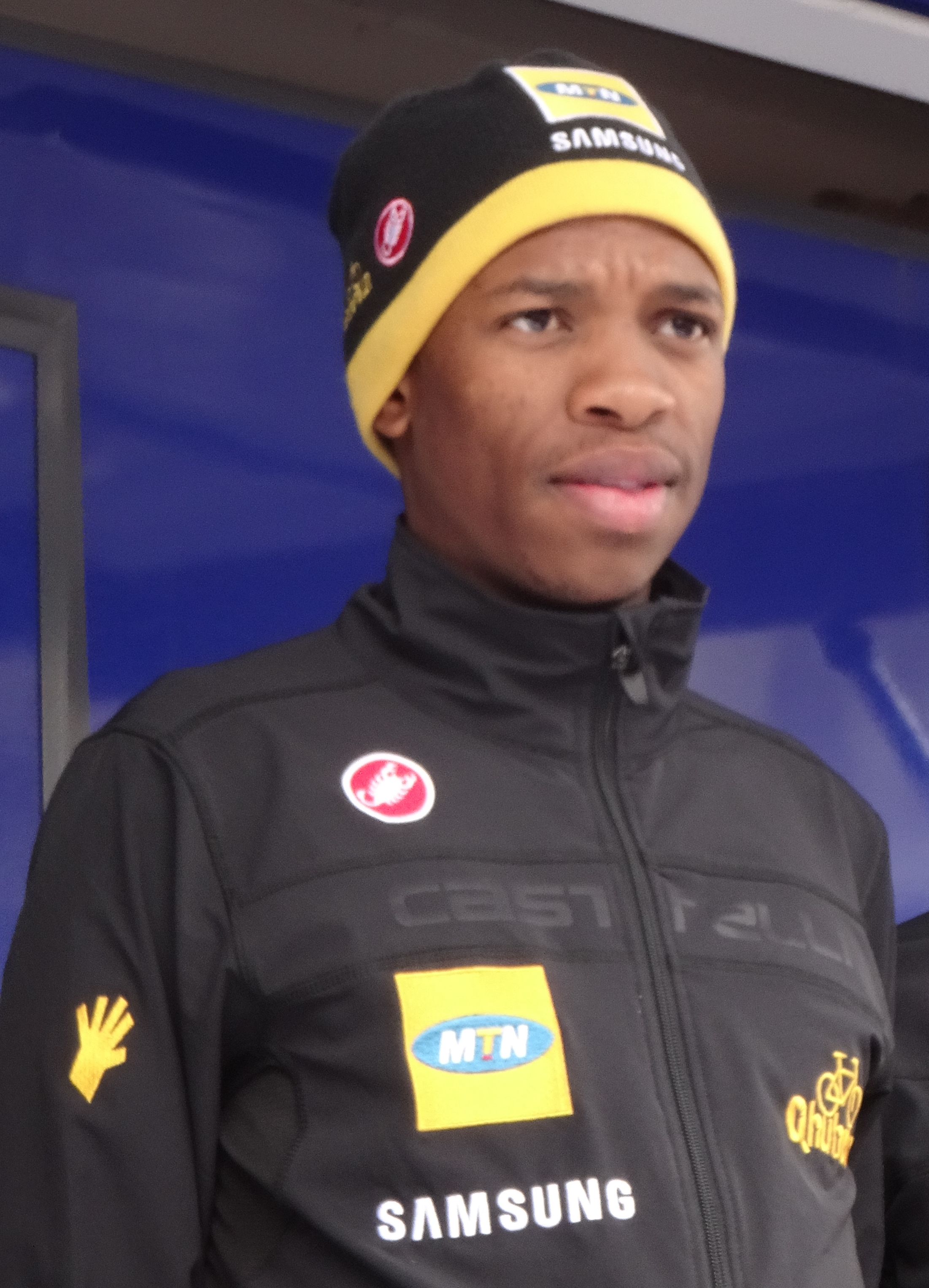
- Jim at the 2014 Four Days of Dunkirk

Personal information
- Full name: Songezo Jim
- Born: September 17, 1990 (age 36) Umtata, Transkei

Cycling career
- Sport: Cycling
- Discipline: Road
- Role: Rider

Amateur team
- 2018: Sampada Cycling Team

Professional teams
- 2011: Team Bonitas
- 2012–2016: MTN–Qhubeka
- 2017: Kuwait–Cartucho.es
- 2019: ProTouch

Songezo Jim (born September 17, 1990 in Umtata) is a South African cyclist, who last rode for UCI Continental team ProTouch. He was named in the start list for the 2015 Vuelta a España, becoming the first black South African rider to compete in the race. He was named in the start list for the 2016 Giro d'Italia.

== Major results ==
2012
African Road Championships

3rd Under-23 road race
6th Road race

2013
4th Overall La Tropicale Amissa Bongo

=== Grand Tour general classification results timeline ===
Grand Tour	2015	2016
Giro d'Italia	—	144
Tour de France	—	—
Vuelta a España	137	—

Legend
—	Did not compete
DNF	Did not finish
