= 2015 Vuelta a España =

70th edition of the Vuelta a España

2015 UCI World Tour, race 22 of 28
- Map of the 2015 Vuelta a España route, from Marbella to Madrid. (stage courses in red)

Race details
- Dates: 22 August – 13 September
- Stages: 21
- Distance: 3,358.1 km (2,086.6 mi)
- Winning time: 85h 36' 13"

Results
Jersey awarded to the overall winner	Winner	Fabio Aru (ITA)	(Astana)
	Second	Joaquim Rodríguez (ESP)	(Team Katusha)
	Third	Rafał Majka (POL)	(Tinkoff–Saxo)
Jersey awarded to the points classification winner	Points	Alejandro Valverde (ESP)	(Movistar Team)
Jersey awarded to the mountains classification winner	Mountains	Omar Fraile (ESP)	(Caja Rural–Seguros RGA)
Jersey awarded to the combination classification winner	Combination	Joaquim Rodríguez (ESP)	(Team Katusha)
	Combativity	Tom Dumoulin (NED)	(Team Giant–Alpecin)
	Team	(Spain) Movistar Team	

The 2015 Vuelta a España was a three-week Grand Tour cycling race. The race was the 70th edition of the Vuelta a España and took place principally in Spain, although two stages took place partly or wholly in Andorra, and was the 22nd race in the 2015 UCI World Tour. The 3,358.1-kilometre (2,086.6 mi) race included 21 stages, beginning in Marbella on 22 August 2015 and finishing in Madrid on 13 September. It was won by Fabio Aru (Astana Pro Team), with Joaquim Rodríguez (Team Katusha) second and Rafał Majka (Tinkoff–Saxo) third.

The early leaders of the race were Esteban Chaves (Orica–GreenEDGE) and Tom Dumoulin (Team Giant–Alpecin), who exchanged the leader's red jersey several times during the first ten days of racing, with both riders winning summit finishes in the first week. Aru took over the race lead following the mountainous Stage 11, which took place entirely within Andorra. He kept his lead for five stages as the race entered the mountains of northern Spain, but lost it to Rodríguez on Stage 16. Dumoulin took the lead back on Stage 17 – the race's only individual time trial – with Aru three seconds behind in second place. Aru attacked throughout the final stages and, on the penultimate day, finally dropped Dumoulin, who fell to sixth place overall. Aru therefore took the first Grand Tour victory of his career.

The points classification was decided during the final stage and was won by Alejandro Valverde (Movistar Team), while Rodriguez won the combination classification. The mountains classification was won by Omar Fraile (Caja Rural–Seguros RGA). Dumoulin won the combativity award, while Movistar won the team prize.

== Teams ==
The seventeen UCI WorldTeams were automatically invited and obliged to attend the race. The organiser of the Vuelta, Unipublic, was also able to invite five UCI Professional Continental teams – the second tier of professional cycling teams – as wildcards. These were announced on 20 March 2015. Caja Rural–Seguros RGA, the only Spanish-registered Professional Continental team, was one of those invited, along with two French teams, Cofidis and Team Europcar. MTN–Qhubeka were invited for the second consecutive year after also securing their first ever entry into the Tour de France. The final team to be invited was Colombia. One prominent team to miss out on an entry was UnitedHealthcare.

The team presentation took place in Benahavís on the evening before the first stage. The number of riders allowed per squad was nine, therefore the start list contained a total of 198 riders. The riders represented 37 different countries, with the largest numbers coming from France (30), Spain (27) and Italy (20). The average age of riders in the Vuelta was 29.13 years, ranging from the 20-year-old Matej Mohorič (Cannondale–Garmin) to the 38-year-old Haimar Zubeldia (Trek Factory Racing).

The teams entering the race were:

World Tour teams

- AG2R La Mondiale
- Astana
- BMC Racing Team
- Cannondale–Garmin
- Etixx–Quick-Step
- FDJ
- Team Giant–Alpecin
- IAM Cycling
- Team Katusha
- Lampre–Merida
- LottoNL–Jumbo
- Lotto–Soudal
- Movistar Team
- Orica–GreenEDGE
- Team Sky
- Tinkoff–Saxo
- Trek Factory Racing

Professional Continental teams

- Caja Rural–Seguros RGA
- Cofidis
- Colombia
- Team Europcar
- MTN–Qhubeka

== Pre-race favorites ==
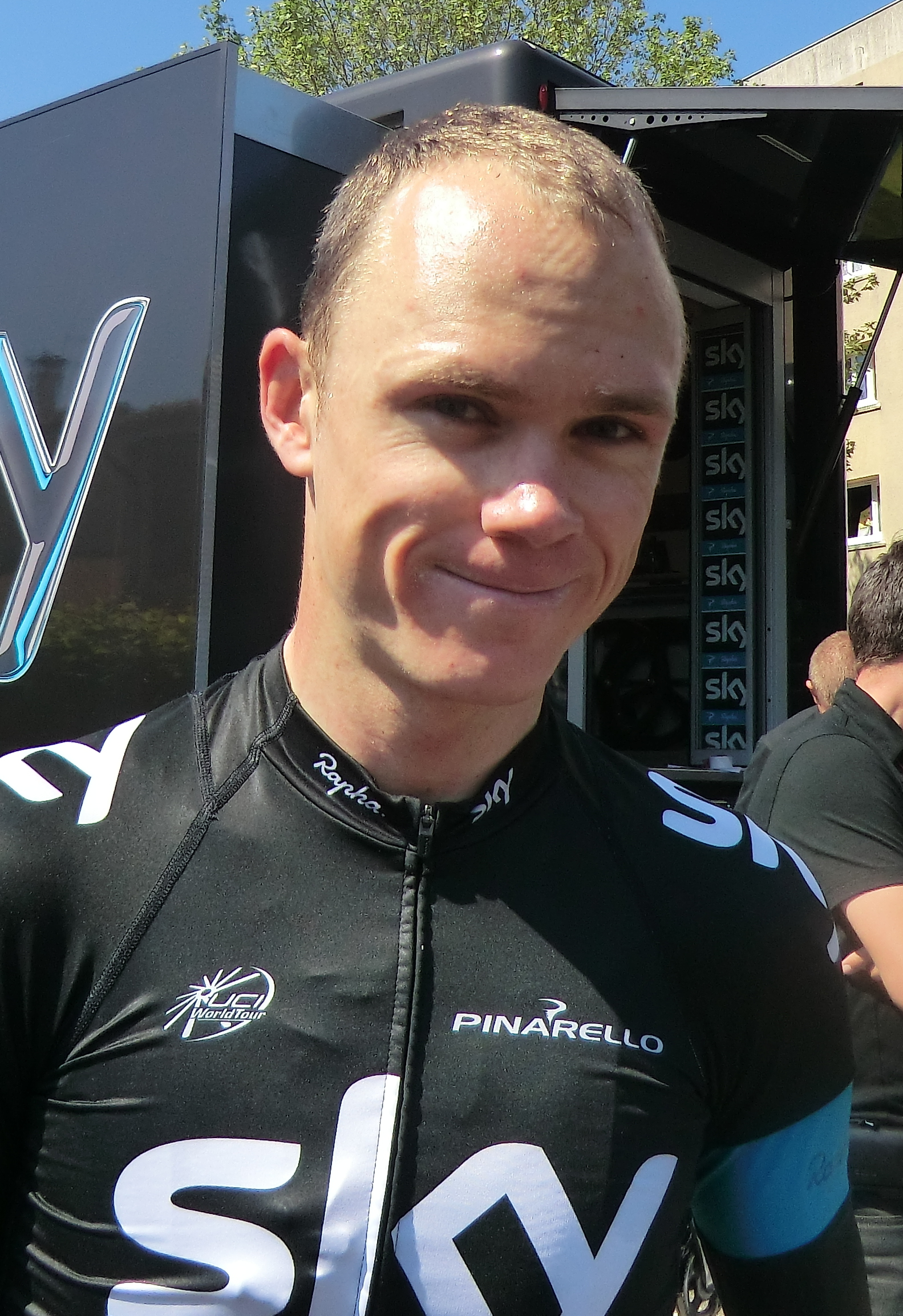
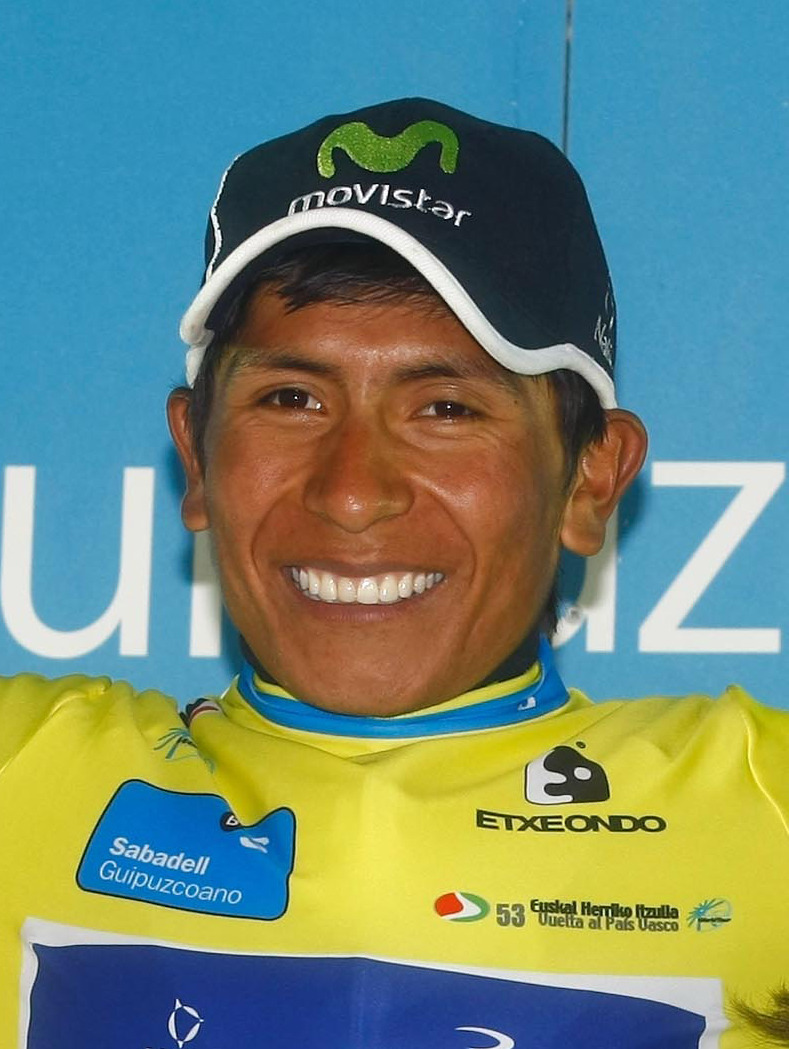
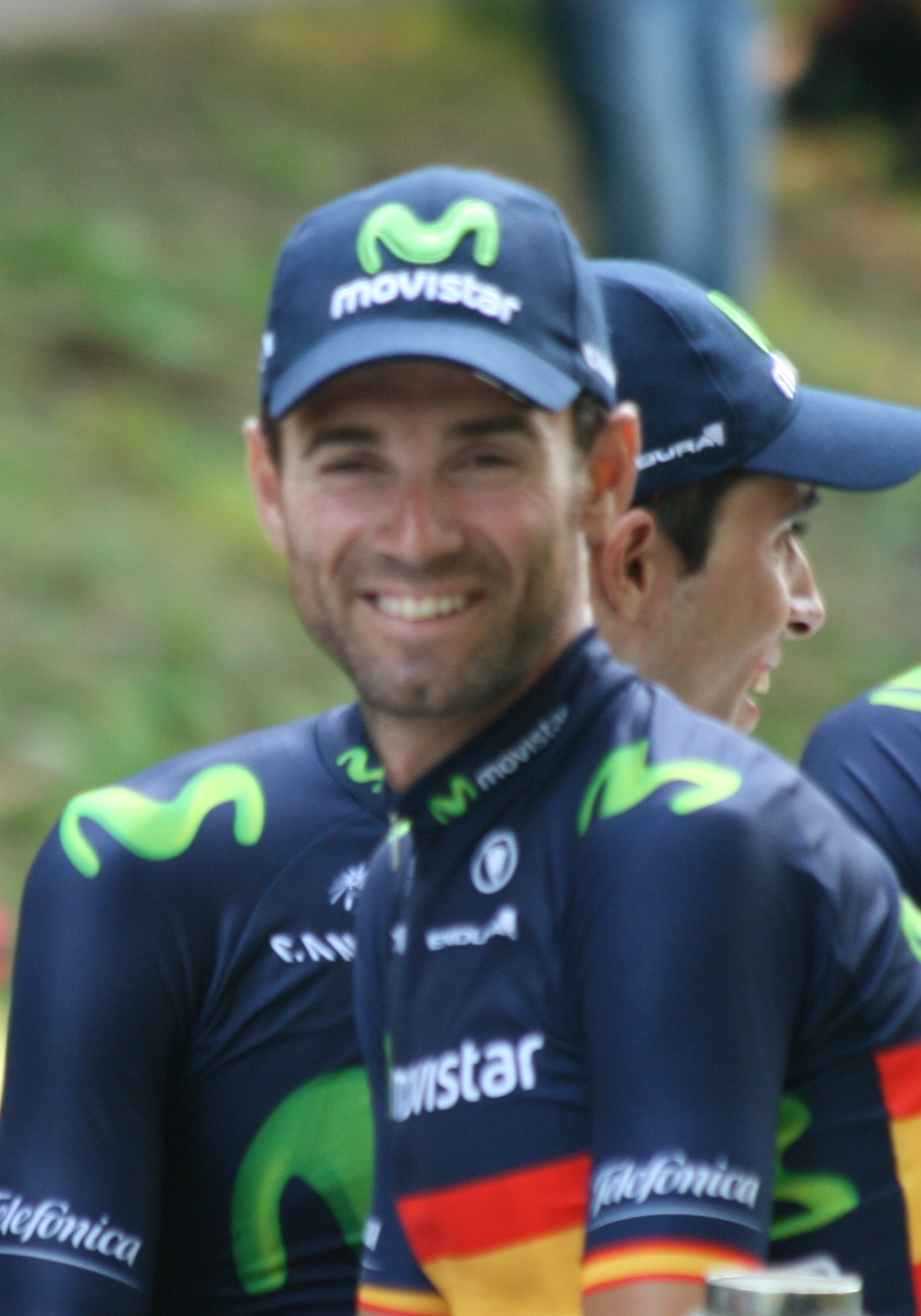
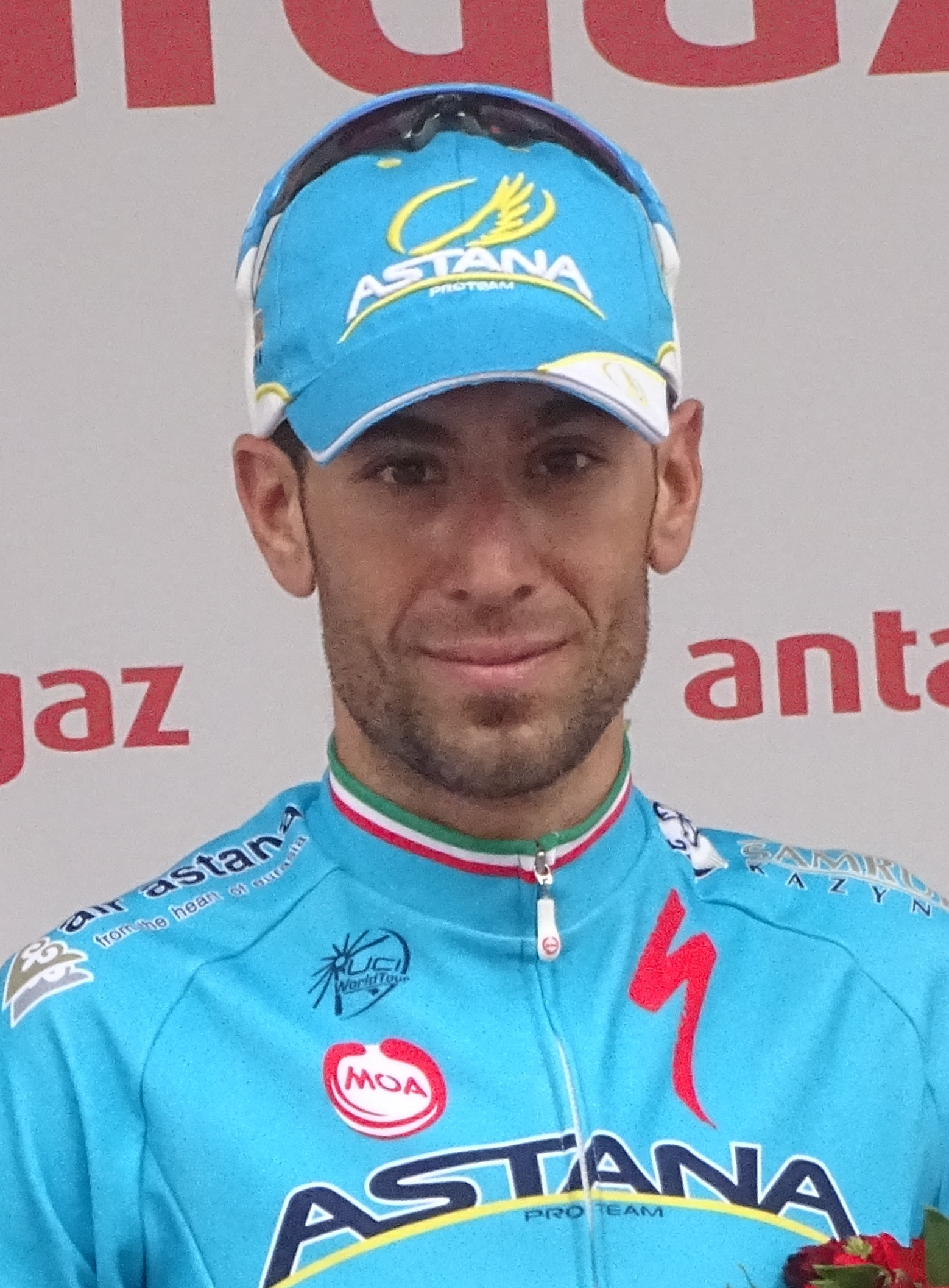
The top four riders from the 2015 Tour de France, favourites for the general classification. Clockwise, from upper left: Chris Froome, Nairo Quintana, Vincenzo Nibali, and Alejandro Valverde.

The top four riders from the 2015 Tour de France all chose to start the Vuelta. These were Chris Froome (Team Sky), Nairo Quintana and Alejandro Valverde (both Movistar Team) and Vincenzo Nibali (Astana), all of whom had previously won Grand Tours. The most notable absentee from among the general classification contenders was Alberto Contador (Tinkoff–Saxo), the winner of the 2014 Vuelta. Oleg Tinkov, the owner of the Tinkoff-Saxo team, had challenged Contador, Froome, Nibali and Quintana to attempt to ride all three Grand Tours in 2015; none of the riders took up the challenge. Froome, Nibali and Quintana all declined to ride the Giro and, as Contador was attempting to win both the Giro d'Italia and the Tour, he did not aim to ride the Vuelta. Valverde and Nibali were the only two previous winners of the race to start the 2015 edition.

Froome, who had been second in the 2011 and 2014 Vueltas, had had a strong season, with victories in the Vuelta a Andalucía, the Critérium du Dauphiné and the Tour de France. He was attempting to become the first rider since Bernard Hinault in 1978 to win both the Tour and the Vuelta in the same season, though it was expected that he would be tired following his victory in the Tour. The individual time trial was expected to favour Froome, who is strong in the discipline. Before the race, however, Froome was uncertain about his form and his ability to win the race. Quintana's only stage race victory of the season had come in the Tirreno–Adriatico, but he had performed strongly in the Alps in the Tour's final stages, and the mountainous route of the Vuelta was expected to suit him.

Vincenzo Nibali, who had won the Vuelta in 2010, had struggled in the opening stages of the Tour, but had recovered to take a stage victory in the final week. The Astana team also included Fabio Aru and Mikel Landa, second and third respectively at the Giro d'Italia; while this made a strong team, it was unclear which rider would be favoured by the team and given the assistance of his teammates. There was a similar situation at Movistar, as Valverde, who had won the Vuelta in 2009 and had finished on the podium on four other occasions, was also in strong form and was well suited to the course. Also among the general classification contenders were Joaquim Rodríguez (Team Katusha), Rafał Majka (Tinkoff–Saxo) and Tejay van Garderen (BMC Racing Team).

Other notable riders to take part in the race included several sprinters. One of these was Peter Sagan (Tinkoff–Saxo), four times the winner of the points classification in the Tour de France and winner of three stages in the 2011 Vuelta, who was preparing for the World Championships road race the following month. Sagan was considered particularly strong on the easier uphill finishes in the first week. John Degenkolb (Team Giant–Alpecin) had won four stages and the points classification in 2014 as well as five stages in 2012. Nacer Bouhanni (Cofidis), who had crashed out of the Tour, was expected to compete with Degenkolb in the flat sprints.

== Route and stages ==
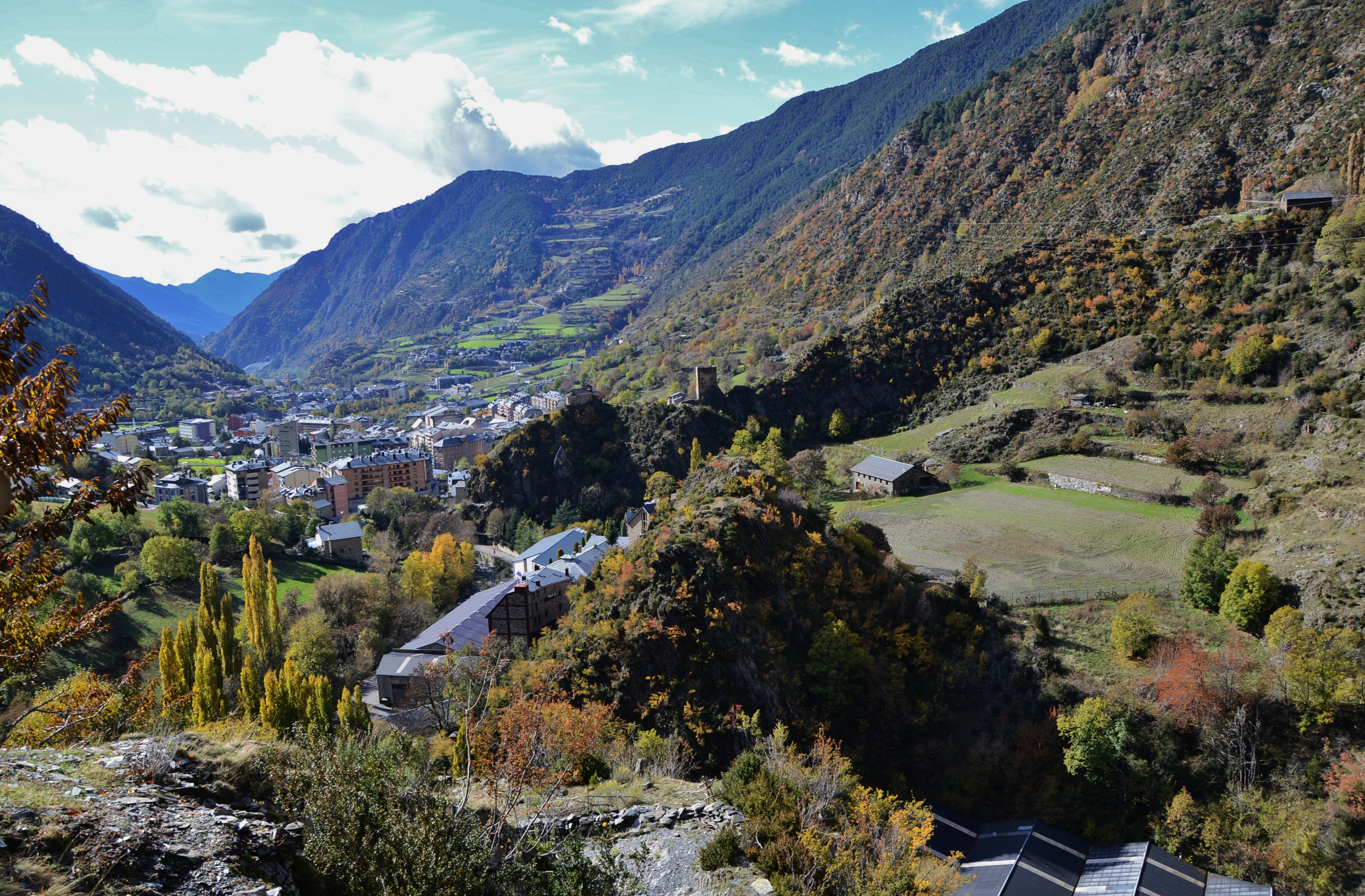
Stage 11, a very difficult mountain stage, took place in Andorra and finished in the mountains around Encamp.

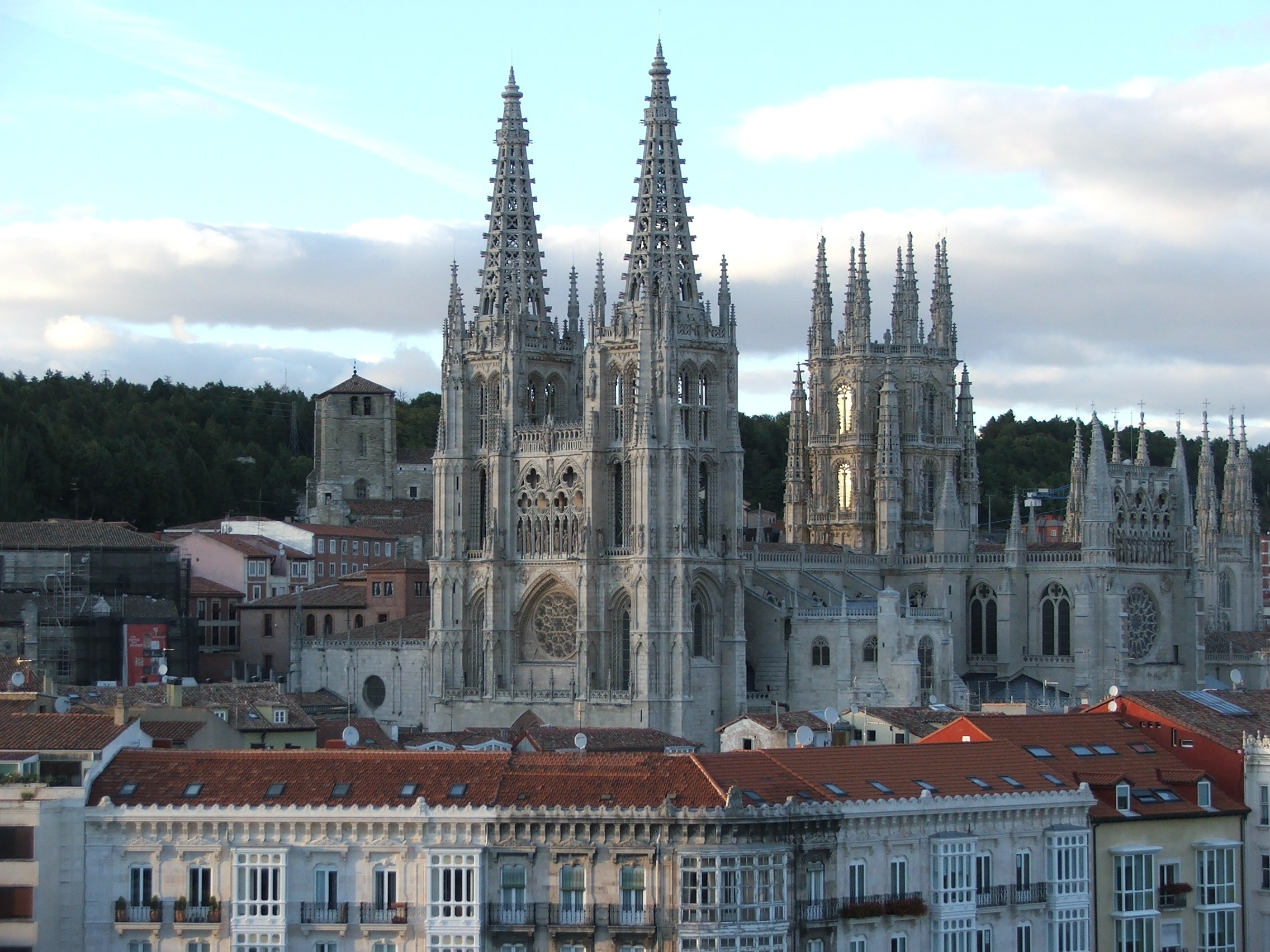
The flat individual time trial on Stage 17 finished next to Burgos Cathedral.

The first announcement of the route for the 2015 Vuelta a España came in October 2014, when Javier Guillén, the race director, announced that the first stage would take place in Puerto Banús near Marbella on 22 August. It had been decided that the stage would be either an individual time trial or a team time trial. More news came the following month, when Guillén revealed that he had been involved in conversations with Chris Froome and had promised him that the race would include a fairly flat individual time trial of around 40 kilometres (25 mi). He also said that the race would feature "explosive finals and summit finishes". The official route announcement came on 10 January 2015 in Torremolinos, along the coast from the start of the first stage in Puerto Banús.

The first five stages took place in and around Andalusia in southern Spain; the 2014 Vuelta had also started there. The first stage was a team time trial along the coast from Puerto Banús to Marbella. The next four stages were fairly flat, although Stage 2 finished on a moderately difficult climb. The sixth stage started in Córdoba and finished in Sierra de Cazorla in Jaén on another moderately difficult climb. The seventh stage then returned to Andalusia for the first major difficulty of the race: the first-category summit finish at La Alpujarra. The route then continued along the eastern coast of Spain, with a medium-mountain seventh stage and another first-category summit finish at Benitachell on Stage 9. There was one more medium-mountain stage on Stage 10, taking the riders into the Province of Castellón. This was followed by a transfer that took the riders into Andorra for a three-day spell, beginning with the first rest day. The eleventh stage took place entirely in Andorra; though it was only 138 kilometres (86 mi) in length, it included six categorised climbs, including a summit finish, and was described by Eusebio Unzué (the manager of the Movistar team) as "the toughest Vuelta stage that he has seen in more than 30 years". Stage 12 took the riders back into Spain for a fairly flat stage, before three consecutive stages with summit finishes. These took place in the mountains of Cantabria and Asturias and were followed by the race's second rest day. The final week of the race included no summit finishes: the first stage was a 38.7-kilometre (24.0 mi) individual time trial in Burgos and was then followed by three mixed stages that took the riders nearer to the final stage of the race, a sprint stage in Madrid. For the first time, the race organisers also held a women's race on the same day as the final stage, using the same circuit. This race – called La Madrid Challenge by La Vuelta – was won by Shelley Olds.

The 2015 Vuelta included nine summit finishes, none of which had previously been used in the race. Unusually, the principal difficulties of the race came in the first two weeks, including all nine summit finishes. It was therefore expected that the climbers would need to attack early in the race, in order to build up a significant lead ahead of the lengthy time trial on Stage 17. The race organisers also hoped to encourage sprinters to take part by including seven fairly flat stages.

Each road stage (that is, all the stages except the team time trial and the individual time trial) included an intermediate sprint. This was a point where the leading riders in the stage were awarded points in the points classification and time bonuses in the general classification. Many of the stages also included climbs that were categorised by the race organisers according to their difficulty; the leading riders over each of these climbs were awarded points in the mountains classification, with the most difficult climbs earning the most points.

In the days before the beginning of the race, there was controversy over the first stage. On arriving at the start, the teams discovered that the route used a variety of road surfaces, crossed sandy sections and included several ramps. As a result, the race organisers decided to neutralise the stage: the teams therefore competed only for the stage victory and for the team classification, not for the general classification.

Stage characteristics and winners
Stage	Date	Course	Distance	Type	Winner
1	22 August	Puerto Banús to Marbella	7.4 km (4.6 mi)	Team time trial	(United States) BMC Racing Team
2	23 August	Alhaurín de la Torre to Caminito del Rey	158.7 km (98.6 mi)	Medium-mountain stage	Esteban Chaves (COL)
3	24 August	Mijas to Málaga	158.4 km (98.4 mi)	Flat stage	Peter Sagan (SVK)
4	25 August	Estepona to Vejer de la Frontera	209.6 km (130.2 mi)	Hilly stage	Alejandro Valverde (ESP)
5	26 August	Rota to Alcalá de Guadaíra	167.3 km (104.0 mi)	Flat stage	Caleb Ewan (AUS)
6	27 August	Córdoba to Sierra de Cazorla	200.3 km (124.5 mi)	Medium-mountain stage	Esteban Chaves (COL)
7	28 August	Jódar to La Alpujarra	191.1 km (118.7 mi)	Mountain stage	Bert-Jan Lindeman (NED)
8	29 August	Puebla de Don Fadrique to Murcia	182.5 km (113.4 mi)	Flat stage	Jasper Stuyven (BEL)
9	30 August	Torrevieja to Cumbre del Sol, Benitachell	168.3 km (104.6 mi)	Medium-mountain stage	Tom Dumoulin (NED)
10	31 August	Valencia to Castellón de la Plana	146.6 km (91.1 mi)	Flat stage	Kristian Sbaragli (ITA)
	1 September	Andorra la Vella		Rest day	
11	2 September	Andorra la Vella to Cortals d'Encamp	138 km (86 mi)	Mountain stage	Mikel Landa (ESP)
12	3 September	Escaldes-Engordany, Andorra to Lleida	173 km (107 mi)	Flat stage	Danny van Poppel (NED)
13	4 September	Calatayud to Tarazona	178 km (111 mi)	Medium-mountain stage	Nelson Oliveira (POR)
14	5 September	Vitoria-Gasteiz to Alto Campoo, Fuente del Chivo	215 km (134 mi)	Mountain stage	Alessandro De Marchi (ITA)
15	6 September	Comillas to Sotres, Cabrales	175.8 km (109.2 mi)	Mountain stage	Joaquim Rodríguez (ESP)
16	7 September	Luarca to Ermita del Alba, Quirós	185 km (115 mi)	Mountain stage	Fränk Schleck (LUX)
	8 September	Burgos		Rest day	
17	9 September	Burgos	38.7 km (24.0 mi)	Individual time trial	Tom Dumoulin (NED)
18	10 September	Roa de Duero to Riaza	204 km (127 mi)	Medium-mountain stage	Nicolas Roche (IRL)
19	11 September	Medina del Campo to Ávila	185.8 km (115.5 mi)	Hilly stage	Alexis Gougeard (FRA)
20	12 September	San Lorenzo de El Escorial to Cercedilla	175.8 km (109.2 mi)	Mountain stage	Rubén Plaza (ESP)
21	13 September	Alcalá de Henares to Madrid	98.8 km (61.4 mi)	Flat stage	John Degenkolb (GER)
Total			3,358.1 km (2,087 mi)		

== Race overview ==
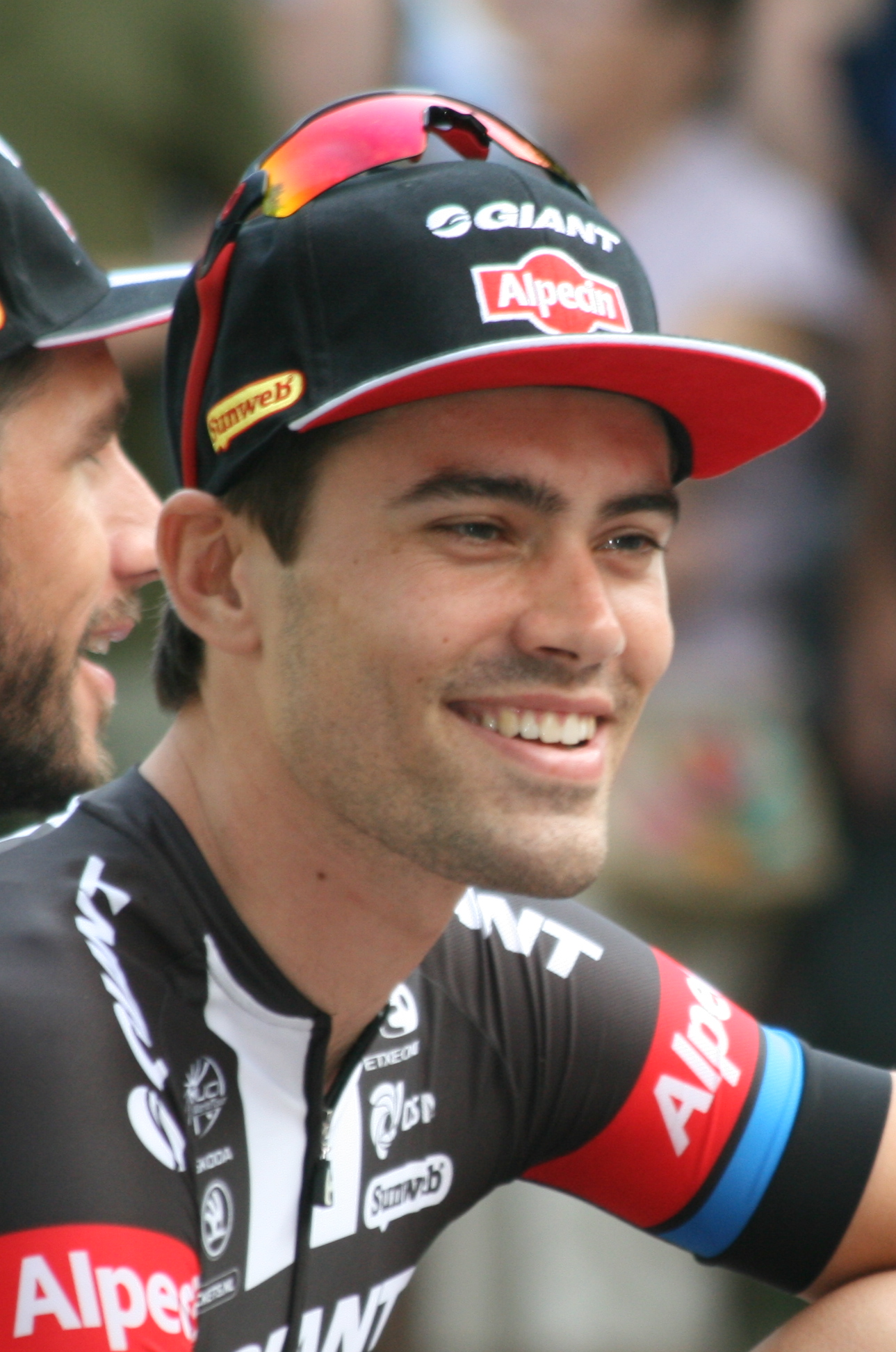
Tom Dumoulin (Team Giant–Alpecin) held the leader's red jersey after stages 5, 9, 10, 17, 18 and 19 (photographed at the 2015 Tour de France).

The team time trial was won by BMC Racing Team and Peter Velits took the red jersey as the first rider across the line. Since the stage had been neutralised for the general classification, all 198 riders began the second stage on the same time. The stage finished on a moderate climb, where Esteban Chaves (Orica–GreenEDGE) attacked early and took both the stage victory and the lead of the race. A major crash in the final 30 kilometres (19 mi) brought down several riders and most riders in the peloton (the main group) were held up, including Fabio Aru and Vincenzo Nibali (Astana). Aru quickly rejoined the peloton; Nibali was forced to chase for a long time. After the stage, a video emerged of Nibali holding on to his team car as it accelerated him back to the peloton. Nibali was therefore fined and excluded from the race.

The next stage was a moderately difficult stage that ended in a bunch sprint. Peter Sagan won his first Grand Tour stage in over two years ahead of Nacer Bouhanni (Cofidis) and John Degenkolb (Giant-Alpecin). The fourth stage again included an uphill finish. This stage was also decided in a sprint finish, this time won by Alejandro Valverde. Sagan, who came second, took over the lead of the points classification. A third consecutive bunch sprint came on the fifth stage, which ended on a slight incline. The relatively straightforward stage was won by Caleb Ewan (Orica–GreenEDGE), who was riding his first Grand Tour, ahead of Degenkolb and Sagan. There were splits in the peloton at the finish; Chaves lost six seconds to Tom Dumoulin (Team Giant–Alpecin), who therefore took over the red jersey of the race leader by one second. This lead did not last long. The sixth stage finished on another moderate climb. Chaves again attacked early in the climb and took his second stage victory, with Dan Martin (Cannondale–Garmin) second and Dumoulin third. Chaves therefore took back the red jersey.

The seventh stage was the most significant uphill finish of the race so far, finishing on the climb of the Alto de Capileira. It was won by Bert-Jan Lindeman (LottoNL–Jumbo) from the breakaway. Most of the general classification favourites finished together, though Fabio Aru gained seven seconds in the final kilometre and Chris Froome lost nearly half a minute. The following stage was a moderately difficult stage: it was too difficult for the pure sprinters to reach the finish line with the main group of riders, but not difficult enough to create gaps between those riding for the overall victory. The most notable event was a large crash 50 kilometres (31 mi) from the finish. Four riders were immediately forced to withdraw from the race with injuries, including Dan Martin, who had been in the top ten. The stage was won in a reduced bunch sprint by Jasper Stuyven (Trek Factory Racing), who had been among the riders injured in the earlier crash. He was forced to withdraw from the race after the stage with a broken scaphoid. Stage 9 ended with a difficult climb. There was a series of attacks on the early part of the mountain, with many riders dropped from the lead group. Tom Dumoulin eventually took a solo win in the stage, two seconds ahead of Chris Froome, and took back the red jersey as Chaves lost significant time. Froome had originally been dropped, but rode at a steady tempo and came close to the stage victory. Stage 10, the final stage before the first rest day, ended in another bunch sprint, which was won by Kristian Sbaragli (MTN–Qhubeka).

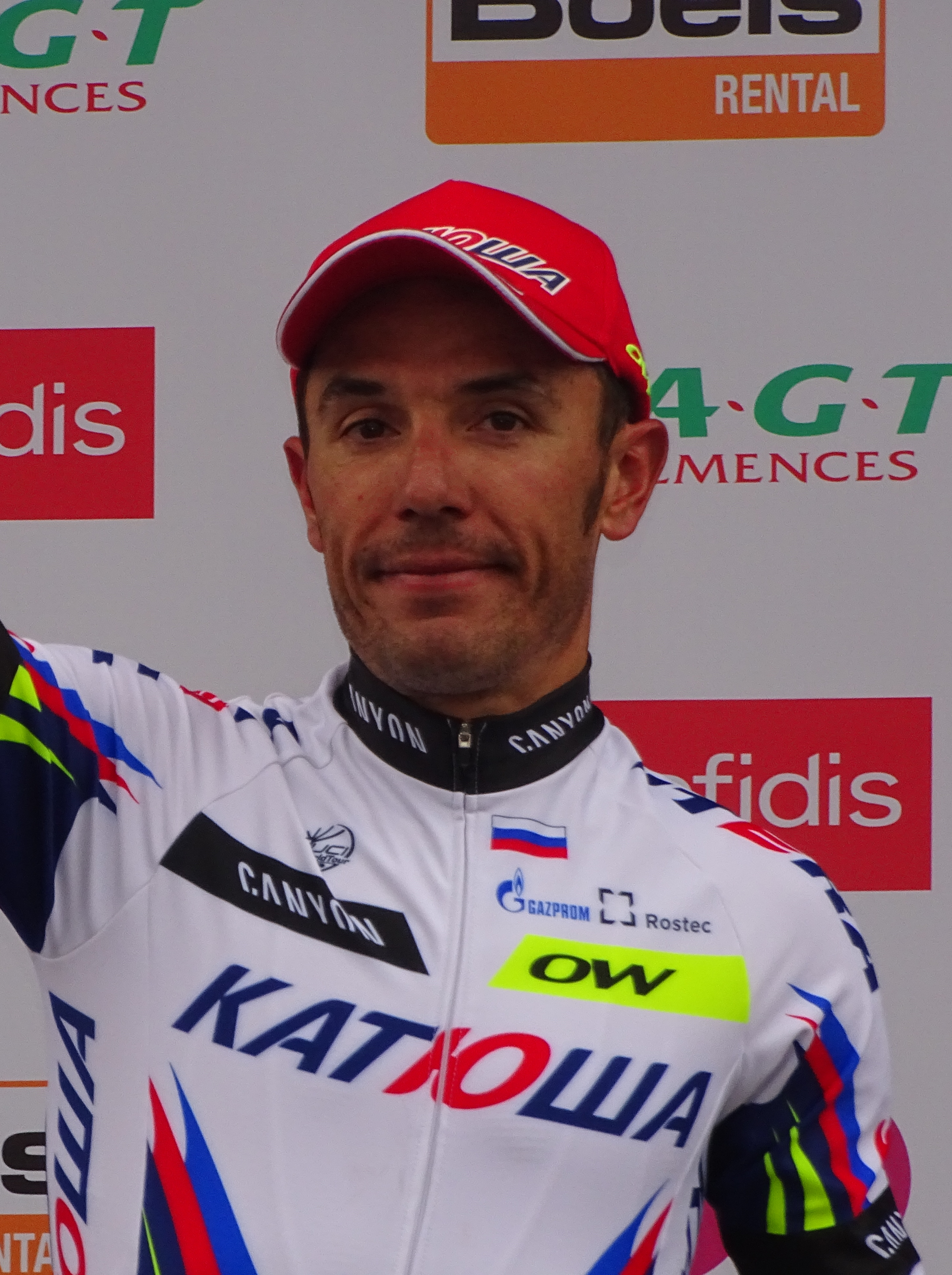
Joaquim Rodríguez (Team Katusha) took the lead at the end of Stage 16 after taking time throughout the second week (photographed at the 2015 Liège–Bastogne–Liège).

The eleventh stage, the first after the rest day, was the difficult stage in Andorra, with six difficult climbs and almost no flat roads. The stage was won from a breakaway by Mikel Landa (Astana). Fabio Aru, Landa's teammate, took second place and moved into the race lead. Chris Froome fell from his bike at the beginning of the stage and lost several minutes to Aru; the following morning it was revealed that he had broken his foot in the fall and he withdrew from the race. Nairo Quintana also lost several minutes on the stage. The following stage, which took the riders from Andorra back into Spain, was won in a sprint by Danny van Poppel (Trek Factory Racing) after the day's breakaway was caught in the final kilometre. Van Poppel won the stage despite puncturing his tyre with 10 kilometres (6.2 mi) remaining. The thirteenth stage – the last one before a series of three consecutive summit finishes – was won from a breakaway by Nelson Oliveira (Lampre–Merida), with no impact on the general classification.

The first of the three summit finishes – Stage 14 – was won by Alessandro De Marchi (BMC Racing Team), who had been in the day's breakaway. Quintana gained several seconds back, while Aru, Rodríguez, Chaves and Majka all gained time on Dumoulin. Rodríguez attacked strongly on the final climb to win Stage 15 and gained time on all his rivals, putting himself just one second behind Aru. Dumoulin lost further time to Aru, Majka and Chaves. The final stage with a summit finish was Stage 16: it was a difficult stage including seven climbs and was won by Fränk Schleck (Trek Factory Racing). On the final climb, Rodríguez gained two seconds on Aru in the final metres to put himself into the race lead for the final rest day, while Dumoulin lost more time and was nearly two minutes back.

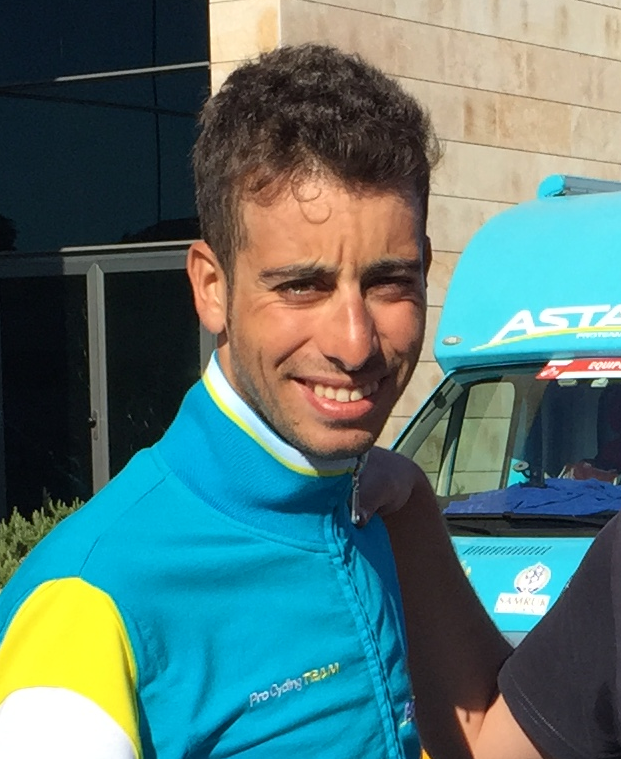
Fabio Aru (Astana) regained the race lead on the penultimate stage of the race.

After the rest day came the race's individual time trial. It was won by Dumoulin, who was more than a minute ahead of all the other riders in the race. His time was good enough to put him into the overall race lead. Aru rode strongly, and was only three seconds behind Dumoulin in the general classification after the stage. Rodríguez lost over three minutes to Dumoulin. Majka also lost significant time to Aru and Dumoulin and fell to fourth place.

Following the time trial, there were three mountainous stages, although none of them had a summit finish. All three were won by riders from breakaways. Nicolas Roche (Sky) won Stage 18, beating Haimar Zubeldia (Trek Factory Racing) in a two-man sprint. After his team had put pressure on the peloton through the whole stage, Aru attacked Dumoulin six times on the final climb, and Valverde put in three more attacks. Dumoulin, however, did not lose any time and retained his three-second lead. Stage 19 ended with a short, cobbled climb into Ávila. It was won by Alexis Gougeard (AG2R La Mondiale), who had escaped from the breakaway group on the previous climb. The day's racing also produced another crash: this time Aru fell to the ground. Although he had to make several trips to the medical car, he did not seem seriously injured. At the end of the stage, Dumoulin used his team to put him in a strong position for the cobbled climb and he increased his lead over Aru to six seconds. Stage 20 was the final day of mountainous terrain, including four difficult climbs. It was won by Rubén Plaza (Lampre-Mérida) after a 117-kilometre (73 mi) solo breakaway that lasted over three hours. Aru's Astana team rode hard in the second half of the stage and, with a strong team effort, they were eventually able to drop Dumoulin on the penultimate climb of the day; he dropped further back on the final climb and lost nearly four minutes, dropping to sixth place overall. Quintana and Majka gained nearly a minute on the other general classification rivals. This meant that Aru took the race lead, with Rodríguez second and Majka third.

The final stage of the race was a flat stage that finished in Madrid. It was won in a sprint by Degenkolb. During the stage, Valverde took advantage of a puncture for Rodríguez and won the intermediate sprint to give him the points jersey. Although Aru lost a little time in a split in the peloton at the finish line, the rest of the standings were unchanged. Aru therefore won the race, his first Grand Tour victory.

== Classification leadership ==
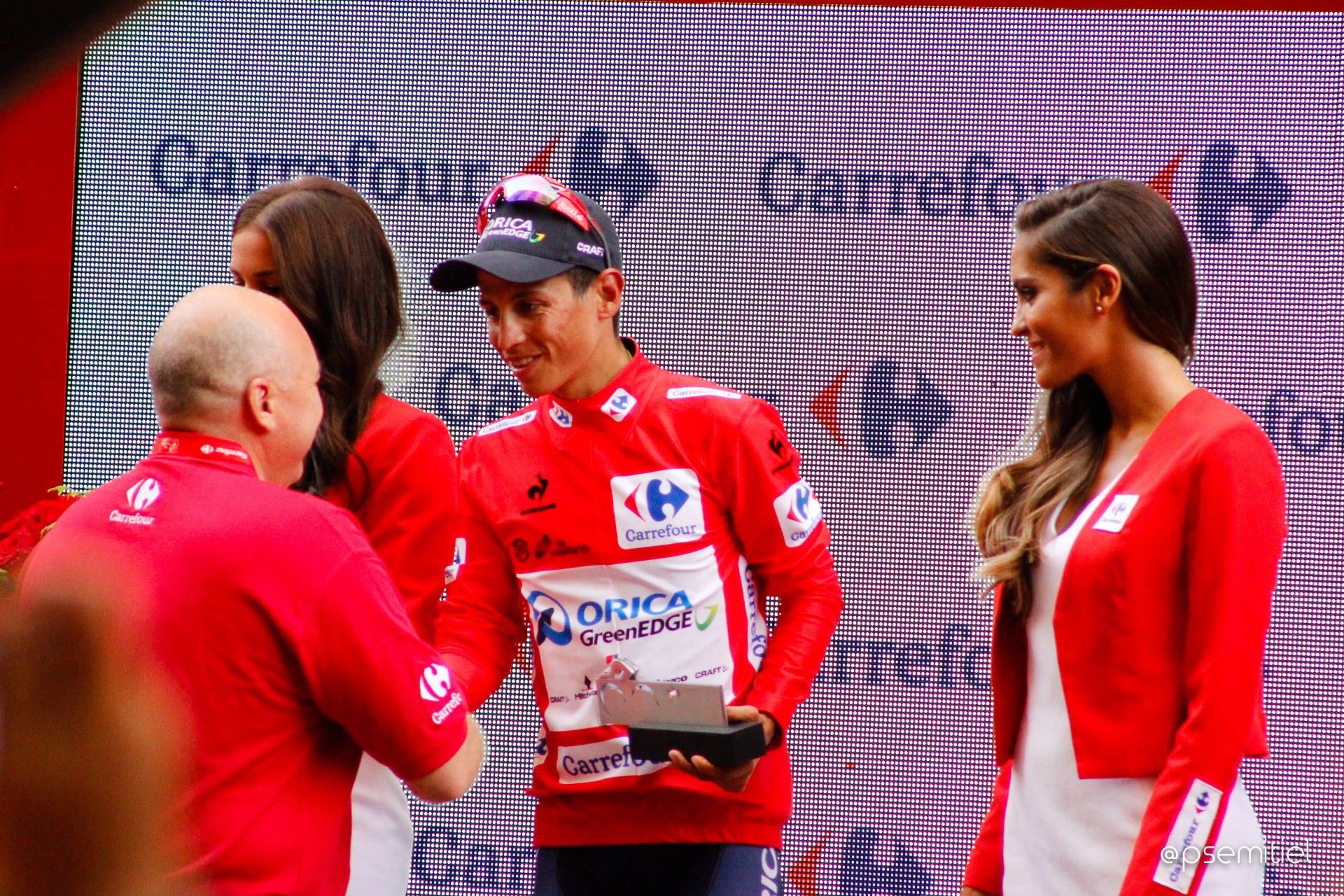
Esteban Chaves (Orica–GreenEDGE) being awarded the red jersey of the general classification leader following Stage 8

The 2015 Vuelta a España included four principal classifications. The first of these was the general classification, which was calculated by adding up each rider's times on each stage and applying the relevant time bonuses. These were 10 seconds for the stage winner, 6 seconds for the rider in second, and 4 seconds for the rider in third, and 3, 2 and 1 seconds for the first three riders at each intermediate sprint; no bonuses were awarded on the time trial stages. The rider with the lowest cumulative time was the winner of the general classification and was considered the overall winner of the Vuelta. The rider leading the classification wore a red jersey.

The second classification was the points classification. Riders were awarded points for finishing in the top fifteen places on each stage and in the top three at each intermediate sprint. The first rider at each stage finish was awarded 25 points, the second 20 points, the third 16 points, the fourth 14 points, the fifth 12 points, the sixth 10 points, down to 1 point for the rider in fifteenth. At the intermediate sprints, the first three riders won 4, 2 and 1 points respectively. The rider with the most points won the classification and wore a green jersey.

Mountain points
Category	1st	2nd	3rd	4th	5th	6th
Cima Alberto Fernández	20	15	10	6	4	2
Special category	15	10	6	4	2	
First category	10	6	4	2	1	
Second category	5	3	1			
Third category	3	2	1			

The third classification was the mountains classification. Most stages of the race included one or more categorised climbs. Stages were categorised as third-, second-, first- and special-category, with the more difficult climbs rated higher. The most difficult climb of the race, the Alto Ermita de Alba on Stage 16, was given its own category as the Cima Alberto Fernández. Points were awarded for the first riders across the summit of each climb; the rider with the most accumulated points won the classification and wore a white jersey with blue polka dots.

The final individual classification was the combination classification. This was calculated by adding up each rider's position on the other three individual classifications. The rider with the lowest cumulative score was the winner of the classification and wore a white jersey.

The final classification was a team classification. This was calculated by adding together the times of each team's best three riders on each stage. The team with the lowest cumulative time was the winner of the classification. There was also a combativity prize awarded on each stage; three riders were chosen on each stage by a race jury to recognise the rider "who displayed the most courageous effort". There was then a public vote to decide which rider should be awarded the prize; the rider wore a red dossard (race number) the following day. An identical procedure took place on the final stage to decide the most combative rider of the whole Vuelta.

Classification leadership by stage
Stage	Winner	General classification	Points classification	Mountains classification	Combination classification	Team classification	Combativity award
1	BMC Racing Team	Peter Velits	not awarded	not awarded	not awarded	BMC Racing Team	Cameron Meyer
2	Esteban Chaves	Esteban Chaves	Esteban Chaves	Esteban Chaves	Esteban Chaves	Team Sky	José Gonçalves
3	Peter Sagan	Esteban Chaves	Esteban Chaves	Omar Fraile	Esteban Chaves	Team Sky	Omar Fraile
4	Alejandro Valverde	Esteban Chaves	Peter Sagan	Omar Fraile	Esteban Chaves	Team Sky	Brayan Ramírez
5	Caleb Ewan	Tom Dumoulin	Peter Sagan	Omar Fraile	Esteban Chaves	Team Sky	Iljo Keisse
6	Esteban Chaves	Esteban Chaves	Peter Sagan	Omar Fraile	Esteban Chaves	Team Sky	Miguel Ángel Rubiano
7	Bert-Jan Lindeman	Esteban Chaves	Esteban Chaves	Omar Fraile	Esteban Chaves	Team Sky	Amets Txurruka
8	Jasper Stuyven	Esteban Chaves	Esteban Chaves	Omar Fraile	Esteban Chaves	Team Sky	Ángel Madrazo
9	Tom Dumoulin	Tom Dumoulin	Esteban Chaves	Omar Fraile	Tom Dumoulin	Team Sky	Omar Fraile
10	Kristian Sbaragli	Tom Dumoulin	Esteban Chaves	Omar Fraile	Tom Dumoulin	Team Sky	Carlos Verona
11	Mikel Landa	Fabio Aru	Esteban Chaves	Omar Fraile	Tom Dumoulin	Team Sky	Mikel Landa
12	Danny van Poppel	Fabio Aru	Esteban Chaves	Omar Fraile	Tom Dumoulin	Team Sky	Maxime Bouet
13	Nelson Oliveira	Fabio Aru	Esteban Chaves	Omar Fraile	Tom Dumoulin	Team Sky	Paweł Poljański
14	Alessandro De Marchi	Fabio Aru	Esteban Chaves	Omar Fraile	Tom Dumoulin	Team Sky	Carlos Quintero
15	Joaquim Rodríguez	Fabio Aru	Joaquim Rodríguez	Omar Fraile	Joaquim Rodríguez	Team Sky	Brayan Ramírez
16	Fränk Schleck	Joaquim Rodríguez	Joaquim Rodríguez	Omar Fraile	Joaquim Rodríguez	Team Sky	Rodolfo Torres
17	Tom Dumoulin	Tom Dumoulin	Joaquim Rodríguez	Omar Fraile	Joaquim Rodríguez	Team Sky	Tom Dumoulin
18	Nicolas Roche	Tom Dumoulin	Joaquim Rodríguez	Omar Fraile	Joaquim Rodríguez	Movistar Team	Ángel Madrazo
19	Alexis Gougeard	Tom Dumoulin	Joaquim Rodríguez	Omar Fraile	Joaquim Rodríguez	Movistar Team	Alexis Gougeard
20	Rubén Plaza	Fabio Aru	Joaquim Rodríguez	Omar Fraile	Joaquim Rodríguez	Movistar Team	Rubén Plaza
21	John Degenkolb	Fabio Aru	Alejandro Valverde	Omar Fraile	Joaquim Rodríguez	Movistar Team	Tom Dumoulin
Final		Fabio Aru	Alejandro Valverde	Omar Fraile	Joaquim Rodríguez	Movistar Team	Tom Dumoulin

- In stage three, Tom Dumoulin, who was second in the points classification, wore the green jersey, because first-placed Esteban Chaves wore the red jersey as leader of the general classification. For the same reason, Walter Pedraza, second in the mountains classification and Nicolas Roche, third in the combination classification (second-placed Dumoulin already wore the green jersey), wore the polka dot jersey and the white jersey respectively.
- In stages four and eight, Peter Sagan, who was second in the points classification, wore the green jersey, because first-placed Esteban Chaves wore the red jersey as leader of the general classification. For the same reason, Tom Dumoulin, second in the combination classification, wore the white jersey.
- In stages five and seven, eight and nine, Tom Dumoulin, who was second in the combination classification, wore the white jersey, because first-placed Esteban Chaves wore the red jersey as leader of the general classification.
- In stage nine, Alejandro Valverde, who was second in the points classification, wore the green jersey, because first-placed Esteban Chaves wore the red jersey as leader of the general classification.
- In stages ten and eleven, Joaquim Rodríguez, who was third in the combination classification, wore the white jersey because first-placed Tom Dumoulin wore the red jersey as leader of the general classification and second-placed Esteban Chaves wore the green jersey as leader of the points classification.
- In stage sixteen, Tom Dumoulin, who was third in the combination classification, wore the white jersey because first-placed Joaquim Rodríguez wore the green jersey as leader of the points classification, and second-placed Fabio Aru wore the red jersey as leader of the general classification.
- In stage seventeen, Esteban Chaves, who was second in the points classification, wore the green jersey because first-placed Joaquim Rodríguez wore the red jersey as leader of the general classification. For the same reason, Fabio Aru, second in the combination classification, wore the white jersey.
- In stages eighteen, nineteen and twenty, Fabio Aru, who was third in the combination classification, wore the white jersey because first-placed Joaquim Rodríguez wore the green jersey as leader of the points classification, and second-placed Tom Dumoulin wore the red jersey as leader of the general classification.
- In stage twenty-one, Tom Dumoulin, who was third in the combination classification, wore the white jersey because first-placed Joaquim Rodríguez wore the green jersey as leader of the points classification, and second-placed Aru wore the red jersey as leader of the general classification.

== Final standings ==
Legend
General classification	Denotes the leader of the general classification	Points classification	Denotes the leader of the points classification
Mountains classification	Denotes the leader of the mountains classification	Combination classification	Denotes the leader of the combination rider classification

=== General classification ===
Final general classification (1–10)
Rank	Rider	Team	Time
1	Fabio Aru (ITA)	Astana	85h 36' 13"
2	Joaquim Rodríguez (ESP)	Team Katusha	+ 57"
3	Rafał Majka (POL)	Tinkoff–Saxo	+ 1' 09"
4	Nairo Quintana (COL)	Movistar Team	+ 1' 42"
5	Esteban Chaves (COL)	Orica–GreenEDGE	+ 3' 10"
6	Tom Dumoulin (NED)	Team Giant–Alpecin	+ 3' 46"
7	Alejandro Valverde (ESP)	Movistar Team	+ 6' 47"
8	Mikel Nieve (ESP)	Team Sky	+ 7' 06"
9	Daniel Moreno (ESP)	Team Katusha	+ 7' 12"
10	Louis Meintjes (RSA)	MTN–Qhubeka	+ 10' 26"

Final general classification (11–158)
Rank	Rider	Team	Time
11	Domenico Pozzovivo (ITA)	AG2R La Mondiale	+ 11' 10"
12	David Arroyo (ESP)	Caja Rural–Seguros RGA	+ 13' 29"
13	Gianluca Brambilla (ITA)	Etixx–Quick-Step	+ 15' 26"
14	Bart De Clercq (BEL)	Lotto–Soudal	+ 16' 34"
15	Romain Sicard (FRA)	Team Europcar	+ 16' 46"
16	Kenny Elissonde (FRA)	FDJ	+ 17' 07"
17	Fabrice Jeandesboz (FRA)	Team Europcar	+ 17' 10"
18	André Cardoso (POR)	Cannondale–Garmin	+ 23' 31"
19	Giovanni Visconti (ITA)	Movistar Team	+ 36' 19"
20	Diego Rosa (ITA)	Astana	+ 43' 27"
21	Nelson Oliveira (POR)	Lampre–Merida	+ 44' 24"
22	Sergio Henao (COL)	Team Sky	+ 44' 30"
23	Haimar Zubeldia (ESP)	Trek Factory Racing	+ 45' 19"
24	Fränk Schleck (LUX)	Trek Factory Racing	+ 48' 48"
25	Mikel Landa (ESP)	Astana	+ 51' 30"
26	Nicolas Roche (IRL)	Team Sky	+ 53' 38"
27	Maxime Monfort (BEL)	Lotto–Soudal	+ 54' 37"
28	Maxime Bouet (FRA)	Etixx–Quick-Step	+ 1h 00' 14"
29	Carlos Verona (ESP)	Etixx–Quick-Step	+ 1h 02' 49"
30	Daniel Navarro (ESP)	Cofidis	+ 1h 06' 08"
31	Alberto Losada (ESP)	Team Katusha	+ 1h 06' 47"
32	Rodolfo Torres (COL)	Colombia	+ 1h 12' 17"
33	Luis León Sánchez (ESP)	Astana	+ 1h 15' 05"
34	José Gonçalves (POR)	Caja Rural–Seguros RGA	+ 1h 15' 39"
35	Paweł Poljański (POL)	Tinkoff–Saxo	+ 1h 16' 20"
36	Tiago Machado (POR)	Team Katusha	+ 1h 25' 37"
37	George Bennett (NZL)	LottoNL–Jumbo	+ 1h 26' 33"
38	Larry Warbasse (USA)	IAM Cycling	+ 1h 31' 24"
39	Eduard Vorganov (RUS)	Team Katusha	+ 1h 32' 57"
40	Andrey Amador (CRC)	Movistar Team	+ 1h 37' 46"
41	Matteo Montaguti (ITA)	AG2R La Mondiale	+ 1h 47' 20"
42	Lawson Craddock (USA)	Team Giant–Alpecin	+ 1h 48' 55"
43	José Joaquín Rojas (ESP)	Movistar Team	+ 1h 52' 12"
44	Ángel Madrazo (ESP)	Caja Rural–Seguros RGA	+ 1h 52' 44"
45	Rubén Plaza (ESP)	Lampre–Merida	+ 1h 53' 41"
46	Joe Dombrowski (USA)	Cannondale–Garmin	+ 1h 53' 47"
47	Sylvain Chavanel (FRA)	IAM Cycling	+ 1h 55' 16"
48	Ricardo Vilela (POR)	Caja Rural–Seguros RGA	+ 1h 55' 18"
49	Tosh Van der Sande (BEL)	Lotto–Soudal	+ 1h 57' 42"
50	Pierre Rolland (FRA)	Team Europcar	+ 1h 59' 10"
51	Mikaël Cherel (FRA)	AG2R La Mondiale	+ 1h 59' 28"
52	Jesper Hansen (DEN)	Tinkoff–Saxo	+ 2h 01' 46"
53	Alex Cano (COL)	Colombia	+ 2h 03' 58"
54	Riccardo Zoidl (AUT)	Trek Factory Racing	+ 2h 09' 40"
55	Adam Hansen (AUS)	Lotto–Soudal	+ 2h 11' 06"
56	Darwin Atapuma (COL)	BMC Racing Team	+ 2h 12' 42"
57	Dario Cataldo (ITA)	Astana	+ 2h 18' 30"
58	Cyril Gautier (FRA)	Team Europcar	+ 2h 18' 40"
59	Amaël Moinard (FRA)	BMC Racing Team	+ 2h 18' 51"
60	Leonardo Duque (COL)	Colombia	+ 2h 19' 38"
61	Cyril Lemoine (FRA)	Cofidis	+ 2h 21' 39"
62	Pieter Serry (BEL)	Etixx–Quick-Step	+ 2h 26' 30"
63	Kristijan Đurasek (CRO)	Lampre–Merida	+ 2h 29' 10"
64	Koen de Kort (NED)	Team Giant–Alpecin	+ 2h 29' 29"
65	Yukiya Arashiro (JPN)	Team Europcar	+ 2h 30' 07"
66	Jay McCarthy (AUS)	Tinkoff–Saxo	+ 2h 31' 13"
67	Fabio Duarte (COL)	Colombia	+ 2h 31' 14"
68	Andrey Zeits (KAZ)	Astana	+ 2h 32' 07"
69	Geraint Thomas (GBR)	Team Sky	+ 2h 32' 24"
70	Miguel Ángel Rubiano (COL)	Colombia	+ 2h 36' 54"
71	Ian Boswell (USA)	Team Sky	+ 2h 36' 59"
72	Moreno Moser (ITA)	Cannondale–Garmin	+ 2h 37' 11"
73	Jérôme Cousin (FRA)	Team Europcar	+ 2h 38' 40"
74	Julien Simon (FRA)	Cofidis	+ 2h 39' 01"
75	Ben King (USA)	Cannondale–Garmin	+ 2h 39' 09"
76	Pavel Kochetkov (RUS)	Team Katusha	+ 2h 39' 39"
77	Salvatore Puccio (ITA)	Team Sky	+ 2h 41' 05"
78	Alessandro De Marchi (ITA)	BMC Racing Team	+ 2h 41' 16"
79	Natnael Berhane (ERI)	MTN–Qhubeka	+ 2h 41' 24"
80	Javier Moreno (ESP)	Movistar Team	+ 2h 43' 31"
81	Francisco Ventoso (ESP)	Movistar Team	+ 2h 44' 45"
82	Jelle Vanendert (BEL)	Lotto–Soudal	+ 2h 45' 39"
83	Vasil Kiryienka (BLR)	Team Sky	+ 2h 49' 18"
84	Daryl Impey (RSA)	Orica–GreenEDGE	+ 2h 50' 57"
85	Rinaldo Nocentini (ITA)	AG2R La Mondiale	+ 2h 51' 47"
86	Vicente Reynès (ESP)	IAM Cycling	+ 2h 53' 34"
87	Juan Pablo Valencia (COL)	Colombia	+ 2h 56' 07"
88	Omar Fraile (ESP)	Caja Rural–Seguros RGA	+ 2h 57' 47"
89	Markel Irizar (ESP)	Trek Factory Racing	+ 2h 59' 18"
90	John Degenkolb (GER)	Team Giant–Alpecin	+ 2h 59' 49"
91	Christian Knees (GER)	Team Sky	+ 3h 00' 10"
92	Carlos Quintero (COL)	Colombia	+ 3h 02' 35"
93	Jens Keukeleire (BEL)	Orica–GreenEDGE	+ 3h 03' 40"
94	Davide Villella (ITA)	Cannondale–Garmin	+ 3h 04' 39"
95	Timo Roosen (NED)	LottoNL–Jumbo	+ 3h 08' 44"
96	Sébastien Minard (FRA)	AG2R La Mondiale	+ 3h 09' 11"
97	Pello Bilbao (ESP)	Caja Rural–Seguros RGA	+ 3h 09' 51"
98	Yoann Bagot (FRA)	Cofidis	+ 3h 12' 17"
99	Bert-Jan Lindeman (NED)	LottoNL–Jumbo	+ 3h 13' 18"
100	Imanol Erviti (ESP)	Movistar Team	+ 3h 13' 43"
101	Pavel Brutt (RUS)	Tinkoff–Saxo	+ 3h 14' 23"
102	Steve Cummings (GBR)	MTN–Qhubeka	+ 3h 17' 32"
103	Ángel Vicioso (ESP)	Team Katusha	+ 3h 18' 33"
104	Mike Teunissen (NED)	LottoNL–Jumbo	+ 3h 19' 28"
105	Kristian Sbaragli (ITA)	MTN–Qhubeka	+ 3h 19' 55"
106	Marcel Aregger (SUI)	IAM Cycling	+ 3h 23' 32"
107	Nikolas Maes (BEL)	Etixx–Quick-Step	+ 3h 25' 03"
108	Luka Mezgec (SLO)	Team Giant–Alpecin	+ 3h 27' 22"
109	Mickaël Delage (FRA)	FDJ	+ 3h 28' 04"
110	Tom Van Asbroeck (BEL)	LottoNL–Jumbo	+ 3h 28' 33"
111	Laurent Pichon (FRA)	FDJ	+ 3h 30' 07"
112	Alexis Gougeard (FRA)	AG2R La Mondiale	+ 3h 30' 45"
113	Kévin Reza (FRA)	FDJ	+ 3h 31' 50"
114	Simon Gerrans (AUS)	Orica–GreenEDGE	+ 3h 31' 54"
115	Dennis van Winden (NED)	LottoNL–Jumbo	+ 3h 33' 46"
116	Dominique Rollin (CAN)	Cofidis	+ 3h 35' 35"
117	Martin Velits (SVK)	Etixx–Quick-Step	+ 3h 37' 35"
118	Jempy Drucker (LUX)	BMC Racing Team	+ 3h 37' 37"
119	Simon Pellaud (SUI)	IAM Cycling	+ 3h 38' 39"
120	Olivier Le Gac (FRA)	FDJ	+ 3h 38' 53"
121	Johan Vansummeren (BEL)	AG2R La Mondiale	+ 3h 39' 07"
122	Jaco Venter (RSA)	MTN–Qhubeka	+ 3h 41' 39"
123	Jay Thomson (RSA)	MTN–Qhubeka	+ 3h 43' 05"
124	Joey Rosskopf (USA)	BMC Racing Team	+ 3h 43' 08"
125	Tsgabu Grmay (ETH)	Lampre–Merida	+ 3h 43' 26"
126	Jasper De Buyst (BEL)	Lotto–Soudal	+ 3h 44' 12"
127	Brayan Ramírez (COL)	Colombia	+ 3h 44' 21"
128	Johann Van Zyl (RSA)	MTN–Qhubeka	+ 3h 44' 36"
129	Alex Howes (USA)	Cannondale–Garmin	+ 3h 44' 42"
130	Mathew Hayman (AUS)	Orica–GreenEDGE	+ 3h 45' 38"
131	Daniele Bennati (ITA)	Tinkoff–Saxo	+ 3h 48' 58"
132	Yaroslav Popovych (UKR)	Trek Factory Racing	+ 3h 49' 11"
133	Jimmy Engoulvent (FRA)	Team Europcar	+ 3h 51' 04"
134	Youcef Reguigui (ALG)	MTN–Qhubeka	+ 3h 51' 24"
135	Alessandro Vanotti (ITA)	Astana	+ 3h 53' 40"
136	Walter Pedraza (COL)	Colombia	+ 3h 55' 04"
137	Songezo Jim (RSA)	MTN–Qhubeka	+ 3h 56' 25"
138	Antoine Duchesne (CAN)	Team Europcar	+ 3h 57' 37"
139	Rory Sutherland (AUS)	Movistar Team	+ 3h 59' 04"
140	Maciej Bodnar (POL)	Tinkoff–Saxo	+ 3h 59' 47"
141	Danny van Poppel (NED)	Trek Factory Racing	+ 3h 59' 51"
142	Thierry Hupond (FRA)	Team Giant–Alpecin	+ 3h 59' 53"
143	Johannes Fröhlinger (GER)	Team Giant–Alpecin	+ 4h 00' 25"
144	Ilia Koshevoy (BLR)	Lampre–Merida	+ 4h 00' 30"
145	Tony Hurel (FRA)	Team Europcar	+ 4h 00' 53"
146	Gatis Smukulis (LAT)	Team Katusha	+ 4h 01' 51"
147	Damien Howson (AUS)	Orica–GreenEDGE	+ 4h 05' 19"
148	Iljo Keisse (BEL)	Etixx–Quick-Step	+ 4h 07' 06"
149	Carlos Barbero (ESP)	Caja Rural–Seguros RGA	+ 4h 07' 22"
150	Blel Kadri (FRA)	AG2R La Mondiale	+ 4h 10' 04"
151	Valerio Conti (ITA)	Lampre–Merida	+ 4h 11' 24"
152	Maximiliano Richeze (ARG)	Lampre–Merida	+ 4h 13' 33"
153	Martijn Keizer (NED)	LottoNL–Jumbo	+ 4h 14' 01"
154	Gediminas Bagdonas (LTU)	AG2R La Mondiale	+ 4h 16' 22"
155	Tom Stamsnijder (NED)	Team Giant–Alpecin	+ 4h 17' 57"
156	Murilo Fischer (BRA)	FDJ	+ 4h 21' 19"
157	Zico Waeytens (BEL)	Team Giant–Alpecin	+ 4h 37' 10"
158	Boy van Poppel (NED)	Trek Factory Racing	+ 4h 57' 31"

=== Points classification ===
Final points classification (1–10)
Rank	Rider	Team	Points
1	Alejandro Valverde (ESP)	Movistar Team	118
2	Joaquim Rodríguez (ESP)	Team Katusha	116
3	Esteban Chaves (COL)	Orica–GreenEDGE	108
4	Tom Dumoulin (NED)	Team Giant–Alpecin	105
5	Nicolas Roche (IRL)	Team Sky	97
6	Fabio Aru (ITA)	Astana	97
7	John Degenkolb (GER)	Team Giant–Alpecin	93
8	Rafał Majka (POL)	Tinkoff–Saxo	89
9	Nairo Quintana (COL)	Movistar Team	84
10	José Joaquín Rojas (ESP)	Movistar Team	76

=== Mountains classification ===
Final mountains classification (1–10)
Rank	Rider	Team	Points
1	Omar Fraile (ESP)	Caja Rural–Seguros RGA	82
2	Rubén Plaza (ESP)	Lampre–Merida	63
3	Fränk Schleck (LUX)	Trek Factory Racing	30
4	Alessandro de Marchi (ITA)	BMC Racing Team	28
5	Mikel Landa (ESP)	Astana	28
6	José Gonçalves (POR)	Caja Rural–Seguros RGA	24
7	Rodolfo Torres (COL)	Colombia	22
8	Pierre Rolland (FRA)	Team Europcar	20
9	José Joaquín Rojas (ESP)	Movistar Team	19
10	Mikaël Cherel (FRA)	AG2R La Mondiale	18

=== Combination classification ===
Final combination classification (1–10)
Rank	Rider	Team	Points
1	Joaquim Rodríguez (ESP)	Team Katusha	16
2	Fabio Aru (ITA)	Astana	23
3	Tom Dumoulin (NED)	Team Giant–Alpecin	24
4	Rafał Majka (POL)	Tinkoff–Saxo	38
5	Esteban Chaves (COL)	Orica–GreenEDGE	43
6	Nicolas Roche (IRL)	Team Sky	46
7	Mikel Landa (ESP)	Astana	49
8	José Gonçalves (POR)	Caja Rural–Seguros RGA	52
9	Nelson Oliveira (POR)	Lampre–Merida	57
10	Fränk Schleck (LUX)	Trek Factory Racing	59

=== Team classification ===
Final teams classification (1–10)
Rank	Team	Points
1	(Spain) Movistar Team	256h 44' 38"
2	(United Kingdom) Team Sky	+ 29' 47"
3	(Russia) Team Katusha	+ 35' 44"
4	(Kazakhstan) Astana	+ 48' 24"
5	(France) Team Europcar	+ 1h 11' 00"
6	(Spain) Caja Rural–Seguros RGA	+ 1h 20' 44"
7	(Russia) Tinkoff–Saxo	+ 1h 40' 58"
8	(Belgium) Etixx–Quick-Step	+ 1h 43' 44"
9	(Belgium) Lotto–Soudal	+ 1h 55' 17"
10	(France) Cofidis	+ 2h 36' 11"

== See also ==
- 2015 in men's road cycling
- 2015 in sports

== Sources ==
- Race regulations (PDF). Vuelta a España. Unipublic. Archived (PDF) from the original on 18 August 2015.
