= Jay McCarthy =

Australian cyclist (born 1992)

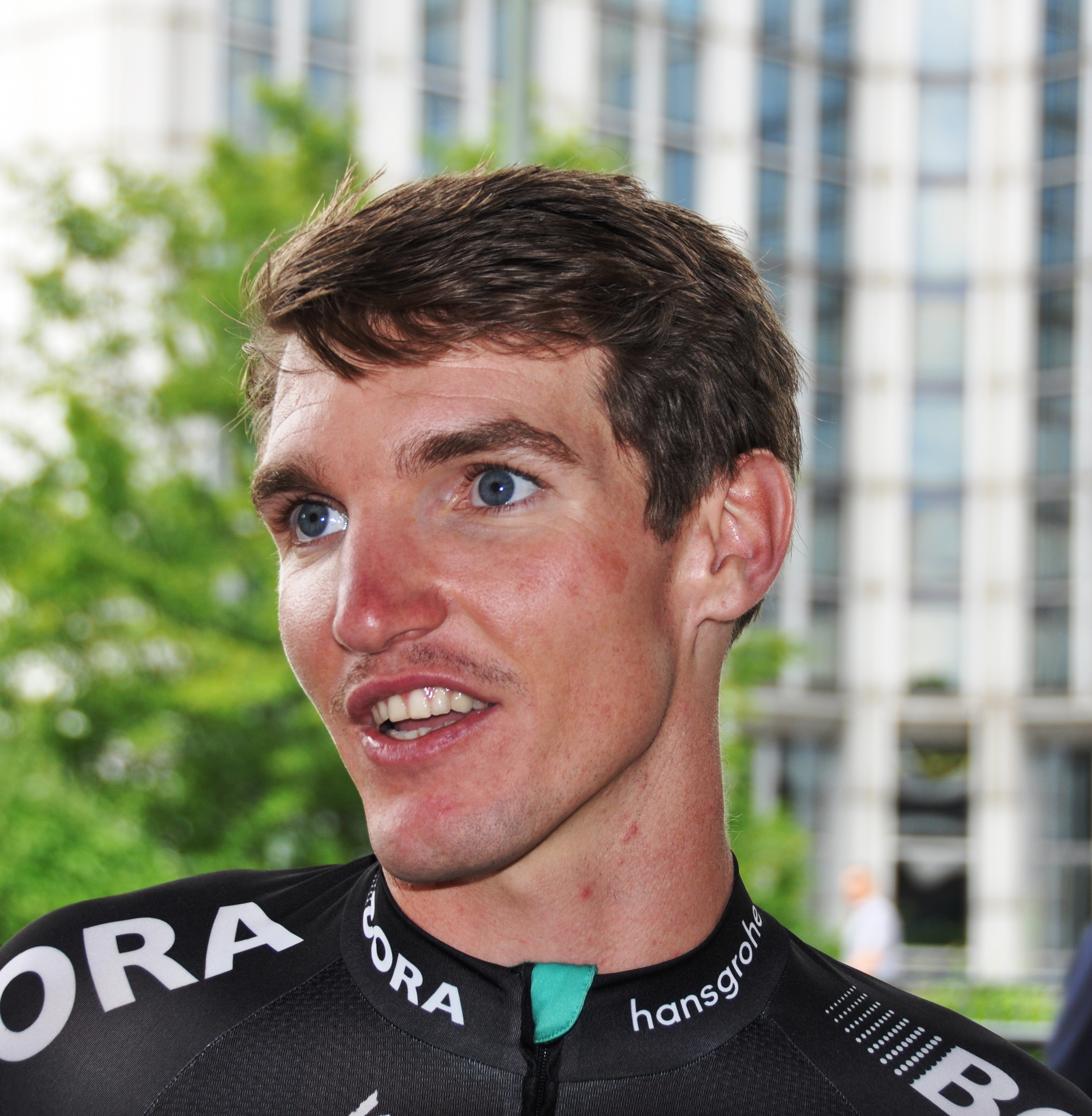
- McCarthy in 2017

Personal information
- Full name: Jay McCarthy
- Born: 8 September 1992 (age 34) Maryborough, Queensland, Australia
- Height: 1.74 m (5 ft 9 in)
- Weight: 63 kg (139 lb)

Cycling career
- Sport: Cycling
- Discipline: Road
- Role: Rider
- Rider type: Puncheur

Professional teams
- 2011–2012: Team Jayco–AIS
- 2013–2016: Saxo–Tinkoff
- 2017–2020: Bora–Hansgrohe

Major wins
- One-day races and Classics Great Ocean Road Race (2018)

Jay McCarthy (born 8 September 1992) is an Australian racing cyclist, who most recently rode for UCI WorldTeam Bora–Hansgrohe.

== Career ==
He finished in 91st place in the 2014 Giro d'Italia. In 2015, McCarthy showed promise by reaping a third place in the overall classification of the Tour of Turkey thanks to good placings in the mountains. He was named in the start list for the 2015 Vuelta a España and the 2016 Giro d'Italia. In October 2016 he was announced as a member of the Bora–Hansgrohe squad for 2017, with a focus on short stage races and punchy one day classics. In June 2017, he was named in the startlist for the 2017 Tour de France.

== Major results ==
2009
7th Road race, UCI Juniors World Championships
2010
National Junior Road Championships

1st Road race
2nd Time trial

UCI Juniors Road World Championships

2nd Road race
5th Time trial

2nd Overall GP Général Patton
2011
3rd Time trial, National Under-23 Road Championships
4th Overall Thüringen Rundfahrt der U23

1st Stages 1 & 2 (TTT)

2012
1st Overall Tour of Wellington

1st Young rider classification
1st Stage 2

1st Trofeo Banca Popolare di Vicenza
1st Stage 6 Tour de Bretagne
1st Prologue Tour de l'Avenir
2nd GP Capodarco
4th Overall Toscana-Terra di Ciclismo

1st Points classification
1st Young rider classification
1st Stage 4

4th Trofeo Alcide Degasperi
4th Trofeo Internazionale Bastianelli
5th Gran Premio di Poggiana
2015
3rd Overall Tour of Turkey
2016
1st Stage 5 (TTT) Tour of Croatia
4th Overall Tour Down Under

1st Young rider classification
1st Stage 2

5th Road race, National Road Championships
2017
3rd Overall Tour Down Under
9th Cadel Evans Great Ocean Road Race
2018
1st Cadel Evans Great Ocean Road Race
1st Stage 3 Tour of the Basque Country
2nd Road race, National Road Championships
8th Grand Prix Pino Cerami
2019
8th Cadel Evans Great Ocean Road Race
2020
5th Road race, National Road Championships
6th Cadel Evans Great Ocean Road Race

=== Grand Tour general classification results timeline ===
Grand Tour	2014	2015	2016	2017	2018	2019	2020
Giro d'Italia	91	—	88	—	—	62	—
Tour de France	—	—	—	94	—	—	—
Vuelta a España	—	66	—	—	91	—	DNF

Legend
—	Did not compete
DNF	Did not finish
