= List of teams and cyclists in the 2015 Vuelta a España =

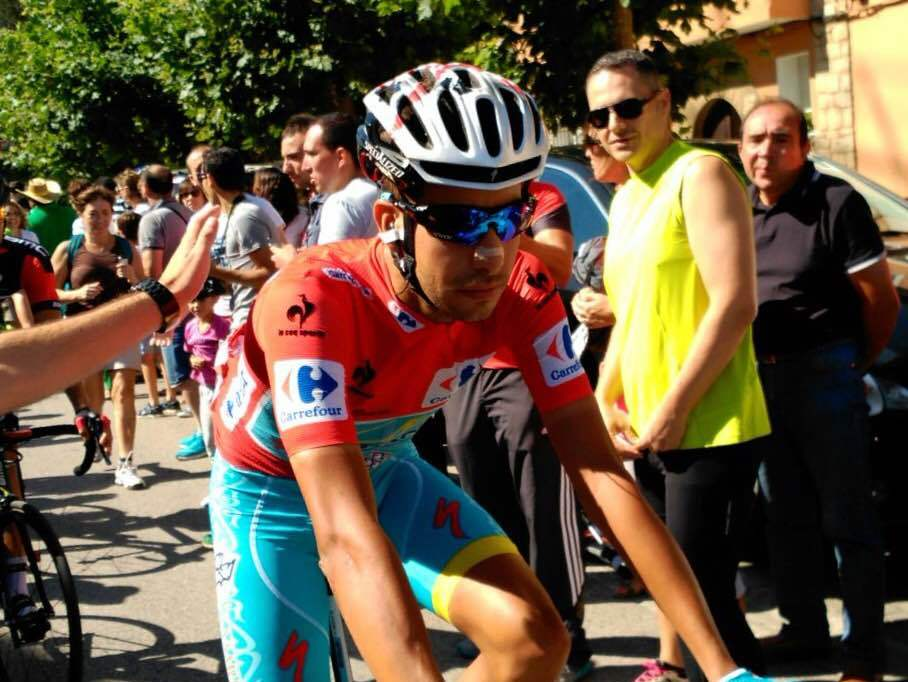
Fabio Aru, winner of the 2015 Vuelta a España, wearing the leader's red jersey during stage 15

The number of riders per nation participated in the 2015 Vuelta a España: 20+ / 10–19 / 2–9 / 1

The 2015 Vuelta a España was the 70th edition of the race. It was the last of cycling's three Grand Tours to take place during the 2015 road cycling season. The race started in Marbella on 22 August and finished in Madrid on 13 September; three days were in Andorra, including the whole of stage 11 and the first of the race's two rest days.

All 17 UCI World Tour teams were automatically entitled to start the race. In March 2015, five UCI Professional Continental teams were awarded wildcard places in the race by the organisers, Unipublic. As each team was entitled to enter nine riders, the peloton at the beginning of the first stage consisted of 198 riders. The riders came from 37 countries; France, Spain and Italy all had 20 or more riders in the race. The startlist included all of the top four riders from the 2015 Tour de France: Chris Froome (Team Sky), Nairo Quintana and Alejandro Valverde (both Movistar Team), and Vincenzo Nibali (Astana). The riders had an average age of 29.13 years: the oldest rider to start the race was 38-year-old Haimar Zubeldia (Trek Factory Racing) and the youngest was 20-year-old Matej Mohorič (Cannondale–Garmin).

At the end of the final stage, there were 158 riders left in the race, with 40 riders failing to finish. Froome and Nibali were both among the riders who left the race before it reached Madrid: Froome abandoned the race after breaking his foot on stage 11; Nibali was disqualified after receiving illegal assistance from his team car during stage 2. The race was won by Fabio Aru (Astana). He first took the red jersey (indicating the lead of the general classification) following the mountainous stage 11. He lost it first to Joaquim Rodríguez (Team Katusha) on the uphill finish of stage 16, then to Tom Dumoulin (Team Giant–Alpecin) in the individual time trial on stage 17. Aru was six seconds behind Dumoulin going into the penultimate stage of the race; an attack on the final climb of the Vuelta dropped Dumoulin and Aru was able to take the overall victory in the race. Rodríguez finished second, 57 seconds behind Aru, with Rafał Majka (Tinkoff–Saxo) a further 12 seconds behind in third. Valverde won the points classification and Rodríguez the combination classification. The mountains classification was won by Omar Fraile (Caja Rural–Seguros RGA). Movistar won the team classification.

== Teams ==
The 17 UCI WorldTeams were automatically invited to participate in the Vuelta. In addition, the race organisers, Unipublic, invited five wildcard teams. These included Caja Rural–Seguros RGA, the only Spanish-registered UCI Professional Continental team. Two French teams, Cofidis and Team Europcar, also received entries. MTN–Qhubeka were invited for the second consecutive year after also securing their first ever entry into the Tour de France. The final team to be invited was Colombia. One prominent team that was not invited was UnitedHealthcare.

UCI WorldTeams

- Astana (riders)
- AG2R La Mondiale (riders)
- FDJ (riders)
- Team Sky (riders)
- Tinkoff–Saxo (riders)
- Movistar Team (riders)
- BMC Racing Team (riders)
- Lotto–Soudal (riders)
- Team Giant–Alpecin (riders)
- Team Katusha (riders)
- Orica–GreenEDGE (riders)
- Etixx–Quick-Step (riders)
- LottoNL–Jumbo (riders)
- Trek Factory Racing (riders)
- Lampre–Merida (riders)
- Cannondale–Garmin (riders)
- IAM Cycling (riders)

UCI Professional Continental teams

- Team Europcar (riders)
- Cofidis (riders)
- Caja Rural–Seguros RGA (riders)
- Colombia (riders)
- MTN–Qhubeka (riders)

== Cyclists ==
Legend
No.	Starting number worn by the rider during the Vuelta
Pos.	Position in the general classification
Time	Deficit to the winner of the general classification
General classification	Denotes the winner of the general classification
Points classification	Denotes the winner of the points classification
Mountains classification	Denotes the winner of the mountains classification
Combination classification	Denotes the winner of the combination classification
DNS	Denotes a rider who did not start, followed by the stage before which he withdrew
DNF	Denotes a rider who did not finish, followed by the stage in which he withdrew
DSQ	Denotes a rider who was disqualified from the race, followed by the stage in which this occurred
Age correct as of 22 August 2015, the date on which the Vuelta began

=== By starting number ===
No.	Name	Nationality	Team	Age	Pos.	Time	Ref
1	Chris Froome	Great Britain	Team Sky	30	DNS-12	—	
2	Ian Boswell	United States	Team Sky	24	71	+ 2h 36' 59"	
3	Sergio Henao	Colombia	Team Sky	27	22	+ 44' 30"	
4	Vasil Kiryienka	Belarus	Team Sky	34	83	+ 2h 49' 18"	
5	Christian Knees	Germany	Team Sky	34	91	+ 3h 00' 10"	
6	Mikel Nieve	Spain	Team Sky	31	8	+ 7' 06"	
7	Salvatore Puccio	Italy	Team Sky	25	77	+ 2h 41' 05"	
8	Nicolas Roche	Ireland	Team Sky	31	26	+ 53' 38"	
9	Geraint Thomas	Great Britain	Team Sky	29	69	+ 2h 32' 24"	
11	Domenico Pozzovivo	Italy	AG2R La Mondiale	32	11	+ 11' 10"	
12	Gediminas Bagdonas	Lithuania	AG2R La Mondiale	29	154	+ 4h 16' 22"	
13	Mikaël Cherel	France	AG2R La Mondiale	29	51	+ 1h 59' 28"	
14	Alexis Gougeard	France	AG2R La Mondiale	22	112	+ 3h 30' 45"	
15	Blel Kadri	France	AG2R La Mondiale	28	150	+ 4h 10' 04"	
16	Sébastien Minard	France	AG2R La Mondiale	33	96	+ 3h 09' 11"	
17	Matteo Montaguti	Italy	AG2R La Mondiale	31	41	+ 1h 47' 20"	
18	Rinaldo Nocentini	Italy	AG2R La Mondiale	37	85	+ 2h 51' 47"	
19	Johan Vansummeren	Belgium	AG2R La Mondiale	34	121	+ 3h 39' 07"	
21	Fabio Aru	Italy	Astana	25	1	85h 36' 13"	
22	Dario Cataldo	Italy	Astana	30	57	+ 2h 18' 30"	
23	Mikel Landa	Spain	Astana	25	25	+ 51' 30"	
24	Vincenzo Nibali	Italy	Astana	30	DSQ-2	—	
25	Diego Rosa	Italy	Astana	26	20	+ 43' 27"	
26	Luis León Sánchez	Spain	Astana	31	33	+ 1h 15' 05"	
27	Paolo Tiralongo	Italy	Astana	38	DNF-3	—	
28	Alessandro Vanotti	Italy	Astana	34	135	+ 3h 53' 40"	
29	Andrey Zeits	Kazakhstan	Astana	28	68	+ 2h 32' 07"	
31	Samuel Sánchez	Spain	BMC Racing Team	37	DNF-14	—	
32	Darwin Atapuma	Colombia	BMC Racing Team	27	56	+ 2h 12' 42"	
33	Marcus Burghardt	Germany	BMC Racing Team	32	DNS-3	—	
34	Alessandro De Marchi	Italy	BMC Racing Team	29	78	+ 2h 41' 16"	
35	Jempy Drucker	Luxembourg	BMC Racing Team	28	118	+ 3h 37' 37"	
36	Amaël Moinard	France	BMC Racing Team	33	59	+ 2h 18' 51"	
37	Joey Rosskopf	United States	BMC Racing Team	25	124	+ 3h 43' 08"	
38	Tejay van Garderen	United States	BMC Racing Team	27	DNF-8	—	
39	Peter Velits	Slovakia	BMC Racing Team	30	DNS-18	—	
41	David Arroyo	Spain	Caja Rural–Seguros RGA	35	12	+ 13' 29"	
42	Carlos Barbero	Spain	Caja Rural–Seguros RGA	24	149	+ 4h 07' 22"	
43	Pello Bilbao	Spain	Caja Rural–Seguros RGA	25	97	+ 3h 09' 51"	
44	Omar Fraile	Spain	Caja Rural–Seguros RGA	25	88	+ 2h 57' 47"	
45	José Gonçalves	Portugal	Caja Rural–Seguros RGA	26	34	+ 1h 15' 39"	
46	Ángel Madrazo	Spain	Caja Rural–Seguros RGA	27	44	+ 1h 52' 44"	
47	Lluís Mas	Spain	Caja Rural–Seguros RGA	26	DNF-14	—	
48	Amets Txurruka	Spain	Caja Rural–Seguros RGA	32	DNF-11	—	
49	Ricardo Vilela	Portugal	Caja Rural–Seguros RGA	27	48	+ 1h 55' 18"	
51	Nacer Bouhanni	France	Cofidis	25	DNF-8	—	
52	Yoann Bagot	France	Cofidis	27	98	+ 3h 12' 17"	
53	Romain Hardy	France	Cofidis	26	DNF-11	—	
54	Cyril Lemoine	France	Cofidis	32	61	+ 2h 21' 39"	
55	Daniel Navarro	Spain	Cofidis	32	30	+ 1h 06' 08"	
56	Dominique Rollin	Canada	Cofidis	32	116	+ 3h 35' 35"	
57	Stéphane Rossetto	France	Cofidis	28	DNF-19	—	
58	Julien Simon	France	Cofidis	29	74	+ 2h 39' 01"	
59	Geoffrey Soupe	France	Cofidis	27	DNS-14	—	
61	Alex Cano	Colombia	Colombia	32	53	+ 2h 03' 58"	
62	Fabio Duarte	Colombia	Colombia	29	67	+ 2h 31' 14"	
63	Leonardo Duque	Colombia	Colombia	35	60	+ 2h 19' 38"	
64	Walter Pedraza	Colombia	Colombia	33	136	+ 3h 55' 04"	
65	Carlos Quintero	Colombia	Colombia	29	92	+ 3h 02' 35"	
66	Brayan Ramírez	Colombia	Colombia	22	127	+ 3h 44' 21"	
67	Miguel Ángel Rubiano	Colombia	Colombia	30	70	+ 2h 36' 54"	
68	Rodolfo Torres	Colombia	Colombia	28	32	+ 1h 12' 17"	
69	Juan Pablo Valencia	Colombia	Colombia	27	87	+ 2h 56' 07"	
71	Niki Terpstra	Netherlands	Etixx–Quick-Step	31	DNS-18	—	
72	Maxime Bouet	France	Etixx–Quick-Step	28	28	+ 1h 00' 14"	
73	Gianluca Brambilla	Italy	Etixx–Quick-Step	28	13	+ 15' 26"	
74	David de la Cruz	Spain	Etixx–Quick-Step	26	DNS-6	—	
75	Iljo Keisse	Belgium	Etixx–Quick-Step	32	148	+ 4h 07' 06"	
76	Nikolas Maes	Belgium	Etixx–Quick-Step	29	107	+ 3h 25' 03"	
77	Pieter Serry	Belgium	Etixx–Quick-Step	26	62	+ 2h 26' 30"	
78	Martin Velits	Slovakia	Etixx–Quick-Step	30	117	+ 3h 37' 35"	
79	Carlos Verona	Spain	Etixx–Quick-Step	22	29	+ 1h 02' 49"	
81	Kenny Elissonde	France	FDJ	24	16	+ 17' 07"	
82	Arnaud Courteille	France	FDJ	26	DNF-19	—	
83	Mickaël Delage	France	FDJ	30	109	+ 3h 28' 04"	
84	Murilo Fischer	Brazil	FDJ	36	156	+ 4h 21' 19"	
85	Olivier Le Gac	France	FDJ	21	120	+ 3h 38' 53"	
86	Lorrenzo Manzin	France	FDJ	21	DNF-10	—	
87	Laurent Pichon	France	FDJ	29	111	+ 3h 30' 07"	
88	Kévin Reza	France	FDJ	27	113	+ 3h 31' 50"	
89	Jussi Veikkanen	Finland	FDJ	34	DNF-11	—	
91	Sylvain Chavanel	France	IAM Cycling	36	47	+ 1h 55' 16"	
92	Marcel Aregger	Switzerland	IAM Cycling	24	106	+ 3h 23' 32"	
93	Jérôme Coppel	France	IAM Cycling	29	DNS-20	—	
94	Thomas Degand	Belgium	IAM Cycling	29	DNF-9	—	
95	Simon Pellaud	Switzerland	IAM Cycling	22	119	+ 3h 38' 39"	
96	Matteo Pelucchi	Italy	IAM Cycling	26	DNF-2	—	
97	Vicente Reynés	Spain	IAM Cycling	34	86	+ 2h 53' 34"	
98	David Tanner	Australia	IAM Cycling	30	DNF-2	—	
99	Larry Warbasse	United States	IAM Cycling	25	38	+ 1h 31' 24"	
101	Rubén Plaza	Spain	Lampre–Merida	35	45	+ 1h 53' 41"	
102	Mattia Cattaneo	Italy	Lampre–Merida	24	DNF-13	—	
103	Valerio Conti	Italy	Lampre–Merida	22	151	+ 4h 11' 24"	
104	Kristijan Đurasek	Croatia	Lampre–Merida	28	63	+ 2h 29' 10"	
105	Tsgabu Grmay	Ethiopia	Lampre–Merida	23	125	+ 3h 43' 26"	
106	Przemysław Niemiec	Poland	Lampre–Merida	35	DNF-2	—	
107	Nelson Oliveira	Portugal	Lampre–Merida	26	21	+ 44' 24"	
108	Maximiliano Richeze	Argentina	Lampre–Merida	32	152	+ 4h 13' 33"	
109	Ilia Koshevoy	Belarus	Lampre–Merida	24	144	+ 4h 00' 30"	
111	Kris Boeckmans	Belgium	Lotto–Soudal	28	DNF-8	—	
112	Jasper De Buyst	Belgium	Lotto–Soudal	21	126	+ 3h 44' 12"	
113	Bart De Clercq	Belgium	Lotto–Soudal	28	14	+ 16' 34"	
114	Thomas De Gendt	Belgium	Lotto–Soudal	28	DNF-14	—	
115	Adam Hansen	Australia	Lotto–Soudal	34	55	+ 2h 11' 06"	
116	Maxime Monfort	Belgium	Lotto–Soudal	32	27	+ 54' 37"	
117	Jurgen Van den Broeck	Belgium	Lotto–Soudal	32	DNS-18	—	
118	Tosh Van der Sande	Belgium	Lotto–Soudal	24	49	+ 1h 57' 42"	
119	Jelle Vanendert	Belgium	Lotto–Soudal	30	82	+ 2h 45' 39"	
121	Alejandro Valverde	Spain	Movistar Team	35	7	+ 6' 47"	
122	Andrey Amador	Costa Rica	Movistar Team	28	40	+ 1h 37' 46"	
123	Imanol Erviti	Spain	Movistar Team	31	100	+ 3h 13' 43"	
124	Javier Moreno	Spain	Movistar Team	31	80	+ 2h 43' 31"	
125	Nairo Quintana	Colombia	Movistar Team	25	4	+ 1' 42"	
126	José Joaquín Rojas	Spain	Movistar Team	30	43	+ 1h 52' 12"	
127	Rory Sutherland	Australia	Movistar Team	33	139	+ 3h 59' 04"	
128	Francisco Ventoso	Spain	Movistar Team	33	81	+ 2h 44' 45"	
129	Giovanni Visconti	Italy	Movistar Team	32	19	+ 36' 19"	
131	Natnael Berhane	Eritrea	MTN–Qhubeka	24	79	+ 2h 41' 24"	
132	Steve Cummings	Great Britain	MTN–Qhubeka	34	102	+ 3h 17' 32"	
133	Louis Meintjes	South Africa	MTN–Qhubeka	23	10	+ 10' 26"	
134	Youcef Reguigui	Algeria	MTN–Qhubeka	25	134	+ 3h 51' 24"	
135	Kristian Sbaragli	Italy	MTN–Qhubeka	25	105	+ 3h 19' 55"	
136	Songezo Jim	South Africa	MTN–Qhubeka	24	137	+ 3h 56' 25"	
137	Jay Thomson	South Africa	MTN–Qhubeka	29	123	+ 3h 43' 05"	
138	Johann van Zyl	South Africa	MTN–Qhubeka	24	128	+ 3h 44' 36"	
139	Jaco Venter	South Africa	MTN–Qhubeka	28	122	+ 3h 41' 39"	
141	Esteban Chaves	Colombia	Orica–GreenEDGE	25	5	+ 3' 10"	
142	Mitchell Docker	Australia	Orica–GreenEDGE	28	DNF-13	—	
143	Caleb Ewan	Australia	Orica–GreenEDGE	21	DNF-10	—	
144	Simon Gerrans	Australia	Orica–GreenEDGE	35	114	+ 3h 31' 54"	
145	Mathew Hayman	Australia	Orica–GreenEDGE	37	130	+ 3h 45' 38"	
146	Damien Howson	Australia	Orica–GreenEDGE	23	147	+ 4h 05' 19"	
147	Daryl Impey	South Africa	Orica–GreenEDGE	30	84	+ 2h 50' 57"	
148	Jens Keukeleire	Belgium	Orica–GreenEDGE	26	93	+ 3h 03' 40"	
149	Cameron Meyer	Australia	Orica–GreenEDGE	27	DNS-18	—	
151	Andrew Talansky	United States	Cannondale–Garmin	26	DNS-18	—	
152	André Cardoso	Portugal	Cannondale–Garmin	30	18	+ 23' 31"	
153	Joe Dombrowski	United States	Cannondale–Garmin	24	46	+ 1h 53' 47"	
154	Alex Howes	United States	Cannondale–Garmin	27	129	+ 3h 44' 42"	
155	Ben King	United States	Cannondale–Garmin	26	75	+ 2h 39' 09"	
156	Dan Martin	Ireland	Cannondale–Garmin	29	DNF-8	—	
157	Matej Mohorič	Slovenia	Cannondale–Garmin	20	DNF-6	—	
158	Moreno Moser	Italy	Cannondale–Garmin	24	72	+ 2h 37' 11"	
159	Davide Villella	Italy	Cannondale–Garmin	24	94	+ 3h 04' 39"	
161	Pierre Rolland	France	Team Europcar	28	50	+ 1h 59' 10"	
162	Yukiya Arashiro	Japan	Team Europcar	30	65	+ 2h 30' 07"	
163	Jérôme Cousin	France	Team Europcar	26	73	+ 2h 38' 40"	
164	Antoine Duchesne	Canada	Team Europcar	23	138	+ 3h 57' 37"	
165	Jimmy Engoulvent	France	Team Europcar	35	133	+ 3h 51' 04"	
166	Cyril Gautier	France	Team Europcar	27	58	+ 2h 18' 40"	
167	Tony Hurel	France	Team Europcar	27	145	+ 4h 00' 53"	
168	Fabrice Jeandesboz	France	Team Europcar	30	17	+ 17' 10"	
169	Romain Sicard	France	Team Europcar	27	15	+ 16' 46"	
171	John Degenkolb	Germany	Team Giant–Alpecin	26	90	+ 2h 59' 49"	
172	Lawson Craddock	United States	Team Giant–Alpecin	23	42	+ 1h 48' 55"	
173	Koen de Kort	Netherlands	Team Giant–Alpecin	32	64	+ 2h 29' 29"	
174	Tom Dumoulin	Netherlands	Team Giant–Alpecin	24	6	+ 3' 46"	
175	Johannes Fröhlinger	Germany	Team Giant–Alpecin	30	143	+ 4h 00' 25"	
176	Thierry Hupond	France	Team Giant–Alpecin	30	142	+ 3h 59' 53"	
177	Luka Mezgec	Slovenia	Team Giant–Alpecin	27	108	+ 3h 27' 22"	
178	Tom Stamsnijder	Netherlands	Team Giant–Alpecin	30	155	+ 4h 17' 57"	
179	Zico Waeytens	Belgium	Team Giant–Alpecin	23	157	+ 4h 37' 10"	
181	Joaquim Rodríguez	Spain	Team Katusha	36	2	+ 57"	
182	Vladimir Isaichev	Russia	Team Katusha	29	DNS-11	—	
183	Pavel Kochetkov	Russia	Team Katusha	29	76	+ 2h 39' 39"	
184	Alberto Losada	Spain	Team Katusha	33	31	+ 1h 06' 47"	
185	Tiago Machado	Portugal	Team Katusha	29	36	+ 1h 25' 37"	
186	Daniel Moreno	Spain	Team Katusha	33	9	+ 7' 12"	
187	Gatis Smukulis	Latvia	Team Katusha	28	146	+ 4h 01' 51"	
188	Ángel Vicioso	Spain	Team Katusha	38	103	+ 3h 18' 33"	
189	Eduard Vorganov	Russia	Team Katusha	32	39	+ 1h 32' 57"	
191	George Bennett	New Zealand	LottoNL–Jumbo	25	37	+ 1h 26' 33"	
192	Martijn Keizer	Netherlands	LottoNL–Jumbo	27	153	+ 4h 14' 01"	
193	Bert-Jan Lindeman	Netherlands	LottoNL–Jumbo	26	99	+ 3h 13' 18"	
194	Timo Roosen	Netherlands	LottoNL–Jumbo	22	95	+ 3h 08' 44"	
195	Mike Teunissen	Netherlands	LottoNL–Jumbo	22	104	+ 3h 19' 28"	
196	Maarten Tjallingii	Netherlands	LottoNL–Jumbo	37	DNS-19	—	
197	Tom Van Asbroeck	Belgium	LottoNL–Jumbo	25	110	+ 3h 28' 33"	
198	Dennis van Winden	Netherlands	LottoNL–Jumbo	27	115	+ 3h 33' 46"	
199	Maarten Wynants	Belgium	LottoNL–Jumbo	33	DNS-13	—	
201	Rafał Majka	Poland	Tinkoff–Saxo	25	3	+ 1' 09"	
202	Daniele Bennati	Italy	Tinkoff–Saxo	34	131	+ 3h 48' 58"	
203	Maciej Bodnar	Poland	Tinkoff–Saxo	30	140	+ 3h 59' 47"	
204	Pavel Brutt	Russia	Tinkoff–Saxo	33	101	+ 3h 14' 23"	
205	Jesper Hansen	Denmark	Tinkoff–Saxo	24	52	+ 2h 01' 46"	
206	Jay McCarthy	Australia	Tinkoff–Saxo	22	66	+ 2h 31' 13"	
207	Sérgio Paulinho	Portugal	Tinkoff–Saxo	35	DNF-11	—	
208	Paweł Poljański	Poland	Tinkoff–Saxo	25	35	+ 1h 16' 20"	
209	Peter Sagan	Slovakia	Tinkoff–Saxo	25	DNS-9	—	
211	Fabian Cancellara	Switzerland	Trek Factory Racing	34	DNF-3	—	
212	Markel Irizar	Spain	Trek Factory Racing	35	89	+ 2h 59' 18"	
213	Yaroslav Popovych	Ukraine	Trek Factory Racing	35	132	+ 3h 49' 11"	
214	Fränk Schleck	Luxembourg	Trek Factory Racing	35	24	+ 48' 48"	
215	Jasper Stuyven	Belgium	Trek Factory Racing	23	DNS-9	—	
216	Boy van Poppel	Netherlands	Trek Factory Racing	27	158	+ 4h 57' 31"	
217	Danny van Poppel	Netherlands	Trek Factory Racing	22	141	+ 3h 59' 51"	
218	Riccardo Zoidl	Austria	Trek Factory Racing	27	54	+ 2h 09' 40"	
219	Haimar Zubeldia	Spain	Trek Factory Racing	38	23	+ 45' 19"	

=== By team ===
Team Sky (SKY)
No.	Rider	Pos.
1	Chris Froome (GBR)	DNS-12
2	Ian Boswell (USA)	71
3	Sergio Henao (COL)	22
4	Vasil Kiryienka (BLR)	83
5	Christian Knees (GER)	91
6	Mikel Nieve (ESP)	8
7	Salvatore Puccio (ITA)	77
8	Nicolas Roche (IRL)	26
9	Geraint Thomas (GBR)	69
Directeur sportif: Dario Cioni

AG2R La Mondiale (ALM)
No.	Rider	Pos.
11	Domenico Pozzovivo (ITA)	11
12	Gediminas Bagdonas (LTU)	154
13	Mikaël Cherel (FRA)	51
14	Alexis Gougeard (FRA)	112
15	Blel Kadri (FRA)	150
16	Sébastien Minard (FRA)	96
17	Matteo Montaguti (ITA)	41
18	Rinaldo Nocentini (ITA)	85
19	Johan Vansummeren (BEL)	121
Directeur sportif: Julien Jurdie

Astana (AST)
No.	Rider	Pos.
21	Fabio Aru (ITA)	1
22	Dario Cataldo (ITA)	57
23	Mikel Landa (ESP)	25
24	Vincenzo Nibali (ITA)	DSQ-2
25	Diego Rosa (ITA)	20
26	Luis León Sánchez (ESP)	33
27	Paolo Tiralongo (ITA)	DNF-3
28	Alessandro Vanotti (ITA)	135
29	Andrey Zeits (KAZ)	68
Directeur sportif: Alexander Shefer

BMC Racing Team (BMC)
No.	Rider	Pos.
31	Samuel Sánchez (ESP)	DNF-14
32	Darwin Atapuma (COL)	56
33	Marcus Burghardt (GER)	DNS-3
34	Alessandro De Marchi (ITA)	78
35	Jempy Drucker (LUX)	118
36	Amaël Moinard (FRA)	59
37	Joey Rosskopf (USA)	124
38	Tejay van Garderen (USA)	DNF-8
39	Peter Velits (SVK)	DNS-18
Directeur sportif: Yvan Ledanois

Caja Rural–Seguros RGA (CJR)
No.	Rider	Pos.
41	David Arroyo (ESP)	12
42	Carlos Barbero (ESP)	149
43	Pello Bilbao (ESP)	97
44	Omar Fraile (ESP)	88
45	José Gonçalves (POR)	34
46	Ángel Madrazo (ESP)	44
47	Lluís Mas (ESP)	DNF-14
48	Amets Txurruka (ESP)	DNF-11
49	Ricardo Vilela (POR)	48
Directeur sportif: Eugenio Goikoetxea

Cofidis (COF)
No.	Rider	Pos.
51	Nacer Bouhanni (FRA)	DNF-8
52	Yoann Bagot (FRA)	98
53	Romain Hardy (FRA)	DNF-11
54	Cyril Lemoine (FRA)	61
55	Daniel Navarro (ESP)	30
56	Dominique Rollin (CAN)	116
57	Stéphane Rossetto (FRA)	DNF-19
58	Julien Simon (FRA)	74
59	Geoffrey Soupe (FRA)	DNS-14
Directeur sportif: Didier Rous

Colombia (COL)
No.	Rider	Pos.
61	Alex Cano (COL)	53
62	Fabio Duarte (COL)	67
63	Leonardo Duque (COL)	60
64	Walter Pedraza (COL)	136
65	Carlos Quintero (COL)	92
66	Brayan Ramírez (COL)	127
67	Miguel Ángel Rubiano (COL)	70
68	Rodolfo Torres (COL)	32
69	Juan Pablo Valencia (COL)	87
Directeur sportif: Valerio Tebaldi

Etixx–Quick-Step (EQS)
No.	Rider	Pos.
71	Niki Terpstra (NED)	DNS-18
72	Maxime Bouet (FRA)	28
73	Gianluca Brambilla (ITA)	13
74	David de la Cruz (ESP)	DNS-6
75	Iljo Keisse (BEL)	148
76	Nikolas Maes (BEL)	107
77	Pieter Serry (BEL)	62
78	Martin Velits (SVK)	117
79	Carlos Verona (ESP)	29
Directeur sportif: Rik Van Slycke

FDJ (FDJ)
No.	Rider	Pos.
81	Kenny Elissonde (FRA)	16
82	Arnaud Courteille (FRA)	DNF-19
83	Mickaël Delage (FRA)	109
84	Murilo Fischer (BRA)	156
85	Olivier Le Gac (FRA)	120
86	Lorrenzo Manzin (FRA)	DNF-10
87	Laurent Pichon (FRA)	111
88	Kévin Reza (FRA)	113
89	Jussi Veikkanen (FIN)	DNF-11
Directeur sportif: Frank Pineau

IAM Cycling (IAM)
No.	Rider	Pos.
91	Sylvain Chavanel (FRA)	47
92	Marcel Aregger (SUI)	106
93	Jérôme Coppel (FRA)	DNS-20
94	Thomas Degand (BEL)	DNF-9
95	Simon Pellaud (SUI)	119
96	Matteo Pelucchi (ITA)	DNF-2
97	Vicente Reynés (ESP)	86
98	David Tanner (AUS)	DNF-2
99	Larry Warbasse (USA)	38
Directeur sportif: Eddy Seigneur

Lampre–Merida (LAM)
No.	Rider	Pos.
101	Rubén Plaza (ESP)	45
102	Mattia Cattaneo (ITA)	DNF-13
103	Valerio Conti (ITA)	151
104	Kristijan Đurasek (CRO)	63
105	Tsgabu Grmay (ETH)	125
106	Ilia Koshevoy (BLR)	144
107	Przemysław Niemiec (POL)	DNF-2
108	Nelson Oliveira (POR)	21
109	Maximiliano Richeze (ARG)	152
Directeur sportif: Orlando Maini

Lotto–Soudal (LTS)
No.	Rider	Pos.
111	Kris Boeckmans (BEL)	DNF-8
112	Jasper De Buyst (BEL)	126
113	Bart De Clercq (BEL)	14
114	Thomas De Gendt (BEL)	DNF-14
115	Adam Hansen (AUS)	55
116	Maxime Monfort (BEL)	27
117	Jurgen Van den Broeck (BEL)	DNS-18
118	Tosh Van der Sande (BEL)	49
119	Jelle Vanendert (BEL)	82
Directeur sportif: Mario Aerts

Movistar Team (MOV)
No.	Rider	Pos.
121	Alejandro Valverde (ESP)	7
122	Andrey Amador (CRC)	40
123	Imanol Erviti (ESP)	100
124	Javier Moreno (ESP)	80
125	Nairo Quintana (COL)	4
126	José Joaquín Rojas (ESP)	43
127	Rory Sutherland (AUS)	139
128	Francisco Ventoso (ESP)	81
129	Giovanni Visconti (ITA)	19
Directeur sportif: José Luis Arrieta

MTN–Qhubeka (MTN)
No.	Rider	Pos.
131	Natnael Berhane (ERI)	79
132	Steve Cummings (GBR)	102
133	Songezo Jim (RSA)	137
134	Louis Meintjes (RSA)	10
135	Youcef Reguigui (ALG)	134
136	Kristian Sbaragli (ITA)	105
137	Jay Thomson (RSA)	123
138	Johann van Zyl (RSA)	128
139	Jaco Venter (RSA)	122
Directeur sportif: Jens Zemke

Orica–GreenEDGE (OGE)
No.	Rider	Pos.
141	Esteban Chaves (COL)	5
142	Mitchell Docker (AUS)	DNF-13
143	Caleb Ewan (AUS)	DNF-10
144	Simon Gerrans (AUS)	114
145	Mathew Hayman (AUS)	130
146	Damien Howson (AUS)	147
147	Daryl Impey (RSA)	84
148	Jens Keukeleire (BEL)	93
149	Cameron Meyer (AUS)	DNS-18
Directeur sportif: Neil Stephens

Cannondale–Garmin (TCG)
No.	Rider	Pos.
151	Andrew Talansky (USA)	DNS-18
152	André Cardoso (POR)	18
153	Joe Dombrowski (USA)	46
154	Alex Howes (USA)	129
155	Ben King (USA)	75
156	Dan Martin (IRL)	DNF-8
157	Matej Mohorič (SLO)	DNF-6
158	Moreno Moser (ITA)	72
159	Davide Villella (ITA)	94
Directeur sportif: Bingen Fernández

Team Europcar (EUC)
No.	Rider	Pos.
161	Pierre Rolland (FRA)	50
162	Yukiya Arashiro (JPN)	65
163	Jérôme Cousin (FRA)	73
164	Antoine Duchesne (CAN)	138
165	Jimmy Engoulvent (FRA)	133
166	Cyril Gautier (FRA)	58
167	Tony Hurel (FRA)	145
168	Fabrice Jeandesboz (FRA)	17
169	Romain Sicard (FRA)	15
Directeur sportif: Dominique Arnould

Team Giant–Alpecin (TGA)
No.	Rider	Pos.
171	John Degenkolb (GER)	90
172	Lawson Craddock (USA)	42
173	Koen de Kort (NED)	64
174	Tom Dumoulin (NED)	6
175	Johannes Fröhlinger (GER)	143
176	Thierry Hupond (FRA)	142
177	Luka Mezgec (SLO)	108
178	Tom Stamsnijder (NED)	155
179	Zico Waeytens (BEL)	157
Directeur sportif: Christian Guiberteau

Team Katusha (KAT)
No.	Rider	Pos.
181	Joaquim Rodríguez (ESP)	2
182	Vladimir Isaichev (RUS)	DNS-1
183	Pavel Kochetkov (RUS)	76
184	Alberto Losada (ESP)	31
185	Tiago Machado (POR)	36
186	Daniel Moreno (ESP)	9
187	Gatis Smukulis (LAT)	146
188	Ángel Vicioso (ESP)	103
189	Eduard Vorganov (RUS)	39
Directeur sportif: José Azevedo

LottoNL–Jumbo (TLJ)
No.	Rider	Pos.
191	George Bennett (NZL)	37
192	Martijn Keizer (NED)	153
193	Bert-Jan Lindeman (NED)	99
194	Timo Roosen (NED)	95
195	Mike Teunissen (NED)	104
196	Maarten Tjallingii (NED)	DNS-19
197	Tom Van Asbroeck (BEL)	110
198	Dennis van Winden (NED)	115
199	Maarten Wynants (BEL)	DNS-13
Directeur sportif: Merijn Zeeman

Tinkoff–Saxo (TCS)
No.	Rider	Pos.
201	Rafał Majka (POL)	3
202	Daniele Bennati (ITA)	131
203	Maciej Bodnar (POL)	140
204	Pavel Brutt (RUS)	101
205	Jesper Hansen (DEN)	52
206	Jay McCarthy (AUS)	66
207	Sérgio Paulinho (POR)	DNF-11
208	Paweł Poljański (POL)	35
209	Peter Sagan (SVK)	DNS-9
Directeur sportif: Tristan Hoffman

Trek Factory Racing (TFR)
No.	Rider	Pos.
211	Fabian Cancellara (SUI)	DNF-3
212	Markel Irizar (ESP)	89
213	Yaroslav Popovych (UKR)	132
214	Fränk Schleck (LUX)	24
215	Jasper Stuyven (BEL)	DNS-9
216	Boy van Poppel (NED)	158
217	Danny van Poppel (NED)	141
218	Riccardo Zoidl (AUT)	54
219	Haimar Zubeldia (ESP)	23
Directeur sportif: Dirk Demol

=== By nationality ===
The 198 riders that competed in the 2015 Vuelta a España represented 37 countries. Riders from twelve countries won stages during the race; the largest number of stage wins for any country was four, achieved by both the Spanish riders and the Dutch riders.

Country	No. of riders	Finishers	Stage wins
Algeria	1	1	
Argentina	1	1	
Australia	10	6	1 (Caleb Ewan)
Austria	1	1	
Belarus	2	2	
Belgium	18	12	1 (Jasper Stuyven)
Brazil	1	1	
Canada	2	2	
Colombia	13	13	2 (Esteban Chaves ×2)
Costa Rica	1	1	
Croatia	1	1	
Denmark	1	1	
Eritrea	1	1	
Ethiopia	1	1	
Finland	1	0	
France	30	23	1 (Alexis Gougeard)
Germany	4	3	1 (John Degenkolb)
Great Britain	3	2	
Ireland	2	1	1 (Nicolas Roche)
Italy	20	16	2 (Alessandro De Marchi, Kristian Sbaragli)
Japan	1	1	
Kazakhstan	1	1	
Latvia	1	1	
Lithuania	1	1	
Luxembourg	2	2	1 (Fränk Schleck)
Netherlands	12	10	4 (Tom Dumoulin ×2, Bert-Jan Lindeman, Danny van Poppel)
New Zealand	1	1	
Poland	4	3	
Portugal	6	5	1 (Nelson Oliveira)
Russia	4	3	
Slovakia	3	1	1 (Peter Sagan)
Slovenia	2	1	
South Africa	6	6	
Spain	27	23	4 (Mikel Landa, Rubén Plaza, Joaquim Rodríguez, Alejandro Valverde)
Switzerland	3	2	
Ukraine	1	1	
United States	9	7	
Total	198	158	20 (Note: The team time trial on stage 1, won by BMC Racing Team, is not counted in this total.)
