= 2015 Vuelta a España, Stage 12 to Stage 21 =

Cycle race

The route of the 2015 Vuelta a España

The 2015 Vuelta a España was a three-week Grand Tour cycling race that took place principally in Spain between 22 August and 13 September 2015; two stages also took place partly or wholly in Andorra. The final ten stages took the race from the mountains of Andorra to the conclusion of the Vuelta in Madrid. After the first eleven stages, Fabio Aru (Astana) held the race lead, around half a minute ahead of Joaquim Rodríguez (Team Katusha) and Tom Dumoulin (Team Giant–Alpecin).

Stage 12 was a flat stage, won by Danny van Poppel (Trek Factory Racing). Stage 13 was won by Nelson Oliveira (Lampre–Merida) from the breakaway; it was followed by a series of three consecutive summit finishes. The first of these was won by Alessandro De Marchi (BMC Racing Team), as Aru and Rodríguez gained time on Dumoulin. Rodríguez won stage 15, putting him just one second behind Aru, while Dumoulin again lost significant time. Stage 16 was the final summit finish of the race and the final stage of the second week. It was won by Fränk Schleck (Trek Factory Racing), again from the breakaway. Rodríguez gained further time on Aru and took over the race lead, though only by a single second, while Dumoulin again lost time. The following day was a rest day.

The final week of the race began with an individual time trial on stage 17. This was Dumoulin's speciality and he won the stage by over a minute, with all his rivals for the general classification even further behind. He moved into the race lead, three seconds ahead of Aru, while Rodríguez dropped to more than a minute off the race lead. The subsequent three stages were all won by the breakaway, with Aru and his team trying to attack Dumoulin throughout. They were won by Nicolas Roche (Team Sky), Alexis Gougeard (AG2R La Mondiale) and Rubén Plaza (Lampre–Merida) respectively. Plaza's victory came after a 117-kilometre (73 mi) solo breakaway. On the same stage, Aru was finally able to escape from Dumoulin, who lost nearly four minutes and fell to sixth place, while Aru took the overall lead. Stage 21, the final stage of the race, was a sprint stage that took the riders into Madrid. It was won by John Degenkolb (Giant-Alpecin), while Aru sealed his overall victory ahead of Rodríguez and Rafał Majka (Tinkoff–Saxo).

== Classification standings ==
Legend
Red jersey	Denotes the leader of the general classification	Green jersey	Denotes the leader of the points classification
Blue polka dot jersey	Denotes the leader of the mountains classification	White jersey	Denotes the leader of the combination rider classification

== Stage 12 ==
3 September 2015 — Escaldes-Engordany, Andorra to Lleida, 173 km (107 mi)

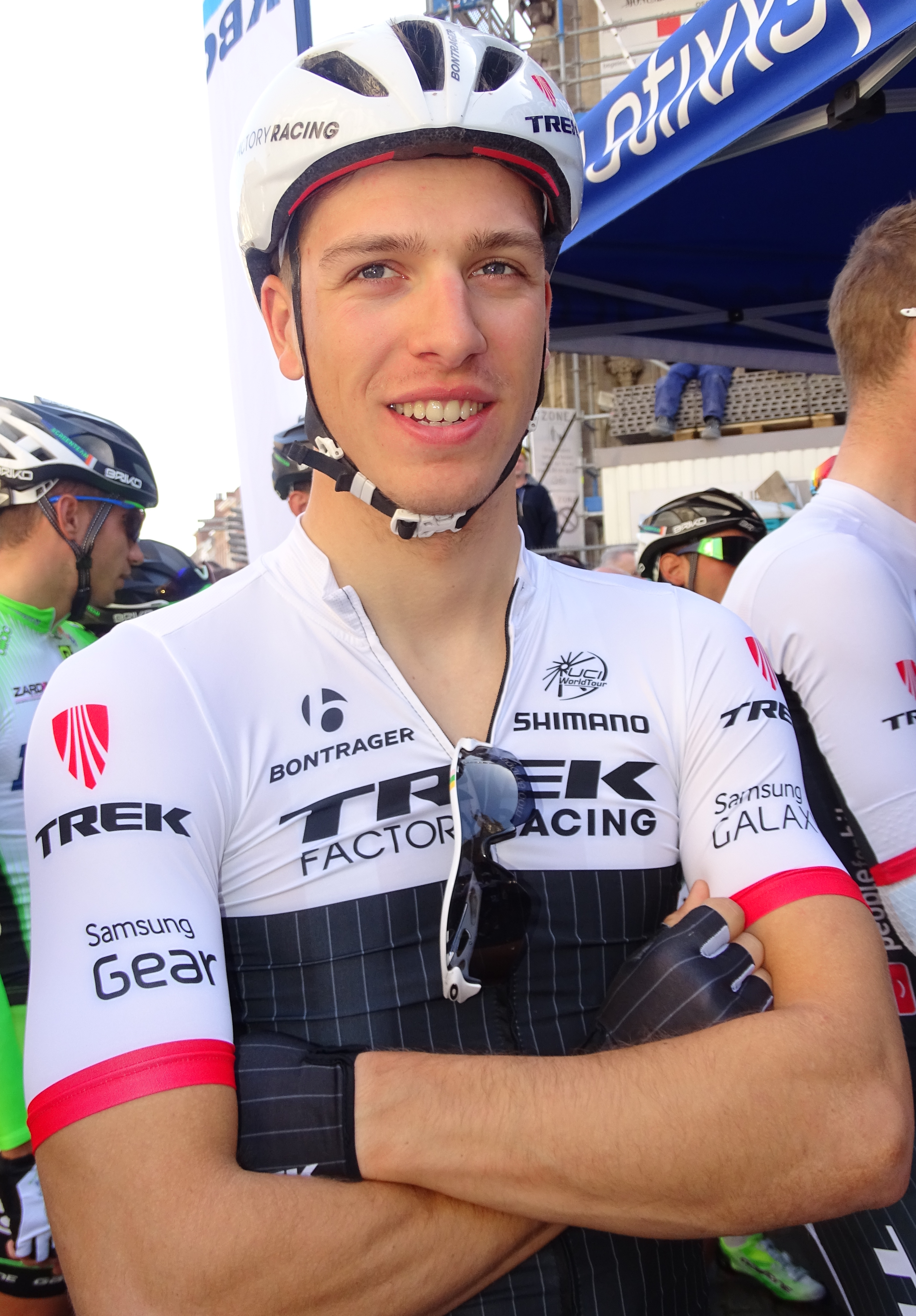
Danny van Poppel (Trek Factory Racing) won the sprint finish to stage 12 (pictured at the 2015 Brabantse Pijl).

Stage 12 started in Escaldes-Engordany, on the outskirts of Andorra la Vella, but the riders immediately left Andorra to return to Spain for the remainder of the Vuelta. The stage was much flatter than the previous day: there was just one categorised climb on the route. This was the second-category Coll de Bóixols (15.8 kilometres (9.8 mi) at 5%). The summit came after 55 kilometres (34 mi) of racing, with 118 kilometres (73 mi) to the finish line. The remainder of the stage was mostly flat, and the finish was relatively uncomplicated: there were 5 kilometres (3.1 mi) of straight roads leading into Lleida, with only two roundabouts. The stage was expected to suit the sprinters, as their teams would have plenty of time after the climb to catch a breakaway.

Despite Oleg Tinkov's threat to pull Tinkoff–Saxo from the race, all the teams started the race in Andorra, with Chris Froome (Team Sky) the only rider not to start the stage. The day's breakaway was fairly quick to form: Maxime Bouet (Etixx–Quick-Step), Miguel Ángel Rubiano (Colombia), Jaco Venter (MTN–Qhubeka), Bert-Jan Lindeman (LottoNL–Jumbo) and Alexis Gougeard (AG2R La Mondiale) escaped early in the stage. Bouet was the best-placed of the riders on the general classification, over twenty minutes behind Fabio Aru (Astana). They led over the Coll de Bóixols (Bouet was the first to the summit) and built a three-minute lead over the peloton. Astana were unwilling to commit to the chase, so the peloton was generally led by Team Giant–Alpecin and Trek Factory Racing.

The five riders in the breakaway rode strongly and the peloton was forced to ride hard all day to chase down their lead. With 15 kilometres (9.3 mi) remaining, the breakaway had a lead of 1' 20". A few kilometres later, the lead was under a minute. Trek Factory Racing's efforts stopped around 12 kilometres (7.5 mi) from the end of the stage, when their sprinter Danny van Poppel suffered a flat tyre. After a conversation with the team, van Poppel decided to change his wheel. He then chased back into the peloton through the team cars and several teammates helped him back to the front of the group; other riders remained at the front to chase the breakaway down after van Poppel had rejoined the group.

With 2 kilometres (1.2 mi) remaining, the breakaway had not been caught and still had a lead of 20". Bouet and Gougeard both attacked and were brought back. Venter then attacked in the final 1 kilometre (0.62 mi), with only Bouet able to follow, but they were caught by the peloton as the road rose to the finish line. The sprint was disorganised, with only LottoNL–Jumbo attempting to control it. Daryl Impey (Orica–GreenEDGE) sprinted first; van Poppel followed and came around him to take the stage victory. Impey held on to take second place with Tosh Van der Sande (Lotto–Soudal) third. The victory was van Poppel's first Grand Tour stage victory. All the general classification riders finished in the peloton with the standings unchanged.

Result of stage 12
Rank	Rider	Team	Time
1	Danny van Poppel (NED)	Trek Factory Racing	4hr 02' 11"
2	Daryl Impey (RSA)	Orica–GreenEDGE	+ 0"
3	Tosh Van der Sande (BEL)	Lotto–Soudal	+ 0"
4	Nikolas Maes (BEL)	Etixx–Quick-Step	+ 0"
5	John Degenkolb (GER)	Team Giant–Alpecin	+ 0"
6	Jempy Drucker (LUX)	BMC Racing Team	+ 0"
7	Tom Van Asbroeck (BEL)	LottoNL–Jumbo	+ 0"
8	Kristian Sbaragli (ITA)	MTN–Qhubeka	+ 0"
9	José Joaquín Rojas (ESP)	Movistar Team	+ 0"
10	Leonardo Duque (COL)	Colombia	+ 0"
Source: ProCyclingStats

General classification after stage 12
Rank	Rider	Team	Time
1	Fabio Aru (ITA)	Astana	47hr 14' 30"
2	Joaquim Rodríguez (ESP)	Team Katusha	+ 27"
3	Tom Dumoulin (NED)	Team Giant–Alpecin	+ 30"
4	Rafał Majka (POL)	Tinkoff–Saxo	+ 1' 28"
5	Esteban Chaves (COL)	Orica–GreenEDGE	+ 1' 29"
6	Alejandro Valverde (ESP)	Movistar Team	+ 1' 52"
7	Daniel Moreno (ESP)	Team Katusha	+ 1' 54"
8	Mikel Nieve (ESP)	Team Sky	+ 1' 58"
9	Nairo Quintana (COL)	Movistar Team	+ 3' 07"
10	Louis Meintjes (RSA)	MTN–Qhubeka	+ 4' 15"
Source: ProCyclingStats

== Stage 13 ==
4 September 2015 — Calatayud to Tarazona, 178 km (111 mi)

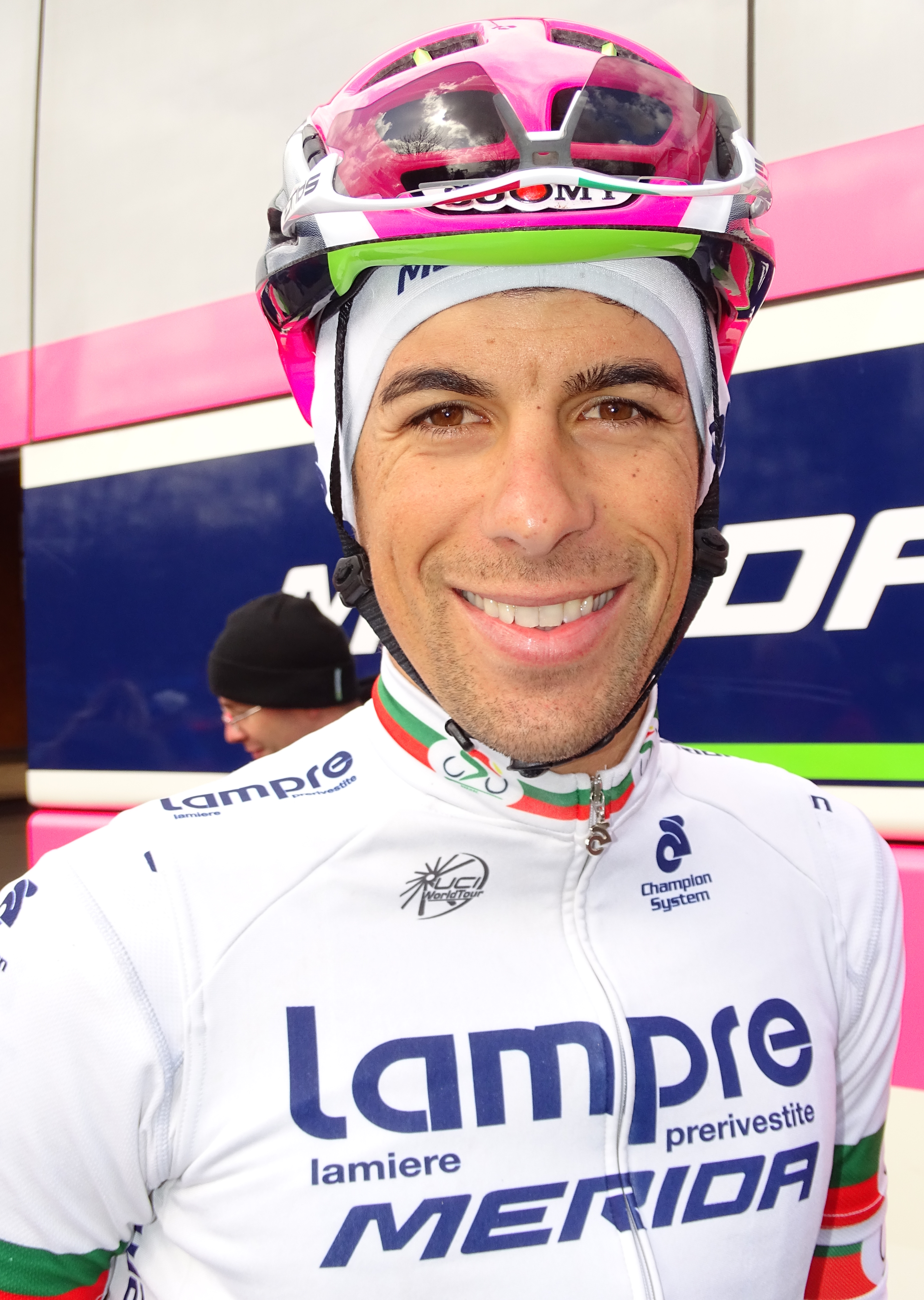
Nelson Oliveira (Lampre–Merida), the national champion of Portugal, won stage 13 in a solo move (photograph from the 2015 Three Days of De Panne).

The thirteenth stage was the last before three consecutive summit finishes. The stage covered a 177-kilometre (110 mi) route from Calatayud to Tarazona. There were three categorised climbs: the third-category Alto Collado de Oseja (8.2 kilometres (5.1 mi) at 3.7%) and the first-category Alto de Beratón (10.9 kilometres (6.8 mi) at 4.7%) came in the first half of the stage; the final climb was the third-category Alto de Moncayo (8.5 kilometres (5.3 mi) at 4.5%), the summit of which came with 33.5 kilometres (20.8 mi) to the finish. The stage was expected to suit riders from a breakaway.

As the breakaway was expected to win the stage, the day's racing began with strong competition to get into the move. At one point a group of about 50 riders – more than a quarter of the peloton – was in a lead group, but this was caught before the Alto Collado de Oseja. Sylvain Chavanel (FDJ) initiated the main move of the day on this first climb. Chavanel was then joined by seven other riders: Nelson Oliveira and Rubén Plaza (both Lampre–Merida), Yukiya Arashiro (Team Europcar), Alessandro De Marchi (BMC), Mikaël Cherel (AG2R La Mondiale), Jérôme Coppel (IAM Cycling) and Cameron Meyer (Orica–GreenEDGE). Plaza was the first of the group to cross the summit of the climb. Nairo Quintana (Movistar), who had been in eighth place before the stage, was dropped from the peloton on the climb; his teammates were able to bring him back to the group after the summit.

A second group, containing 16 riders, had formed on the road. These were Sergio Henao and Nicolas Roche (Sky), Rinaldo Nocentini (Ag2r–La Mondiale), David Arroyo (Caja Rural–Seguros RGA), Yoann Bagot and Julien Simon (Cofidis), Niki Terpstra and Gianluca Brambilla (Etixx–Quick-Step), Kenny Elissonde and Kévin Reza (FDJ), Valerio Conti (Lampre–Merida), Maxime Monfort (Lotto–Soudal), José Joaquín Rojas (Movistar), Steve Cummings (MTN–Qhubeka), Romain Sicard (Europcar) and Paweł Poljański (Tinkoff–Saxo). On the climb of the Alto de Beratón, the two lead groups came together to make a 24-man breakaway. Sicard and Brambilla were the two best-placed riders in the breakaway, over six minutes behind Aru, and their presence forced Astana to keep the breakaway within reach; on the descent the lead was around four minutes.

The breakaway stayed together until the final climb. Chavanel and Oliveira were the first to attack, but Poljański was able to come past them and led solo at the top of the climb. He was caught before the descent, however, whereupon Oliveira attacked again. He reached speeds of around 70 km/h (43 mph) and had opened up a large lead by the foot of the descent. Oliveira rode the final 30 kilometres (19 mi) of the stage alone – using his strong time-trialling skills – and was able to maintain his advantage. He was aided by Plaza and Conti, who marked the attacks that came from the rest of the group, and took a solo stage victory. Simon won the sprint for second place, with Roche in second, as the group finished a minute behind Oliveira. This was the first Grand Tour stage win of Oliveira's career.

Towards the end of the stage, there was an attack in the main peloton from Gediminas Bagdonas (AG2R La Mondiale); he finished 4' 43" behind Oliveira. Cycling Weekly described his attack as "strange" and suggested that he had briefly thought he could take the stage victory himself. The rest of the peloton came in five seconds later. The top eight in the general classification were unchanged; Quintana and Louis Meintjes (MTN-Qhubeka) dropped out of the top ten, however, with Sicard and Brambilla moving up thanks to their presence in the day's breakaway.

Result of stage 13
Rank	Rider	Team	Time
1	Nelson Oliveira (POR)	Lampre–Merida	4hr 14' 01"
2	Julien Simon (FRA)	Cofidis	+ 1' 00"
3	Nicolas Roche (IRL)	Team Sky	+ 1' 00"
4	Sylvain Chavanel (FRA)	IAM Cycling	+ 1' 00"
5	José Joaquín Rojas (ESP)	Movistar Team	+ 1' 00"
6	Rinaldo Nocentini (ITA)	AG2R La Mondiale	+ 1' 00"
7	Kévin Reza (FRA)	FDJ	+ 1' 00"
8	Mikaël Cherel (FRA)	AG2R La Mondiale	+ 1' 00"
9	Cameron Meyer (AUS)	Orica–GreenEDGE	+ 1' 00"
10	Maxime Monfort (BEL)	Lotto–Soudal	+ 1' 00"
Source: ProCyclingStats

General classification after stage 13
Rank	Rider	Team	Time
1	Fabio Aru (ITA)	Astana	51hr 33' 19"
2	Joaquim Rodríguez (ESP)	Team Katusha	+ 27"
3	Tom Dumoulin (NED)	Team Giant–Alpecin	+ 30"
4	Rafał Majka (POL)	Tinkoff–Saxo	+ 1' 28"
5	Esteban Chaves (COL)	Orica–GreenEDGE	+ 1' 29"
6	Alejandro Valverde (ESP)	Movistar Team	+ 1' 52"
7	Daniel Moreno (ESP)	Team Katusha	+ 1' 54"
8	Mikel Nieve (ESP)	Team Sky	+ 1' 58"
9	Gianluca Brambilla (ITA)	Etixx–Quick-Step	+ 2' 15"
10	Romain Sicard (FRA)	Team Europcar	+ 2' 15"
Source: ProCyclingStats

== Stage 14 ==
5 September 2015 — Vitoria-Gasteiz to Alto Campoo, Fuente del Chivo, 215 km (134 mi)

Profile of stage 14

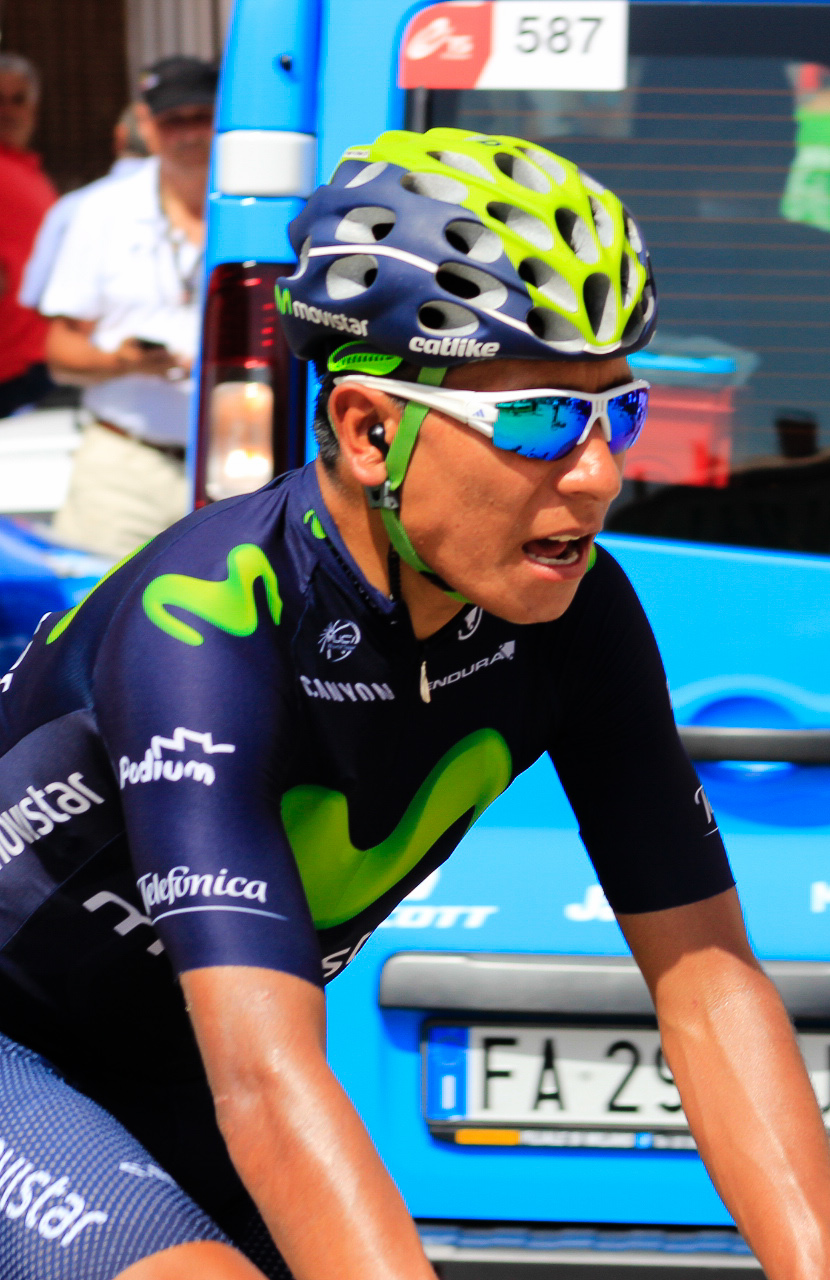
Nairo Quintana (Movistar Team), photographed during stage 8, finished sixth and took back several seconds on his general classification rivals.

The fourteenth stage was the first of three consecutive summit finishes. It began in Vitoria-Gasteiz, the capital of the Basque Country, and took the riders 215 kilometres (134 mi) to Alto Campoo. The stage included three categorised climbs, all of which came in the second half of the stage. The first 105 kilometres (65 mi) of the stage took the riders west, before the riders reached the first categorised climb. This was the third-category Puerto Estacas de Trueba (11 kilometres (6.8 mi) at 2.9%). After the descent, the riders immediately climbed the first-category Puerto del Escudo (11.5 kilometres (7.1 mi) at 6.4%). There was then a flat section of around 40 kilometres (25 mi) that took the riders to the foot of the final climb. This was the Alto Campoo (18 kilometres (11 mi) at 5.5%). The climb was fairly regular and, though long, was not particularly steep and was not expected to result in large gaps between the general classification riders.

There was again aggressive racing for the first hour to get into the breakaway. Alessandro De Marchi (BMC) attacked three times during this period. The third attack came after 50 kilometres (31 mi) and ended up forming the day's main breakaway. De Marchi was joined by Salvatore Puccio (Sky), José Joaquín Rojas (Movistar), Mikaël Cherel (AG2R La Mondiale) and Carlos Quintero (Colombia). Cherel was the best-placed rider on the general classification; he was, however, over an hour down, so there was no urgent need for the peloton to chase. At the top of the first climb, the five riders had a lead of over eight minutes. This extended to nearly ten minutes following the descent and was still over nine minutes at the base of the day's final climb. Cherel was the first to attack and Puccio was the first of the riders to be dropped, though he quickly came back to the group. De Marchi pulled the other three riders back to Cherel, whereupon attacks came from Puccio and Rojas. De Marchi dropped Cherel and Quintero, then caught Rojas. With 900 metres (3,000 ft) remaining, he passed Puccio and went on to take the stage victory. Puccio finished 21 seconds further back in second place, with Rojas another 11 seconds behind in third.

Astana, meanwhile, led the peloton in support of Aru. Luis León Sánchez and Mikel Landa were the first to apply pressure on the climb; Tom Dumoulin (Team Giant–Alpecin) was isolated from most of his teammates as the group was reduced to around 40 riders. Dario Cataldo took over and, when he tired, Aru attacked and only Quintana was able to follow for long. Rodríguez and Chaves were eventually able to catch Aru and Quintana. Quintana attacked on the steepest portion of the climb; he crossed the finish line 3' 32" behind De Marchi in sixth place on the stage. Rodríguez was six seconds behind, with Chaves and Aru a further second back. Alejandro Valverde (Movistar) and Dumoulin finished together, 19 seconds behind Aru. Dumoulin was therefore now 49 seconds behind Aru overall.

Result of stage 14
Rank	Rider	Team	Time
1	Alessandro De Marchi (ITA)	BMC Racing Team	5hr 43' 12"
2	Salvatore Puccio (ITA)	Team Sky	+ 21"
3	José Joaquín Rojas (ESP)	Movistar Team	+ 32"
4	Mikaël Cherel (FRA)	AG2R La Mondiale	+ 38"
5	Carlos Quintero (COL)	Colombia	+ 1' 00"
6	Nairo Quintana (COL)	Movistar Team	+ 3' 32"
7	Joaquim Rodríguez (ESP)	Team Katusha	+ 3' 38"
8	Esteban Chaves (COL)	Orica–GreenEDGE	+ 3' 39"
9	Fabio Aru (ITA)	Astana	+ 3' 39"
10	Rafał Majka (POL)	Tinkoff–Saxo	+ 3' 44"
Source: ProCyclingStats

General classification after stage 14
Rank	Rider	Team	Time
1	Fabio Aru (ITA)	Astana	57hr 20' 10"
2	Joaquim Rodríguez (ESP)	Team Katusha	+ 26"
3	Tom Dumoulin (NED)	Team Giant–Alpecin	+ 49"
4	Esteban Chaves (COL)	Orica–GreenEDGE	+ 1' 29"
5	Rafał Majka (POL)	Tinkoff–Saxo	+ 1' 33"
6	Mikel Nieve (ESP)	Team Sky	+ 2' 10"
7	Alejandro Valverde (ESP)	Movistar Team	+ 2' 11"
8	Daniel Moreno (ESP)	Team Katusha	+ 2' 13"
9	Nairo Quintana (COL)	Movistar Team	+ 3' 00"
10	Romain Sicard (FRA)	Team Europcar	+ 3' 39"
Source: ProCyclingStats

== Stage 15 ==
6 September 2015 — Comillas to Sotres, Cabrales, 175.8 km (109.2 mi)

Profile of stage 15

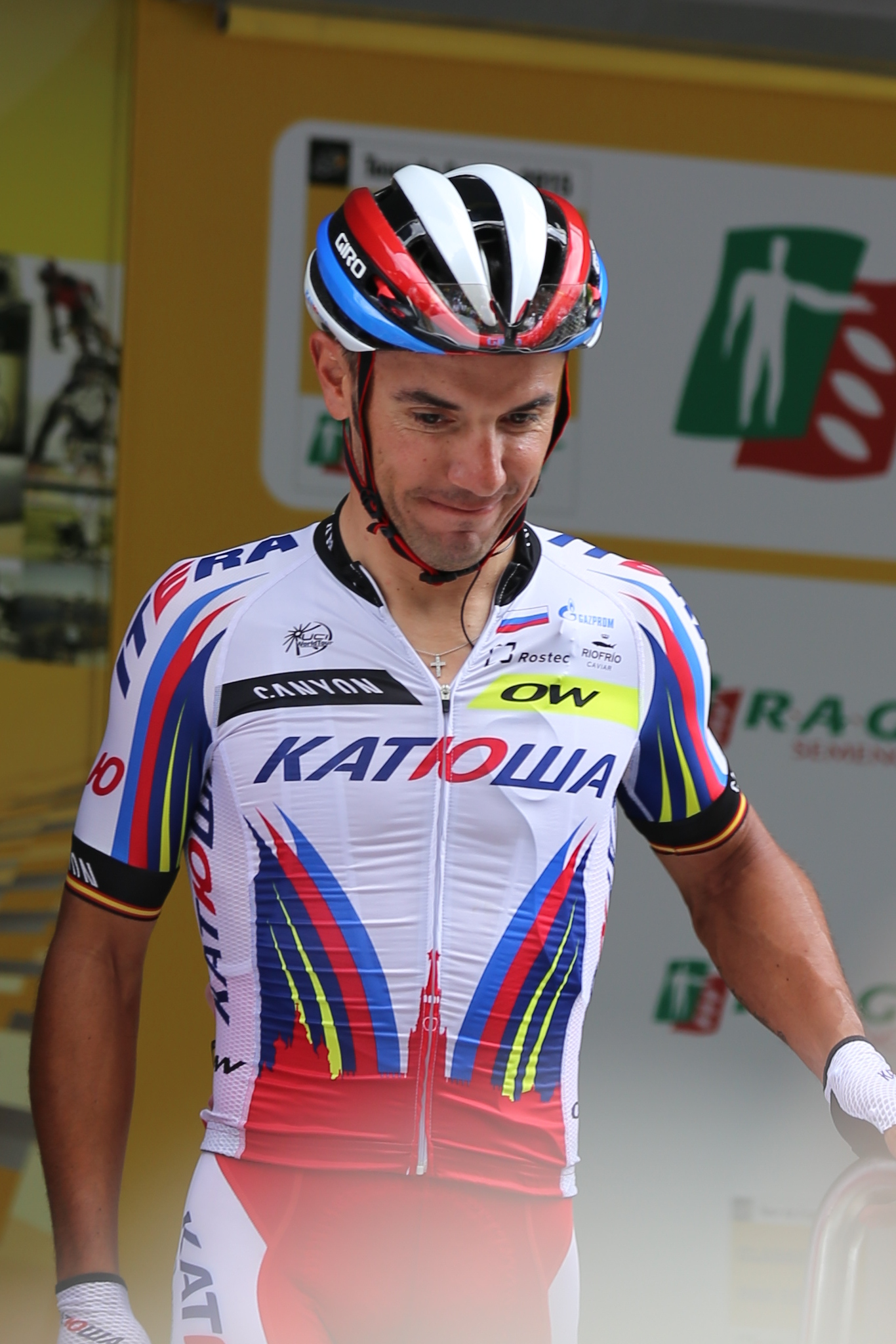
Joaquim Rodríguez (Team Katusha) won stage 15 and closed in on the race lead (photograph from the 2015 Tour de France).

The fifteenth stage was the second of three consecutive stages with summit finishes. It was a 175.8-kilometre (109.2 mi) route from Comillas to Sotres. The first 105 kilometres (65 mi) of the stage were fairly flat. The first climb was the second-category climb of the Alto del Torno (10.1-kilometre (6.3 mi) at 3.2%). The descent was followed by around 20 kilometres (12 mi) of flat roads before the uncategorised climb at Ortiguero. This was followed by more flat roads leading to the base of the final climb, which started after 163 kilometres (101 mi). This was the first-category Alto de Sotres (12.7 kilometres (7.9 mi) at 7.9%). The climb was mixed, with a steep first section, followed by around one kilometre (0.62 mi) of false flat, a section of around 7% and then a very steep final section.

The breakaway again took a long time to form. The peloton had covered around 50 kilometres (31 mi) before a nine-rider group formed. The riders were Blel Kadri (AG2R-La Mondiale), Ricardo Vilela (Caja Rural–Seguros RGA), Dominique Rollin (Cofidis), Brayan Ramírez (Colombia), Nikolas Maes (Etixx–Quick-Step), Natnael Berhane (MTN-Qhubeka), Pierre Rolland (Europcar), Maarten Tjallingii (Lotto NL-Jumbo), and Haimar Zubeldia (Trek Factory Racing). The breakaway was chased hard by Movistar, who were working to improve Nairo Quintana's overall position in the race and their lead never went over five minutes. After Rollin was the first to the summit of the Alto del Torno, the lead dropped quickly; the breakaway had just two minutes' lead at the base of the final climb.

As Movistar continued to ride hard at the beginning of the climb, most of the break was caught, with only Zubeldia able to continue alone for any length of time. He was caught with around 10 kilometres (6.2 mi) remaining. Quintana put in an attack at this point, but he was marked by Luis León Sánchez, as the rest of the Astana team brought the move back. Astana continued setting the pace most of the way up the climb. Dumoulin was struggling to stay with the group with around 7 kilometres (4.3 mi) remaining and he was dropped shortly afterwards. He spent the rest of the climb riding at tempo to attempt to limit his losses. Giovanni Visconti (Movistar) took up the pace-setting at the front of the group. In the last 2 kilometres (1.2 mi), however, Joaquim Rodríguez put in a strong attack that dropped Quintana, along with most of the other riders. Aru and Majka attempted to chase; Aru then dropped off and was caught by Esteban Chaves (Orica–GreenEDGE), Landa and Quintana. Rodríguez continued on to take the stage victory – his tenth in the Vuelta – with Majka 12 seconds behind in second place. Quintana and Aru finished together, 15 seconds behind Rodríguez. Dumoulin, who had at one point been over 1' 20" behind, finished in eleventh place on the stage, 51 seconds back.

At the end of the stage, Aru retained the red jersey, but Rodríguez was now just one second behind. Dumoulin dropped to fourth place – 1' 25" behind Aru – with Majka moving up into third. Rodríguez also took the lead in both the points and combination classifications.

Result of stage 15
Rank	Rider	Team	Time
1	Joaquim Rodríguez (ESP)	Team Katusha	4hr 33' 31"
2	Rafał Majka (POL)	Tinkoff–Saxo	+ 12"
3	Daniel Moreno (ESP)	Team Katusha	+ 14"
4	Nairo Quintana (COL)	Movistar Team	+ 15"
5	Fabio Aru (ITA)	Astana	+ 15"
6	Mikel Landa (ESP)	Astana	+ 18"
7	Esteban Chaves (COL)	Orica–GreenEDGE	+ 20"
8	Mikel Nieve (ESP)	Team Sky	+ 24"
9	Alejandro Valverde (ESP)	Movistar Team	+ 29"
10	Domenico Pozzovivo (ITA)	AG2R La Mondiale	+ 41"
Source: ProCyclingStats

General classification after stage 15
Rank	Rider	Team	Time
1	Fabio Aru (ITA)	Astana	61hr 53' 56"
2	Joaquim Rodríguez (ESP)	Team Katusha	+ 1"
3	Rafał Majka (POL)	Tinkoff–Saxo	+ 1' 24"
4	Tom Dumoulin (NED)	Team Giant–Alpecin	+ 1' 25"
5	Esteban Chaves (COL)	Orica–GreenEDGE	+ 1' 34"
6	Daniel Moreno (ESP)	Team Katusha	+ 2' 08"
7	Mikel Nieve (ESP)	Team Sky	+ 2' 19"
8	Alejandro Valverde (ESP)	Movistar Team	+ 2' 25"
9	Nairo Quintana (COL)	Movistar Team	+ 3' 00"
10	Louis Meintjes (RSA)	MTN–Qhubeka	+ 5' 07"
Source: ProCyclingStats

== Stage 16 ==
7 September 2015 — Luarca to Ermita del Alba, Quirós, 185 km (115 mi)

Profile of stage 16

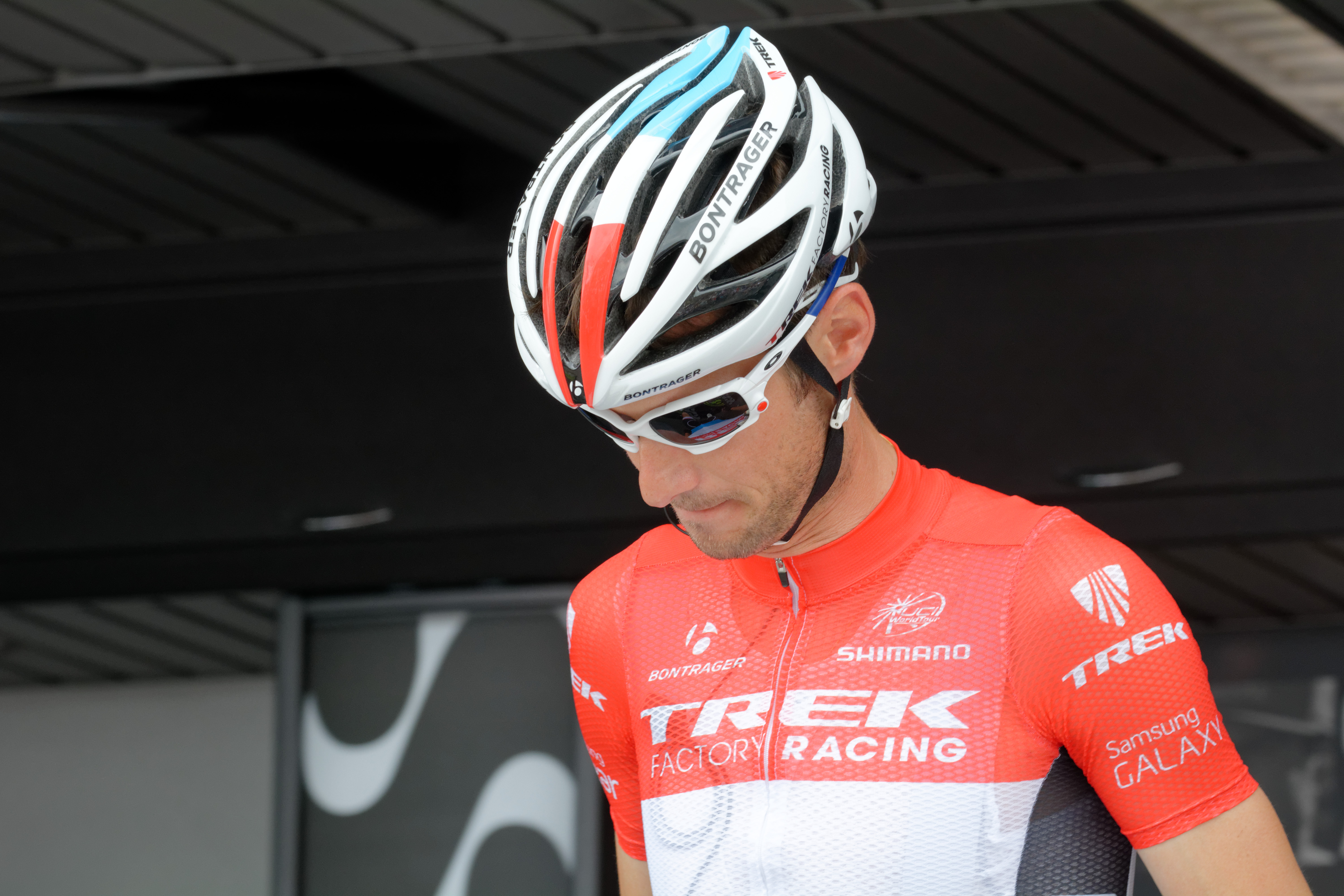
Fränk Schleck (Trek Factory Racing) won stage 16, his first Grand Tour victory in over six years (photographed at the 2015 Tour de Suisse).

The sixteenth stage was the final stage of the second week of the race. It was the third of three consecutive summit finishes and included seven categorised climbs as the race entered the Cantabrian Mountains. The stage was a 185-kilometre (115 mi) route from Luarca to Quirós. The road climbed from the very start: the third-category Alto de Aristébano (14.6 kilometres (9.1 mi) at 3.4%) began at the end of the neutral zone. After the descent and some small uncategorised climbs came the second-category Alto de Piedratecha (10.6 kilometres (6.6 mi) at 4.8%), the summit of which came after 43 kilometres (27 mi). This was followed by a plateau and a long descent, then the third-category Alto de Cabruñana (4.8 kilometres (3.0 mi) at 6.7%). Around 25 kilometres (16 mi) of flat roads followed, before the second-category climb of the Alto del Tenebredo (3.7 kilometres (2.3 mi) at 8.9%). There was then a descent and around 15 kilometres (9.3 mi) of flat roads. At this point there were 43.5 kilometres (27.0 mi) remaining, which included almost no flat roads. First came the second-category climb of the Alto del Cordal (8.5 kilometres (5.3 mi) at 5.7%), then the first-category Alto de la Cobertoria (9.8 kilometres (6.1 mi) at 8.7%). These climbs often come before the famous climb of the Alto de l'Angliru, but the 2015 edition of the race introduced a new climb, the special-category Alto Ermita de Alba. This was a 6.8-kilometre (4.2 mi) climb at 11.1%, including sections at over 20%. The Alto Ermita de Alba was described by Javier Guillén, the race director, as "very tough".

A ten-rider breakaway formed quickly at the beginning of the stage. The riders were Fränk Schleck (Trek Factory Racing), Rodolfo Torres (Colombia), Moreno Moser (Cannondale–Garmin), Cyril Lemoine (Cofidis), Larry Warbasse (IAM), George Bennett (LottoNL-Jumbo), Omar Fraile (Caja Rural-Seguros RGA), Carlos Verona (Etixx–Quick-Step), Pierre Rolland (Europcar) and Tsgabu Grmay (Lampre–Mérida). Fraile won each of the first five climbs of the day to extend his lead in the mountains classification. In the peloton, meanwhile, there was a dispute between Astana and Katusha – the teams of Aru and Rodríguez – over who would lead the chase. At one point the lead was over 20 minutes, but eventually Katusha took on the chase and began to bring the lead group back.

The lead group broke up on the penultimate climb, the Alto de la Cobertoria, with Torres and Schleck going clear. They were still 10 minutes ahead of the peloton. The two riders came into the final climb together, with Fraile, Verona and Bennett chasing. Schleck attacked Torres several times on the slopes of the Ermita de Alba. Although Torres was able to follow these initial attacks, Schleck put in another, stronger attack with around 3 kilometres (1.9 mi) to the finish. Schleck rode away on the steepest portion of the climb to take the stage victory – his first victory in a Grand Tour since the 2009 Tour de France and his first ever stage victory in the Vuelta a España. Torres finished second, over a minute behind, with Moser another 38 seconds behind in third.

In the main peloton, the main action came on the final three climbs. Tinkoff–Saxo rode hard on the first of these, the Alto del Cordal, before Astana did the same on the Alto de la Cobertoria. This reduced the peloton to a group of fifteen riders. Despite the attempts of the other teams, Dumoulin was able to follow the other riders. On the final climb, Paweł Poljański put in a strong effort on behalf of Majka, before Landa took over at the front of the group. Landa rode hard all the way up the climb; this caused Aru, his teammate, to struggle, as well as several of the other riders. Alejandro Valverde (Movistar) and Chaves were both dropped in the final 2 kilometres (1.2 mi). Dumoulin held on to the group until the final kilometre. At that moment, Rodríguez attacked and finished first among the general classification riders, nearly nine minutes behind Schleck. Aru chased hard, but finished two seconds behind Rodríguez and so lost the red jersey by one second. Dumoulin lost 27 seconds to Rodríguez, putting him 1' 51" behind the race leader with his strongest discipline – the individual time trial – to come after the rest day.

Result of stage 16
Rank	Rider	Team	Time
1	Fränk Schleck (LUX)	Trek Factory Racing	5hr 49' 56"
2	Rodolfo Torres (COL)	Colombia	+ 1' 10"
3	Moreno Moser (ITA)	Cannondale–Garmin	+ 1' 48"
4	George Bennett (NZL)	LottoNL–Jumbo	+ 2' 42"
5	Pierre Rolland (FRA)	Team Europcar	+ 2' 49"
6	Omar Fraile (ESP)	Caja Rural–Seguros RGA	+ 3' 05"
7	Carlos Verona (ESP)	Etixx–Quick-Step	+ 4' 26"
8	Larry Warbasse (USA)	IAM Cycling	+ 6' 02"
9	Joaquim Rodríguez (ESP)	Team Katusha	+ 8' 51"
10	Fabio Aru (ITA)	Astana	+ 8' 53"
Source: ProCyclingStats

General classification after stage 16
Rank	Rider	Team	Time
1	Joaquim Rodríguez (ESP)	Team Katusha	67hr 52' 44"
2	Fabio Aru (ITA)	Astana	+ 1"
3	Rafał Majka (POL)	Tinkoff–Saxo	+ 1' 35"
4	Tom Dumoulin (NED)	Team Giant–Alpecin	+ 1' 51"
5	Mikel Nieve (ESP)	Team Sky	+ 2' 32"
6	Esteban Chaves (COL)	Orica–GreenEDGE	+ 2' 38"
7	Daniel Moreno (ESP)	Team Katusha	+ 2' 49"
8	Nairo Quintana (COL)	Movistar Team	+ 3' 11"
9	Alejandro Valverde (ESP)	Movistar Team	+ 3' 58"
10	Louis Meintjes (RSA)	MTN–Qhubeka	+ 5' 22"
Source: ProCyclingStats

== Stage 17 ==
9 September 2015 — Burgos, 38.7 km (24 mi) Individual time trial (ITT)

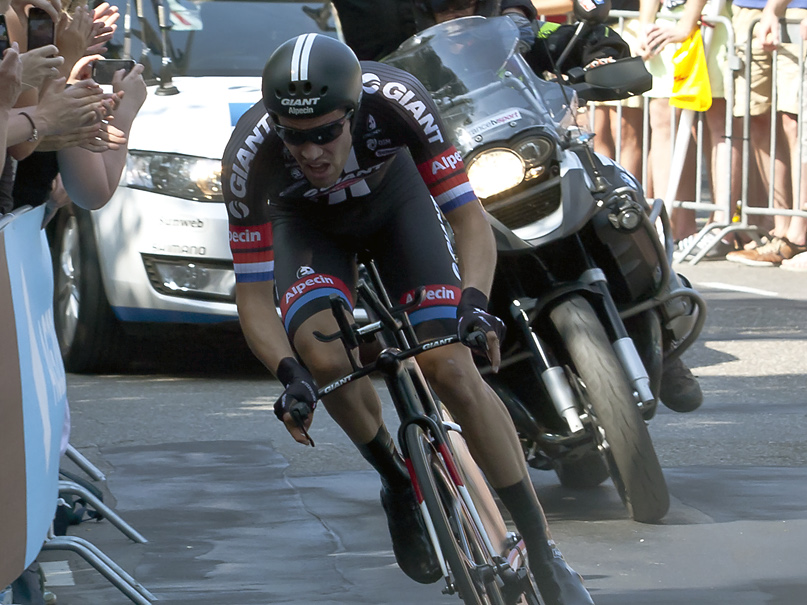
Tom Dumoulin (Team Giant–Alpecin) won stage 17 and took the race lead (photographed during the time trial at the 2015 Tour de France).

The seventeenth stage followed the final rest day of the race and was the only individual time trial of the Vuelta. It started and finished in the city of Burgos and was mostly flat. The route approximately followed a figure-of-eight pattern. The first loop left the city to the east and took the riders to Cardeñajimeno. Here the course turned south towards Carcedo de Burgos, passing the monastery of San Pedro de Cardeña in Castrillo del Val. This was the hilliest portion of the course. The route turned to the north-west in Carcedo de Burgos and returned to Burgos itself after 21.8 kilometres (13.5 mi). The second loop of the course began by taking the riders west and then north across the Arlanzón River. The route continued west until a tight turn with 11.2 kilometres (7.0 mi) to the finish line. After this, the route continued east and passed the city centre to the north. With 6.9 kilometres (4.3 mi) to go, the route turned back into the city. The final part of the course included several tight corners and finished outside Burgos Cathedral. The course was expected to suit the strong rouleurs and time-trialists; it was unusual among recent Vuelta time-trial courses because it did not contain any significant climbs. The course was particularly expected to favour Tom Dumoulin: during the rest day he described the course as "exactly what I like".

The 167 riders remaining in the Vuelta set off in reverse order. Boy van Poppel (Trek Factory Racing) was in last place on the general classification before the stage and therefore was the first to start. The following 137 riders set off at one-minute intervals; the final 29 riders started at two-minute intervals. Joaquim Rodríguez was the last rider to start.

The first rider to set a benchmark time was Gediminas Bagdonas (AG2R-La Mondiale), who finished the course in 49' 22"; Bagdonas caught Boy van Poppel on the finish line, despite starting four minutes behind him. The first significant time, however, was set by Maciej Bodnar (Tinkoff–Saxo), the eighteenth rider to start. He completed the course in 47' 05" and took the lead. Steve Cummings (MTN-Qhubeka) and Vasil Kiryienka (Sky) were among the favourites for the stage victory, but neither was able to challenge Bodnar's time. Two Frenchmen – Jérôme Coppel (IAM) and Romain Sicard (Europcar) – achieved times that would put them in the top 10 at the end of the stage, but Bodnar's time was still leading as the general classification favourites took to the course. As the top five riders were about to start, rain began to fall, although it was not strong enough to affect the riders significantly.

Tom Dumoulin put time into his rivals from the very start of the course. He was first at both the intermediate checkpoints and completed the course in 46' 01", over a minute ahead of Bodnar. Valverde put in a strong time to finish in third place on the day, with his teammate Quintana sixth. Rodríguez, however, looked uncomfortable on his time trial bicycle throughout the course and lost over three minutes to Dumoulin; he fell to third place overall. Fabio Aru put in a strong ride: he finished tenth on the stage, 1' 53" behind Dumoulin. Dumoulin therefore took over the race lead, but he was only three seconds ahead of Aru. Aru described his own position in the race as "not bad at all".

Result of stage 17
Rank	Rider	Team	Time
1	Tom Dumoulin (NED)	Team Giant–Alpecin	46' 01"
2	Maciej Bodnar (POL)	Tinkoff–Saxo	+ 1' 04"
3	Alejandro Valverde (ESP)	Movistar Team	+ 1' 08"
4	Vasil Kiryienka (BLR)	Team Sky	+ 1' 31"
5	Jérôme Coppel (FRA)	IAM Cycling	+ 1' 32"
6	Nairo Quintana (COL)	Movistar Team	+ 1' 33"
7	Romain Sicard (FRA)	Team Europcar	+ 1' 36"
8	Nelson Oliveira (POR)	Lampre–Merida	+ 1' 38"
9	Steve Cummings (GBR)	MTN–Qhubeka	+ 1' 40"
10	Fabio Aru (ITA)	Astana	+ 1' 53"
Source: ProCyclingStats

General classification after stage 17
Rank	Rider	Team	Time
1	Tom Dumoulin (NED)	Team Giant–Alpecin	68hr 40' 36"
2	Fabio Aru (ITA)	Astana	+ 3"
3	Joaquim Rodríguez (ESP)	Team Katusha	+ 1' 15"
4	Rafał Majka (POL)	Tinkoff–Saxo	+ 2' 22"
5	Nairo Quintana (COL)	Movistar Team	+ 2' 53"
6	Alejandro Valverde (ESP)	Movistar Team	+ 3' 15"
7	Esteban Chaves (COL)	Orica–GreenEDGE	+ 3' 30"
8	Daniel Moreno (ESP)	Team Katusha	+ 3' 46"
9	Mikel Nieve (ESP)	Team Sky	+ 4' 10"
10	Louis Meintjes (RSA)	MTN–Qhubeka	+ 6' 51"
Source: ProCyclingStats

== Stage 18 ==
10 September 2015 — Roa de Duero to Riaza, 204 km (127 mi)

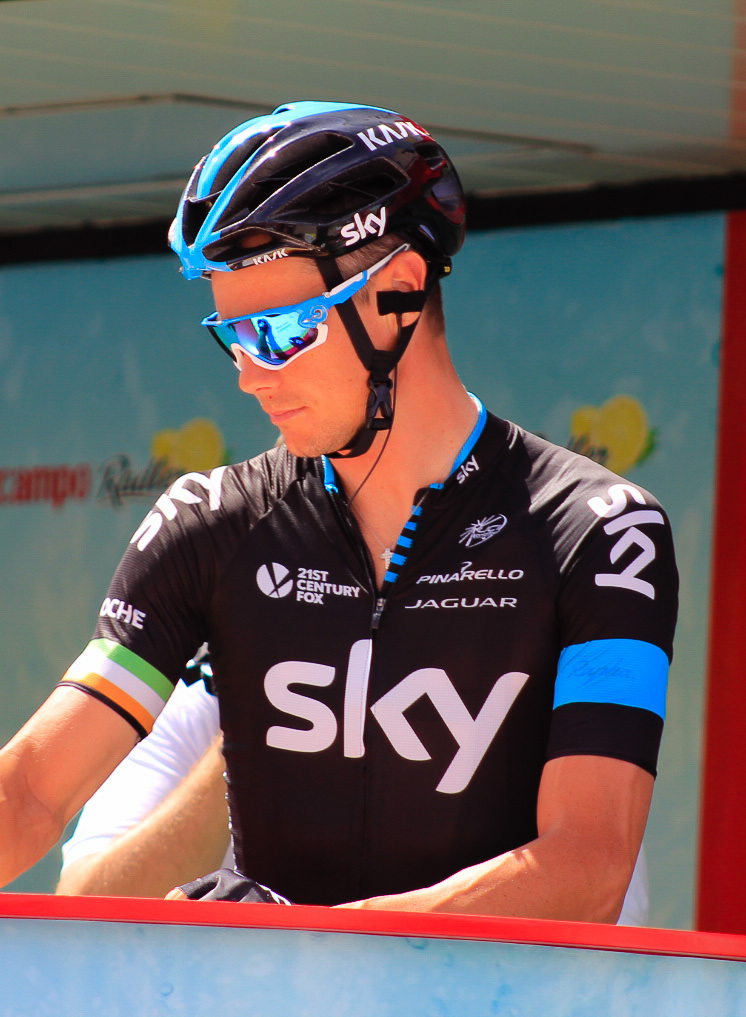
Nicolas Roche (Team Sky), photographed before stage 8, won stage 18 from a breakaway.

Stage 18 was a 204-kilometre (127 mi) route from Roa de Duero to Riaza. The first part of the stage was fairly flat as the peloton travelled southeast. After 75 kilometres (47 mi) was the first climb of the day, the third-category Alto Santibáñez de Ayllón (7.8 kilometres (4.8 mi) at 4%). Soon afterwards was the Alto del Campanario (6.5 kilometres (4.0 mi) at 3.9%). The following 80 kilometres (50 mi) were consistently up and down, with barely any flat roads, as the riders travelled south through the Tejera Negra national park, then north towards the stage finish. The final climb of the day came after 181 kilometres (112 mi). This was the first-category Puerto de la Quesera (10 kilometres (6.2 mi) at 5.2%). From the summit there were 13 kilometres (8.1 mi) of descent to the finish line in Riaza. The stage was expected to favour riders from a breakaway.

The stage again began with a contest to get into the day's breakaway. Eventually a 25-rider breakaway was formed, without any general classification favourites present. Ángel Madrazo (Caja Rural–Seguros RGA) was first at the summit of the first and second climbs of the day, with the peloton over five minutes behind. The break still had a five-minute lead with 50 kilometres (31 mi) to the finish line. Astana came to the front of the peloton in order to support Aru and to attempt to isolate Dumoulin from his teammates; Dumoulin stayed close to Aru's wheel. With 35 kilometres (22 mi) to race, Joaquim Rodríguez put in an attack, but he was chased down by the Astana team.

In the breakaway, Cyril Gautier (Europcar) attacked just before the final climb. On the climb, he was caught and passed by two other riders from the breakaway: Nicolas Roche (Sky) and Haimar Zubeldia (Trek Factory Racing). Roche led over the summit of the Puerto de la Quesera. Astana's work had significantly reduced the breakaway's lead: midway through the climb they were 1' 30" behind the breakaway. There were several attacks during the climb: Aru attacked Dumoulin six times, with Valverde and Chaves also attempting to escape from the group of favourites. None of them were able to get away, however, and the group came to the top of the climb together, a minute behind Roche and Zubeldia.

Roche and Zubeldia came to the finish line together. Roche ensured the stage ended in a fast sprint and took the stage victory. This was Roche's second stage victory in the Vuelta and his first for Team Sky. José Gonçalves (Caja Rural–Seguros RGA), another rider from the early breakaway, finished third, 18" behind Roche. The group of favourites finished together a further 20" back, with no changes to the top 10. Omar Fraile, meanwhile, was almost assured of victory in the mountains classification: his 50-point lead over Fränk Schleck was more than the points available on the remaining stages.

Result of stage 18
Rank	Rider	Team	Time
1	Nicolas Roche (IRL)	Team Sky	5h 03' 59"
2	Haimar Zubeldia (ESP)	Trek Factory Racing	+ 0"
3	José Gonçalves (POR)	Caja Rural–Seguros RGA	+ 18"
4	Alejandro Valverde (ESP)	Movistar Team	+ 38"
5	Esteban Chaves (COL)	Orica–GreenEDGE	+ 38"
6	Joaquim Rodríguez (ESP)	Team Katusha	+ 38"
7	Pieter Serry (BEL)	Etixx–Quick-Step	+ 38"
8	Adam Hansen (AUS)	Lotto–Soudal	+ 38"
9	Gianluca Brambilla (ITA)	Etixx–Quick-Step	+ 38"
10	Domenico Pozzovivo (ITA)	AG2R La Mondiale	+ 38"
Source: ProCyclingStats

General classification after stage 18
Rank	Rider	Team	Time
1	Tom Dumoulin (NED)	Team Giant–Alpecin	73hr 45' 13"
2	Fabio Aru (ITA)	Astana	+ 3"
3	Joaquim Rodríguez (ESP)	Team Katusha	+ 1' 15"
4	Rafał Majka (POL)	Tinkoff–Saxo	+ 2' 22"
5	Nairo Quintana (COL)	Movistar Team	+ 2' 53"
6	Alejandro Valverde (ESP)	Movistar Team	+ 3' 15"
7	Esteban Chaves (COL)	Orica–GreenEDGE	+ 3' 30"
8	Daniel Moreno (ESP)	Team Katusha	+ 3' 46"
9	Mikel Nieve (ESP)	Team Sky	+ 4' 10"
10	Louis Meintjes (RSA)	MTN–Qhubeka	+ 6' 51"
Source: ProCyclingStats

== Stage 19 ==
11 September 2015 — Medina del Campo to Ávila, 185.8 km (115 mi)

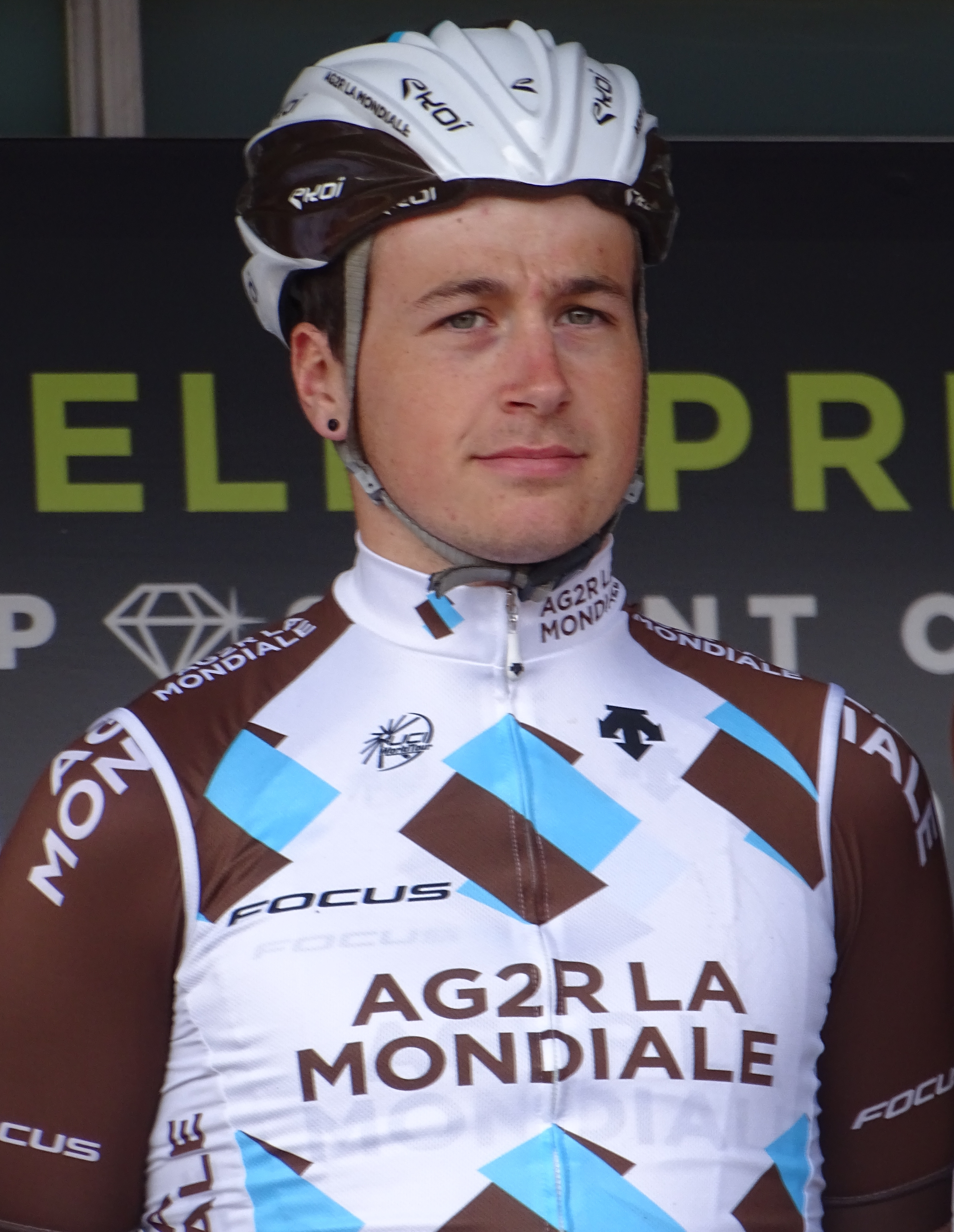
Alexis Gougeard (AG2R La Mondiale) won stage 19 from a breakaway (photographed at the 2015 Scheldeprijs).

Stage 19 was another moderately hilly stage, with a climb and a descent shortly before the finish. It was a 185.8 kilometres (115 mi) route from Medina del Campo to Ávila. The route started with a long section of flat roads that took the riders south through the city of Ávila and across the finish line for the first time, with 99 kilometres (62 mi) left in the stage. There was then a loop to the south-east of the city, which began with the climb of the third-category Alto de Valdavia (13 kilometres (8.1 mi) at 2.7%). There was then a long descent and a gradual ascent before the final categorised climb of the day. This was the second-category Alto de la Paramera (8.7 kilometres (5.4 mi) at 4.5%). The summit of the climb came with 19 kilometres (12 mi) to the finish, and the riders descended back into Ávila. As they entered the city, the road rose steeply on cobbled roads to the finish line.

Unlike several of the previous days, the breakaway was quick to form. It was made up of 24 riders and went clear after 6 kilometres (3.7 mi) of racing. They quickly built a lead of over 15 minutes. The first significant incident of the day was a crash in the main peloton after 72 kilometres (45 mi). Fabio Aru fell to the ground, while Tom Dumoulin was among the riders delayed. Although Aru made several trips to the medical car after the incident, he was not badly injured. The peloton was led throughout the stage by Giant-Alpecin.

With 44 kilometres (27 mi) to the end of the stage, Tiago Machado (Katusha) attacked the breakaway. Markel Irizar (Trek Factory Racing) attempted to follow him but suffered a puncture. Although Machado had a lead of 30 seconds at one point, there was a chase from the group behind and his lead fell. Two riders then bridged across to Machado. These were Alexis Gougeard (AG2R-La Mondiale) and Leonardo Duque (Colombia). The three-man group built a lead that increased to 50 seconds. Duque was dropped from the group and was caught by Maxime Monfort (Lotto–Soudal) and Natnael Berhane (MTN-Qhubeka), who had also attacked the breakaway group. On the final categorised climb, with 22.5 kilometres (14.0 mi) remaining in the stage and an 18-minute lead over the peloton, Machado was dropped by Gougeard, while Berhane was also dropped by the group behind. Monfort caught Machado; they were then joined by Amaël Moinard (BMC) and Andrey Amador (Movistar) to form a four-man group chasing Gougeard. Although they were at times within sight of Gougeard, he was able to stay away and took a solo stage win. On the cobbled section, Nelson Oliveira (Lampre–Mérida) caught and passed the chasing group to take second place on the stage, 40" behind Gougeard, with Monfort taking third.

In the main field, which ultimately finished over 16 minutes behind Gougeard, Valverde attacked on the Alto de la Paramera but was chased by Tinkoff–Saxo. He attacked twice more, eventually being joined by Diego Rosa (Astana) and gaining a few seconds' lead. He dropped Rosa, but the group caught him on the cobbled climb. Dumoulin was supported well by his team: although the lead group had been reduced to 20 riders, he was still accompanied by Lawson Craddock and John Degenkolb. With the assistance of his teammates, Dumoulin attacked on the climb and was joined by Daniel Moreno (Katusha); although Aru chased hard, he lost a further three seconds to Dumoulin, who therefore increased his general classification lead to six seconds. Giant-Alpecin's directeur sportif, Christian Guiberteau, described Degenkolb's riding in support of Dumoulin as "phenomenal".

Result of stage 19
Rank	Rider	Team	Time
1	Alexis Gougeard (FRA)	AG2R La Mondiale	4h 19' 20"
2	Nelson Oliveira (POR)	Lampre–Merida	+ 40"
3	Maxime Monfort (BEL)	Lotto–Soudal	+ 44"
4	Andrey Amador (CRC)	Movistar Team	+ 44"
5	Tiago Machado (POR)	Team Katusha	+ 44"
6	Amaël Moinard (FRA)	BMC Racing Team	+ 44"
7	Fabio Duarte (COL)	Colombia	+ 53"
8	David Arroyo (ESP)	Caja Rural–Seguros RGA	+ 1' 03"
9	Christian Knees (GER)	Team Sky	+ 1' 17"
10	Francisco Ventoso (ESP)	Movistar Team	+ 1' 17"
Source: ProCyclingStats

General classification after stage 19
Rank	Rider	Team	Time
1	Tom Dumoulin (NED)	Team Giant–Alpecin	78hr 21' 50"
2	Fabio Aru (ITA)	Astana	+ 6"
3	Joaquim Rodríguez (ESP)	Team Katusha	+ 1' 24"
4	Rafał Majka (POL)	Tinkoff–Saxo	+ 2' 31"
5	Nairo Quintana (COL)	Movistar Team	+ 3' 02"
6	Alejandro Valverde (ESP)	Movistar Team	+ 3' 24"
7	Esteban Chaves (COL)	Orica–GreenEDGE	+ 3' 39"
8	Daniel Moreno (ESP)	Team Katusha	+ 3' 46"
9	Mikel Nieve (ESP)	Team Sky	+ 4' 19"
10	Louis Meintjes (RSA)	MTN–Qhubeka	+ 7' 00"
Source: ProCyclingStats

== Stage 20 ==
12 September 2015 — San Lorenzo de El Escorial to Cercedilla, 175.8 km (109 mi)

Profile of stage 20

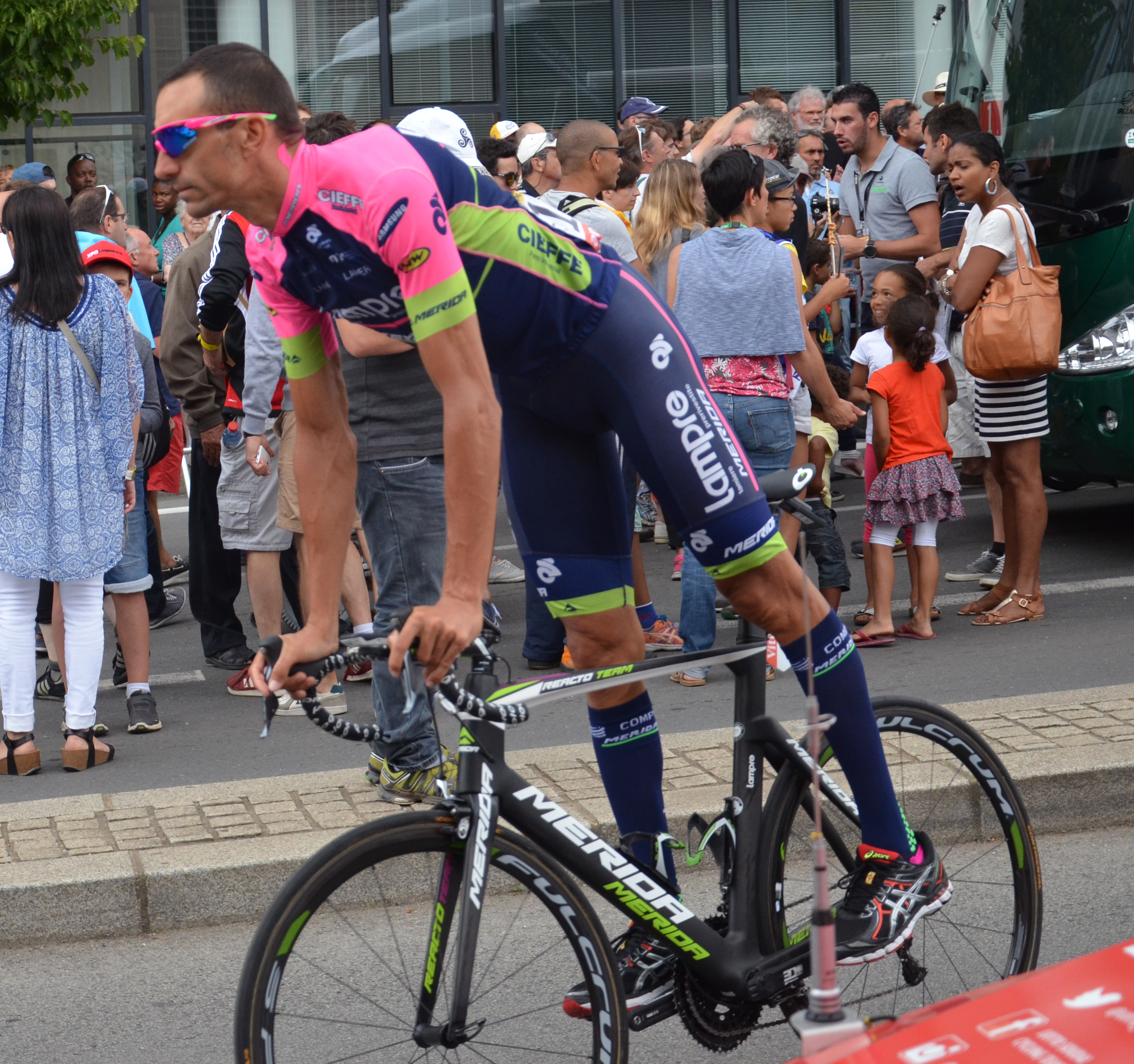
Rubén Plaza (Lampre–Merida) won stage 20 with a 117-kilometre solo breakaway (photographed at the 2015 Tour de France).

Stage 20 was the final mountainous stage of the Vuelta and included four first-category climbs in 175.8 kilometres (109.2 mi) of racing. The stage began in San Lorenzo de El Escorial, leaving the town to the north and reaching Cercedilla after 17 kilometres (11 mi). The route did not pass the finish line but continued north and started the first climb of the day, the Puerto de Navacerrada (9.4 kilometres (5.8 mi) at 6.6%). After a short plateau and a steep descent, the riders started climbing again with the northern face of the Puerto de la Morcuera (11.5 kilometres (7.1 mi) at 5.4%). After another steep descent, there were around 40 kilometres (25 mi) of flat roads, which took the riders around in a loop. They then returned to Cercedilla using the same roads in the opposite direction. This meant that they first climbed the southern face of the Puerto de la Morcuera (10.4 kilometres (6.5 mi) at 6.6%). Following the descent, they reached the final climb of the day, the Puerto de Cotos (11 kilometres (6.8 mi) at 5.3%). This brought them back to the plateau with 17.8 kilometres (11.1 mi) to the finish line. They then descended from the plateau back into Cercedilla to the finish line. The stage was Fabio Aru's last chance to take back time on Tom Dumoulin; before the stage Alasdair Fotheringham wrote on Cyclingnews.com that the race was still "too close to call".

The stage again began with a contest to get into the day's breakaway. Eventually a group of ten riders formed. These were Rubén Plaza (Lampre–Mérida), Adam Hansen (Lotto–Soudal), Jaco Venter (MTN-Qhubeka), Larry Warbasse (IAM Cycling), Daniel Navarro (Cofidis), Jay McCarthy (Tinkoff–Saxo), José Gonçalves (Caja Rural-Seguros), Eduard Vorganov (Katusha), Moreno Moser (Cannondale–Garmin), Miguel Ángel Rubiano (Colombia) and Yukiya Arashiro (Europcar). 29 more riders escaped from the peloton and chased the leaders. At the top of the first climb, the lead group had a minute's lead, with a further five minutes to the peloton. On the second climb, Plaza attacked alone and built a lead of over two minutes. The two groups behind came together to form a 38-rider chase group. Plaza by this point was 13 minutes ahead of the peloton. His lead to the chasing group fell on the way to the third climb of the day, but then rose again on the climb to reach three minutes. Plaza's lead was nearly two minutes at the top of the final climb and he held on to take the stage victory. Gonçalves and Alessandro De Marchi (Lotto–Soudal) broke away from the rest of the group and took second and third places respectively, over a minute behind Plaza. Plaza's solo effort started 117 kilometres (73 mi) from the finish line and lasted for more than three hours.

Astana moved to the head of the main peloton after the second climb of the day. Although Dumoulin was still in the group, he had lost most of his teammates. Astana then attacked with 4 kilometres (2.5 mi) remaining on the third climb: Mikel Landa attacked first; Aru followed him and was joined by Quintana and Rafał Majka. Dumoulin was dropped but was then able to ride back to the group. By this point the group contained just eight riders: Landa, Aru, Quintana, Majka, Dumoulin, Rodríguez, Chaves and Mikel Nieve (Sky). Towards the summit, Dumoulin and Nieve were dropped. Dumoulin attempted to ride back to the group on the descent and flat; Aru, however, had three teammates in the group (Luis León Sánchez and Andrey Zeits had dropped back from the early breakaway) and they were able to defend their lead. On the final climb, Quintana and Majka attacked and gained over a minute's lead ahead of the rest of the group; they were assisted by Andrey Amador, Quintana's teammate, who had also been in the breakaway. Rodríguez rode hard at the front of the group to defend his overall position. Quintana and Majka finished around 50" ahead of Rodríguez, Aru and Chaves. Dumoulin finished nearly four minutes further back. Aru therefore moved into the race lead, with Rodríguez in second and Majka third. Dumoulin dropped to sixth place.

Aru said after the stage that he had been able to tell that Dumoulin was tired. He paid particular credit to his teammates who had encouraged him to attack from a long way out. Dumoulin said that he had been "just empty" before he was dropped on the Morcuera. Plaza's stage victory was described as "extraordinary" and "epic" by Cycling Weekly; he said after the climb that he knew the climbs well and had intended to ride all the way to the finish when he made his initial attack. The stage victory was his second in the Vuelta (following a time-trial win in 2005) and also his second Grand Tour stage of the season, after he also won a stage of the 2015 Tour de France.

Result of stage 20
Rank	Rider	Team	Time
1	Rubén Plaza (ESP)	Lampre–Merida	4h 37' 05"
2	José Gonçalves (POR)	Caja Rural–Seguros RGA	+ 1' 07"
3	Alessandro De Marchi (ITA)	BMC Racing Team	+ 1' 08"
4	Romain Sicard (FRA)	Team Europcar	+ 1' 29"
5	Amaël Moinard (FRA)	BMC Racing Team	+ 1' 30"
6	Carlos Verona (ESP)	Etixx–Quick-Step	+ 1' 30"
7	Sergio Henao (COL)	Team Sky	+ 1' 30"
8	Kenny Elissonde (FRA)	FDJ	+ 1' 35"
9	Matteo Montaguti (ITA)	AG2R La Mondiale	+ 1' 43"
10	Moreno Moser (ITA)	Cannondale–Garmin	+ 2' 40"
Source: ProCyclingStats

General classification after stage 20
Rank	Rider	Team	Time
1	Fabio Aru (ITA)	Astana	83hr 01' 40"
2	Joaquim Rodríguez (ESP)	Team Katusha	+ 1' 17"
3	Rafał Majka (POL)	Tinkoff–Saxo	+ 1' 29"
4	Nairo Quintana (COL)	Movistar Team	+ 2' 02"
5	Esteban Chaves (COL)	Orica–GreenEDGE	+ 3' 30"
6	Tom Dumoulin (NED)	Team Giant–Alpecin	+ 3' 46"
7	Alejandro Valverde (ESP)	Movistar Team	+ 7' 10"
8	Mikel Nieve (ESP)	Team Sky	+ 7' 26"
9	Daniel Moreno (ESP)	Team Katusha	+ 7' 32"
10	Louis Meintjes (RSA)	MTN–Qhubeka	+ 10' 46"
Source: ProCyclingStats

== Stage 21 ==
13 September 2015 — Alcalá de Henares to Madrid, 98.8 km (61 mi)

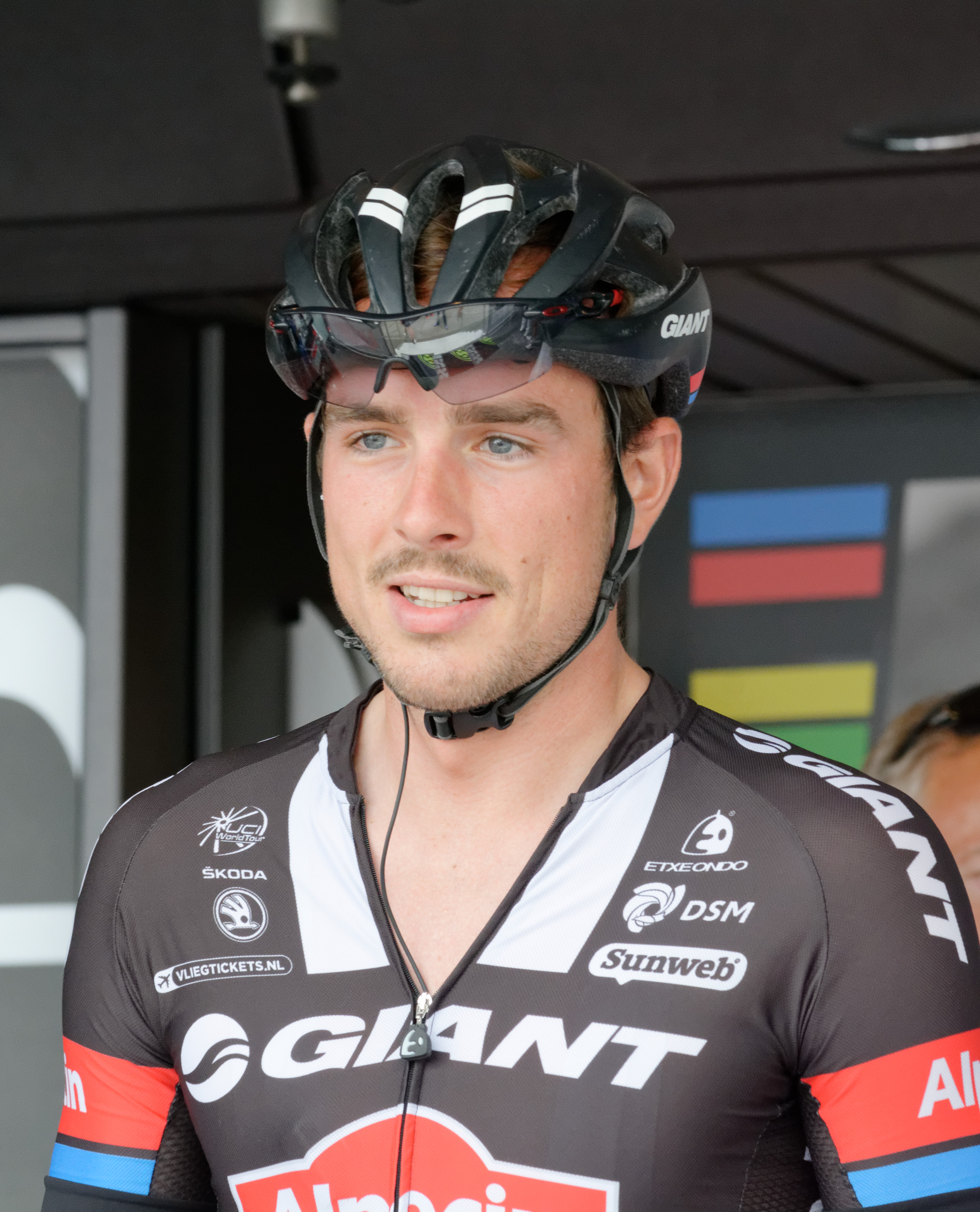
John Degenkolb (Team Giant–Alpecin) won the sprint finish on the final stage of the Vuelta (photographed at the 2015 Tour de Suisse).

The final stage of the 2015 Vuelta was short and flat. It began with a 40-kilometre (25 mi) section of flat roads that took the riders from Alcalá de Henares to a finishing circuit in the centre of Madrid. The finishing circuit itself was 5.8 kilometres (3.6 mi) in length, including four sharp corners. The final corner, a hairpin turn, came with a little over 1 kilometre (0.62 mi) to the finish line. The riders rode ten complete laps of the circuit; the stage was 98.8 kilometres (61 mi) in total. The stage was almost entirely flat. The stage took place in the evening and was intended to be a festive conclusion to the Vuelta.

The first part of the stage was not ridden competitively. At the end of the first complete lap was the day's intermediate sprint. Joaquim Rodríguez had suffered a puncture immediately before the sprint and Alejandro Valverde, who had been two points behind him in the points classification, took the four points available at the lead of the competition. Rodríguez said after the stage that he was angry that Valverde had taken the green jersey from him when the final stage was meant to be a party; the two riders were known not to get on, following an incident at the 2013 world championships road race. After the sprint, six riders formed a breakaway. These were Ben King (Cannondale–Garmin), Matteo Montaguti (Ag2r–La Mondiale), Omar Fraile (Caja Rural-Seguros RGA), Laurent Pichon (FDJ), Carlos Verona (Etixx–Quick-Step) and Giovanni Visconti (Movistar). Their lead never exceeded 30" and they were caught on the penultimate lap. Despite further attacks, the peloton stayed together and the stage ended in a bunch sprint.

Giant-Alpecin's lead-out train included Tom Dumoulin and they took over at the front of the peloton with 1,500 metres (4,900 ft) to the finish line. The team gave John Degenkolb a perfect lead-out; although Degenkolb started sprinting early, he was able to take the victory by a large margin over Danny van Poppel to take his first stage victory of the 2015 Vuelta. Jempy Drucker (BMC) finished third. Aru was behind a split in the peloton and lost 20" to Rodríguez; nevertheless, he took the overall victory in the Vuelta by 57". Degenkolb said after the stage that the victory meant a lot following Dumoulin's loss of the overall lead on the previous stage and that the team would leave Spain with "positive feelings".

Result of stage 21
Rank	Rider	Team	Time
1	John Degenkolb (GER)	Team Giant–Alpecin	2h 34' 13"
2	Danny van Poppel (NED)	Trek Factory Racing	+ 0"
3	Jempy Drucker (LUX)	BMC Racing Team	+ 0"
4	Daryl Impey (RSA)	Orica–GreenEDGE	+ 0"
5	Tosh Van der Sande (BEL)	Lotto–Soudal	+ 0"
6	Maximiliano Richeze (ARG)	Lampre–Merida	+ 0"
7	Nikolas Maes (BEL)	Etixx–Quick-Step	+ 0"
8	Kristian Sbaragli (ITA)	MTN–Qhubeka	+ 0"
9	Kévin Reza (FRA)	FDJ	+ 0"
10	Tom Van Asbroeck (BEL)	LottoNL–Jumbo	+ 0"
Source: ProCyclingStats

Final general classification
Rank	Rider	Team	Time
1	Fabio Aru (ITA)	Astana	85hr 36' 13"
2	Joaquim Rodríguez (ESP)	Team Katusha	+ 57"
3	Rafał Majka (POL)	Tinkoff–Saxo	+ 1' 19"
4	Nairo Quintana (COL)	Movistar Team	+ 1' 42"
5	Esteban Chaves (COL)	Orica–GreenEDGE	+ 3' 10"
6	Tom Dumoulin (NED)	Team Giant–Alpecin	+ 3' 46"
7	Alejandro Valverde (ESP)	Movistar Team	+ 6' 47"
8	Mikel Nieve (ESP)	Team Sky	+ 7' 06"
9	Daniel Moreno (ESP)	Team Katusha	+ 7' 12"
10	Louis Meintjes (RSA)	MTN–Qhubeka	+ 10' 26"
Source: ProCyclingStats
