= Danny van Poppel =

Dutch cyclist (born 1993)

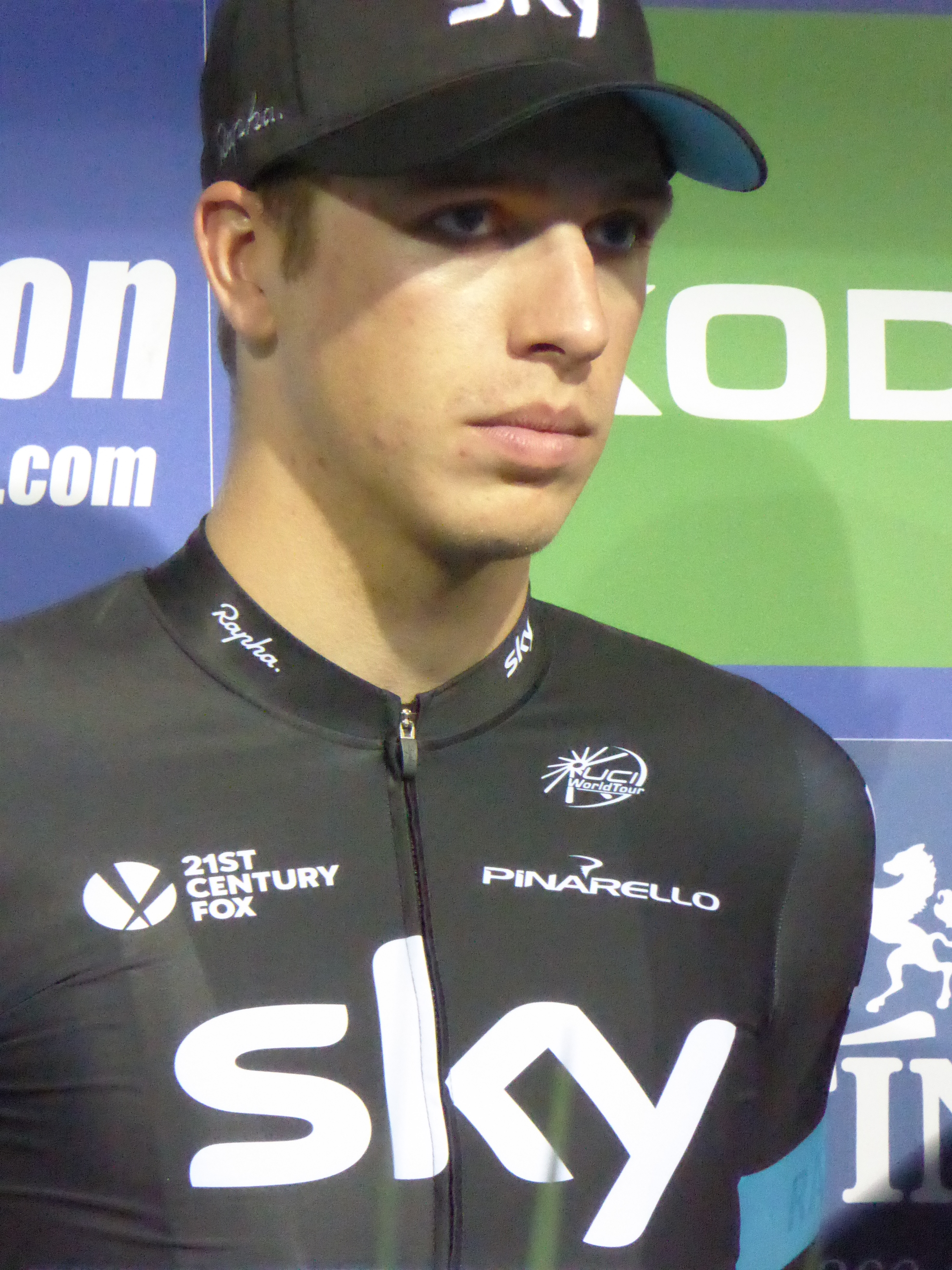
- Van Poppel at the 2016 Tour of Britain

Personal information
- Full name: Danny van Poppel
- Born: 26 July 1993 (age 33) Utrecht, Netherlands
- Height: 1.84 m (6 ft 0 in)
- Weight: 78 kg (172 lb)

Cycling career
- Sport: Cycling
- Current team: Red Bull–Bora–Hansgrohe
- Discipline: Road
- Role: Rider
- Rider type: Sprinter; Leadout man

Professional teams
- 2012: Rabobank Continental Team
- 2013: Vacansoleil–DCM
- 2014–2015: Trek Factory Racing
- 2016–2017: Team Sky
- 2018–2019: LottoNL–Jumbo
- 2020–2021: Circus–Wanty Gobert
- 2022–: Bora–Hansgrohe

Major wins
- Grand Tours Vuelta a España 1 individual stage (2015) One-day races and Classics National Road Race Championships (2025)

Danny van Poppel (born 26 July 1993) is a Dutch professional road racing cyclist, who rides for UCI WorldTeam Red Bull–Bora–Hansgrohe.

== Early and personal life ==
Danny van Poppel is the son of former professional cyclists Jean-Paul van Poppel and Leontine van der Lienden; his older brother Boy van Poppel and cousin Bram Welten are also professional cyclists.

== Career ==
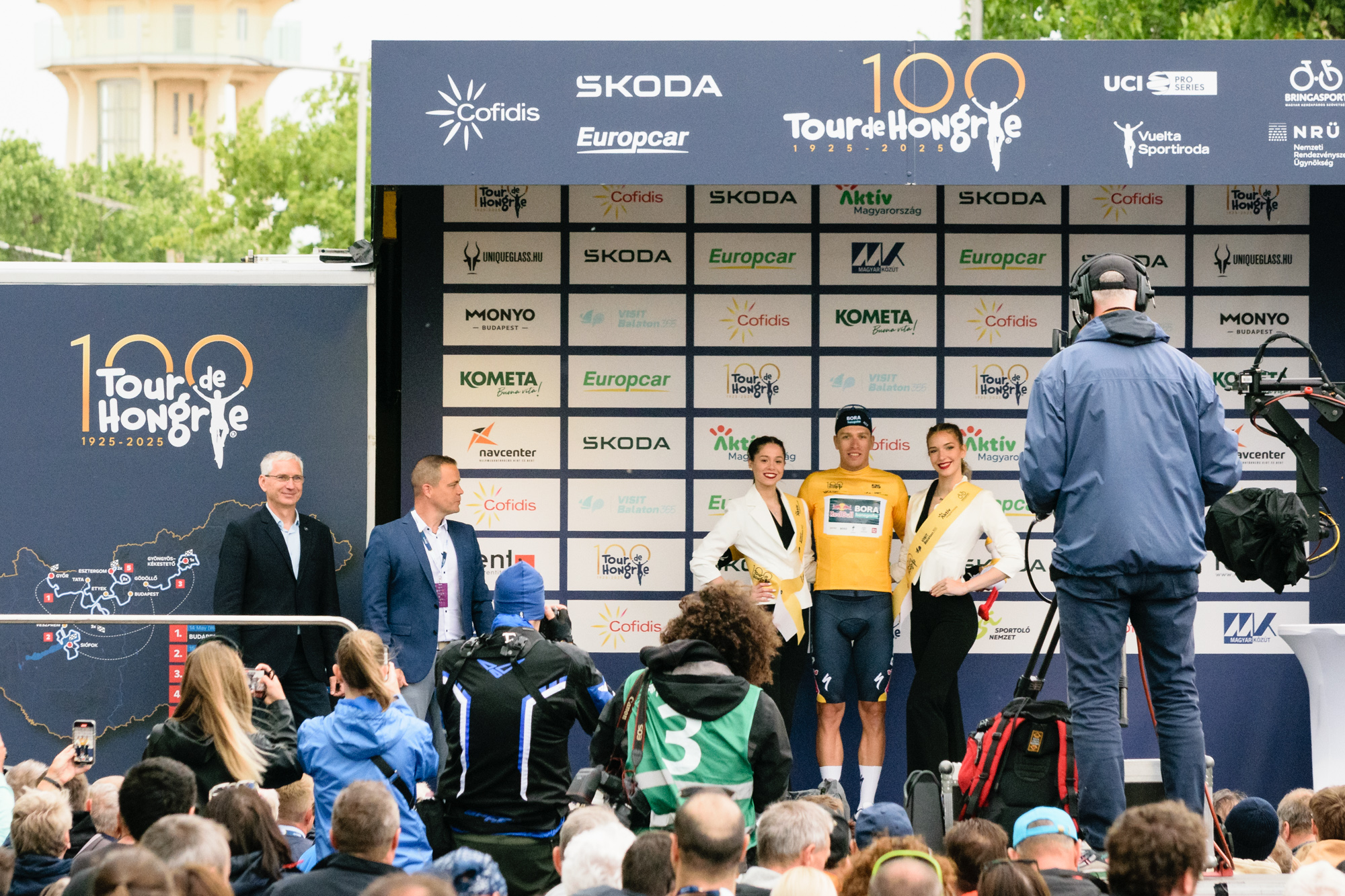
Poppel receiving the yellow jersey at the podium ceremony after Stage 2 of the 2025 Tour de Hongrie

Van Poppel started in the 2013 Tour de France at the age of 19, and thus became the youngest cyclist to ride the Tour de France since World War II. On the opening stage, he finished in third place and wore the white jersey (representing the young rider classification) the following day, as the classification's leader Marcel Kittel was wearing the yellow jersey of overall race leader. He remained in the race until the final week, when his team withdrew him on the second rest day.

Van Poppel joined Trek Factory Racing for the 2014 season, after his previous team – Vacansoleil–DCM – folded at the end of the 2013 season. He was named in the start list for the 2015 Vuelta a España, where he took the biggest win of his career to date on stage 12. Subsequently, it was announced that van Poppel would join Team Sky for the 2016 season.

In May 2018, he was named in the startlist for the 2018 Giro d'Italia.

== Major results ==
=== Cyclo-cross ===
2009–2010
UCI Junior World Cup

2nd Hoogerheide

Junior Superprestige

2nd Diegem

2nd Junior Sint-Michielsgestel
Junior Gazet van Antwerpen

3rd Loenhout

2010–2011
1st National Junior Championships
Junior Gazet van Antwerpen

1st Loenhout
1st Koppenberg

Junior Superprestige

1st Diegem
2nd Gavere

UCI Junior World Cup

2nd Pontchâteau

=== Road ===
2010
1st Overall Driedaagse van Axel

1st Stage 4

2nd GP Bati-Metallo
4th Overall Liège–La Gleize

1st Stage 2 (TTT)

10th Overall Course de la Paix Juniors

1st Stage 1

2011
2nd Overall Driedaagse van Axel

1st Stage 5

3rd Time trial, National Junior Championships
8th Overall Course de la Paix Juniors

1st Stage 6

2012
Thüringen Rundfahrt der U23

1st Stages 1 (TTT), 2 & 5

1st Stage 1 Vuelta Ciclista a León
2nd Overall Istrian Spring Trophy
5th Grand Prix de la ville de Nogent-sur-Oise
6th Arno Wallaard Memorial
10th Overall Olympia's Tour
2013
3rd Handzame Classic
5th Ronde van Drenthe
5th RideLondon–Surrey Classic
7th Brussels Cycling Classic
8th Overall Tour de Picardie
2014 (2 pro wins)
1st Prologue Tour de Luxembourg
3rd Scheldeprijs
3rd Grote Prijs Jef Scherens
4th Grand Prix of Aargau Canton
5th Kampioenschap van Vlaanderen
7th Overall Driedaagse van West-Vlaanderen

1st Stage 1

2015 (4)
1st Stage 12 Vuelta a España
2nd Grand Prix Pino Cerami
3rd Road race, National Championships
4th Overall Tour de Wallonie

1st Points classification
1st Stages 2 & 5

4th Grand Prix Impanis-Van Petegem
5th Trofeo Santanyi–Ses Salines–Campos
5th Scheldeprijs
6th Overall Driedaagse van West-Vlaanderen

1st Stage 2

6th Nokere Koerse
8th Kampioenschap van Vlaanderen
2016 (4)
Vuelta a Burgos

1st Points classification
1st Stages 1 & 3

1st Stage 2 Tour de Yorkshire
1st Stage 2 Arctic Race of Norway
1st Sprints classification, Three Days of De Panne
4th EuroEyes Cyclassics
6th Scheldeprijs
2017 (2)
1st Prologue Herald Sun Tour
1st Stage 5 Tour de Pologne
2018 (3)
1st Halle–Ingooigem
1st Binche–Chimay–Binche
1st Stage 1 Volta a la Comunitat Valenciana
2nd Road race, National Championships
2nd Clásica de Almería
3rd Famenne Ardenne Classic
7th Dwars door het Hageland
2019
5th Gent–Wevelgem
7th Dwars door Vlaanderen
7th Omloop van het Houtland
2020 (1)
1st Gooikse Pijl
3rd Paris–Chauny
4th Clásica de Almería
5th Milano–Torino
2021 (2)
1st Egmont Cycling Race
1st Binche–Chimay–Binche
1st Points classification, Benelux Tour
2nd Dwars door het Hageland
2nd Gooikse Pijl
2nd Omloop van het Houtland
3rd Grote Prijs Marcel Kint
4th Scheldeprijs
4th Eurométropole Tour
4th Antwerp Port Epic
5th Paris–Tours
6th Clásica de Almería
6th Elfstedenronde
7th Paris–Bourges
8th Brussels Cycling Classic
2022
2nd Scheldeprijs
2nd Rund um Köln
3rd Ronde van Limburg
4th Road race, UEC European Championships
5th Overall Saudi Tour
5th Eschborn–Frankfurt
2023 (2)
1st Rund um Köln
1st Stage 6 Tour of Britain
2nd Hamburg Cyclassics
3rd Overall Deutschland Tour
6th Münsterland Giro
6th Paris–Bourges
9th Gent–Wevelgem
2024
2nd Overall Deutschland Tour
3rd Classic Brugge–De Panne
6th Münsterland Giro
2025 (4)
1st Road race, National Championships
Tour de Hongrie

1st Points classification
1st Stages 1 & 2

Tour of Holland

1st Points classification
1st Stage 5

5th Hamburg Cyclassics
5th Scheldeprijs
8th Overall Deutschland Tour
2026
5th Copenhagen Sprint
8th Overall ZLM Tour

==== Grand Tour general classification results timeline ====
Grand Tour	2013	2014	2015	2016	2017	2018	2019	2020	2021	2022	2023	2024	2025
Giro d'Italia	—	—	—	—	—	121	—	—	—	—	—	DNF	—
Tour de France	DNF	DNF	—	—	—	—	—	—	120	108	116	120	
Vuelta a España	—	—	141	—	—	132	—	—	—	121	—	—	

Legend
—	Did not compete
DNF	Did not finish
