= Christian Guiberteau =

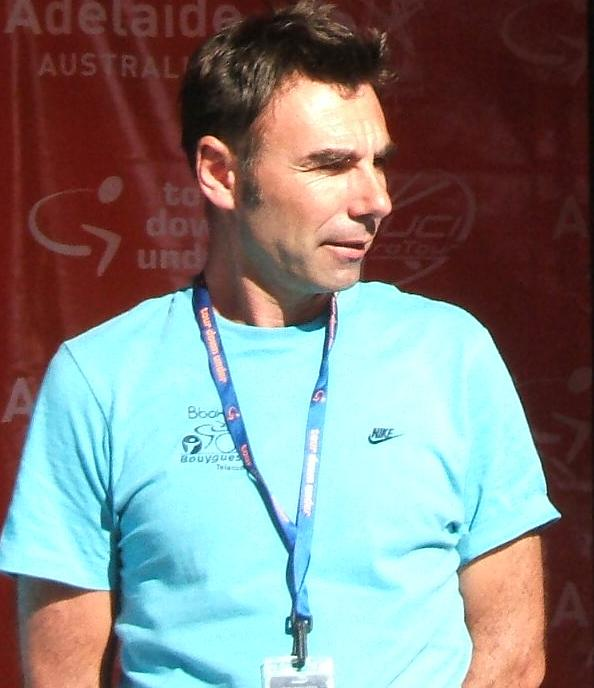

Personal information
- Full name: Christian Guiberteau
- Born: 6 January 1968 (age 58) Cholet, France

Cycling career
- Sport: Cycling
- Current team: Team TotalEnergies
- Discipline: Road
- Role: Directeur sportif

Managerial team
- 2000–: Bonjour

Christian Guiberteau (born 6 January 1968) is a directeur sportif with the Team TotalEnergies cycling team.
